= 6th Carabinieri Battalion "Toscana" =

- 6° Battaglione Carabinieri "Toscana"
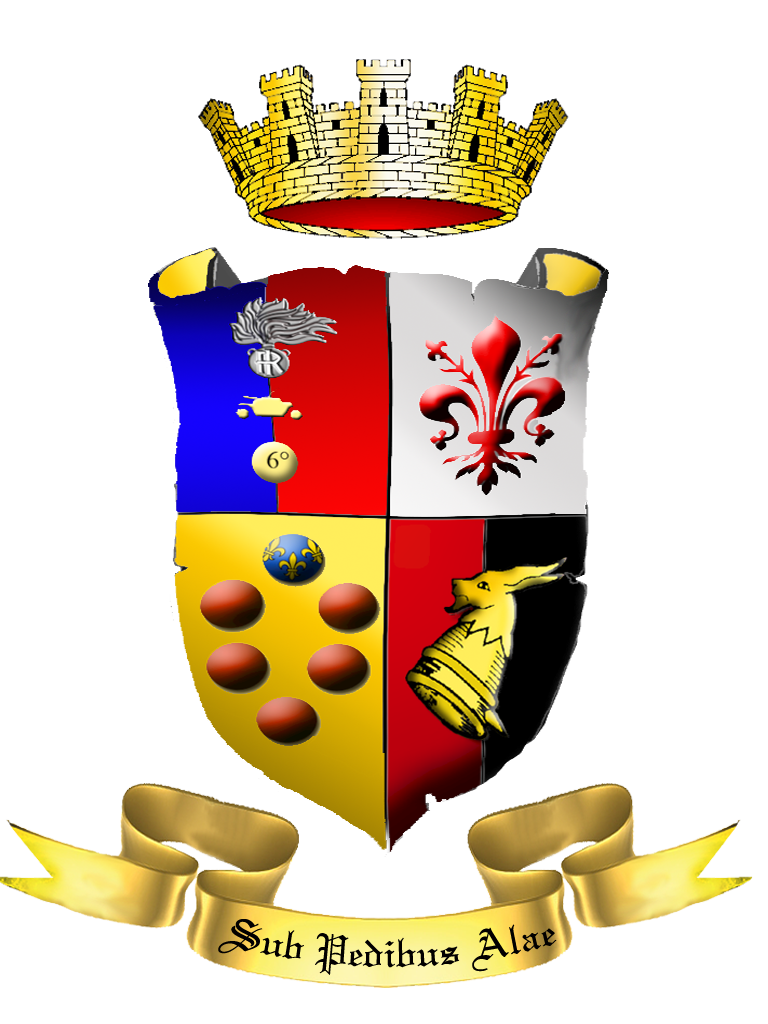
- Coat of Arms of the 6th Carabinieri Battalion "Toscana"
- Active: 1920 - 1923; 1945 - present
- Country: Italy
- Branch: Carabinieri
- Type: Gendarmerie
- Role: Riot control
- Size: Battalion
- Part of: 5th Carabinieri Regiment "Emilia Romagna"
- Garrison/HQ: "Antonio Baldissera" Barracks, Florence
- Motto: "Sub Pedibus Alae"

Commanders
- Current commander: Ten. Col. Domenico Pasquale Montemurro

The 6th Carabinieri Battalion "Toscana" (Italian: 6° Battaglione Carabinieri "Toscana") is a Battalion of the Carabinieri Mobile Units Division tasked with riot control and emergency services. The Battalion is garrisoned in Florence.

The Battalion is part of the 5th Carabinieri Regiment "Emilia-Romagna".

== History ==
The 6th Carabinieri Battalion "Toscana" tracks its origins back to the establishment of dedicated riot control units after World War I.

=== 1920 - 1923 ===
The Battalion was established on 2 May 1920 as the Mobile Carabinieri Battalion of Florence.

By force of the Royal Decree of 20 April 1920, no. 451, the Mobile Carabinieri Battalion of Florence was established among eighteen Autonomous Mobile Battalions.^{pp. 279–280}

The Mobile Carabinieri Battalion of Florence was organized on:

- 3 Carabinieri on foot companies;
- 1 Cyclist Carabinieri Company;
- 1 Machine-guns Section (2 Sections for seven Mobile Battalions: Torino 1°, Milano 1°, Firenze, Roma 1°, Roma 2°, Roma 3°, Palermo).^{p. 24}

The Florence Mobile Battalion was disbanded by royal decree on 30 December 1923.

=== 1940 - 2001 ===
On 10 December 1940, following Italy's entry into the war, the VI mobilised Carabinieri Battalion was formed and operated on the Greek-Albanian front until 8 September 1943.

In 1940 the new Army organization foresaw four Carabinieri Battalions, while on 3 January 1944 12 Battalions (renamed Mobile Battalions) were re-established,^{p. 232} in order to deal with the civil unrest following the end of the civil war, along with four Mobile Battalions Groups.

The 1944-established Mobile Battalions were equipped, supplied and maintained by the relevant Carabinieri Legion. The Mobile Battalions Groups were: The Florence Mobile Battalion was grouped under the 2nd Group, headquartered in Florence, and subordinated to the 2nd Carabinieri Division "Podgora".

The Mobile Battalions were provided of new vehicles in order to enable them to deploy rapidly.

On 6 September 1945 the Battalion was reconstituted with its original name and on 30 March 1963 it was placed under the control of the 2nd Carabinieri Regiment of Rome.

On 1 September 1977, placed under the 11th Carabinieri Brigade, with corps command functions, it assumed its current name of 6th Carabinieri Battalion "Toscana". On 21 December 1977, the Battalion received the War Flag, granted by presidential decree 7 October 1977 n. 861.

On 2 May 2000 the Battalion celebrated the 80th anniversary of its establishment on the occasion of which a commemorative postcard and a commemorative philatelic postmark were created.

=== 2001 - present ===
On 1 October 2007 the Battalion, following the assignment of an officer of the administration specialty, was reconfigured from a minor detachment to an ordinary detachment, consequently acquiring full administrative-financial autonomy.

In September 2012 the Battalion was transferred under the control of the newly established 5th Carabinieri Regiment "Emilia-Romagna".

=== List of commanders ===
Rank	Name	Period
Magg.	Alfredo Grimaldi	1945 - 1945
Ten. Col.	Lelio Palandri	1945 - 1954
Magg.	Domenico Maneri	1954 - 1957
Magg.	Mario Serchi	1957 - 1961
Magg.	Agatino Gelsomino	1961 - 1964
Ten. Col.	Sergio Valdora	1964 - 1968
Magg.	Mario Maio	1968 - 1970
Ten. Col.	Flavio Sermarini	1970 - 1973
Ten. Col. t.sg	Ignazio Assumma	1973 - 1978
Ten. Col.	Mario Scialdone	1978 - 1981
Ten. Col.	Bruno Tibaldi	1981 - 1983
Ten. Col.	Giuseppe Soldano	1983 - 1986
Ten. Col.	Mario Guglielmi	1986 - 1989
Ten. Col.	Mauro Picchiotti	1989 - 1992
Ten. Col.	Nicola Raggetti	1992 - 1994
Ten. Col.	Gaetano Guastafierro	1994 - 1997
Ten. Col.	Rosario Calì	1997 - 1998
Ten. Col.	Alessandro Gentili	1998 - 2000
Ten. Col.	Mariano Angioni	2000 - 2002
Ten. Col.	Mauro Isidori	2002 - 2004
Magg.	Matteo Gagliardi	2004 -2004
Ten. Col.	Fabrizio Volpe	2004 - 2005
Ten. Col.	Roberto Musillo	2005 - 2007
Ten. Col.	Carlo Gerosa	2007 - 2010
Ten. Col.	Giuseppe Petrella	2010 - 2012
Ten. Col.	Ruben Ruggeri	2012 - 2012
Ten. Col.	Ciro Trentin	2012 - 2016
Ten. Col.	Alessandro Parisi	2016 - 2019
Ten. Col. t.issmi	Gabriele De Pascalis	2019 - 2021
Magg.	Michele De Chiara	2021 - 2021
Ten. Col.	Nicola Erardo Maria Melidonis	2021 - 2021
Ten. Col.	Marco Centola	2021 - 20 September 2023
Ten. Col.	Domenico Pasquale Montemurro	20 September 2023 - incumbent

== Mission ==
The 6th Carabinieri Battalion "Toscana" is mandated to carry out:

- the contribution to an integrated defense of the national territory;
- the participation in public order services during large demonstrations and events such as sporting events and concerts;
- surveillance of sensitive military sites and those of a civil nature determined, from time to time, by the public security authority;
- the preparation of assets to be used in expeditionary missions to carry out military police functions and support some logistical activities;
- the support of the territorial organization of the Carabinieri Legion "Toscana" (territorial organisation) to increase territorial control in large urban, extra-urban and rural areas in the most sensitive areas in terms of public safety as well as civil protection needs.

== Organisational structure ==
The 6th Carabinieri Battalion "Toscana" is part of the 5th Carabinieri Regiment "Emilia-Romagna". In turn, the 5th Carabinieri Regiment operates under the 1st Carabinieri Mobile Brigade, which coordinates the use of mobile regiments.

The organizational structure of the 6th Battalion is as follows:

- Command and Services Squad
- Administration Section
- 1st Operational Company
- Operational Intervention Company: support to territorial organisation
- Rescue Unit

=== Operational Intervention Company ===
The Operational Intervention Company is the unit of the Battalion that has the task of promptly dealing with sudden situations of danger to public security. The Operational Intervention Company deploys both Operational Intervention Squads (Squadre di Intervento Operativo, S.I.O.) and Operational Support Squads (Squadre Operative di Supporto, S.O.S.).

The Operational Intervention Squads are tasked to perform extraordinary control measures (such as round-ups, manhunt, etc.) in support to territorial units of the Carabinieri.

The Operational Support Squads are also part of the Operational Intervention Company, with special tasks to prevent and promptly counter terrorist or other armed threats.

=== Rescue Unit ===
In order to deal with emergencies in the event of public disasters, a special rescue unit is set up when necessary at the 6th Battalion, previously trained and equipped with means and materials that ensure the carrying out of civil protection and safety activities in disaster areas.

== See also ==
- Antonio Baldissera
- Riot control
