= 4th Carabinieri Battalion "Veneto" =

- 4° Battaglione Carabinieri "Veneto"
- Country: Italy
- Branch: Carabinieri
- Type: Gendarmerie
- Role: Riot control
- Size: Battalion
- Part of: 1st Carabinieri Mobile Brigade
- Garrison/HQ: Mestre

Commanders
- Current commander: Col. Giovanni Mario Occhioni

The 4th Carabinieri Battalion "Veneto" (Italian: 4° Battaglione Carabinieri "Veneto") is a Carabinieri formation tasked with riot control, civil defence and security duties.

The current commander has been Colonel Giovanni Mario Occhioni since 11 September 2017.

== History ==
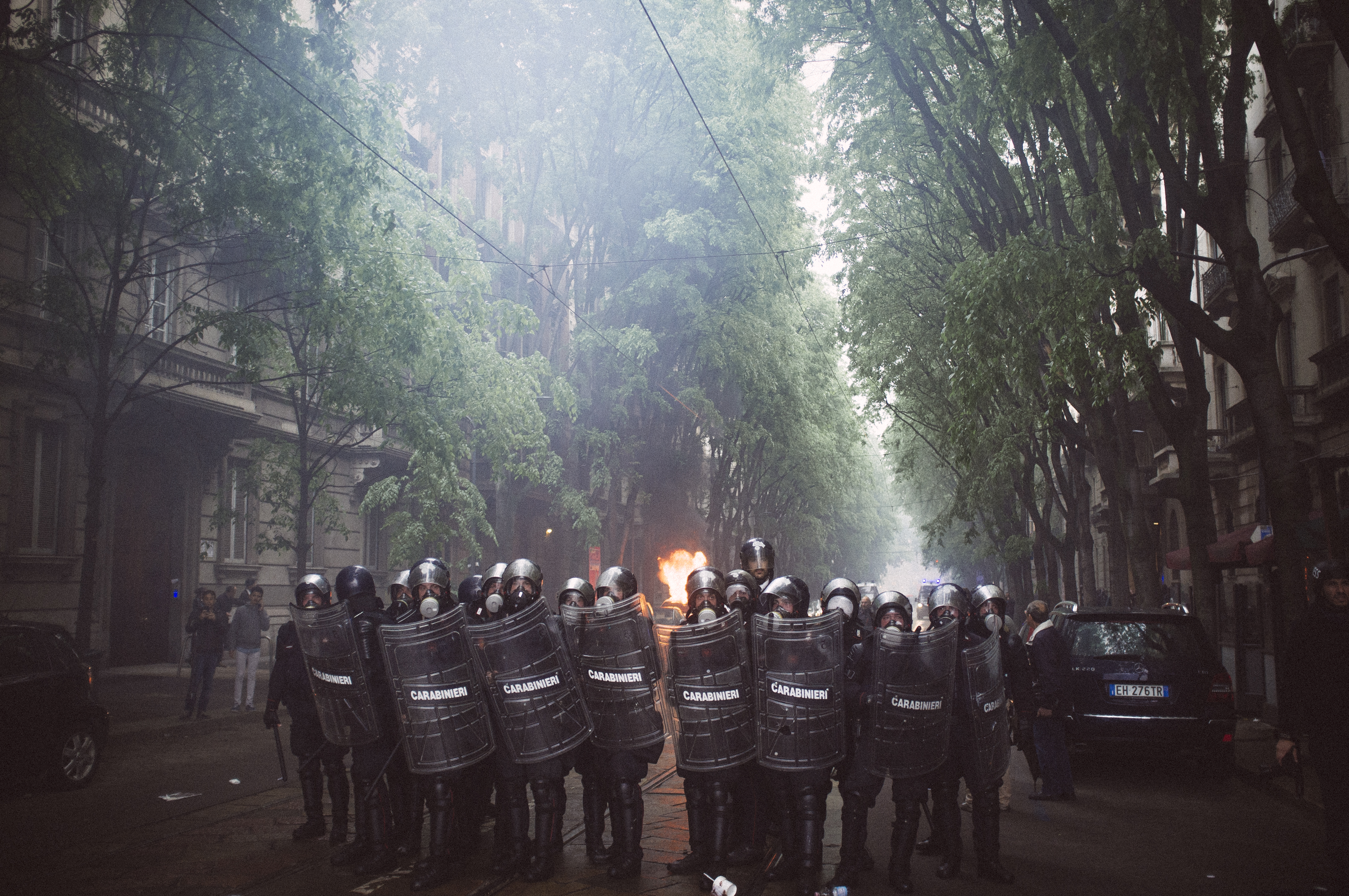
Carabinieri during riot control in 2015

Carabinieri Battalions, as a whole, can track their origins to 1920, when Carabinieri Mobile Battalions were formed. The first formation grouping all Carabinieri units tasked with mobile, riot control and combat duties was established as the 11th Carabinieri Mechanized Brigade, in 1963.

=== 1963–2001: 11th Carabinieri Brigade ===
In 1963, with the 1960s Army and Carabinieri reorganization, the XI Carabinieri Mechanized Brigade was established directly under the General Command, in order to cope with the internal territorial defence needs. The establishment of the new Brigade was in order to adjust the organization of the Battalions and of cavalry units both for strictly military tasks, and those related to the protection of public order. The aim was to ensure Carabinieri Battalions the availability of all elements necessary to be in a position to act in isolation and overcome considerable resistance without having to rely on the competition of other Army Corps or other Armed Forces, to ensure Battalions speed of movement and concentration in large sectors of foreseeable use and a constant high training level. The establishment of the XI Carabinieri Mechanized Brigade was decided also due to the wider Italian Army needs to have only one point of contact to deal with equipment, training and readiness of Carabinier Battalions, framed within military defence system.

In the reorganization, former Mobile Battalions were renamed simply Battalions and were marked with a sequential number, while remaining administratively dependent on the relevant territorial Legion; the Battalions Groups were renamed Carabinieri Regiments, and were given the conceptual role of a resolution unit in both riot and tactical tasks. The newly formed Mechanized Brigade exercised its operational and training authority on:

- 1st Carabinieri Regiment (HQ Milan): commanding I, II, III and IV Battalions;
- 2nd Carabinieri Regiment (HQ Rome): commanding V, VI, VIII and IX Battalions;
- 3rd Carabinieri Regiment (HQ Naples): commanding X, XI and XII Battalions;
- 4th Mounted Carabinieri Regiment (HQ Rome) with 2 Squadrons Groups (Battalion-level units) and 1 Armoured-motorized Squadron;
- VII Battalion (directly under the Brigade Command), under IV Army Corps; despite being the newest Battalion, the unit inherited traditions and number of the second battalion of Rome, which was disestablished.
- XIII Battalion (directly under the Brigade Command), under V Army Corps.

The command structure of the XI Carabinieri Mechanized Brigade consisted of:

- Staff, with personnel management and training bodies;
- Services Office, with activation and research tasks;
- Army officers of Transmissions and Motorization organizations, with management, technical, inspecting and consulting tasks.

The XI Carabinieri Mechanized Brigade did not exercise operational command tasks, but it did exercise training and readiness duties.

Each Carabinieri Battalion was led by a Lieutenant Colonel or a Major and consisted of: 1 Command Company (1 Command Platoon, 1 Services Platoon, 1 Scouts Platoon), 2 Rifle Companies (command platoon, 3 rifle platoons, 1 company weapons platoon each), 1 Mortars Company and 1 Tanks Company (Command Platoon, 3 Tanks Platoons). It was therefore a robust tactical complex. The Carabinieri Battalions had to be used only when the police and the local organization of the Carabinieri they had found insufficient, in order not to deprive the General Command of a valuable combat tool.

Overall, Carabinieri Battalions were divided into two groups, according to the main type (motorized or mechanized unit) of unit the unit deployed.

Between 1967 and 1968 it was set up the Inspectorate of Mechanized and Training Units (led by a Divisional general), with responsibility on the X Carabinieri Brigade (including schools) and XI Carabinieri Mechanized Brigade. In 1971 it was established the Inspectorate Schools and Special Carabinieri Units; it controlled the X Brigade (dedicated to training) and XI Brigade.

In 1969, Battalions framed within Carabinieri Regiments were reorganized. The new structure consisted of Battalion Command Unit, Command and Services Company (Command and Services Platoon, Scouts Platoon, Transmissions Platoon, Tanks Platoon, Transportations Platoon), 2 Mechanized Rifle Companies (Command and Services Platoon, 3 Rifle Platoons, Mortars Platoons). In 1970, a "Rescue Unit" is established within each Carabinieri Battalion.^{p. 204}

Between 1973 and 1976, the 5th Carabinieri Regiment (HQ Mestre) also existed, including IV, VII and XIII Battalions. In 1975 the XI Carabinieri Mechanized Brigade changed its name in 11th Carabinieri Mechanized Brigade (with Arabic numerals) and in 1976 the formation was renamed 11th Carabinieri Brigade; at the same time, the Brigade Command was tasked to exercise only training and logistical authority. On 1 September 1977, 1st, 2nd and 3rd Carabinieri Regiments were disestablished and their Battalions, including the Battalion based in Mestre, were transferred under the direct operational and training authority of the 11th Mechanized Brigade.

On 30 November 1977, the 4th Carabinieri Battalion "Veneto" was granted the War Flag.

With the end of the Cold War, the mobile organization lost its combat-oriented connotation, taking over the role of force mainly devoted to the performance of riot control. The 1st Carabinieri Group in Milan and the 2nd Carabinieri Group in Rome were established in the 1990s within the 11th Brigade; these units were renamed, in 1995, respectively Carabinieri Regiment in Milan and Carabinieri Regiment in Rome.

==== Operations ====
In the 1976 Friuli earthquake, the XIII Carabinieri Battalion "Friuli Venezia Giulia", IV Carabinieri Battalion "Veneto" and VII Carabinieri Battalion "Trentino Alto Adige" intervened paying rescue and providing police and utility services. In the 1980 Irpinia earthquake Carabinieri Battalions from Bari, Naples and Rome also intervened.^{pp. 203–204}

=== 2001–present day: 1st Carabinieri Mobile Brigade ===
With the transformation of the Arma dei Carabinieri in autonomous Armed Force, the 11th Carabinieri Brigade was split in two Brigades: the 1st Carabinieri Mobile Brigade controlled riot units, the 2nd Carabinieri Mobile Brigade was assigned combat-oriented Carabinieri Regiments. The two Carabinieri Mobile Brigades were grouped in the Carabinieri Mobile Units Division.

The 1st Carabinieri Mobile Brigade was initially headquartered in Rome; in 2001 it was transferred in Treviso; in 2013 it was moved back in Rome.

== See also ==
- 1st Carabinieri Mobile Brigade
