= 1st Carabinieri Regiment "Piemonte" =

- 1° Reggimento Carabinieri "Piemonte"
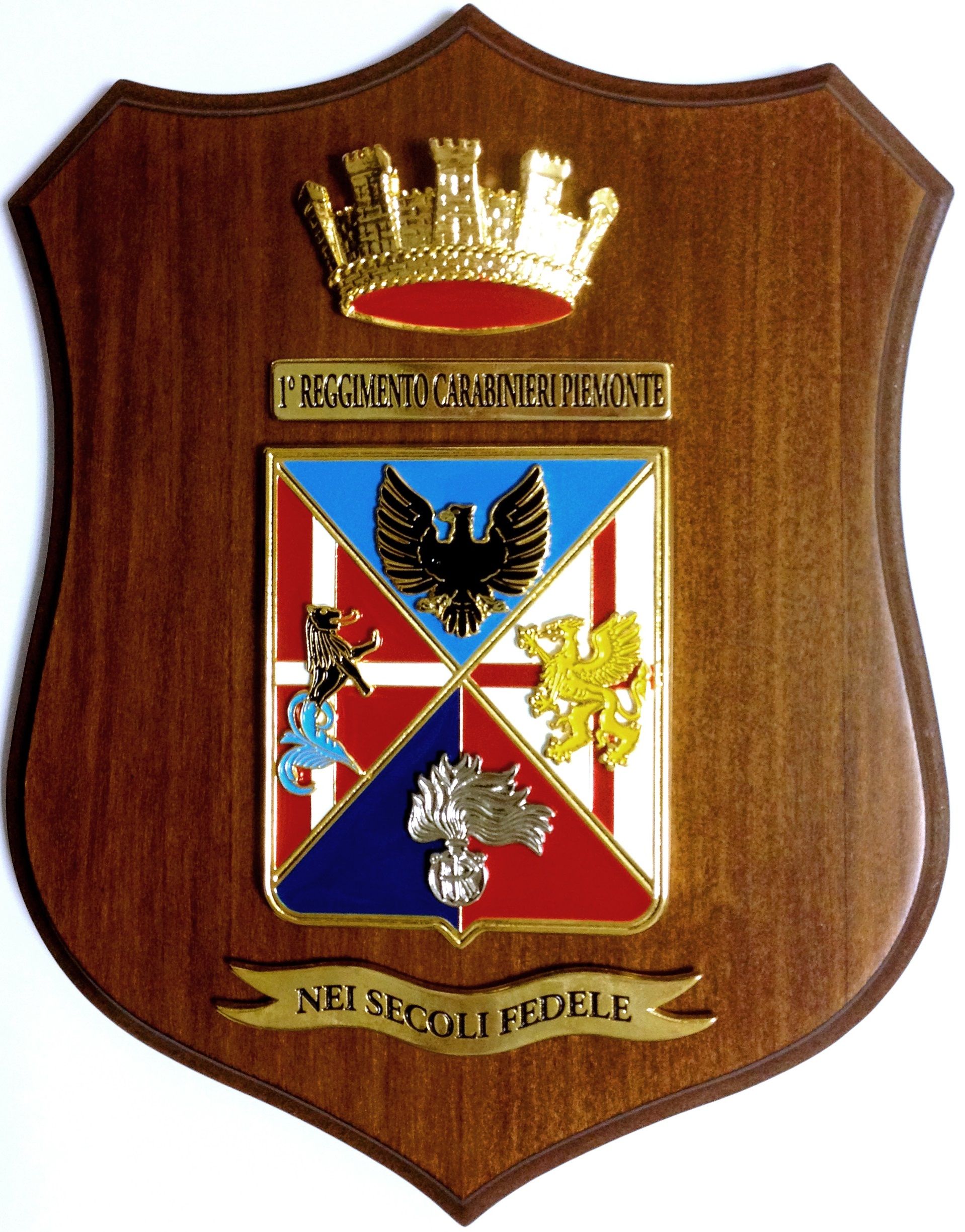
- Coat of arms
- Active: Battalion: 1915-1923; 1940-1943; 1945-2014 Regiment: 2014-present
- Country: Italy
- Branch: Carabinieri
- Type: Gendarmerie
- Role: Riot control, Civil protection
- Size: Regiment
- Part of: 1st Carabinieri Mobile Brigade
- Garrison/HQ: "Maggiore Alfredo Serranti MOVM" Barracks, Moncalieri Castle, Moncalieri

Commanders
- Current commander: Col. Cristiano Desideri

Insignia
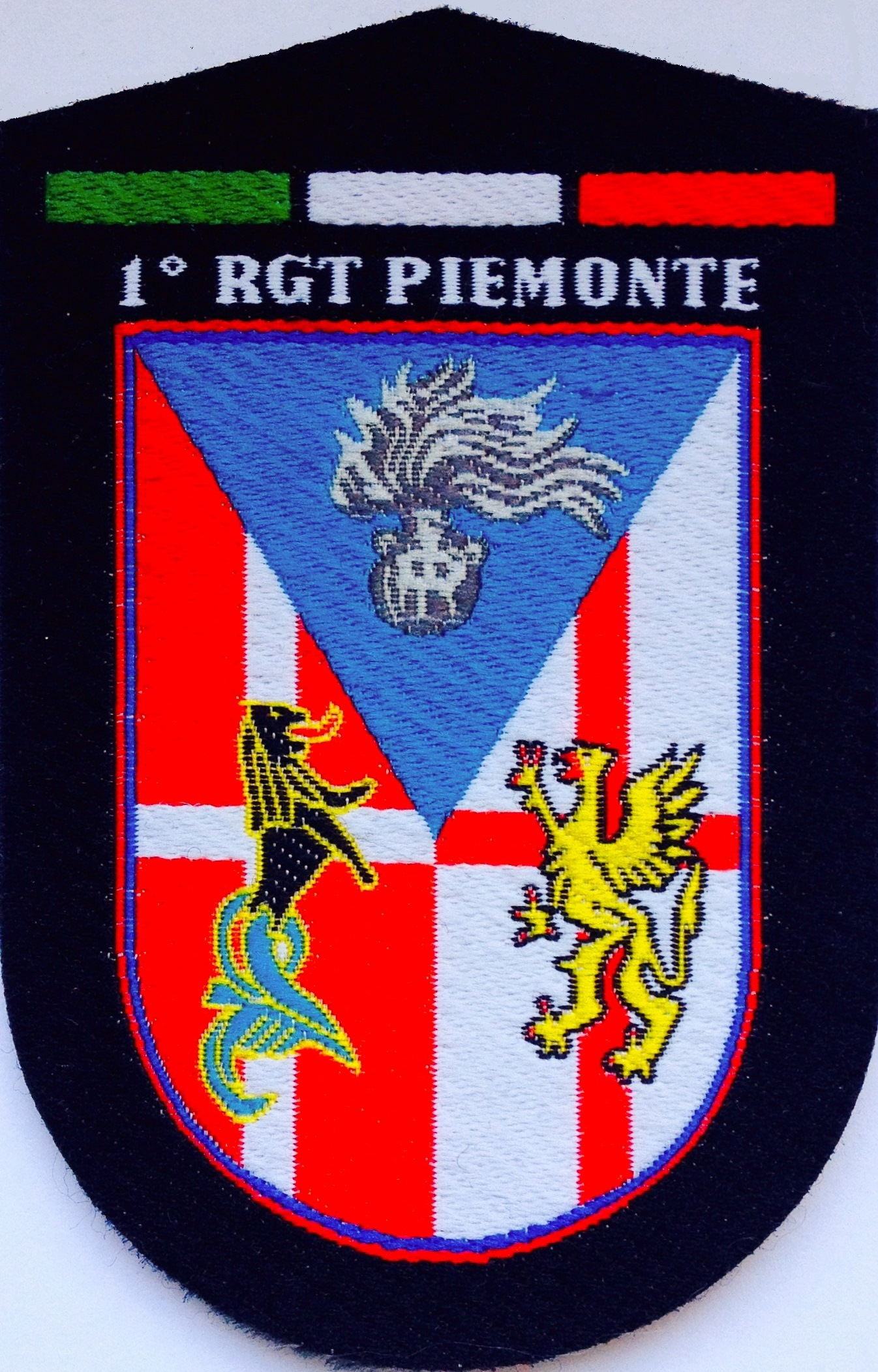
- Shoulder patch

The 1st Carabinieri Regiment "Piemonte" (Italian: 1° Reggimento Carabinieri "Piemonte") is a riot control unit of the Carabinieri.

== History ==
The 1st Carabinieri Regiment "Piemonte" could track its origins to 1920 when, by a decree of the Minister of War, 18 Carabinieri Mobile Battalions (each 743 or 764 Carabinieri-strong) were established;^{p. 116} two of these Battalions were based in Turin and named Carabinieri Mobile Battalion "Torino 1°" and Carabinieri Mobile Battalion "Torino 2°". Shortly after, the two Battalions were reduced to only one unit. Subsequently, the 1st Carabinieri Mobile Battalion was established in Turin, being disestablished on 30 December 1923.

In 1940, the unit was reestablished as "1st Mobilized Carabinieri Battalion", being deployed in Albania and Greece under the "Special Army Corps" led by General Giovanni Messe. Shortly after 8 September 1943 the Battalion was disestablished. In May 1945 the unit was reestablished as Carabinieri Mobile Battalion^{p. 167} under the Carabinieri Legion of Turin.^{p. 179} In 1948 the I Carabinieri Mobile Battalion was moved in Moncalieri Castle, where it has been garrisoned since.

=== 1963–2001: 11th Carabinieri Brigade ===
In 1963, with the 1960s Army and Carabinieri reorganization, the XI Carabinieri Mechanized Brigade was established directly under the General Command, in order to cope with the internal territorial defence needs. The establishment of the new Brigade was in order to adjust the organization of the Battalions and of cavalry units both for strictly military tasks, and those related to the protection of public order. The aim was to ensure Carabinieri Battalions the availability of all elements necessary to be in a position to act in isolation and overcome considerable resistance without having to rely on the competition of other Army Corps or other Armed Forces, to ensure Battalions speed of movement and concentration in large sectors of foreseeable use and a constant high training level.

In the reorganization, former Mobile Battalions were renamed simply Battalions and were marked with a sequential number, while remaining administratively dependent on the relevant territorial Legion; the Battalions Groups were renamed Carabinieri Regiments, and were given the conceptual role of a resolution unit in both riot and tactical tasks. The newly formed Mechanized Brigade exercised its operational and training authority on:

- 1st Carabinieri Regiment (HQ Milan): commanding I, II, III and IV Battalions;
- 2nd Carabinieri Regiment (HQ Rome): commanding V, VI, VIII and IX Battalions;
- 3rd Carabinieri Regiment (HQ Naples): commanding X, XI and XII Battalions;
- 4th Mounted Carabinieri Regiment (HQ Rome) with 2 Squadrons Groups (Battalion-level units) and 1 Armoured-motorized Squadron;
- VII Battalion (directly under the Brigade Command), under IV Army Corps; despite being the newest Battalion, the unit inherited traditions and number of the second battalion of Rome, which was disestablished.
- XIII Battalion (directly under the Brigade Command), under V Army Corps.

On 1 April 1963 the Battalion was therefore renamed "1st Carabinieri Battalion", was moved to Turin, placed at the dependencies of the then-1st Carabinieri Regiment (based in Milan).

In 1970, a "Rescue Unit" is established within each Carabinieri Battalion for civil protection and public rescue duties.^{p. 204} On 1 September 1977, 1st, 2nd and 3rd Carabinieri Regiments were disestablished and their Battalions were transferred under the direct operational and training authority of the 11th Mechanized Brigade; the 4th Mounted Carabinieri Regiment was renamed Mounted Carabinieri Regiment. The 1st Battalion became an autonomous unit and was renamed 1st Carabinieri Battalion "Piemonte". In 1977 the 1st Battalion was also granted the War Flag.

In late 1970s, each Carabinier Battalion establishes an "Intervention Platoon" in each Rifle Company.^{p. 191}

=== 2001 – present: 1st Carabinieri Mobile Brigade ===
With the transformation of the Arma dei Carabinieri in autonomous Armed Force, the 11th Carabinieri Brigade was split in two Brigades: the 1st Carabinieri Mobile Brigade controlled riot units (including the 1st Carabinieri Battalion "Piemonte"), while the 2nd Carabinieri Mobile Brigade was assigned combat-oriented Carabinieri Regiments. The two Carabinieri Mobile Brigades were grouped in the Carabinieri Mobile Units Division.

On 10 September 2014 the Battalion was elevated to Regiment as 1st Carabinieri Regiment "Piemonte"; the 2nd Carabinieri Battalion "Liguria" is under the Regiment command.

=== Commanders ===
During its existence, the Battalion (now Regiment) has been led by senior officers (Major to Colonel).

Battalion

- Lt. Col. Pietro Leone Demichelis (1949-1951)
- Maj. Raffaele Save (1952-1954)
- Maj. Augusto Izzo (1955-1956)
- Maj. Giovanni Montecucchi (1 September 1956 - 7 November 1958)
- Maj. Giovanni Robecchi (1959-1962)
- Lt. Col. Giovanni Montecucchi (12 June 1962 - 17 August 1962)
- Lt. Col. Guido Pepe (18 August 1962 - 28 September 1966)
- Lt. Col. Emilio Cantoni (29 September 1966 - 18 September 1969)
- Lt. Col. Giovanni Lucchetti (19 September 1969 - 24 August 1972)
- Lt. Col. Biagio Buono (25 August 1972 - 31 October 1975)
- Lt. Col. Giuseppe Pira (1 November 1975 - 19 September 1976)
- Lt. Col. Mario Cocco (20 September 1976 - 3 September 1979)
- Lt. Col. Vittorio Bonfanti (4 September 1979 - 10 July 1982)
- Lt. Col. Manlio Morelli (11 July 1982 - 23 October 1984)
- Lt. Col. Vincenzo Spallino (24 October 1984 - 24 August 1986)
- Lt. Col. Antonino Borzì (25 August 1986 - 19 September 1988)
- Lt. Col. Carlo Lepore (20 September 1988 - 8 January 1991)
- Lt. Col. Giorgio Vincenzo Piras (3 May 1991 - 2 November 1992)
- Lt. Col. Giambattista Giacchero (20 March 1993 - 15 September 1995)
- Lt. Col. Paolo Fabiano (16 September 1995 - 31 August 1998)
- Lt. Col. Salvatore Favarolo (28 September 1998 - 18 August 2000)
- Lt. Col. Benedetto Lauretti (19 August 2000 - 18 September 2002)
- Lt. Col. Giacinto Prencipe (19 September 2002 - 3 September 2005)
- Lt. Col. Pierfranco Diana (4 September 2005 - 4 September 2008)
- Col. Mario Mettifogo (23 September 2008 - 9 September 2014)

Regiment

- Col. Cristiano Desideri (10 September 2014 – present).

== Organization ==
The 1st Carabinieri Regiment "Piemonte" consists of the 1st Carabinieri Battalion "Piemonte" (primarily responsible for Piedmont and Aosta Valley) and of the 2nd Carabinieri Battalion "Liguria" (primarily responsible for Liguria).
