= 4th Carabinieri Mounted Regiment =

Coordinates: 41.9458°N 12.4822°E

- 4° Reggimento Carabinieri a Cavallo
- Active: 1963–present
- Country: Italy
- Branch: Carabinieri
- Type: Gendarmerie
- Role: Mounted units Rural patrol
- Size: Regiment
- Part of: 1st Carabinieri Mobile Brigade
- Garrison/HQ: "Tor Di Quinto" Barracks, Rome
- Anniversaries: 30 April (Battle of Pastrengo)

Commanders
- Current commander: Col. Paolo Galvaligi

The 4th Carabinieri Mounted Regiment (Italian: 4° Reggimento Carabinieri a Cavallo) is an Italian Carabinieri mounted police unit of the 1st Carabinieri Mobile Brigade. The regiment is tasked with riot control and rural patrol. It was formed on 1 April 1963 by merging smaller existing mounted units of the Carabinieri.

A Colonel commands the Regiment, which is located at the barracks "Tor di Quinto" in Rome. The Carabinieri Regiment is popular for their famous horse carousel that reaches reenacts the Carabinieri's charge at the Battle of Pastrengo.

== History ==
While mounted units of the Carabinieri existed since their inception, the 4th Carabinieri Mounted Regiment traces its origins to the formation of the 11th Carabinieri Mechanized Brigade. The brigade was established to adjust the organization of the Battalions and of cavalry units for both military and public order tasks. The aim was to ensure Carabinieri Battalions the availability of all elements necessary to be in a position to act in isolation and overcome considerable resistance without having to rely on the competition of other Army Corps or other Armed Forces, to ensure Battalions speed of movement and concentration in large sectors of foreseeable use and a constant high training level.

The 4th Cavalry Carabinieri Regiment (based from the beginning in Rome) was subordinated to the Brigade Command and consisted of 2 Squadrons Groups (Battalion-level units) and 1 Armoured-motorized Squadron:

- HQ and Command Squadron (company-level unit)
- Armoured Squadron (Public Security/Motorized)
- I Squadrons Group "Pastrengo"
- II Squadrons Group "Allievi"
- Equestrian Centre

On 15 June 1965, the regiment organization was heavily modified: the II Squadrons Group "Allievi" was transferred to the NCO School in Rome while three Territorial Squadrons Group in Milan, Cagliari and Palermo were reassigned to the command of the Regiment with the name of II, III and IV Squadrons Group. On 1 January 1966, the Regiment lost the Equestrian Centre. In 1967, the Regiment was given the Equestrian Sport Sections Detachment in Montelibretti.

On 31 October 1968, the Armoured-Motorized Squadron and the Squadrons Groups of Milan, Cagliari and Palermo were dissolved, leaving the Regiment with 1 Command Squadron and 1 Squadrons Group; the following day the II Squadrons Group was established. The Equestrian Sport Sections Detachment was disestablished and on 16 November 1968 the Regiment gained two Carabinieri Detachment Equestrian Sections both based in Montelibretti and Castro Pretorio.

In 1972 the Command Squadron was transformed in Command Unit, under the leadership of a Major or a Lieutenant Colonel and the post of Officer assigned to the Command was abolished. In 1974 the two Carabinieri Detachments Equestrian Sections were disbanded. In 1976 the Regiment regained the Equestrian Centre, and the following year the unit was renamed as the Carabinieri Cavalry Regiment.

In 2001 the Regiment was assigned to the newly formed 1st Carabinieri Mobile Brigade and in 2007 it regained the original name "4th Carabinieri Cavalry Regiment". In 2009 the Equestrian Sports Section was separated from the Regiment. A further regimental reorganisation took place in 2012.

== Organization ==
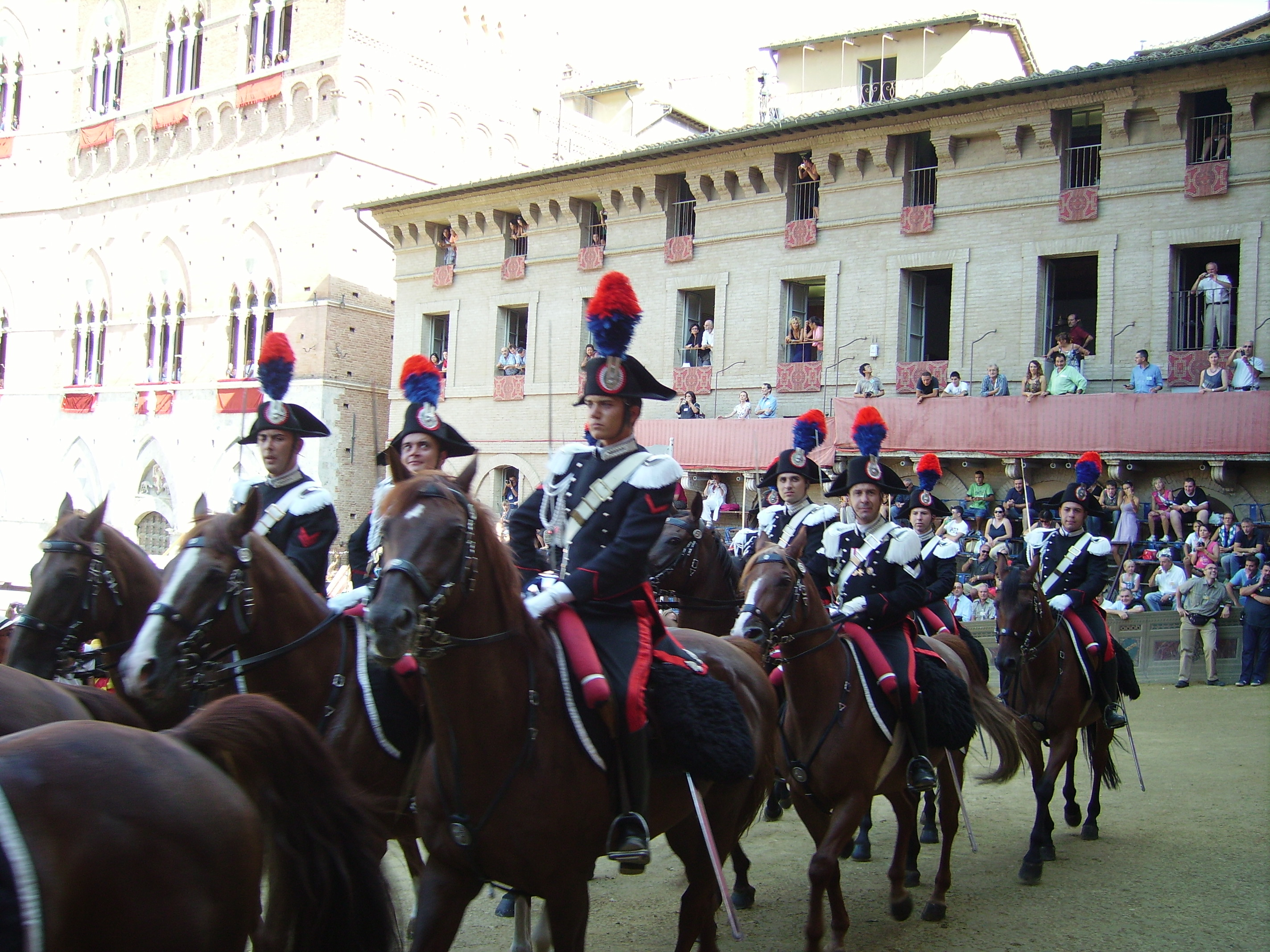
Mounted Carabinieri in Siena

Nowadays, the 4th Carabinieri Cavalry Regiment consists of:

- 1 Squadrons Group (2 Squadrons);
- 1 Equestrian Centre;
- 1 Command Office, 1 Command Squadron and 1 Quadrupeds Infirmary.

== Missions ==
Missions entrusted to the 4th Carabinieri Cavalry Regiment are varied. Ordinary activities include patrols in impervious areas on the national territory, participation in riot control, rescue and civil defence; alongside normal activities, the Regiment, through the Squadrons Group, carries out the Historic Carousle, an equestrian essay. Finally, the Regiment carries out honour services. The Equestrian Centre provides the equestrian training to Carabinieri, as well as sports activities based on riding.

== See also ==
- Skirmish of Pastrengo (1848)
- 1st Carabinieri Mobile Brigade
- Carabinieri Mobile Units Division
- Mounted police
