= 1st Carabinieri Mobile Brigade =

- 1° Brigata Mobile Carabinieri
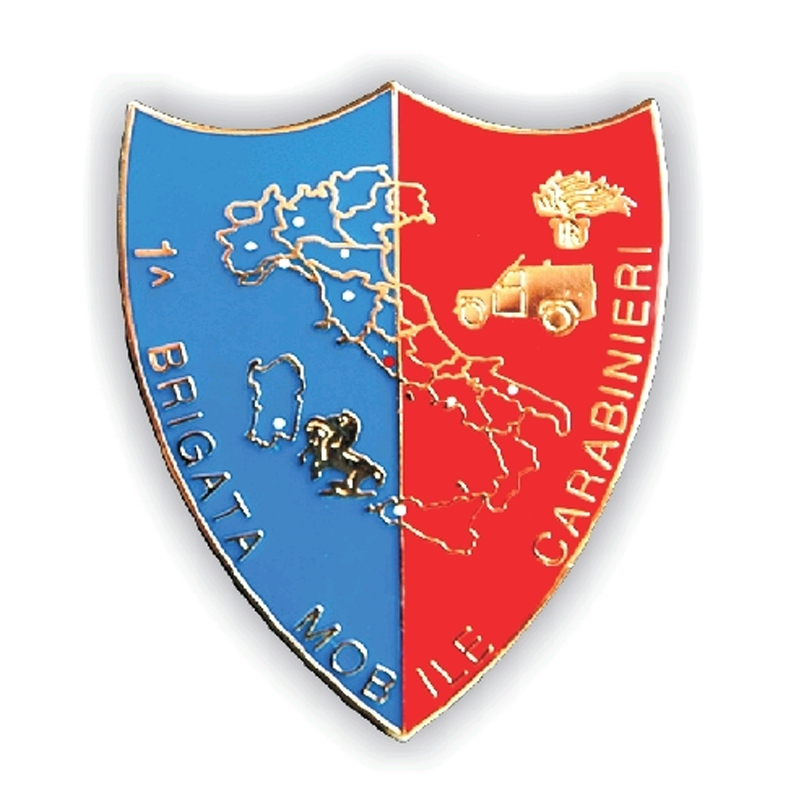
- Coat of arms of the 1st Carabinieri Mobile Brigade
- Active: 15 September 2001–present
- Country: Italy
- Branch: Carabinieri
- Type: Gendarmerie
- Role: Riot control
- Size: Brigade; 4,000 Carabinieri ca.
- Part of: Carabinieri Mobile Units Division
- Garrison/HQ: Rome

Commanders
- Current commander: Gen. B. Carlo Cerrina

The 1st Carabinieri Mobile Brigade (Italian: 1° Brigata Mobile Carabinieri) is a Carabinieri formation tasked with riot control, civil defence and security duties.

== History ==
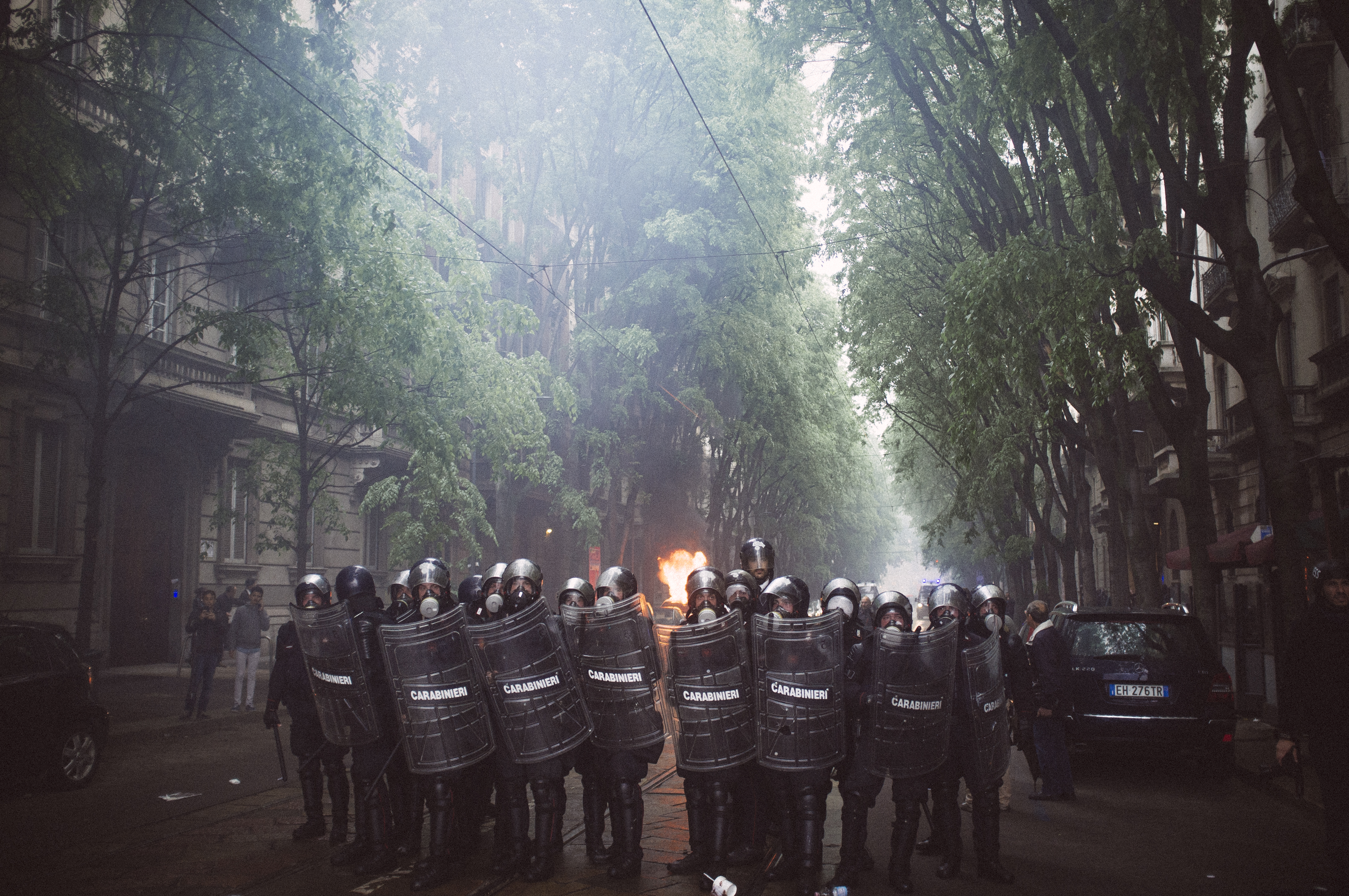
Carabinieri during riot control in 2015

While the 1st Carabinieri Mobile Brigade was established in its present form on 1 February 2001, together with Carabinieri Mobile Units Division, it can track its origins in the first formation grouping all Carabinieri units tasked with mobile, riot control and combat duties: the 11th Carabinieri Mechanized Brigade, established in 1963.

=== 1963-2001: 11th Carabinieri Brigade ===
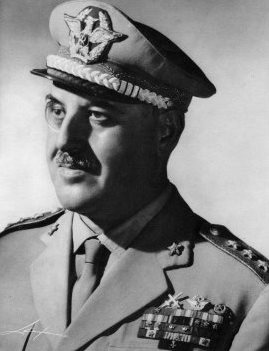
Lieutenant General Giovanni De Lorenzo established the XI Mechanized Brigade when he was Carabinieri Commandant-General.

Following the 1960 Genoa clashes, a reform project for the Mobile Battalions was envisioned, but later abandoned. Both the organization and the equipment (which included old Sherman tanks) were found to be obsolete either inadequate to emergency tasks.^{p. 48}

In 1963, with the 1960s Army and Carabinieri reorganization, the XI Carabinieri Mechanized Brigade was established directly under the General Command led by Giovanni De Lorenzo, in order to cope with the internal territorial defence needs. The establishment of the new brigade was in order to adjust the organization of the Battalions and of cavalry units both for strictly military tasks, and those related to the protection of public order. The aim was to ensure Carabinieri Battalions the availability of all elements necessary to be in a position to act in isolation and overcome considerable resistance without having to rely on the competition of other Army Corps or other Armed Forces, to ensure Battalions' speed of movement and concentration in large sectors of foreseeable use and a constant high training level.

Overall, the XI Carabinieri Mechanized Brigade consisted of about 5,000 men with 80 tracked vehicles, 200 other military vehicles, 130 M47 tanks and a paratroopers battalion. However, the brigade never had responsibility for actual unitary operational command, lacking supports due to a political choice, but exercised the tasks of instruction and preparation for the riot control activities.

In the reorganization, Mobile Battalions were renamed simply Battalions and were marked with a sequential number, while remaining administratively dependent on the relevant Legion; the Battalions Groups were renamed Carabinieri Regiments, and were given the conceptual role of a resolution unit in both riot and tactical tasks; According original resolutions, Regiments were to have only disciplinary, training and deployment functions, while general management rested within the relevant Legion. The newly formed Mechanized Brigade exercised its operational and training authority on:

- 1st Carabinieri Regiment (HQ Milan): commanding I, II, III and IV Battalions;
- 2nd Carabinieri Regiment (HQ Rome): commanding V, VI, VIII and IX Battalions;
- 3rd Carabinieri Regiment (HQ Naples): commanding X, XI and XII Battalions;
- 4th Mounted Carabinieri Regiment (HQ Rome) with 2 Squadrons Groups (Battalion-level units) and 1 Armoured-motorized Squadron;
- VII Battalion (directly under the Brigade Command), under IV Army Corps; despite being the newest Battalion, the unit inherited traditions and number of the second battalion of Rome, which was disestablished.
- XIII Battalion (directly under the Brigade Command), under V Army Corps.

The command structure of the XI Carabinieri Mechanized Brigade consisted of:

- Staff, with personnel management and training bodies;
- Services Office, with activation and research tasks;
- Army officers of Transmissions and Motorization organizations, with management, technical, inspecting and consulting tasks.

Each Carabinieri Battalion was led by a lieutenant colonel or a major and consisted of: 1 Command Company (1 Command Platoon, 1 Services Platoon, 1 Scouts Platoon), 2 Rifle Companies (command platoon, 3 rifle platoons, 1 company weapons platoon each), 1 Mortars Company and 1 Tanks Company (Command Platoon, 3 Tanks Platoons). It was therefore a robust tactical complex. The Carabinieri Battalions had to be used only when the police and the local organization of the Carabinieri they had found insufficient, in order not to deprive the General Command of a valuable combat tool. Within the VII Battalion, based in Laives, the Counter-terrorism Special Company was established in 1960s to counter South Tyrolean terrorism;^{p. 187} the security operations were also supported by several Trucked Units. Both VII and XIII Battalions were to be always maintained at their full wartime force.

The establishment of the XI Carabinieri Mechanized Brigade was controversial: some senior officers criticized the decision, deeming that the essential features of the Carabinieri were capillarity and focus on criminal police activity. However, the 1963 reorganization did not mark the end of the organizational shifts. In 1964, 1st Carabinieri Helicopter Section was established.

The XI Brigade was subordinated, on 7 March 1965, to the Inspectorate of Mechanized and Special Units, which included not only the XI Mechanized Brigade, but also all other tactical Carabinieri units: the Carabinieri Paratroopers Battalion, the Territorial Squadrons Groups of Milan, Cagliari and Palermo, the Trucked Units, as well as the naval service. Two years later, on 10 March 1967, the post was modified in "Inspectorate of Mechanized Units", being disbanded in May 1967. In 1968 the blue beret was modified, making it identical in shape to the maroon beret used by paratroopers. Between 1967 and 1968 it was set up the Inspectorate of Mechanized and Training Units (led by a Divisional general), with responsibility on the X Carabinieri Brigade (including schools) and XI Carabinieri Mechanized Brigade. In 1971 it was established the Inspectorate Schools and Special Carabinieri Units; it controlled the X Brigade (dedicated to training) and XI Brigade.

In 1969, Battalions framed within Carabinieri Regiments were reorganized. The new structure consisted of Battalion Command Unit, Command and Services Company (Command and Services Platoon, Scouts Platoon, Transmissions Platoon, Tanks Platoon, Transportations Platoon), 2 Mechanized Rifle Companies (Command and Services Platoon, 3 Rifle Platoons, Mortars Platoons).

Between 1973 and 1976, the 5th Carabinieri Regiment (HQ Mestre) also existed, including IV, VII and XIII Battalions. On 1 September 1977, 1st, 2nd and 3rd Carabinieri Regiments were disestablished and their Battalions were transferred under the direct operational and training authority of the 11th Mechanized Brigade; the 4th Mounted Carabinieri Regiment was renamed Mounted Carabinieri Regiment. In 1975 the XI Carabinieri Mechanized Brigade changed its name in 11th Carabinieri Mechanized Brigade (with Arabic numerals) and in 1976 the formation was renamed 11th Carabinieri Brigade; at the same time, the Brigade Command was tasked to exercise only training and logistical authority.

In 1977, the three Carabinieri Regiments were disestablished and 4th Carabinieri Cavalry Regiment changed its name in Carabinieri Cavalry Regiment, with the Battalions being directly under the Brigade Command. The following year an Inspecting Colonel was appointed, while in 1979 two additional Colonels followed.

In 1980, the Inspectorate changed its name to Command Division School and Special Carabinieri Units "Palidoro". In 1985, the department was deprived of training component and was reorganized on the XI Brigade (Carabinieri Battalions) and the XII Brigade (specialist units); the brigade was therefore placed under a command called Carabinieri Mobile and Special Units Division "Palidoro".

Overall, Carabinieri Battalions were divided into two groups, according to the main type (motorized or mechanized unit) of unit the unit deployed.

==== Operations ====
During the Years of Lead and the subsequent period, however, most of the Battalions reduced their military training in order to deal with riot control activities. 7th and 13th Battalions maintained instead their military capabilities and were transferred under direct Army operational control. Each infantry company of each Battalion established, in this period, an "Intervention Platoon", in order to upgrade the responsiveness to serious riots.^{p. 191}

In the 1976 Friuli earthquake, the XIII Carabinieri Battalion "Friuli Venezia Giulia", IV Carabinieri Battalion "Veneto" and VII Carabinieri Battalion "Trentino Alto Adige" intervened paying rescue and providing police and utility services. In the 1980 Irpinia earthquake Carabinieri Battalions from Bari, Naples and Rome also intervened.^{pp. 203–204}

=== 2001-present day: 1st Carabinieri Mobile Brigade ===
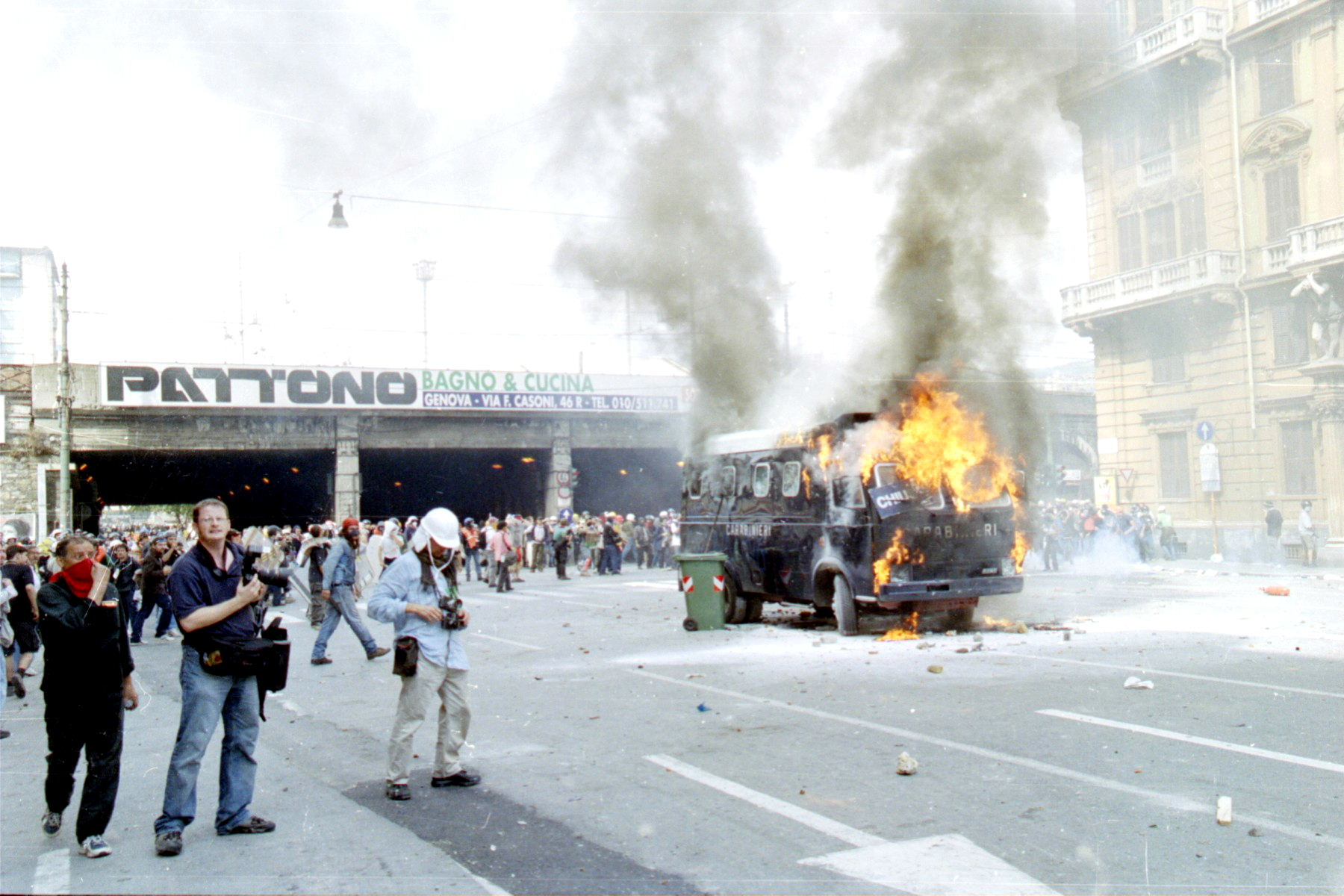
Protesters burn a Carabinieri vehicle during the 27th G8 summit.

With the transformation of the Arma dei Carabinieri in autonomous Armed Force, the 11th Carabinieri Brigade was split in two Brigades: the 1st Carabinieri Mobile Brigade controlled riot units, the 2nd Carabinieri Mobile Brigade was assigned combat-oriented Carabinieri Regiments. The two Carabinieri Mobile Brigades were grouped in the Carabinieri Mobile Units Division.

The 1st Carabinieri Mobile Brigade was initially headquartered in Rome; in 2001 it was transferred in Treviso; in 2013 it was moved back in Rome.

Some of its subordinate units, from being all Battalion-level entities, have been raised to the regimental status. On 10 September 2014 the 1st Carabinieri Battalion "Piemonte" was raised to Regimental status as 1st Carabinieri Regiment "Piemonte"; the 11th Carabinieri Battalion "Puglia" was raised to Regimental status on 18 September 2017.

==== Operations ====
The first major engagement of the newly formed Brigade was the 27th G8 summit, a major protest, drawing an estimated 200,000 demonstrators. Clashed erupted heavily; 329 people were arrested and over 400 protesters and about 100 among security forces were injured during the clashes.

On the occasion, Carabinieri formed the shortly-existed Compagnie di contenimento e intervento risolutivo, units formed with personnel drawn from existing Battalions of the 1st Carabinieri Mobile Brigade (Battalions "Lombardia", "Lazio", "Toscana", "Campania" and "Sicilia"), integrated with personnel drawn from the more military-oriented 2nd Carabinieri Mobile Brigade. Critics of the CCIR frequently point out the militarization of police brought by the establishment of such units.

On July 20, 23-year-old activist Carlo Giuliani of Genoa, was shot dead by Mario Placanica, a Carabiniere, during clashes with police. On 14 July 2007, 13 Italian Carabineri, GOMPI Mobile and prison police were convicted for abuse of authority, abuse of office and uniform. Other charges included abuse and negligence.

== Mission ==
The 1st Carabinieri Mobile Brigade is tasked with:

- Participation to the integrated defence of the national territory;
- Participation in crowd and riot control during large demonstrations and events;
- Surveillance on sensitive military objectives and those of civil nature defined, from time to time, by the Public Security authority;
- Support to territorial organization to increase control of the territory in large urban and rural areas in the most sensitive areas in terms of public security;
- Civil protection.

== Organization ==
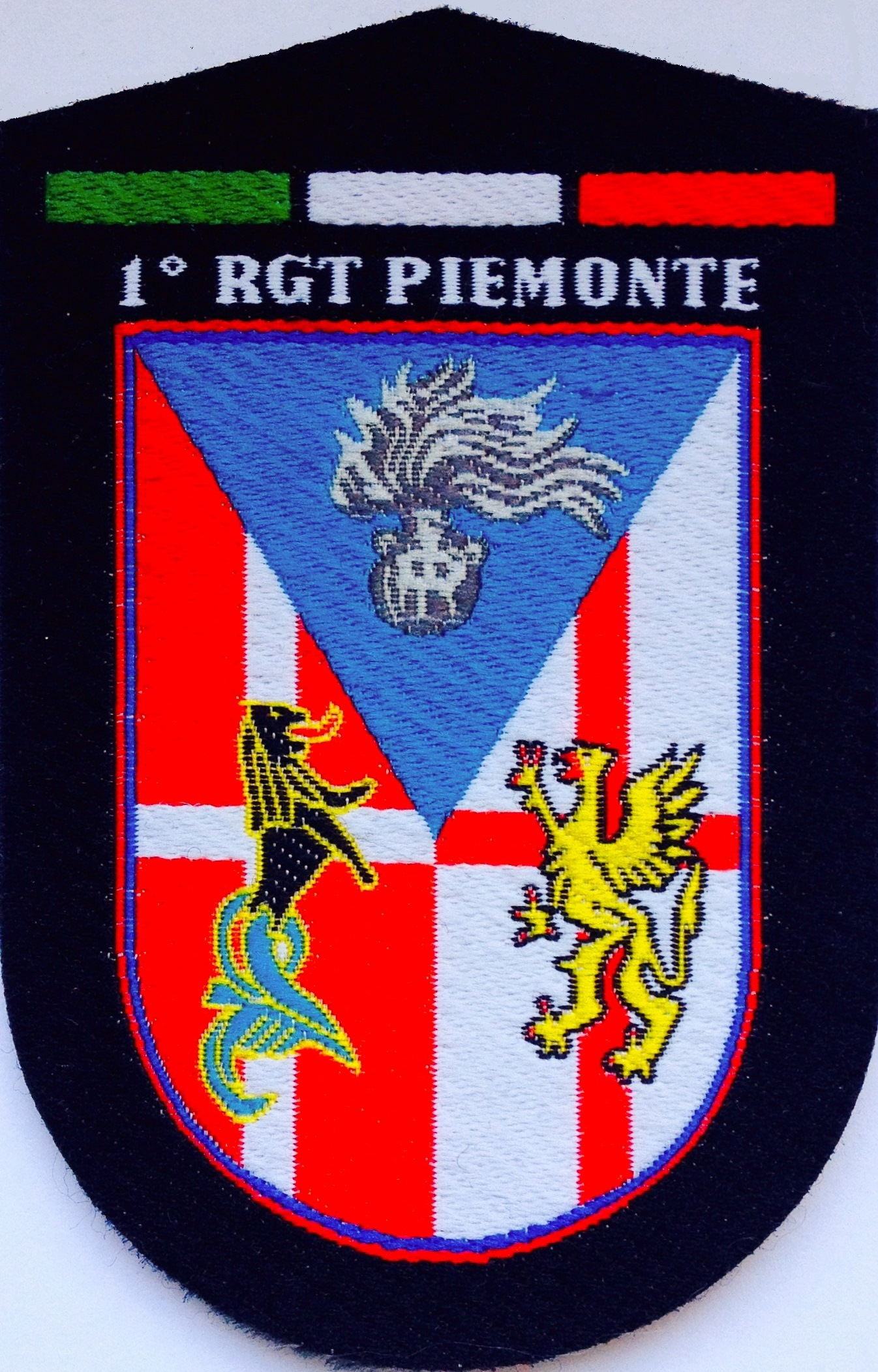
Emblem of 1st Carabinieri Regiment "Piemonte"

The 1st Carabinieri Mobile Brigade is commanded by a Brigadier general, who in turn is assisted by a Staff. Subordinate units include thirteen regiments and battalions:

- 1st Carabinieri Regiment "Piemonte" in Moncalieri
  - 2nd Carabinieri Battalion "Liguria" in Genoa
- 3rd Carabinieri Regiment "Lombardia" in Milan
- 4th Carabinieri Cavalry Regiment in Rome
- 5th Carabinieri Regiment "Emilia-Romagna" in Bologna
  - 6th Carabinieri Battalion "Toscana" in Florence
- 8th Carabinieri Regiment "Lazio" in Rome
  - 9th Carabinieri Battalion "Sardegna" in Cagliari
- 10th Carabinieri Regiment "Campania" in Naples
- 4th Carabinieri Battalion "Veneto" in Mestre
- 11th Carabinieri Regiment "Puglia" in Bari
- 12th Carabinieri Regiment "Sicilia" in Palermo
- 14th Carabinieri Battalion "Calabria" in Vibo Valentia

=== Operational Intervention Company ===
The "Operational Intervention Companies" (Italian: Compagnie Intervento Operativo) are 7 units are designed to cope with the appropriate urgency in sudden danger to public security, thanks to the special training of personnel and the allocation of substantial vehicles and materials, intervening whenever the resurgence of particular crimes, especially those of predatory character, requires even more intense and visible control activity. Companies operate in small squads performing patrols in the urban context; they are also employed in extensive territorial control activities, such as patrols, checkpoints, spot-checks and raids.

They have been established in 2000, within the 8th Carabinieri Regiment "Lazio" in Rome and within the Carabinieri Battalions in Milan, Florence, Naples, Bari, Palermo, Vibo Valentia and Mestre.

Carabinieri assigned to the Operational Intervention Companies are selected and specially trained in Velletri to detect and deal with dangerous individuals, such as former offenders, drugs dealers and others. The training includes hand-to-hand combat, disarmament techniques, shooting and riot procedures.

=== Rescue Units ===
In order to allow Carabinieri Battalions to deal with emergencies in case of public calamity, special Rescue Units are established, when needed, within the individual Carabinieri Battalions. These Rescue Units are previously trained and provided with equipment and materials which allow them to provide initial assistance to people affected while awaiting the intervention of the civil protection system.

== See also ==
- Carabinieri Mobile Units Division
- 2nd Carabinieri Mobile Brigade
- 14th Carabinieri Battalion "Calabria"
- Carabinieri Cavalry Regiment
- Riot police
