= Mobile Unit (Italy) =

Italian civilian riot police unit

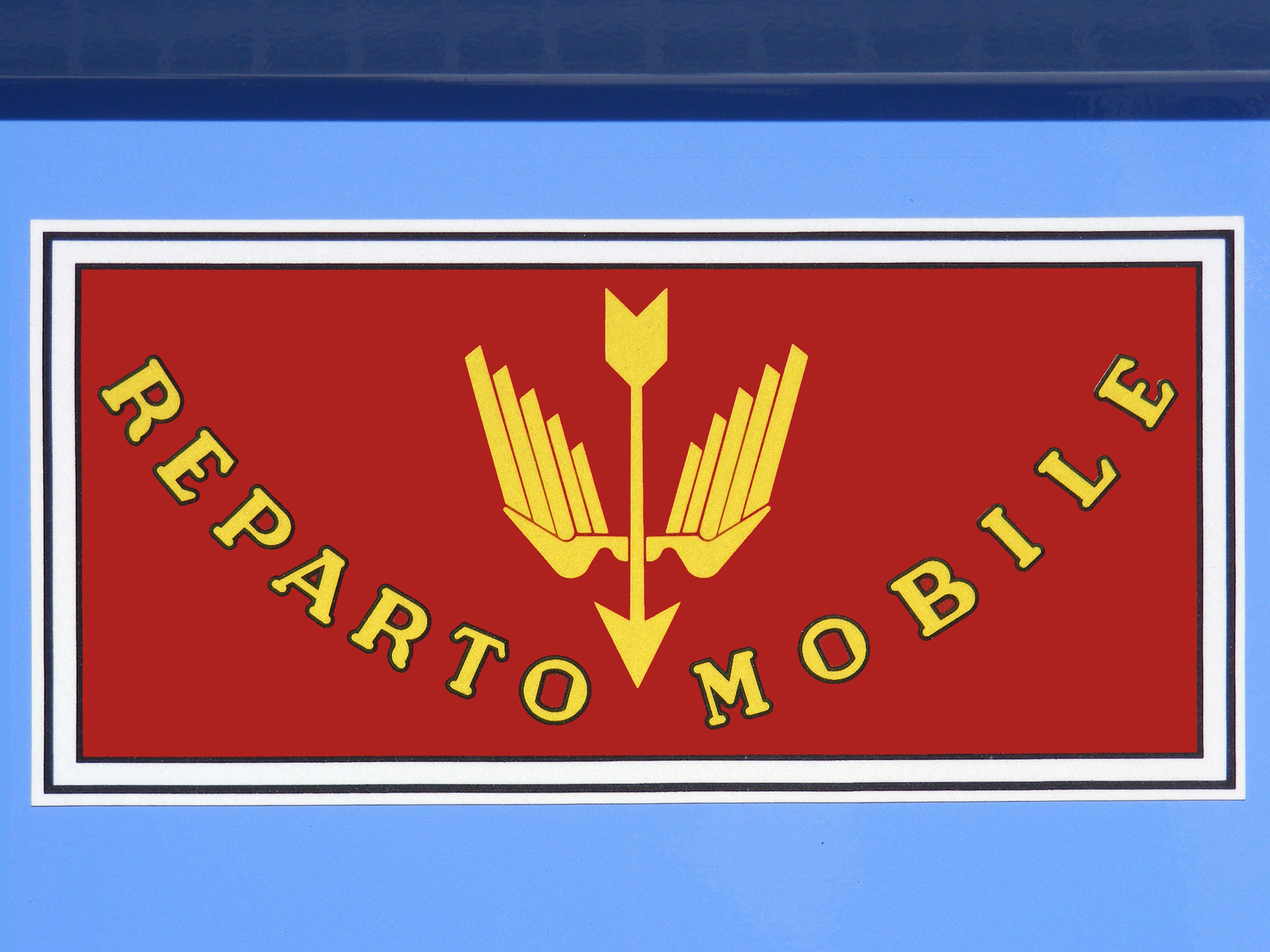
Distinctive vehicle insignia for Mobile units vehicles.

In Italy, the Mobile Units (Italian: Reparti Mobili) of the Polizia di Stato, often generically identified as a "Celere Units", are the police units used as a ready-to-use resource for riot control and for intervention in areas affected by disasters. As of 2026, there are 15 mobile departments and are located in the cities of Rome, Turin, Florence, Reggio Calabria, Milan, Genoa, Naples, Palermo, Catania, Bologna, Padua, Cagliari, Senigallia, Bari and Taranto.

== History ==
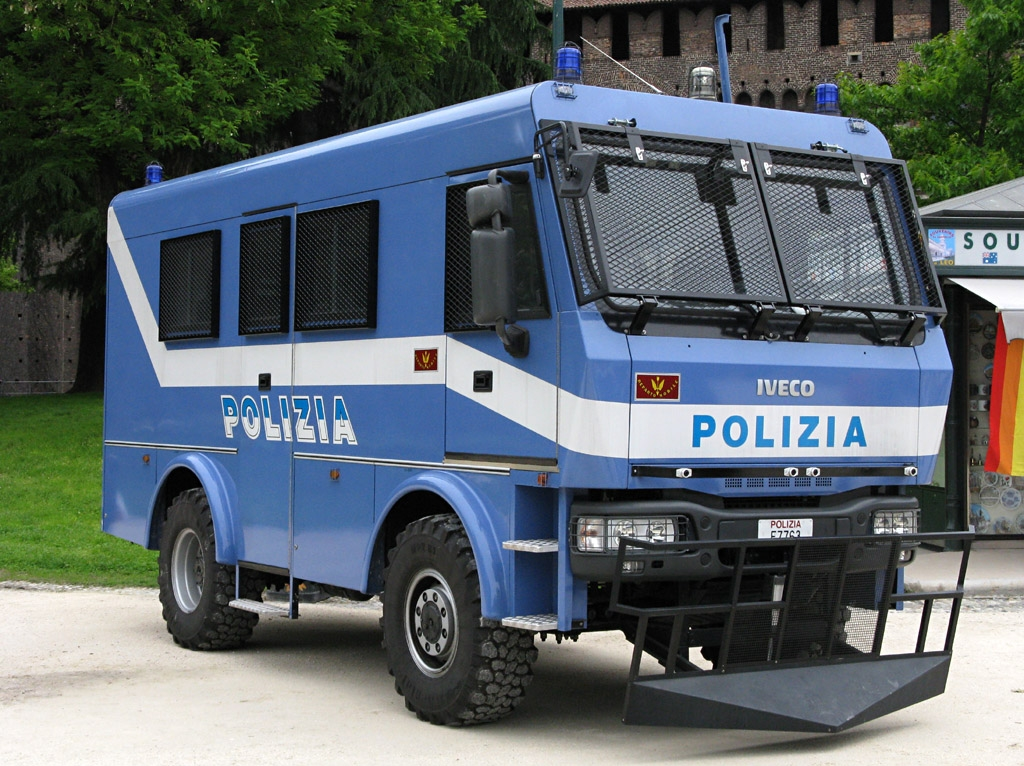
Iveco Eurocargo 4x4 of the Polizia di Stato.

The history of the Mobile Units dates back to the second post-war period.

=== Establishment of the Celere units ===
At the end of the Second World War, the main requirement of the police apparatus was to restore public order in the chaotic period. The Corps of Guards of Public Security had on the territory the so-called "Mobile Units", created for tactical purposes and therefore equipped with heavy weaponry that had to fulfill defensive tasks of the territory in case of external invasion: mortars, submachine guns, T17 armoured vehicles, "Lince" armored cars were part of the equipment of these operational units. The Interior Ministry also requisitioned all sorts of vehicles and armaments left on the territory by the various invading armies. Their tasks of defense of the national territory soon became tasks of protection of public order.

The Carabinieri refrained from engaging in riot control or maintenance of public order and, therefore, the burden fell on the shoulders of the Corps of Guards of Public Security.^{p. 89} For this purpose, the Celere units were established by Giuseppe Romita in 1947.^{p. 24}

Directly subordinate to the Chief of Police, the Celere units were initially three, based in Rome, Padua and Milan. In the years of reconstruction, the Celere units were equipped mostly with jeeps (Willys Jeep), Italian off-road vehicles (Fiat Campagnola, since 1952) and light trucks (OM CL 52). There were, however, also armoured companies and some motorcyclists.

In the following years, other Celere units were established in Bologna, Turin, Genoa, Florence, Naples, Reggio Calabria, Bari (with detachment in Taranto), Palermo, Catania and Cagliari.^{p. 24}

=== 1948-1960: Mobile and Celere Units ===
Between 1948 and 1960, there were 20 Mobile Units and three Celere Units.

Mobile Units were organised with 3 to 4 Mobile Companies and 1 Armoured Cars Company. Within these units, public relief battalions were created to intervene in the event of natural disasters. A similar organization was carefully studied also by the police of foreign states.^{p. 24}

- 1st Mobile Unit: Turin;
- 2nd Mobile Unit: Busto Arsizio;
- 3rd Mobile Unit: Piacenza;
- 4th Mobile Unit: Genoa;
- 5th Mobile Unit: Vicenza;
- 6th Mobile Unit: Bologna;
- 7th Mobile Unit: Senigallia;
- 8th Mobile Unit: Florence;
- 9th Mobile Unit: Naples;
- 10th Mobile Unit: Foggia;
- 11th Mobile Unit: Bari:
- 12th Mobile Unit: Catania;
- 13th Mobile Unit: Palermo;
- 14th Mobile Unit: Alessandria;
- 15th Mobile Unit: Peschiera del Garda;
- 16th Mobile Unit: Parma;
- 17th Mobile Unit: Foggia;
- 18th Mobile Unit: Vibo Valentia;
- 19th Mobile Unit: Novara;
- 20th Mobile Unit: Cesena;

Celere Units had the same organisation of the Mobile Units, but were considered better equipped and trained. As of 1947, there were three Celere units:

- 1st Celere Unit: Rome;
- 2nd Celere Unit: Padua;
- 3rd Celere Unit: Milan.

In summer 1953, the Mobile Units were deployed at the border with Jugoslavia, at the height of the political crisis over Trieste; the following year, a detachment of the 2nd Celere Unit (based in Padua) was the first Italian military unit to enter in Trieste.^{p. 31} From the end of the 1950s, the Mobile units merged into the Celere units.^{p. 25}

In the 1950s, the repressive aspect put in place by the Celere units began to tend to avoid as much as possible the physical battle between the guards and the demonstrators. The riot control tactics implemented the charges carried on board the means, at the time American war residues. The "Celere" was equipped with specialized means for riot control, such as hydrants.^{p. 28}

=== 1960 - 1981 ===
In the 1960s, the Celere units modernized their equipment, receiving Italian vans, FIAT 6640 armoured cars, more suited to the troops transport and to the breakthrough of road barricades.^{p. 49} Late 1960s were marked by extensive riots and clashes. In order to fight the Sardinian banditry, the "Blue Berets" were drawn from the 2nd Celere unit (based in Padua) and deployed in the Sardinian interior between January 1967 and October 1970.^{pp. 70–71}

In the late 1960s, the Celere units were reorganized, until 1976, in four groups, born from the transformation of the three original units with the addition of that of Naples.^{pp. 70–71}

In the 1970s, the Police proceeded to adapt men, resources and resources. A gray-green suit and a beret were introduced as operational uniform for Celere units; helmets were equipped with an impact-resistant plastic visor; the Beretta M1934 pistols were replaced with the M51; the Beretta M12 submachine gun was introduced.^{p. 81}

In terms of vehicles, in the "Celere" departments the new OM and FIAT "shielded" vans were introduced, with bulletproof glass, ventilation systems that prevent the inhalation of tear gas and equipped with movable metal gratings against the throwing of stones.

=== 1981 - present: Polizia di Stato ===
Following the demilitarization of the Corps of Guards of Public Security and the establishment of the Polizia di Stato occurred in 1981, in 1985 Celere Units reassumed the old denomination of Mobile Units.^{p. 105} In 1990, on the occasion of the 1990 FIFA World Cup held in Italy, the Mobile Units changed the operational riot uniform, with the old gray-green suit replaced by the current gray-blue suit; further adjustments were made to it at the G8 summit held in Genoa in July 2001.^{p. 105}

Starting from 2001, the 13 Mobile Units then present became another specialty of the Polizia di Stato; this change obliges all the policemen belonging to the Mobile Units to attend special specialization and updating courses on riot control and public rescue.^{p. 105}

The self-protection equipment of each agent of the Mobile Units was progressively increased, up to the adoption of protections for the back, arms and legs and gas masks, which prevent the inhalation of tear gas. A new type of shield was also introduced, this time round in shape and more manageable than the rectangular one. The same Mobile Units were equipped with specific vehicles for the sector: a new type of hydrant, new vans for the transport of the teams and for riot control services, mechanical vehicles for public rescue.^{p. 105} Since 2018, women are allowed to serve in Mobile Units.

== Management ==
Mobile Units of the Polizia di Stato depend on the Central Directorate of Specialities, Service for Special Units, 1st Division. The deployment of the Mobile Units is operated by the Public Order Office, within the Secretariat of the Department of Public Security.

== Organisation ==
Each Mobile Unit is organised in a similar way, independently from its dimensions. The Mobile Unit has:

- Direction;
- Administration office;
- Administration team;
- Operational Nuclei;

The XII Mobile Unit in Reggio Calabria also has an anti-sabotage team. The leadership of the Unit is entrusted, ordinarily, to a director (Primo Dirigente), assisted by a deputy director.

At each mobile department a personnel quota must consist of CBRN defense specialists as well as, in the past, also by a sufficient number of trumpeter agents, who have now disappeared since each charge is currently preceded and accompanied by the sound of the sirens.

== See also ==
- Polizia di Stato
- Carabinieri Mobile Units Division
- Riot control
