= 14th Carabinieri Battalion "Calabria" =

- 14° Battaglione carabinieri "Calabria"
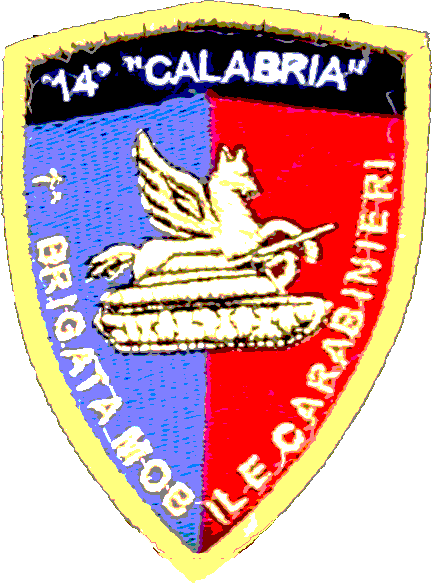
- Sleeve patch 14th Carabinieri Battalion "Calabria"
- Active: 1 March 2017-present
- Country: Italy
- Branch: Carabinieri
- Type: Gendarmerie
- Role: Riot control, territorial control, fugitives arrest
- Size: Battalion
- Part of: 1st Carabinieri Mobile Brigade
- Headquarters: “Luigi Razza” Barracks

Commanders
- Current commander: Ten. Col. Samuele Sighinolfi

The 14th Carabinieri Battalion "Calabria" (Italian: 14° Battaglione Carabinieri "Calabria") is a Carabinieri riot control unit headquartered in Vibo Valentia, established on 1 March 2017, in order to increase the Carabinieri presence in Calabria. The unit is tasked with riot control and search activities.

The unit was established in order to strengthen the Carabinieri role in the territorial control and riot control tasks in Calabria, mainly against 'Ndrangheta. The unit, according to the official statements made by Interior Minister Marco Minniti, is to be also involved in searches for fugitives, in coordination with the Carabinieri Squadron “Cacciatori di Calabria”, as well as sensitive targets surveillance and territorial support.

The Battalion is based in the Caserma "Luigi Razza" in Vibo Valentia, the same of the Squadron “Cacciatori di Calabria”.

According to Commandant-general Del Sette, the Battalion has one Company specialized in riot control and one Company specialized in providing support to the Carabinieri territorial organization.

Lieutenant Colonel Verticchio, commander of the Battalion, assumed office on 9 March 2017.

On 14 July 2017, the War Flag was granted to the 14th Carabinieri Battalion "Calabria" by President of the Republic Sergio Mattarella.

== List of Commanders ==
- Ten. Col. Milko Verticchio: 1 March 2017 - 10 September 2020
- Ten. Col. Samuele Sighinolfi: 11 September 2020 - incumbent

== Related voices ==
- Carabinieri
- Carabinieri Mobile Units Division
- 1st Carabinieri Mobile Brigade
- Riot control
- 'Ndrangheta
