= 11th Carabinieri Mechanized Brigade =

Italian military brigade

Coordinates: 45.6887°N 12.2573°E

- 11° Brigata Meccanizzata Carabinieri
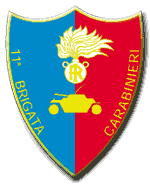
- Emblem of the 11th Carabinieri Brigade
- Active: 1 April 1963 - 1 February 2001
- Country: Italy
- Branch: Carabinieri
- Type: Gendarmerie
- Role: Military tasks and riot control
- Size: 5000 troops ca. Brigade
- Part of: Inspectorate of Mechanized and Special Units (1965-1967); Inspectorate of Mechanized Units (1967); Inspectorate of Mechanized and Training Units (1967-1971); Inspectorate Schools and Special Carabinieri Units (1971-1980); Carabinieri Division School and Special Carabinieri Units "Palidoro" (1980-1985); Carabinieri Mobile and Special Units Division "Palidoro" (1985-2001)
- Garrison/HQ: Rome

Commanders
- Notable commanders: Franco Picchiotti, Pietro Loretelli

The 11th Carabinieri Mechanized Brigade (Italian: 11° Brigata Meccanizzata Carabinieri) was the Carabinieri formation, established in 1963 and disestablished in 2001, dedicated to the performance of military duties, the support to Territorial Organization, the participation in civil protection operations and to ensure the emergency reserve for the General Command.

== Background ==
Carabinieri units devoted to the riot control and to tactical tasks experienced several organizational phases, from late 1910s to the present day. While from 1919 until 1963 Carabinieri riot units were under the exclusive control of Carabinieri Legions (inter-provincial commands), since 1963 they have been under an unified command: from 1963 to 2000 the Command was set at the Brigade level, while the present-day Division was established in 2001.

=== 1919-1923 ===
The history of the branch of the Carabinieri specifically dedicated to quell massive civil disturbances dates back in 1919, when 18 Carabinieri Autonomous Mobile Battalions (Battaglioni Mobili Autonomi) were established in order to deal with the Biennio Rosso.

Before 1919, the operational approach to riot control consisted in drawing Carabinieri from the territorial stations near the event, replacing them with Carabinieri drawn in turn from other Stations; since 1908 several proposes had been made by Carabinieri officers to form organic Carabinieri units in order not to steal Carabinieri from the territorial police service and to improve the harmony within the ranks of Carabinieri assigned to public order services;^{pp. 271–273} the proposal was suspended due to the outbreak of the World War I.^{p. 14}

At the end of the World War I, the Royal Italian Army was reduced and both the Royal Carabinieri and the Royal Guard of Public Security were augmented.^{p. 268} Following the end of the War, participants to rallies increased in numbers and Army units deployed in internal order services significantly decreased. The Arm of Carabinieri, in order to sustain the increasingly heavy duty, established for the first time outside war several Army-style Battalions.^{pp. 269–270}

On 7 December 1918, the Carabinieri General Command elaborated a proposal for War Minister Alberico Albricci, assuming the establishment of 15^{p. 282} to 16^{p. 16} Mobile Battalions under the relevant Carabinieri Legion. The total strength of the Mobile Battalions was envisioned in 5,000 Carabinieri. According to the proposal, each Battalion should have had 5 trucks with attached drivers and mechanics, two motorcycles for commanders of the detachments and a light car for the commanding Colonel.^{pp. 280–282} Under the 1918 proposal, Legions with two Mobile Battalions assigned were to be led by a Brigadier General, with two Colonels, one of which assigned to the task of commanding the Battalioni Group.^{p. 16}

On 13 March 1919, the War Ministry ordered the provisional establishment of 16 Carabinieir Mobile Battalions, whose organization was to be dealt with by the General Command.^{p. 16} On 30 March 1919, Commandant General Luigi Cauvin issued executive orders of the establishment of the Mobile Battalions of the Royal Carabinieri. According to Article 3 of the executive orders, the Carabinieri Mobile Battalion was organized into:^{p. 17}

- 3 Infantry Companies, (4 Platoons each);
- 1 Cyclists Companies (2 Platoons).

Each Mobile Battalion was to be led by a Lieutenant Colonel (Mobile Battalions of Alessandria, Genoa, Verona, Trieste, Treviso, Bologna, Ancona, Cagliari, Bari, two of the three Battalions of Rome, one of the two Battalions of Turin, Milan, Naples, Florence and Palermo)^{p. 19} or by a Major (Mobile Battalions of Udine, Taranto, Catania, one Mobile Battalion in Rome, Turin, Milan, Florence, Naples and Palermo),^{p. 19} assisted by an Aide ranking Lieutenant, each Company was to be led by a captain, while Platoons could be led by a Lieutenant, a Second Lieutenant or by a senior Sub-Officer.^{p. 17} The strength of each Mobile Battalions was to be 782 officers and troops. According to Article 7, Carabinieri of the Mobile Battalions were to be deployed in organic units (Platoon, Company, or the whole Battalion) always under their own subofficers and officers. The training was specifically designed for public order and riot control services.^{pp. 284–286} One quarter of the strength of each battalion was to be assigned to the territorial support of the relevant Legion.^{p. 17} Battalions were to be housed in separate barracks, from other Royal Carabinieri and, in case of more than one Battalion assigned to the same city, on the opposite side of the urban centre; at least one officer had to be housed in the barracks.^{p. 18}

On 25 August 1919, another study elaborated by the General Command proposed the establishment of Mobile Battalions as a quick reaction force, also in response to insurrections to be dealt with by the Army. The 1919 proposal envisioned therefore a mechanized unit consisting of Cyclist Companies, special trains (also available for natural disasters), and fast trucks; the training for personnel assigned to the Battalions was designed in order to improve the cohesion and decision.^{pp. 283–284}

The Royal Decree of 2 October 1919, no. 1802 sanctioned the existing situation, authorizing the establishment of the Carabinieri Mobile Battalions.^{p. 21}

By force of the Royal Decree of 20 April 1920, no. 451, eighteen Autonomous Mobile Battalions were established.^{pp. 279–280} The autonomous mobile Battalions took the name of their seat and were marked with serial number if more than one Battalion were assigned in the same city: Turin (2 Battalions), Alessandria, Genoa, Milan (2 Battalions), Verona, Florence, Bologna, Ancona, Rome (2 Battalions), Naples (2 Battalions), Bari, Palermo, Catania. The 1920 Battalions were organized on:

- 3 Carabinieri on foot companies;
- 1 Cyclist Carabinieri Company;
- 1 Machine-guns Section (2 Sections for seven Mobile Battalions: Torino 1°, Milano 1°, Firenze, Roma 1°, Roma 2°, Roma 3°, Palermo).^{p. 24}

Each Battalion had a total force of 750 men under the command of a lieutenant colonel.^{pp. 279–280} Mobile Battalions in Alessandria, Treviso, Cagliari, Catanzaro and Messina were established outside the 1918 plan, due to evolving needs.^{pp. 280–282}

Two years later, in 1922, six Battalions were disestablished and at the next year the remaining Battalions followed. However, three Battalions subordinated to the local Legion remained in existence: two in Rome and one in Palermo.

=== Operations ===
The first period of existence of Mobile Battalions was short but intense. In 1919 the most serious disturbances occurred in Novara, Milan, Brescia, Rome, Piombino, Viareggio, Corenza and Venice, Apulia and Piedmont. The 1st Bersaglieri Regiment mutinied in Ancona in June 1920, but it was brought down by a Carabinieri Battalion. In 1921 serious disturbances erupted in several municipalities of Campania, including Castellamare di Stabia, in the major towns and cities of Tuscany, in Apulia, including Bari, and in Rome. In the same years, the Blackshirts movement clashed with leftist formations and strikes increased.

Between 1919 and 1920, the Carabinieri performed 233 public order and riot control operations and suffered 517 casualties (43 dead and 474 wounded). Facing increasingly combative demonstrations, the government authorities left loose rules of engagement to the police forces, with the result of bloody clashes.

According to Arnaldo Grilli and Antonio Picci, between 1919 and 1922, Carabinieri Mobile Battalions were awarded with 2 Gold Medals of Military Valour, 55 Silver Medals of Military Valour, 62 Bronze Medals of Military Valour, as well as hundreds of Solemn commendations.

=== 1940-1963 ===
In 1940 the new Army organization foresaw four Carabinieri Battalions, while on 3 January 1944 12 Battalions (renamed Mobile Battalions) were re-established,^{p. 232} in order to deal with the civil unrest following the end of the civil war, along with four Mobile Battalions Groups. The 1944-established Mobile Battalions were equipped, supplied and maintained by the relevant Carabinieri Legion. The Mobile Battalions Groups were:

- 1st Group (HQ Milan), subordinated to the 1st Carabinieri Division "Pastrengo" and including Battalions based in Turin, Milan, Genoa and Padua;
- 2nd Group (HQ Florence), subordinated to the 2nd Carabinieri Division "Podgora", including Bologna and Florence Battalions;
- 3rd Group (HQ Rome), subordinated to the 2nd Carabinieri Division "Podgora", including Battalions "Lazio", "Rome" and "Cagliari";
- 4th Group (HQ Naples), subordinated to the 3rd Carabinieri Division "Ogaden", with Naples, Bari and Palermo Battalions.

The Mobile Battalions were provided of new vehicles in order to enable them to deploy rapidly.

In the immediate aftermaths of World War II, both police and Carabinieri were strictly prohibited by armistice clauses to have hand grenades, machine guns, rifles and even handguns.^{pp. 63–64} Ferruccio Parri, Prime Minister in 1945, supported the reinforcement of the Carabinieri in order to enable them to counter threats to public order.^{p. 64,85} In 1945 Carabinieri sustained 29 casualties during public order services.^{p. 67}

In 1949 Minister of Interior Mario Scelba asked the General Command of the Carabinieri and Minister of Defence Randolfo Pacciardi to provide Carabinieri of batons and other riot-specific equipment. Both the General Command and the Defence Minister refused.^{pp. 144–146} According to Virgilio Ilari, as of 1949 the Carabinieri mobile forces consisted of 13 Battalions and 34 Trucked Units (Nuclei Autocarrati), with an updated equipment. On 6 August 1956, the blue beret was assigned to mobile units (Mobile Battalions and Trucked Units).

On 26 August 1949, the Banditry Repression Forces Command was established under Colonel Ugo Luca.^{p. 170} Between 1951 and 1963, a new Parachute Carabinieri Battalion was established.^{p. 183}

After the end of the Second World War, in Italy occurred several security crisis: banditry in Sicily and in Sardinia, and civil disturbances across the country.^{pp. 168–169} Such disturbances were politically motivated and, as such, differently reported.^{pp. 61–63}

In the aftermaths of World War II (between 1946 and 1948), Carabinieri managed to evade the majority of the riot control operations;^{p. 89,135} nonetheless, during riot control operations carried out from the end of the war to 1948, 101 Carabinieri died, while 757 others were wounded. According to Antonio Sannino, the fact that the Carabinieri remained hostile to Communists' approaches caused the British support to them.^{p. 86}

Between 1945 and 1948, Carabinieri underwent a massive rearmament in order to deal with institutional duties. In 1945 they had only 5 armoured vehicles and 79 trucks; in 1948 Carabinieri deployed 264 armoured vehicles and 1358 trucks.^{p. 407}

In 1945, each Battalion deployed 12 M15/42 tanks; in 1946 tanks were retired and replaced with Staghound armoured cars. In 1953 each Battalion received two Tank Platoons (8 tanks) with M3 Stuart light tanks, and as of 1958 each Battalion could deploy 8 M4 Sherman tanks and 13 Staghound armoured cars. As of 1962, each Battalion had 6 tanks and 5 light armoured cars.^{p. 117-118}

== 1963-2000: 11th Brigade ==
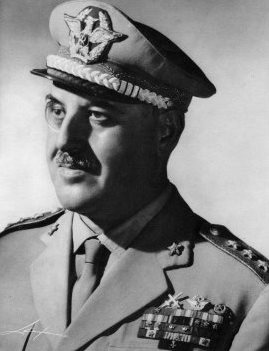
Lieutenant General Giovanni De Lorenzo established the XI Mechanized Brigade when he was Carabinieri Commandant-General.

The 11th Carabinieri Mechanized Brigade existed for a continued period of 37 years, and in 2001, with the transformation of the Carabinieri in an autonomous Armed Force, it evolved into the Carabinieri Mobile Units Division. During these years, the Brigade passed through the Cold War and the Years of Lead.

== Early proposals ==
Following the 1960 Genoa clashes, a reform project for the Mobile Battalions was envisioned, but later abandoned. Both the organization and the equipment (which included old Sherman tanks and trucked units) were found to be obsolete either inadequate to emergency tasks.^{p. 48}

On 27 January 1963, the Commandant General of the Carabinieri at the time, Lieutenant General Giovanni De Lorenzo, endorsed a proposal of then-Colonel Franco Picchiotti^{p. 107} in order to reorganize riot units. In this proposal, Mobile Battalions were to be available for both wartime and peacetime tasks, with a wartime organization and a reduced peacetime one.^{pp. 497–498}

=== Picchiotti-De Lorenzo proposal ===
The Picchiotti-De Lorenzo proposal called for Mobile Battalions to be available for both wartime and peacetime tasks. Such Mobile Battalions were to be equipped with all necessary capabilities in order to act when isolated and to overcome significant resistance without having to rely on other Italian Army or other Italian Armed Forces elements.^{p. 62}

Mobile Battalions as envisaged by the proposal had to maintain a significant concentration and movement rapidity and readiness and the organic equipment (both in terms of personnel and materials) to be ready to fulfil the wartime tasks.^{p. 63} Mobile Battalions also were to be with a wartime organization and a reduced peacetime one;^{pp. 497–498}

Mobile Battalions were therefore to be separated to the territorial Carabinieri Legions (regiment-level commands) and organizationally framed within three Carabinieri Regiments. Those Regiments were to have a distinctive operational structure with training, disciplinary and deployment functions, while administrative duties were to be discharged by the relevant territorial Legion.^{p. 63} In the proposal, only the VII and XIII Mobile Battalions were excluded by the grouping within the three Regiments; after the general elections (which De Lorenzo deemed to be imminent), the VII Carabinieri Mobile Battalion was to be disestablished and re-established in order to be subordinated to the IV Army Corps.^{p. 64}

Cavalry units were deemed to be too fragmented and therefore the proposal also suggested that mounted Carabinieri were to be concentrated in robust cavalry units,^{p. 498} by reducing Carabinieri stations manned by mounted Carabinieri to a maximum of 70, employing the new cavalry units en masse (both alone or alongside mechanized units). All cavalry forces were to be grouped within a dedicated Regiment with three Squadrons Groups (Battalion-sized cavalry units).^{p. 63-64}

== Establishment ==
On 29 March 1963 Minister of Defence Giulio Andreotti approved the proposal, and the following day the Army General Staff transmitted the authorization to the Carabinieri General Command.^{p. 64} On 1 April 1963, with the 1960s Army and Carabinieri reorganization, the XI Carabinieri Mechanized Brigade was established directly under the General Command led by Giovanni De Lorenzo, in order to cope with the internal territorial defence needs. The first commander of the XI Carabinieri Mechanized Brigade was Brigadier General Franco Picchiotti.^{p. 514}

The establishment of the new brigade was in order to adjust the organization of the Battalions and of cavalry units both for strictly military tasks, and those related to the protection of public order and riot control. The aim was to ensure Carabinieri Battalions the availability of all elements necessary to be in a position to act in isolation and overcome considerable resistance without having to rely on the competition of other Army Corps or other Armed Forces, to ensure Battalions' speed of movement and concentration in large sectors of foreseeable use and a constant high training level. On the other hand, the XI Carabinieri Mechanized Brigade had only support tasks, the Interior Ministry retained the power of deployment of Carabinieri Battalions through the General Command and the Brigade Command.^{p. 521}

The establishment of the XI Carabinieri Mechanized Brigade was controversial: some senior officers criticized the decision, deeming that the essential features of the Carabinieri were capillarity and focus on criminal police activity.^{p. 48} Ferruccio Parri deemed that the establishment of the XI Carabinieri Mechanized Brigade was purported to form an "Army within an Army", ready to intervene in the political balance.^{p. 492}

Overall, in 1963, the XI Carabinieri Mechanized Brigade consisted of about 5,000 men with 80 tracked vehicles, 200 other military vehicles (including M113 armored personnel carriers)^{p. 276}, 130 M47 Patton tanks and a paratroopers battalion. However, the brigade never had responsibility for actual unitary operational command, lacking supports due to a political choice, but exercised the tasks of instruction and preparation for the riot control activities.

In the 1963 reorganization, Mobile Battalions were renamed simply Battalions and were marked with a sequential number, while remaining administratively dependent on the relevant Legion; the Battalions Groups were renamed Carabinieri Regiments, and were given the conceptual role of a resolution unit in both riot and tactical tasks; In accordance with the Picchiotti-De Lorenzo proposal, Regiments had only disciplinary, training and deployment functions, while general management rested within the relevant Legion. The newly formed Mechanized Brigade exercised its operational and training authority on:

- 1st Carabinieri Regiment (HQ Milan): commanding I, II, III and IV Battalions;
- 2nd Carabinieri Regiment (HQ Rome): commanding V, VI, VIII and IX Battalions;
- 3rd Carabinieri Regiment (HQ Naples): commanding X, XI and XII Battalions;
- 4th Mounted Carabinieri Regiment (HQ Rome) with 2 Squadrons Groups (Battalion-level units) and 1 Armoured-motorized Squadron;
- VII Battalion (directly under the Brigade Command), under IV Army Corps; despite being the newest Battalion, the unit inherited traditions and number of the second battalion of Rome, which was disestablished.
- XIII Battalion (directly under the Brigade Command), under V Army Corps.

The command structure of the XI Carabinieri Mechanized Brigade consisted of:

- Staff, with personnel management and training bodies;
- Services Office, with activation and research tasks;
- Army officers of Transmissions and Motorization organizations, with management, technical, inspecting and consulting tasks.

=== Evolution ===
The 1963 reorganization did not mark the end of the organizational shifts. In 1964, 1st Carabinieri Helicopter Section was established.

Between 1973 and 1976, the 5th Carabinieri Regiment (HQ Mestre) also existed, including IV, VII and XIII Battalions. On 1 September 1977, 1st, 2nd and 3rd Carabinieri Regiments were disestablished and their Battalions were transferred under the direct operational and training authority of the 11th Mechanized Brigade; the 4th Mounted Carabinieri Regiment was renamed Mounted Carabinieri Regiment. In 1975 the XI Carabinieri Mechanized Brigade changed its name in 11th Carabinieri Mechanized Brigade (with Arabic numerals) and in 1976 the formation was renamed 11th Carabinieri Brigade; at the same time, the Brigade Command was tasked to exercise only training and logistical authority.

In 1977, the three Carabinieri Regiments were disestablished and 4th Carabinieri Cavalry Regiment changed its name in Carabinieri Cavalry Regiment, with the Battalions being directly under the Brigade Command. The following year an Inspecting Colonel was appointed, while in 1979 two additional Colonels followed.

With the end of the Cold War, the mobile organization lost its combat-oriented connotation, taking over the role of force mainly devoted to the performance of riot control. The 1st Carabinieri Group in Milan and the 2nd Carabinieri in Rome were established in the 1990s within the 11th Brigade; these units were renamed, in 1995, respectively Carabinieri Regiment in Milan and Carabinieri Regiment in Rome. In 1996, the 1st Carabinieri Battalion was transformed in the 1st Parachute Carabinieri Regiment "Tuscania", although it remained within Paratroopers Brigade Folgore until 2002.

=== Brigade subordination ===
From its establishment to October 1964, the XI Mechanized Brigade was directly subordinated to the General Command of the Carabinieri and under the IV Army Corps. In October 1964 the XI Mechanized Brigade was subordinated to an Inspector, ranking Divisional general.^{p. 232}

The XI Mechanized Brigade was subordinated, on 7 March 1965, to the Inspectorate of Mechanized and Special Units, which included not only the XI Mechanized Brigade, but also all other tactical Carabinieri units: the Carabinieri Paratroopers Battalion, the Territorial Squadrons Groups of Milan, Cagliari and Palermo, the Trucked Units, as well as the naval service. Two years later, on 10 March 1967, the post was modified in "Inspectorate of Mechanized Units", being disbanded in May 1967. In 1968 the blue beret was modified, making it identical in shape to the maroon beret used by paratroopers. Between 1967 and 1968 it was set up the Inspectorate of Mechanized and Training Units (led by a Divisional general), with responsibility on the X Carabinieri Brigade (including schools) and XI Carabinieri Mechanized Brigade. In 1971 it was established the Inspectorate Schools and Special Carabinieri Units; it controlled the X Brigade (dedicated to training) and XI Brigade.

On 22 September 1980, the Inspectorate changed its name to Carabinieri Division School and Special Carabinieri Units "Palidoro". In 1985, the Command was deprived of training component and was reorganized on the XI Brigade (Carabinieri Battalions) and the XII Brigade (specialist units); the brigade was therefore placed under a command called Carabinieri Mobile and Special Units Division "Palidoro".

== Carabinieri Battalion ==
The Carabinieri Battalion has been, since their initial establishment in 1919, the Carabinieri basic operational element for riot control operations. Carabinieri Battalions underwent several reorganizations.

The bulk of Carabinieri Battalions consisted (and had consisted until the suspension of the conscription in Italy) of Auxiliary Carabinieri, i.e. young conscripted soldiers. Rifle Companies all consisted of Auxiliary Carabinieri.^{p. 111} According to General Picchiotti, if necessary, each Battalion could become a full Regiment with a call to arms of retired Auxiliary Carabinieri.^{p. 114}

With the 1963 reorganization each Carabinieri Battalion was led by a Lieutenant colonel or a major and consisted of:.

- 1 Command Company (1 Command Platoon, 1 Services Platoon, 1 Scouts Platoon);
- 2 Rifle Companies (1 Command Platoon, 3 Rifle platoons, 1 Company weapons Platoon each);
- 1 Mortars Company;
- 1 Tanks Company (1 Command Platoon, 3 Tanks Platoons) It was therefore a robust tactical complex, designed to carry out both riot control and counter-insurgency operations.^{p. 107}

Notwithstanding the equipment upgrade requested by Lieutenant General De Lorenzo, vehicles remained an issue. While in theory all Rifle Companies should have been Mechanized Companies, only one Rifle Company in each Battalion was equipped with M-113 APCs, and the other one was equipped with Fiat Campagnola off-road vehicles.^{p. 116} Similarly, the full Tank Company (16 main battle tanks) was in force only at VII and XIII Battalions; the remaining unit had only a Tank Platoon.^{pp. 116–117}

The Carabinieri Battalions had to be used only when the police and the territorial organization of the Carabinieri had been found insufficient, in order not to deprive the General Command of a valuable combat tool; in ordinary circumstances, the Battalion units were to be deployed on foot, lightly armed, with the armoured personnel carriers used only for troops transportation.^{p. 108}

In 1969, under the command of former partisan Brigadier General Pietro Loretelli,^{p. 532} Battalions framed within Carabinieri Regiments were reorganized. The new structure consisted of:

- Battalion Command Unit;
- Command and Services Company (1 Command and Services Platoon, 1 Scouts Platoon, 1 Transmissions Platoon, 1 Tanks Platoon, 1 Transportations Platoon);
- 2 Mechanized Rifle Companies (1 Command and Services Platoon, 3 Rifle Platoons, 1 Mortars Platoon each).

According General Adamo Markert, as of 1969, the most prepared Carabinieri Battalions were headquartered in Gorizia, Bolzano, and Padua, ready for engagement in war.^{p. 519}

Between 1977 and 1978 all Carabinieri Battalions, with the exception of the 7th and 13th Carabinieri Battalions, were given the War Flag.

Overall, Carabinieri Battalions were divided into two groups, according to the main type (motorized or mechanized unit) of units deployed by the Battalion itself. Both VII and XIII Battalions were to be always maintained at their full wartime force. Within the VII Battalion, based in Laives, the Counter-terrorism Special Company was established in 1960s to counter South Tyrolean terrorism;^{p. 187} the security operations were also supported by several Trucked Units (which remained outside the Brigade).

== Operational history ==
During the Years of Lead and the subsequent period most of the Battalions reduced their military training in order to deal with riot control activities. 7th and 13th Battalions maintained instead their military capabilities and were transferred under direct Army operational control. Each infantry company of each Battalion established, in this period, an "Intervention Platoon", in order to upgrade the responsiveness to serious riots.^{p. 191}

The XI Brigade participated to the repression of South Tyrolean terrorism in 1960s;^{p. 187} according to General Giancarlo Giudici, in 1964 the Carabinieri deployed a Command Company, two Mechanized Companies, a Tanks Company, a Mortars Company and 850 troops with very poor training.

The 11th Carabinieri Brigade also intervened, through its subordinate units, in several natural disasters through the years. In the 1966 flood of the Arno, the XI Brigade provided 50 M-113 armoured vehicles and several tankers.^{p. 540} In the 1968 Belice earthquake, the XII Carabinieri Battalion "Sicilia", headquartered in Palermo, deployed its rescue unit and other troops, together with the IV Mounted Carabinieri Squadrons Group, under the leadership of the Carabinieri Legion of Palermo and under the guidance of the VI Carabinieri Brigade.^{pp. 549–551}

In the 1971 Lazio earthquake, the Rescue Unit of the VIII Carabinieri Battalion was deployed.^{p. 555} In the 1976 Friuli earthquake, the 13th Carabinieri Battalion "Friuli Venezia Giulia", 4th Carabinieri Battalion "Veneto" (75 troops, three Rescue Platoons, in the immediate aftermaths)^{p. 559} and 7th Carabinieri Battalion "Trentino Alto Adige" (31 troops, in the immediate aftermaths)^{p. 559} intervened paying rescue and providing police and utility services.^{pp. 203–204} In the immediate aftermaths, 93 vehicles of the Carabinieri Battalions were deployed.^{p. 562}

In the 1980 Irpinia earthquake, Carabinieri Battalions from Bari, Naples and Rome also intervened.^{pp. 203–204} In particular, in the early hours of the emergency the 11th Carabinieri Brigade deployed 1,500 troops and 180 vehicles, alongside several other Carabinieri assets.^{p. 53} Each of the rescue units provided from Carabinieri Battalions consisted of 120 troops with a field hospital, rescue vehicles and tools and field kitchens, as well as two physicians and paramedics.

The 11th Carabinieri Brigade was routinely employed against organized crime, especially in Calabria, Sicily and Sardinia. In 1988 additional reinforcements were deployed in Aspromonte, while in mid 1995 the Brigade provided reinforcements to the territorial police organization against the Sardinian banditry.

== Related voices ==
- Carabinieri
- Carabinieri Mobile Units Division
- 1st Carabinieri Mobile Brigade
- 2nd Carabinieri Mobile Brigade
- Military police
