= Alberico Albricci =

Italian general

Alberico Giuseppe Albricci
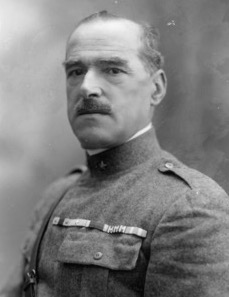
- General Alberico Albricci as Minister of War
- Allegiance: Italy
- Branch: Army
- Service years: 1886 – 1926
- Rank: Lieutenant General
- Commands: II Corp
- Conflicts: World War I Battle of Caporetto; Second Battle of the Marne; German spring offensive Hundred Days Offensive; Battle of Saint-Thierry

Alberico Albricci (6 December 1864 – 2 April 1936) was an Italian general who served in World War I, leading the 2nd Army Corps in France during the Second Battle of the Marne.

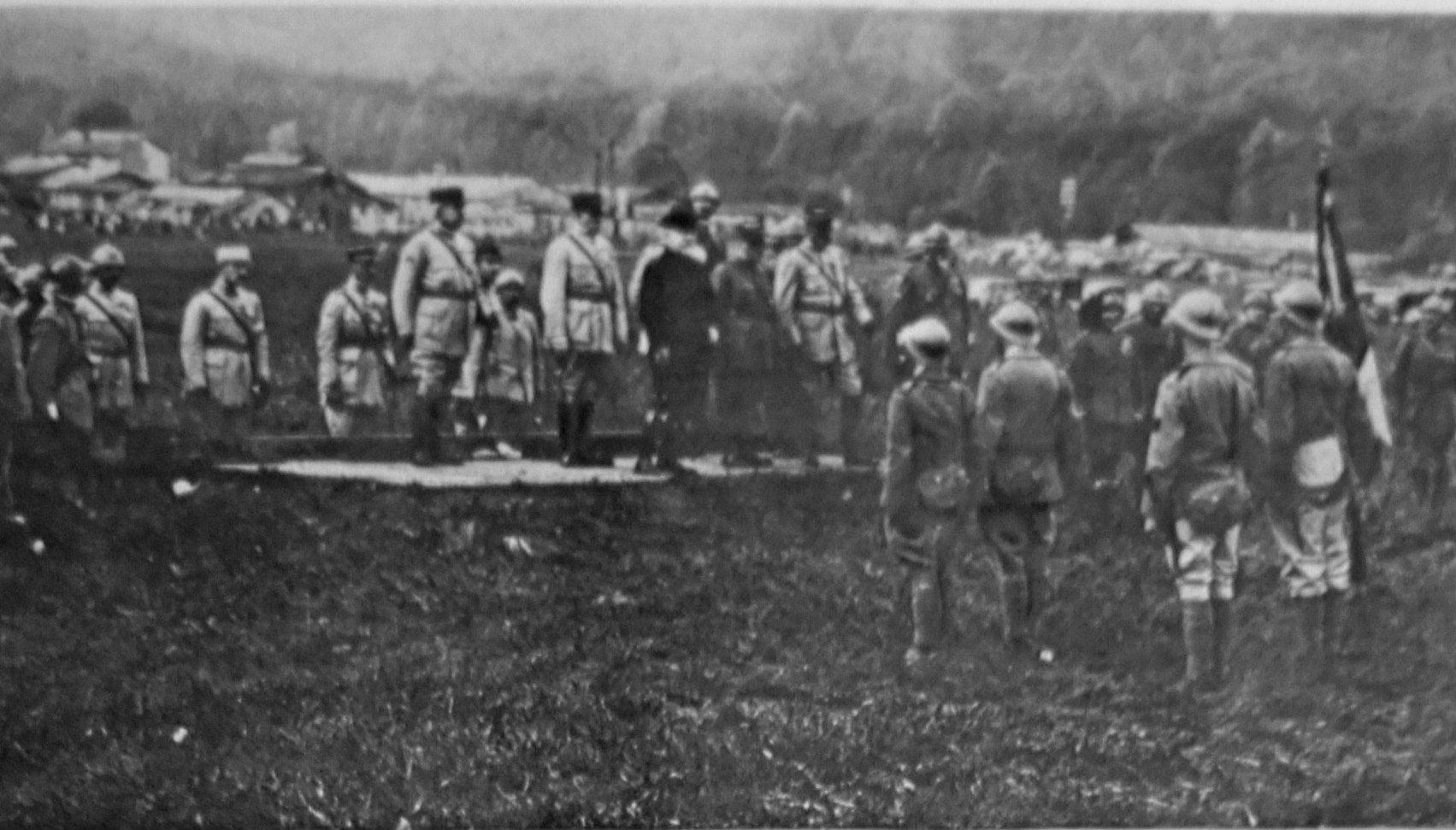
French president Poincaré in front of General Albricci during a parade by the Italian II Corp in France

Born in Gallarate, the son of a noble family, he graduated in his twenties from Modena Military Academy; he then served in Italian Eritrea from 1888 to 1889. In 1910 he was named Honorary Aide de Camp of the king and Military Attaché at the Italian Embassy in Vienna. When Italy joined the Allies in World War I, he held his post on the General Staff, but he was soon named commander of the Basilicata Infantry Brigade. Then he assumed his duty as chief of staff of the First Army. In 1917 he led the 5th Infantry Division in the Adamello massif. In late 1917, as commander of the 2nd Army Corps, he led the retreat of his troops from Gorizia to the bank of the Piave. In 1918 his corps was transferred to France. During the Second Battle of the Marne his corps suffered heavy losses in the zone of Bligny but was able to stop the advance of the Germans. In the following months, the 2nd Army Corps advanced and reached in November 1918 Sissonne and the river Serre. Albricci was named Minister of War in June 1919 and left the office in March 1920. He was named Senator of the Kingdom by the king. He died in 1936, at the age of 72.
