= Carabinieri Mobile Units Division =

Coordinates: 45.6887°N 12.2573°E

- Divisione Unità Mobili Carabinieri
- Emblem of the Carabinieri Mobile Units Division
- Active: 1 February 2001–present
- Country: Italy
- Branch: Carabinieri
- Type: Gendarmerie/Provost
- Role: Military tasks
- Size: Division; 6,500 troops (2004)
- Part of: Specialists and Mobile Units Command
- Garrison/HQ: Rome

Commanders
- Current commander: Gen. D. Aldo Iacobelli

The Carabinieri Mobile Units Division (Italian: Divisione Unità Mobili Carabinieri) is the Carabinieri formation, established in 2001, dedicated to the performance of military duties abroad, the military police tasks when abroad, the support to Territorial Organization, the participation in civil protection operations and to ensure the emergency reserve for the General Command.

== History ==
Carabinieri units devoted to the riot control and to tactical tasks experienced several organizational phases, from late 1910s to the present day. While from 1919 until 1963 Carabinieri riot units were under the exclusive control of Carabinieri Legions (inter-provincial commands), since 1963 they have been under an unified command: from 1963 to 2000 the Command was set at the Brigade level, while the present-day Division was established in 2001.

=== 1919-1923 ===
The history of the branch of the Carabinieri specifically dedicated to quell massive civil disturbances dates back in 1919, when 18 Carabinieri Autonomous Mobile Battalions (Battaglioni Mobili Autonomi) were established in order to deal with the Biennio Rosso.

Before 1919, the operational approach to riot control consisted in drawing Carabinieri from the territorial stations near the event, replacing them with Carabinieri drawn in turn from other Stations. Since 1908 several proposes had been made by Carabinieri officers to form organic Carabinieri units in order not to divert Carabinieri from the territorial police service and to improve the harmony within the ranks of Carabinieri assigned to public order services.^{pp. 271–273} the proposal was suspended due to the outbreak of the World War I.^{p. 14}

At the end of the World War I, the Royal Italian Army was reduced in size and both the Royal Carabinieri and the Royal Guard of Public Security were augmented.^{p. 268} Following the end of the War, participants to rallies increased in numbers and Army units deployed in internal order services significantly decreased. The Arm of Carabinieri, in order to sustain the increasingly heavy duty, established for the first time outside war several Army-style Battalions.^{pp. 269–270}

On 7 December 1918, the Carabinieri General Command elaborated a proposal for War Minister Alberico Albricci, assuming the establishment of 15^{p. 282} to 16^{p. 16} Mobile Battalions under the relevant Carabinieri Legion. The total strength of the Mobile Battalions was envisioned in 5,000 Carabinieri. According to the proposal, each Battalion should have had 5 trucks with attached drivers and mechanics, two motorcycles for commanders of the detachments and a light car for the commanding Colonel.^{pp. 280–282} Under the 1918 proposal, Legions with two Mobile Battalions assigned were to be led by a Brigadier General, with two Colonels, one of which assigned to the task of commanding the Battalioni Group.^{p. 16}

On 13 March 1919, the War Ministry ordered the provisional establishment of 16 Carabinieri Mobile Battalions, whose organization was to be dealt with by the General Command.^{p. 16} On 30 March 1919, Commandant General Luigi Cauvin issued executive orders for the establishment of the Mobile Battalions of the Royal Carabinieri. According to Article 3 of the executive orders, the Carabinieri Mobile Battalion was organized into:^{p. 17}

- Battalion HQ
- 3 Infantry Companies, (4 Platoons each)
- 1 Cyclists Companies (2 Platoons)

Each Mobile Battalion was to be led by a Lieutenant Colonel (Mobile Battalions of Alessandria, Genoa, Verona, Trieste, Treviso, Bologna, Ancona, Cagliari, Bari, two of the three Battalions of Rome, one of the two Battalions of Turin, Milan, Naples, Florence and Palermo)^{p. 19} or by a Major (Mobile Battalions of Udine, Taranto, Catania, one Mobile Battalion in Rome, Turin, Milan, Florence, Naples and Palermo),^{p. 19} assisted by an Aide ranking Lieutenant, each Company was to be led by a Captain, while Platoons could be led by a Lieutenant, a Second Lieutenant or by a senior Sub-Officer.^{p. 17} The strength of each Mobile Battalions was to be 782 officers and troops. According to Article 7, Carabinieri of the Mobile Battalions were to be deployed in organic units (Platoon, Company, or the whole Battalion) always under their own subofficers and officers. The training was specifically designed for public order and riot control services.^{pp. 284–286} One quarter of the strength of each battalion was to be assigned to the territorial support of the relevant Legion.^{p. 17} Battalions were to be housed in separate barracks from other Royal Carabinieri and, in case of more than one Battalion assigned to the same city, on the opposite side of the urban centre; at least one officer had to be housed in the barracks.^{p. 18}

After the widespread civil unrest of Spring-Summer 1919,^{p. 105} the Carabinieri accelerated on the establishment of the Mobile Battalions, despite personnel shortages.^{p. 106} On 25 August 1919, another study elaborated by the General Command proposed the establishment of Mobile Battalions as a quick reaction force, also in response to insurrections to be dealt with by the Army; the following day, a memorandum by the General Command advised against the establishment of the military Royal Guard of Public Security, a standing corps with military status dealing exclusively with civil disturbances.^{p. 107} The 1919 proposal envisioned therefore a mechanized unit consisting of Cyclist Companies, special trains (also available for natural disasters), and fast trucks; the training for personnel assigned to the Battalions was designed in order to improve the cohesion and decision.^{pp. 283–284}

The Royal Decree of 2 October 1919, no. 1802 sanctioned the existing situation, authorizing the raising of the Carabinieri Mobile Battalions.^{p. 21}

Pursuant the Royal Decree of 20 April 1920, no. 451, eighteen Autonomous Mobile Battalions were raised for a total strength of 12,282 Carabinieri.^{pp. 279–280} These carried the name of their garrison cities and were marked with serial number if more than one Battalion were assigned in the same city: Turin (2 Battalions), Alessandria, Genoa, Milan (2 Battalions), Verona, Florence, Bologna, Ancona, Rome (2 Battalions), Naples (2 Battalions), Bari, Palermo, Catania. The 1920 Battalions were organized into

- HQ and HQ Section
- 3 Carabinieri Companies;
- 1 Carabinieri Cyclist Company;
- 1 Machine-guns Section (2 Sections for seven Mobile Battalions: Torino 1°, Milano 1°, Firenze, Roma 1°, Roma 2°, Roma 3°, Palermo)^{p. 24}

Each Battalion had a total force of 750 men under the command of a lieutenant colonel.^{pp. 279–280} Mobile Battalions in Alessandria, Treviso, Cagliari, Catanzaro and Messina were established outside the 1918 plan, due to evolving needs.^{pp. 280–282}

Two years later, in 1922, six Battalions were disbanded and at the next year the remaining Battalions followed. However, three Battalions subordinated to the local Legion remained in existence: two in Rome and one in Palermo. In December 1922, the Royal Guard of Public Security (a military corps exclusively dedicated to riot control operations) was merged into the Carabinieri.^{p. 407}

==== Operations ====
The first period of existence of Mobile Battalions was short but intense. In 1919 the most serious disturbances occurred in Novara, Milan, Brescia, Rome, Piombino, Viareggio, Corenza and Venice, Apulia and Piedmont. The 1st Bersaglieri Regiment mutinied in Ancona in June 1920, but it was brought down by a Carabinieri Battalion. In 1921 serious disturbances erupted in several municipalities of Campania, including Castellamare di Stabia, in the major towns and cities of Tuscany, in Apulia, including Bari, and in Rome. In the same years, the Blackshirts movement clashed with leftist formations and strikes increased.

Between 1919 and 1920, the Carabinieri performed 233 public order and riot control operations and suffered 517 casualties (43 dead and 474 wounded). Facing increasingly combative demonstrations, the government authorities left loose rules of engagement to the police forces, with the result of bloody clashes.

According to Arnaldo Grilli and Antonio Picci, between 1919 and 1922, Carabinieri Mobile Battalions were awarded with 2 Gold Medals of Military Valour, 55 Silver Medals of Military Valour, 62 Bronze Medals of Military Valour, as well as hundreds of Solemn commendations.

=== 1940-1963 ===
In 1940, the new Army organization foresaw four Carabinieri Battalions, while in 1945 12 Battalions (renamed Mobile Battalions) were re-established, in order to deal with the civil unrest following the end of the civil war, along with four Mobile Battalion Groups (which were brigades). The 1945-established Mobile Battalions were equipped, supplied and maintained by the relevant Carabinieri Legion of their AOR. The Mobile Battalions Groups were:

- 1st Group (HQ Milan), subordinated to the 1st Carabinieri Division "Pastrengo" and including Battalions based in Turin, Milan, Genoa and Padua
- 2nd Group (HQ Florence), subordinated to the 2nd Carabinieri Division "Podgora", including Bologna and Florence Battalions
- 3rd Group (HQ Rome), subordinated to the 2nd Carabinieri Division "Podgora", including Battalions "Lazio", "Rome" and "Cagliari"
- 4th Group (HQ Naples), subordinated to the 3rd Carabinieri Division "Ogaden", with Naples, Bari and Palermo Battalions

Each group was organized into a brigade or regimental HQ with the battalions reporting to it.

The Mobile Battalions were provided of new vehicles in order to enable them to deploy rapidly.

In the immediate aftermaths of World War II, both police and Carabinieri were strictly prohibited by armistice clauses to have hand grenades, machine guns, rifles and even handguns.^{pp. 63–64} Ferruccio Parri, Prime Minister in 1945, supported the reinforcement of the Carabinieri in order to enable them to counter threats to public order.^{p. 64,85} In 1945 Carabinieri sustained 29 casualties during public order services.^{p. 67}

In 1949 Minister of Interior Mario Scelba asked the General Command of the Carabinieri and Minister of Defence Randolfo Pacciardi to provide Carabinieri with batons and other riot-specific equipment. Both the General Command and the Defence Minister refused.^{pp. 144–146} According to Virgilio Ilari, as of 1949 the Carabinieri mobile forces consisted of 13 Battalions and 34 Trucked Units (Nuclei Autocarrati), with an updated equipment. Trucked Units were part of Carabinieri Legions. On 6 August 1956, the blue beret was assigned to mobile units (both Mobile Battalions and Trucked Units).

On 26 August 1949, the Banditry Repression Forces Command was established under Colonel Ugo Luca in order to deal with banditry in Sicily.^{p. 170} Between 1951 and 1963, a new Parachute Carabinieri Battalion, dedicated to airborne operations in support of civil authorities in peacetime, was in active service^{p. 183}

After the end of the Second World War, in Italy occurred several security crisis: banditism in Sicily and in Sardinia, and civil disturbances across the country.^{pp. 168–169} Such disturbances were politically motivated and, as such, differently reported.^{pp. 61–63}

In the aftermaths of World War II (between 1946 and 1948), Carabinieri managed to evade the majority of the riot control operations;^{p. 89,135} nonetheless, during riot control operations carried out from the end of the war to 1948, 101 Carabinieri died, while 757 others were wounded. According to Antonio Sannino, the fact that the Carabinieri remained hostile to Communists' political approaches caused the British support to them.^{p. 86}

Between 1945 and 1948, Carabinieri underwent a massive rearmament in order to deal with institutional duties. In 1945 they had only 5 armoured vehicles and 79 trucks; the armoured fleet grew to 264 armoured vehicles and 1358 transport trucks in 1948.^{p. 521}

=== 1963-2000 ===
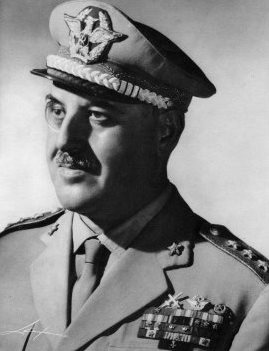
Lieutenant General Giovanni De Lorenzo established the XI Mechanized Brigade when he was Carabinieri Commandant-General.

Following the 1960 Genoa clashes, a reform project for the Mobile Battalions was envisioned, but later abandoned. Both the organization and the equipment (which included old Sherman tanks) were found to be obsolete either inadequate to emergency tasks.^{p. 48}

On 27 January 1963, Lieutenant General Giovanni De Lorenzo formulated a proposal to reorganize riot units. In this proposal, Mobile Battalions were to be available for both wartime and peacetime tasks, with a wartime organization and a reduced peacetime one;^{pp. 497–498} the proposal also suggested that mounted Carabinieri were to be concentrated in robust cavalry units.^{p. 498}

On 1 April 1963, with the 1960s Army and Carabinieri reorganization, the XI Carabinieri Mechanized Brigade was established directly under the General Command led by Giovanni De Lorenzo, in order to cope with the internal territorial defence needs. The first commander of the XI Carabinieri Mechanized Brigade was Brigadier General Franco Picchiotti.^{p. 514}

The establishment of the new brigade was in order to adjust the organization of the Battalions and of cavalry units both for strictly military tasks, and those related to the protection of public order and riot control. The aim was to ensure Carabinieri Battalions the availability of all elements necessary to be in a position to act in isolation and overcome considerable resistance without having to rely on the support of other Army Corps or even of other Armed Forces, to ensure Battalions' speed of movement and concentration in large sectors of foreseeable use and a constant high training level. On the other hand, the XI Carabinieri Mechanized Brigade had only support tasks, the Interior Ministry retained the power of deployment of Carabinieri Battalions through the General Command and the Brigade Command.^{p. 521}

The establishment of the XI Carabinieri Mechanized Brigade was controversial: some senior officers criticized the decision, deeming that the essential features of the Carabinieri were capillarity and focus on criminal police activity.^{p. 48} Ferruccio Parri deemed that the establishment of the XI Carabinieri Mechanized Brigade was purported to form an "Army within an Army", ready to intervene in the political balance.^{p. 492}

Overall, the XI Carabinieri Mechanized Brigade consisted of about 5,000 men with 80 tracked vehicles, 200 other military vehicles, 130 M47 tanks and a paratroopers battalion. However, the brigade never had responsibility for actual unitary operational command, lacking supports due to a political choice, but exercised the tasks of instruction and preparation for the riot control activities.

In the 1963 reorganization, Mobile Battalions were renamed simply Battalions and were identified with a sequential number, while remaining administratively dependent on the relevant Legion; the Battalions Groups were renamed Carabinieri Regiments, and were given the conceptual role of a resolution unit in both riot and tactical tasks; According original resolutions, Regiments were to have only disciplinary, training and deployment functions, while general management rested within the relevant Legion. The newly formed Mechanized Brigade exercised its operational and training authority on:

- 1st Carabinieri Regiment (HQ Milan): commanding I, II, III and IV Battalions;
- 2nd Carabinieri Regiment (HQ Rome): commanding V, VI, VIII and IX Battalions;
- 3rd Carabinieri Regiment (HQ Naples): commanding X, XI and XII Battalions;
- 4th Mounted Carabinieri Regiment (HQ Rome) with 2 Squadrons Groups (Battalion-level units) and 1 Armoured-motorized Squadron;
- VII Battalion (directly under the Brigade Command), under IV Army Corps; despite being the newest Battalion, the unit inherited traditions and number of the second battalion of Rome, which was disestablished.
- XIII Battalion (directly under the Brigade Command), under V Army Corps.

The command structure of the XI Carabinieri Mechanized Brigade consisted of:

- Staff, with personnel management and training bodies;
- Services Office, with activation and research tasks;
- Army officers of Transmissions and Motorization organizations, with management, technical, inspecting and consulting tasks.

Each Carabinieri Battalion was led by a lieutenant colonel or a major and consisted of:

- 1 Command Company (1 Command Platoon, 1 Services Platoon, 1 Scouts Platoon), 2 Rifle Companies (command platoon, 3 rifle platoons, 1 company weapons platoon each);
- 1 Mortars Company and 1 Tanks Company (Command Platoon, 3 Tanks Platoons).

It was therefore a robust tactical complex. The Carabinieri Battalions had to be used only when the police and the territorial organization of the Carabinieri they had found insufficient, in order not to deprive the General Command of a valuable combat tool. Within the VII Battalion, based in Laives, the Counter-terrorism Special Company was established in 1960s to counter South Tyrolean terrorism;^{p. 187} the security operations were also supported by several Trucked Units. Both VII and XIII Battalions were to be always maintained at their full wartime force.

The 1963 reorganization did not mark the end of the organizational shifts. In 1964, 1st Carabinieri Helicopter Section was established.

The XI Brigade was subordinated, on 7 March 1965, to the Inspectorate of Mechanized and Special Units, which included not only the XI Mechanized Brigade, but also all other tactical Carabinieri units: the Carabinieri Paratroopers Battalion, the Territorial Squadrons Groups of Milan, Cagliari and Palermo, the Trucked Units, as well as the naval service. Two years later, on 10 March 1967, the post was modified in "Inspectorate of Mechanized Units", being disbanded in May 1967. In 1968 the blue beret was modified, making it identical in shape to the maroon beret used by paratroopers. Between 1967 and 1968 it was set up the Inspectorate of Mechanized and Training Units (led by a Divisional general), with responsibility on the X Carabinieri Brigade (including schools) and XI Carabinieri Mechanized Brigade. In 1971 it was established the Inspectorate Schools and Special Carabinieri Units; it controlled the X Brigade (dedicated to training) and XI Brigade.

In 1969, under the command of former partisan Brigadier General Pietro Loretelli,^{p. 532} Battalions framed within Carabinieri Regiments were reorganized. The new structure consisted of Battalion Command Unit, Command and Services Company (Command and Services Platoon, Scouts Platoon, Transmissions Platoon, Tanks Platoon, Transportations Platoon), 2 Mechanized Rifle Companies (Command and Services Platoon, 3 Rifle Platoons, Mortars Platoons). According General Adamo Markert, as of 1969, the most prepared Carabinieri Battalions were headquartered in Gorizia, Bolzano, and Padua, ready for engagement in war.^{p. 519}

Between 1973 and 1976, the 5th Carabinieri Regiment (HQ Mestre) also existed, including IV, VII and XIII Battalions. On 1 September 1977, 1st, 2nd and 3rd Carabinieri Regiments were disestablished and their Battalions were transferred under the direct operational and training authority of the 11th Mechanized Brigade; the 4th Mounted Carabinieri Regiment was renamed Mounted Carabinieri Regiment. In 1975 the XI Carabinieri Mechanized Brigade changed its name in 11th Carabinieri Mechanized Brigade (with Arabic numerals) and in 1976 the formation was renamed 11th Carabinieri Brigade; at the same time, the Brigade Command was tasked to exercise only training and logistical authority.

In 1977, the three Carabinieri Regiments were disestablished and 4th Carabinieri Cavalry Regiment changed its name in Carabinieri Cavalry Regiment, with the Battalions being directly under the Brigade Command. The following year an Inspecting Colonel was appointed, while in 1979 two additional Colonels followed.

In 1980, the Inspectorate changed its name to Carabinieri Schools and Special Carabinieri Units Division "Palidoro". In 1985, the Command was deprived of training component and was reorganized on the XI Brigade (Carabinieri Battalions) and the XII Brigade (specialist units); the brigade was therefore placed under a command called Carabinieri Mobile and Special Units Division "Palidoro".

Overall, Carabinieri Battalions were divided into two groups, according to the main type (motorized or mechanized unit) of unit the unit deployed.

==== Operations ====
During the Years of Lead and the subsequent period, however, most of the Battalions reduced their military training in order to deal with riot control activities. 7th and 13th Battalions maintained instead their military capabilities and were transferred under direct Army operational control. Each infantry company of each Battalion established, in this period, an "Intervention Platoon", in order to upgrade the responsiveness to serious riots.^{p. 191}

In the 1976 Friuli earthquake, the XIII Carabinieri Battalion "Friuli Venezia Giulia", IV Carabinieri Battalion "Veneto" and VII Carabinieri Battalion "Trentino Alto Adige" intervened paying rescue and providing police and utility services. In the 1980 Irpinia earthquake Carabinieri Battalions from Bari, Naples and Rome also intervened.^{pp. 203–204} During the Years of Lead and the subsequent period, however, most of the Battalions reduced their military training in order to deal with riot control activities. 7th and 13th Battalions maintained instead their military capabilities and were transferred under direct Army operational control. Each infantry company of each Battalion established, in this period, an "Intervention Platoon", in order to upgrade the responsiveness to serious riots.^{p. 191}

In the 1976 Friuli earthquake, the XIII Carabinieri Battalion "Friuli Venezia Giulia", IV Carabinieri Battalion "Veneto" and VII Carabinieri Battalion "Trentino Alto Adige" intervened paying rescue and providing police and utility services. In the 1980 Irpinia earthquake Carabinieri Battalions from Bari, Naples and Rome also intervened.^{pp. 203–204}

With the end of the Cold War, the mobile organization lost its combat-oriented connotation, taking over the role of force mainly devoted to the performance of riot control. The 1st Carabinieri Group in Milan and the 2nd Carabinieri in Rome were established in the 1990s within the 11th Brigade; these units were renamed, in 1995, respectively Carabinieri Regiment in Milan and Carabinieri Regiment in Rome. In 1996, the 1st Carabinieri Battalion was transformed in the 1st Parachute Carabinieri Regiment "Tuscania", although it remained within Paratroopers Brigade Folgore until 2002.

=== 2001-present day ===
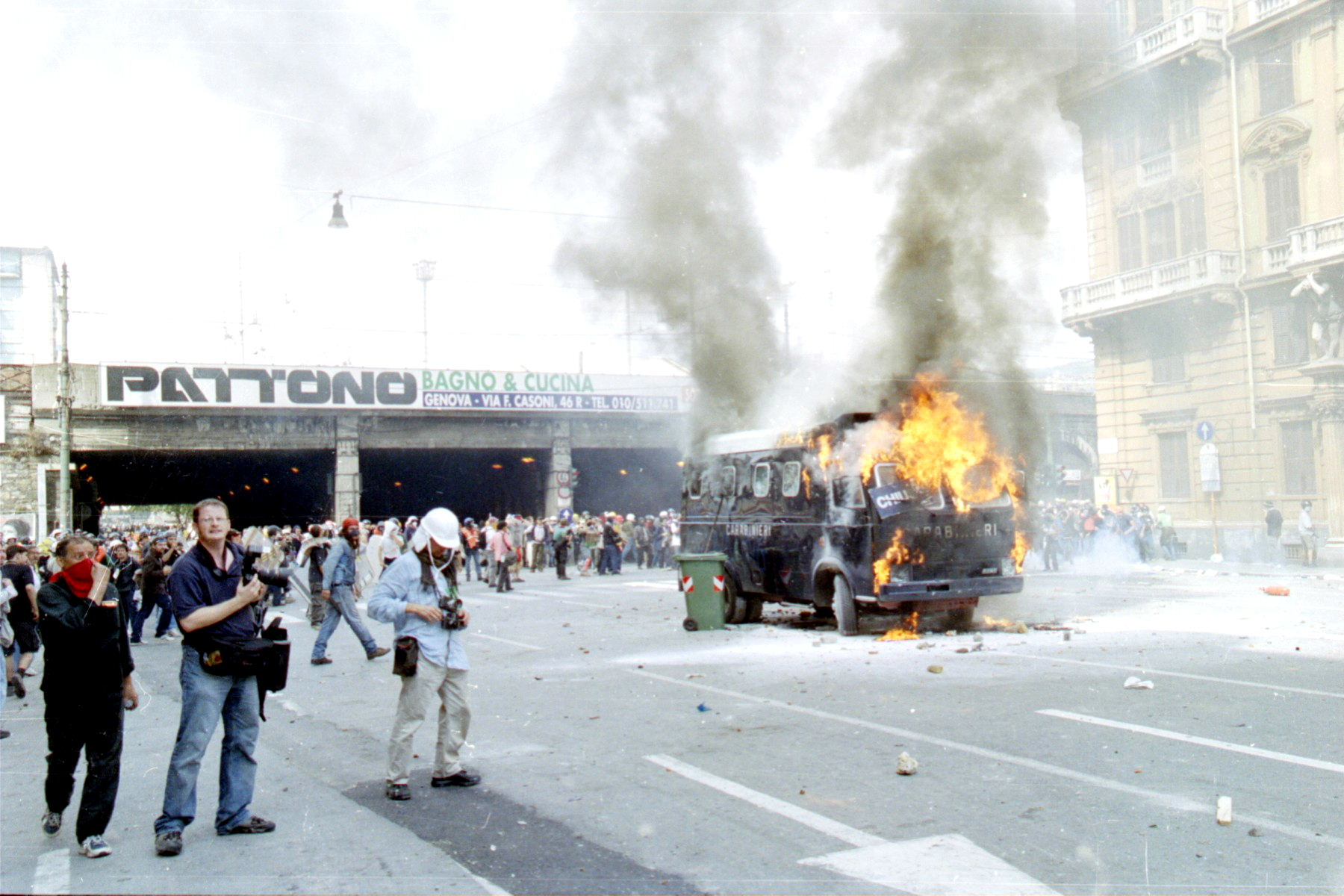
Protesters burn a Carabinieri vehicle during the 27th G8 summit.

In 2001, when the Carabinieri were elevated to the rank of autonomous Armed Force, the 11th Mechanized Brigade was reorganized into the present-day Carabinieri Mobile Units Division. From 2002 to 2013, the headquarters have been based in Treviso; in 2013 they were transferred in Rome.

During the first years of existence as Division, the strength was over 6,000 units: 6,712 troops as of 2002, 6,500 troops in 2004.

==== Operations ====
The first major engagement of the newly formed Brigade was the 27th G8 summit, a major protest, drawing an estimated 200,000 demonstrators. Clashed erupted heavily; 329 people were arrested and over 400 protesters and about 100 among security forces were injured during the clashes.

On the occasion, Carabinieri formed the shortly-existed Compagnie di contenimento e intervento risolutivo, units formed with personnel drawn from existing Battalions of the 1st Carabinieri Mobile Brigade (Battalions "Lombardia", "Lazio", "Toscana", "Campania" and "Sicilia"), integrated with personnel drawn from the more military-oriented 2nd Carabinieri Mobile Brigade. Critics of the CCIR frequently point out the militarization of police brought by the establishment of such units.

On July 20, 23-year-old activist Carlo Giuliani of Genoa, was shot dead by Mario Placanica, a Carabiniere, during clashes with police. On 14 July 2007, 13 Italian Carabineri, GOMPI Mobile and prison police were convicted for abuse of authority, abuse of office and uniform. Other charges included abuse and negligence.

== Division commanders ==
Since its establishment, the Carabinieri Mobile Units Division has been led by eight Major Generals:

- Gen. D. Luciano Gottardo (2001-2002);
- Gen. D. Michele Franzé (2005-2006);
- Gen. D. Giuseppe Barraco;
- Gen. D. Leonardo Leso (2007-2009);
- Gen. D. Umberto Pinotti (2009-2011);
- Gen. D. Vincenzo Coppola;
- Gen. D. Silvio Ghiselli;
- Gen. D. Maurizio Detalmo Mezzavilla (2016-2021);
- Gen. D. Giovanni Truglio (2021-2022).
- Gen. D. Aldo Iacobelli (2022-present)

== Mission ==
The Carabinieri Mobile Units Division, through its Brigades, is tasked with:

- The performance of military duties of the Carabinieri associated with the integrated defence of the national territory and participation in military operations abroad;
- The performance of military police tasks for the Italian Armed Forces deployed overseas;
- The support of the Carabinieri territorial organization in riot control activities and to increase the control of the territory in large urban areas and in the most sensitive areas in terms of public security;
- The participation in civil protection operations;
- To ensure the reserve of the General Command, a ready and reactive mass maneuvering force to cope with various emergencies.

=== Military operations abroad ===
Abroad, Carabinieri guarantee, exclusively, the Military Police in support of Italian contingents and provide MSU (Multinational Specialized Unit) and IPU (Integrated Police Unit) Regiments. The Division provide resources and personnel for several missions abroad. Current missions are carried out on behalf of the United Nations, NATO, European Union and on behalf of other international agreements.

UN missions

- Cyprus: United Nations Force in Cyprus (UNFICYP);
- Lebanon: United Nations Interim Force in Lebanon (UNIFIL).

NATO missions

- Afghanistan: NATO Training Mission - Afghanistan (NTM-A);
- Kosovo: Kosovo Force (KFOR).

EU missions Within the European Union, Carabinieri participate (through the Division) in:

- Somalia: European Union Training Mission Somalia (EUTM Somalia);
- Kosovo: European Union Rule of Law Mission (EULEX);
- Mali: European Union Capacity Building Mission (EUCAP Sahel);
- Mediterranean Area: European Union Naval Force Mediterranean (EUNAVFORMED)

Other missions:

- Israel: Temporary International Presence in Hebron (TIPH 2) and, in Palestine, Italian Training Mission (MIADIT)
- Lebanon: Italian Bilateral Military Mission in Lebanon (MIBIL)
- Iraq and Kuwait as part of the "Inherent Resolve";
- Libya: Operation "IPPOCRATE";
- Djibouti: Italian Training Mission (MIADIT Somalia).

== Organization ==
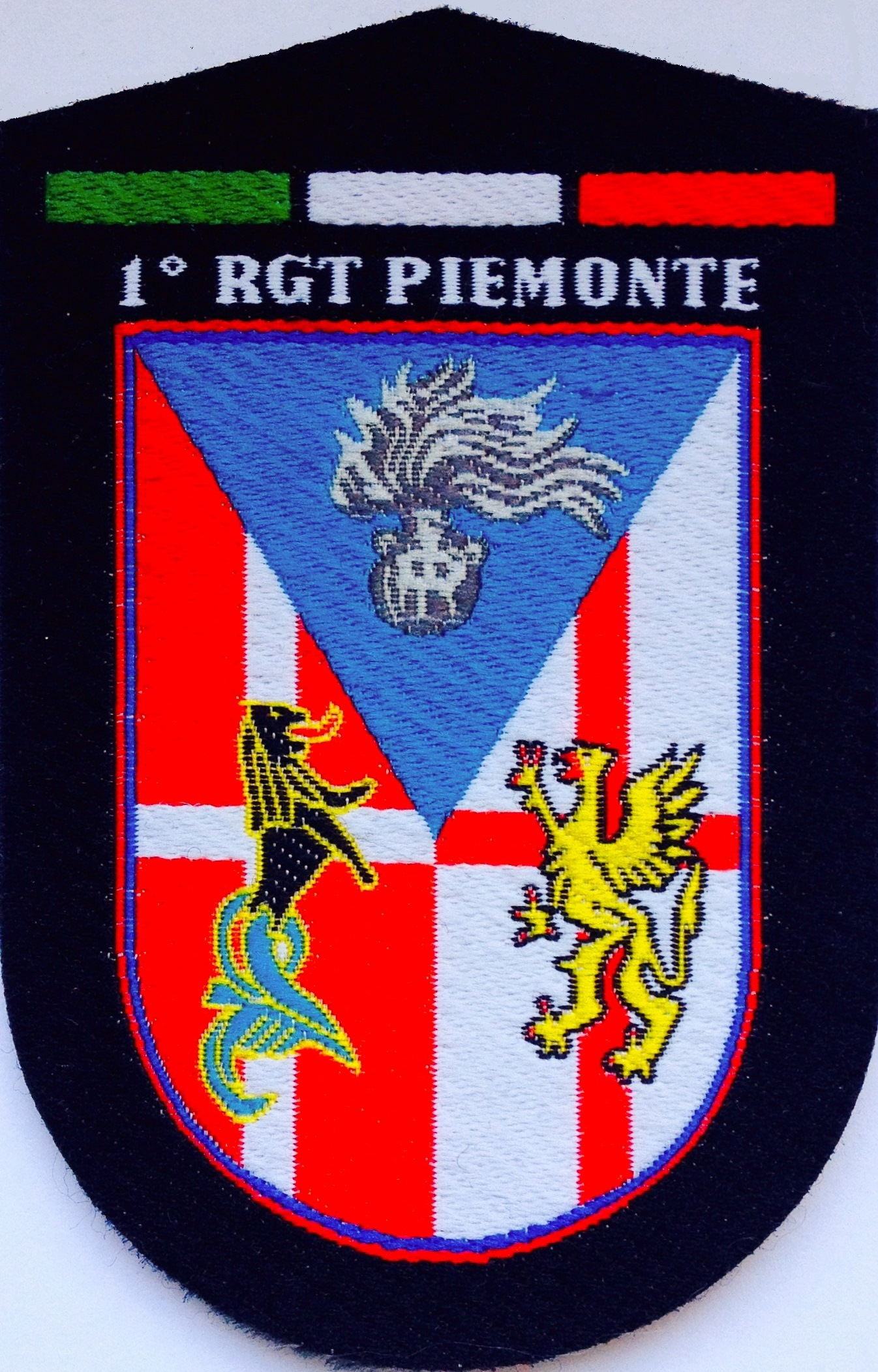
Emblem of the 1st Carabinieri Regiment "Piemonte"

The Division is placed under the Carabinieri Specialists and Mobile Units Command "Palidoro"; in turn, the Division is divided into two brigades.

=== 1st Mobile Brigade ===
The 1st Mobile Brigade, located in Rome, successor of the 11th Brigade; it employs the 1st Regiment "Piemonte", the 4th Mounted Carabinieri Regiment (based in Rome), the 5th Regiment "Emilia Romagna", the 8th Carabinieri Regiment "Lazio", the 10th Carabinieri Regiment "Campania" and 5 Carabinieri Battalions located in Milan, Mestre, Bari, Palermo and Vibo Valentia. The Brigade employs a total of 12 Carabinieri Battalions.

At the 8th Regiment Carabinieri "Lazio" in Rome and the Carabinieri Battalions in Milan, Florence, Naples, Bari, Palermo and Mestre it is constituted an "Operational Intervention Company" which, thanks to the special training of personnel and the allocation of substantial means and materials, allows to cope with the appropriate urgency in sudden danger to public security.

In addition, in order to deal with emergencies in case of public calamity, at the Battalions are set up, when needed, special Rescue Units previously trained and provided with equipment and materials which allow them to provide initial assistance to people affected while awaiting the intervention of civil protection.

The Carabinieri Cavalry Regiment contributes to the control of inaccessible rural areas of the country, supporting the territorial organization.

=== 2nd Mobile Brigade ===
The 2nd Carabinieri Mobile Brigade, based in Livorno, is dedicated to the military missions abroad, including the military police tasks. It employs the 7th Carabinieri Regiment "Trentino - Alto Adige", the 13th Carabinieri Regiment "Friuli Venezia Giulia", and the 1st Paratroopers Carabinieri Regiment "Tuscania" and the Special Intervention Group.

== Related voices ==
- Carabinieri
- 14th Carabinieri Battalion "Calabria"
- Military operations of the European Union
- Military police
- Riot control
- Mobile Unit (Italy)
