= John Hendrix =

John Hendrix may refer to:

- John W. Hendrix, United States Army general
- John Shannon Hendrix, architectural historian and philosopher
- John Hendrix (1865-1915), who allegedly foresaw the creations of the Manhattan Project and Oak Ridge, Tennessee, in a vision

== See also ==
- John Hendricks (disambiguation)
