= John Hendricks (disambiguation) =

John Hendricks may refer to:

- Jack Hendricks (1875–1943), American baseball player and manager
- John Hendricks (born 1952), American television executive
- John Hendricks (cricketer) (born 1956), South African cricketer
- John Allen Hendricks (born 1970), American academic
- John R. Hendricks (1929–2007), Canadian mathematician
- John Shannon Hendrix (born 1959), American architectural historian and philosopher
- John W. Hendrix (born 1942), American armed forces general and commander
- Johny Hendricks (born 1983), American wrestler and mixed martial artist
- Jon Hendricks (1921–2017), American jazz musician
- Jon Hendricks (artist) (born 1939), American activist, artist, and curator
- Jon Henricks (born 1935), Australian swimmer

== See also ==
- John Hendrix (disambiguation)
