= Operation Babylon =

Operation Babylon may refer to:

- An alternative name for Operation Opera, an Israeli bombing raid on Iraqi nuclear installations
- A 2015 Italian raid on a darknet market

== See also ==
- Operation Ancient Babylon (2003–2006), the code name given to the deployment of Italian forces during the Iraq War
