= Kosovo Campaign Medal =

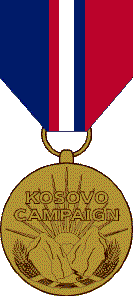
- Obverse
- Type: Military medal Campaign medal
- Presented by: the U.S. Department of Defense
- Eligibility: March 24, 1999 – December 31, 2013
- Reverse
- Status: Not currently awarded
- Established: Executive Order 13154, May 3, 2000. Amended by Executive Order 13286, February 28, 2003.
- First award: 2000 (retroactive to March 24, 1999)
- Final award: 2013
- Ribbon and streamer

Precedence
- Next (higher): Southwest Asia Service Medal
- Next (lower): Afghanistan Campaign Medal
- Related: NATO Medal for Kosovo and the NATO Medal Non-Article 5 medal for the Balkans

The Kosovo Campaign Medal (KCM) was a military award of the United States Armed Forces established by Executive Order 13154 of President Bill Clinton on May 3, 2000. The medal recognizes military service performed in Kosovo from March 24, 1999 through December 31, 2013.

== History ==
The following are authorized Kosovo Operations and task forces, with respective inclusive dates, eligible for the KCM:

Operation(s) / Task Force	From	To
ALLIED FORCE	24 March 1999	10 June 1999
NOBLE ANVIL	24 March 1999	20 June 1999
Task Force Saber	31 March 1999	8 July 1999
Task Force Hunter	1 April 1999	1 November 1999
SUSTAIN HOPE / SHINING HOPE	4 April 1999	10 July 1999
ALLIED HARBOUR	4 April 1999	1 September 1999
Task Force Hawk	5 April 1999	24 June 1999
JOINT GUARDIAN (note 1)	11 June 1999	31 December 2013
Task Force Falcon	11 June 1999	31 December 2013
Note 1: Effective January 1, 2014, award of the KCM for Operation JOINT; GUARDIAN transitioned to award of the Armed Forces Expeditionary Medal.

=== Kosovo Air Campaign ===
March 24, 1999 – June 10, 1999. The area of operations for this campaign included the total land area and air space of Yugoslavia (including Kosovo), Albania, Macedonia, Bosnia and Herzegovina, Croatia, Hungary, Romania, Greece, Bulgaria, Italy, and Slovenia; and the waters and air space of the Adriatic and Ionian Sea north of the 39th North Latitude. Note: Secretary of Defense William Cohen approved award of the Kosovo Campaign Medal to the following Navy vessels for participation in this campaign as an exception to the 30 consecutive day rule: "USS Norfolk; USS Miami, USS Boise; USS Albuquerque, USS Nicholson, USS Philippine Sea, USS Gonzalez and USS Theodore Roosevelt

=== Kosovo Defense Campaign ===
June 11, 1999 – 31 December 2013. The area of operations includes the total land area and air space of Serbia (including Kosovo), Montenegro, Albania, Macedonia, and the waters and air space of the Adriatic Sea within 12 nautical miles of the Montenegro, Albania, and Croatia coastlines south of 42 degrees and 52 minutes North Latitude.

== Criteria ==
Service members must be bona fide members of a unit participating in, or be engaged in direct support of, the operation for 30 consecutive days in the area of operations or for 60 non-consecutive days provided this support involves entering the area of operations or meets one of the following criteria:

- Be engaged in actual combat, or duty that is equally as hazardous as combat duty, during the operation with armed opposition, regardless of time in the area of operations;
- While participating in the operation, regardless of time, is wounded or injured and requires medical evacuation from the area of operations.
- While participating as a regularly assigned aircrew member flying sorties into, out of, within, or over the area of operations in direct support of the military operations.

== Campaign phases and devices ==
=== Kosovo Campaign Medal campaign periods ===
DoD consolidated campaign periods for all services
Name of campaign	Start date	End date
Kosovo Air Campaign	24 March 1999	10 June 1999
Kosovo Defense Campaign	11 June 1999	31 December 2013

Any one of the two campaigns

Both campaigns

Service stars are awarded for participation in either the Air Campaign or the Defense Campaign. Two service stars may be awarded provided that two separate tours, exceeding the 30/60 day requirement, were performed in both the Defense and Air Campaigns. The Kosovo Campaign Medal is always awarded with at least one service star. The Fleet Marine Force combat operation insignia is also authorized for certain sailors.

== Appearance ==
=== Obverse ===
In the center of a bronze medallion, two mountains with a pass between them rest in front of a fertile valley and atop a wreath composed of two stylized sheaves of wheat. Behind the mountains a rising sun, and superimposed over the sun's rays are the words, in two lines, KOSOVO CAMPAIGN. The stylized wreath of grain reflects the agricultural character of the area and its economy and symbolizes basic human rights while high-lighting the desire of all for peace, safety and prosperity. The rocky terrain, fertile valley, and mountain pass refer to the Dinartic Alps and the campaign's theater of operations. The sunrise denotes the dawning of a new age of unity and hope, the right to forge a future of freedom, progress, and harmony; thus fulfilling the goal of the Alliance.

=== Reverse ===
In the center of a bronze medallion, the outline of a map of the Yugoslavian Province of Kosovo. Beneath the map is a three-pointed star. In a circle surrounding the map and star are the words IN DEFENSE OF HUMANITY. The outline of the Province of Kosovo denotes the area of conflict, and is combined with the NATO star, the highlighted cardinal points of the compass, signifying the Alliance participants who stabilized the region and provided massive relief. The inscription reinforces the objective of the military action conducted during the campaign.

=== Ribbon ===
The ribbon consists of red, white, and blue pinstripes of equal width in the center; the ribbon to the wearer's right is dark blue and abuts to the red pinstripe; the ribbon to the wearer's left is red, and abuts to the blue pinstripe. The red, white, and blue were suggested by the NATO Alliance's colors, and the red, white, and blue pinstripes represent the colors of the United States flag.

== Notes ==
=== Combat Zones ===
Combat zones are designated by an Executive Order from the President as areas in which the U.S. Armed Forces are engaging or have engaged in combat. There are currently three such combat zones (including the airspace above each):Arabian Peninsula Areas, beginning Jan. 17, 1991—the Persian Gulf, Red Sea, Gulf of Oman, the part of the Arabian Sea north of 10° North latitude and west of 68° East longitude, the Gulf of Aden, and the countries of Bahrain, Iraq, Kuwait, Oman, Qatar, Saudi Arabia and the United Arab Emirates.

Kosovo area, beginning Mar. 24, 1999—Federal Republic of Yugoslavia (i.e. Serbia and Montenegro), Albania, the Adriatic Sea and the Ionian Sea north of the 39th Parallel.

Public Law 104-117 designates three parts of the former Yugoslavia as a Qualified Hazardous Duty Area, to be treated as if it were a combat zone, beginning Nov. 21, 1995—Bosnia and Herzegovina, Croatia, and Macedonia.

WASHINGTON, Sept. 24, 2013 – The Defense Department has announced the transition of the Kosovo Campaign Medal to the Armed Forces Expeditionary Medal, effective Jan. 1, 2014.

In a Sept. 19 memorandum, Acting Undersecretary of Defense for Personnel and Readiness Jessica L. Wright stated that the KCM recognized the significant contributions of U.S. military personnel in support of Operation Joint Guardian since 1999 as part of the NATO-led Kosovo Force. “The contributions of U.S. military personnel have been integral to ending open hostilities and to reducing ethnic tensions, allowing for the dramatic reduction of force levels over the past decade,” Wright noted.

As smaller contingencies of U.S. forces continue to support Operation Joint Guardian and NATO headquarters in Sarajevo, the AFEM will accordingly recognize that support of operations in the Balkans, the memo states.

The AFEM area of eligibility mirrors that of the KCM, Wright explained, with the addition of Bosnia-Herzegovina, Croatia and Hungary. The eligible area also encompasses Serbian land and airspace including Vojvodina, Montenegro, Albania, Macedonia, and U.S. Naval vessels operating in the Adriatic Sea. The Department of Defense Manual 1348.33, Volume 2, “Manual of Military Decorations and Awards” contains specific eligibility criteria.
