= Multinational Specialized Unit =

Italian Carabinieri unit

- Active: 1998-present
- Country: Italy
- Allegiance: NATO
- Branch: Carabinieri
- Type: Gendarmerie
- Role: Military missions abroad
- Size: Regiment various sizes
- Part of: Carabinieri Mobile Units Division; SFOR; KFOR; MNF-I
- Nickname: MSU
- Mottos: Una vis (One strength); Nei Secoli Fedele (Faithful throughout the centuries)
- Colors: Blue, red and black.
- March: La Fedelissima (The Ever Faithful) by Luigi Cirenei
- Anniversaries: 5 June, Carabinieri Day
- Military operations: Operation Joint Endeavour; Stabilisation Force in Bosnia and Herzegovina; Operation Allied Harbour; Operation Ancient Babylon; Operation Joint Guardian; Operation Joint Enterprise
- Website: Carabinieri.it

Commanders
- Commander of KFOR-MSU: Col. Gianfranco Di Fiore

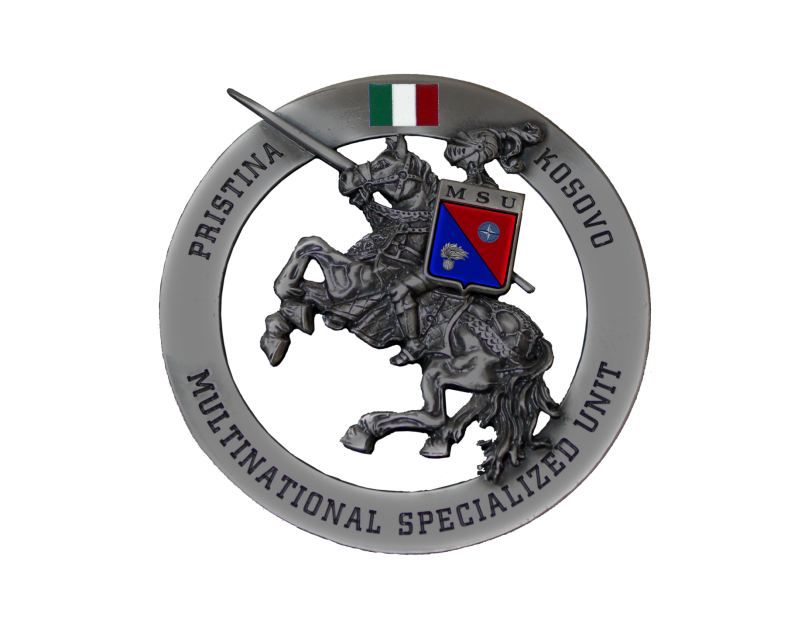
KFOR-MSU Logo, 2013.

The Multinational Specialized Unit (MSU), is a unit of the Italian Carabinieri, dedicated to the military missions abroad, including the military and civilian police tasks, peacekeeping operations, crowd and riot control.

After its creation in 1998, MSU units took part in many different NATO operations, in Albania, Kosovo, Bosnia Herzegovina and Iraq.

== History ==
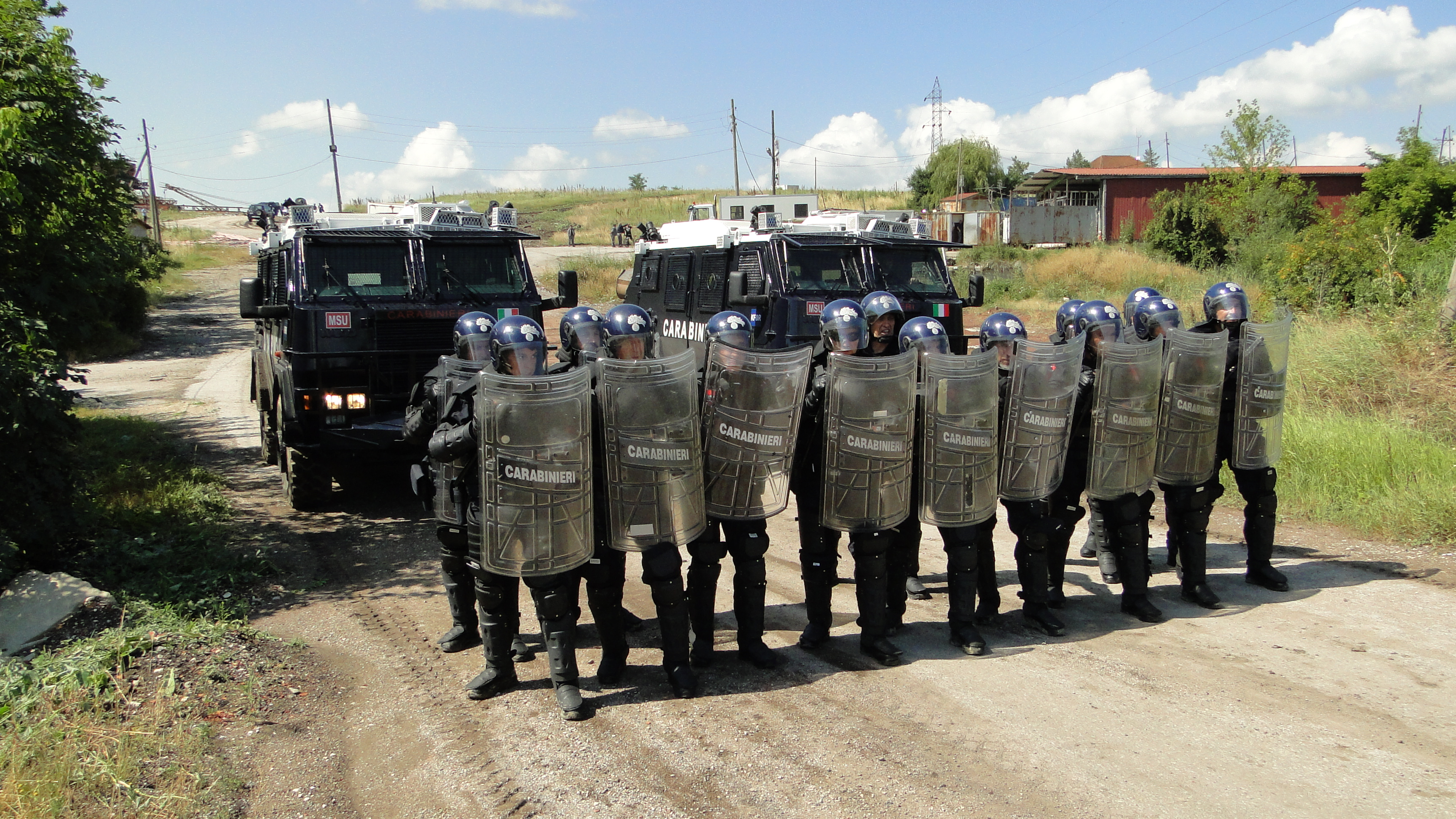
KFOR-MSU Carabinieri with two RG-12 during a crowd and riot control exercise in Kosovo.(2019).

Initially it has employed members of the 7th Carabinieri Regiment "Trentino-Alto Adige", the 13th Carabinieri Regiment "Friuli-Venezia Giulia" and the 1st Parachute Carabinieri Regiment "Tuscania". During the next years it has employed members from all over Italy, from every other Carabinieri units.

=== Bosnia and Herzegovina ===
The first mission where MSU was involved was the NATO-SFOR, in Bosnia and Herzegovina during the Yugoslav Wars. MSU was composed by Italian Carabinieri and members of the Romanian Military Police, among soldiers of Austria, Hungary and Slovenia.

=== Albania ===
After the tension in the Balkan area, during the Yugoslav Wars, in particular in the northern part of Kosovo a MSU detachment was deployed in Albania during Operation Allied Harbor, to aid the country in the refugees management. The mission was codenamed AFOR.

=== Iraq ===
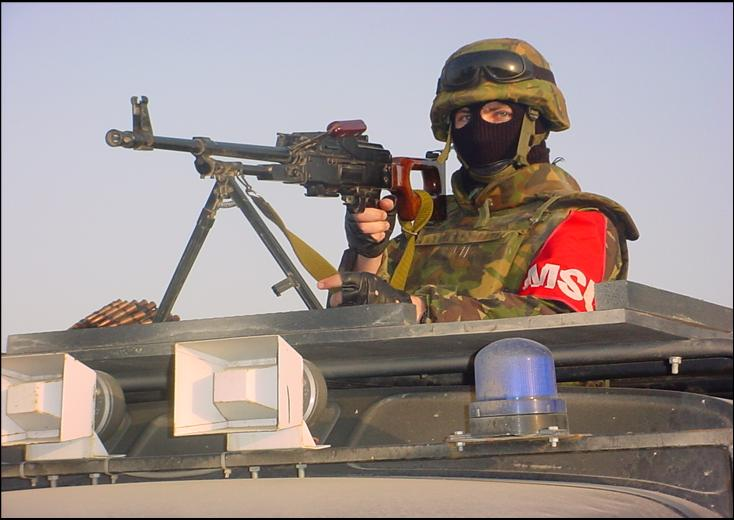
Romanian Military Policeman, member of MSU, in Iraq. (2003).

During the NATO Mission, inside the Multi-National Force – Iraq, MSU was deployed alongside other Italians units. The Italian Mission codename was Operation Ancient Babylon. MSU was composed by Italian Carabinieri, Italian Army liaison officers, members of Romanian Military Police and Portuguese National Republican Guard. During the mission MSU suffered heavy losses, in particular for the 2003 Nasiriyah bombing.

==== MSU-IRAQ Commanders ====
- Col. Georg Di Pauli (June–November 2003)
- Col. Carmelo Burgio (November 2003–March 2004)
- Col. Luciano Zubani (2004)
- Col. Claudio D'Angelo (2004)
- Col. Paolo Nardone (2004–2005)
- Col. Sebastiano Comitini (2005–2006)
- ...

=== Kosovo ===
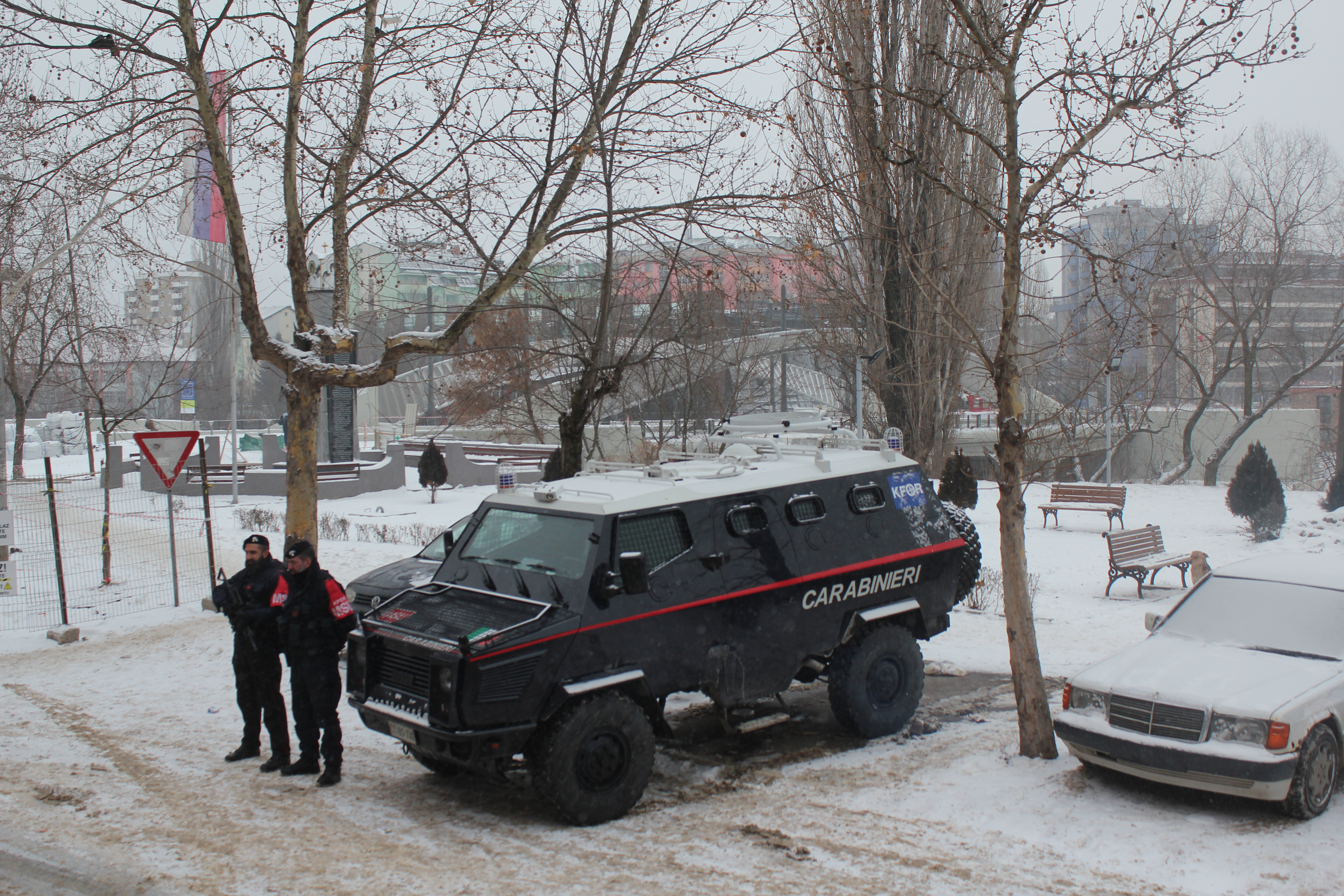
Carabinieri KFOR-MSU patrol in Mitrovica, Kosovo. (2018).

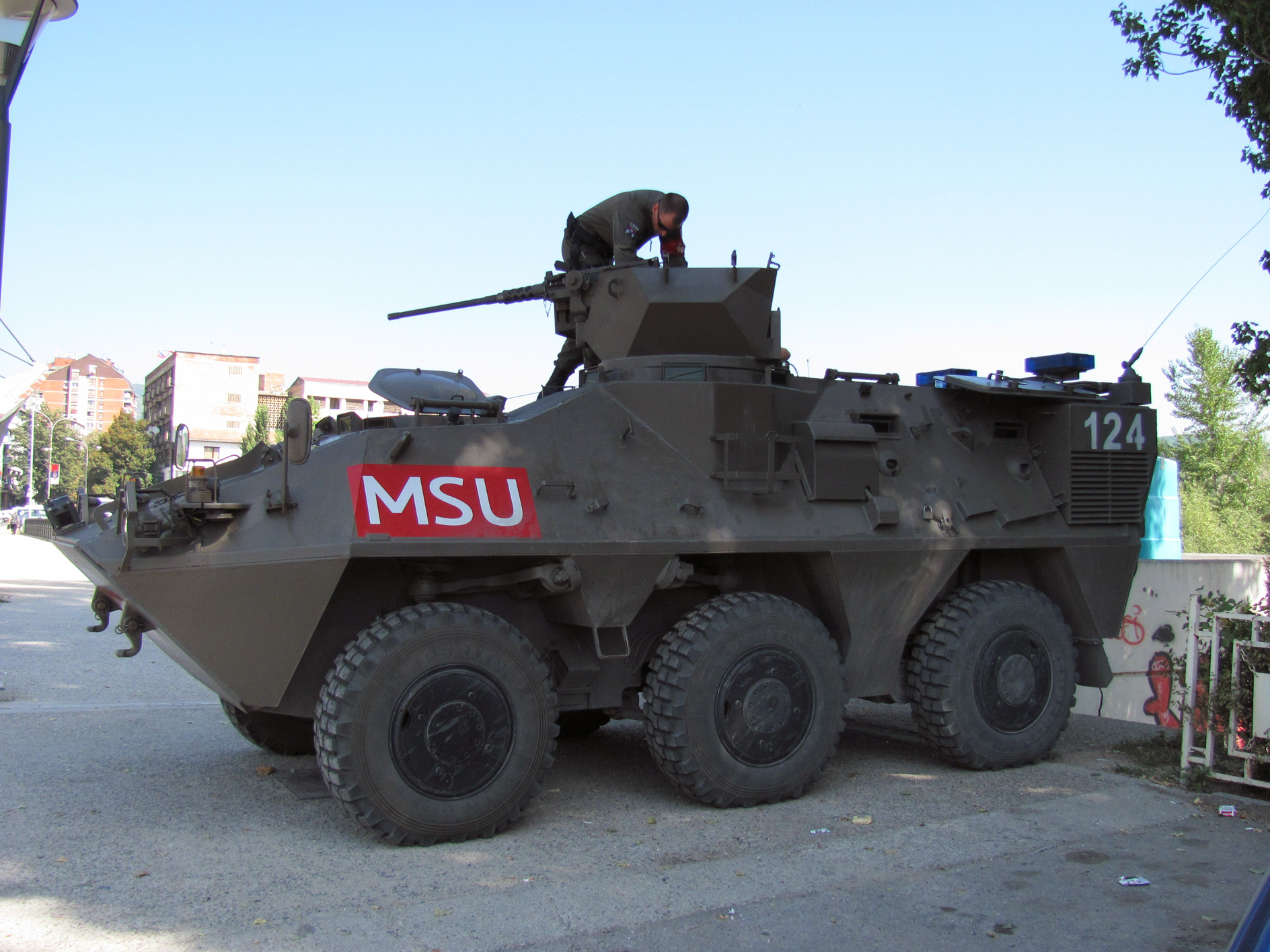
Austrian MSU Pandur I near the New Bridge, in Mitrovica, Kosovo. (2011).

Since 1999, after the United Nations Security Council Resolution 1244, MSU has been deployed into Kosovo for peacekeeping operations within NATO-KFOR. After years it's still present in the theatre, contributing to maintain peace and stability in the country.

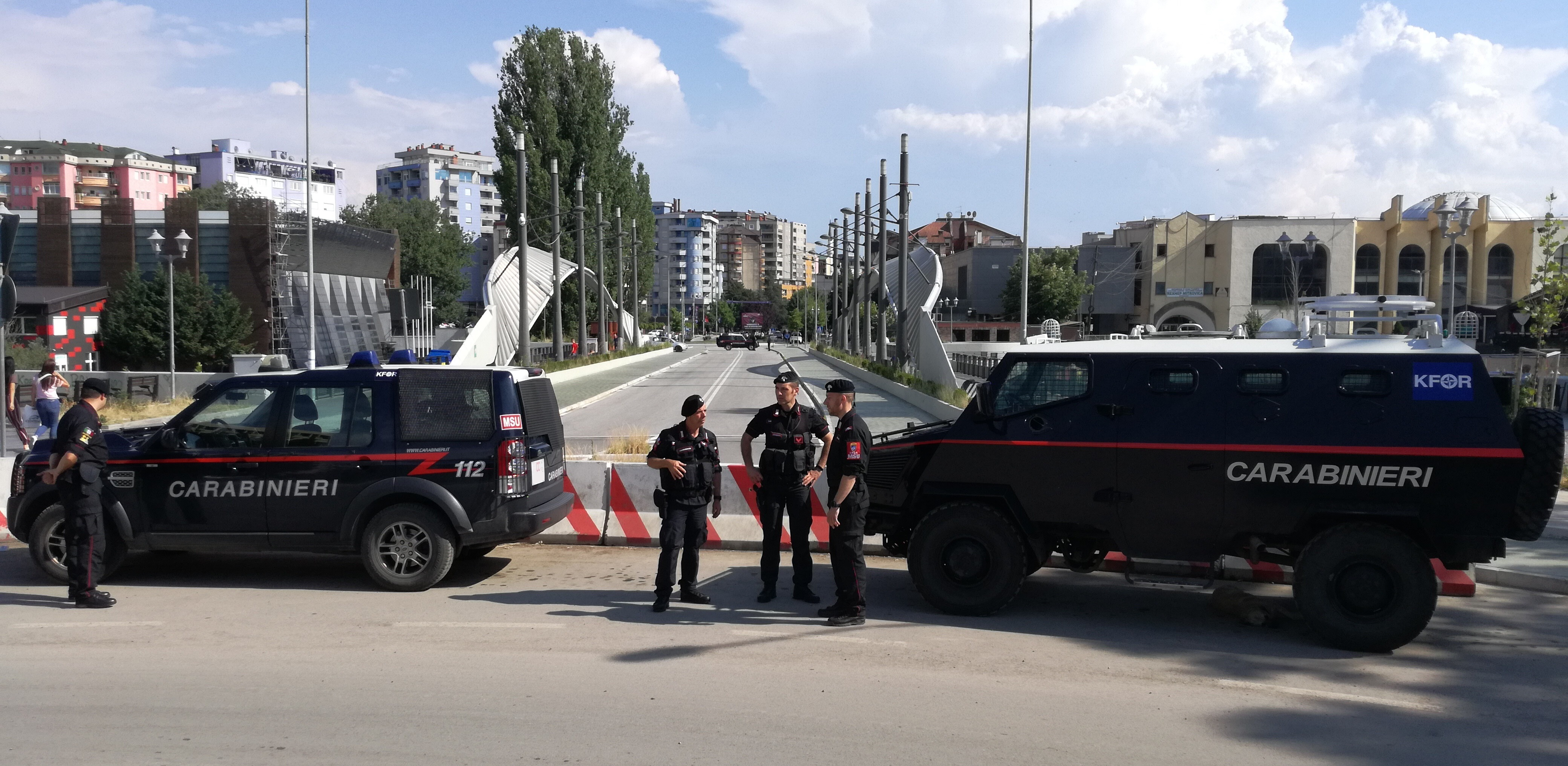
KFOR-MSU Carabinieri patrols, in front of the Ibar Bridge, in Mitrovica, Kosovo. (2019).

From 1999 to 2013 the French National Gendarmerie, Estonian Military Police and Austrian Military Police were also part of the MSU. Since 2013 it is composed entirely of the Italian Carabinieri and its main mission is to patrol the entire city of Mitrovica 24/7, in particular the New Bridge.

Since 2022 a unit of Army of the Czech Republic Military Police is part of the MSU regiment.

The KFOR-MSU Regiment is commanded by Italian Carabinieri Colonel Gianfranco Di Fiore

==== KFOR-MSU Commanders ====
Commanders list
Precedence	Commander	Portrait	Start of tenure	End of tenure
1	Col. Vincenzo Coppola, ITA		July 22, 1999	July 18, 2000
2	Col. Leonardo Leso, ITA		July 19, 2000	April 23, 2001
3	Col. Emanuele Garelli, ITA		April 24, 2001	May 3, 2002
4	Col. Georg Di Pauli, ITA		May 4, 2002	June 9, 2003
5	Col. Claudio Cordella, ITA		June 10, 2003	July 22, 2004
6	Col. Giuseppe Lanzillotti, ITA		July 23, 2004	July 28, 2005
7	Col. Flavio Garello, ITA		July 29, 2005	August 23, 2006
8	Col. Domenico Libertini, ITA		August 24, 2006	August 26, 2007
9	Col. Andrea Guglielmi, ITA		August 27, 2007	September 10, 2008
10	Col. Angelo De Quarto, ITA		September 11, 2008	September 8, 2009
11	Col. Gianni Massimo Cuneo, ITA		September 9, 2009	September 8, 2010
12	Col. Eduardo Russo, ITA		September 9, 2010	September 8, 2011
13	Col. Mauro Isidori, ITA		September 9, 2011	December 1, 2012
14	Col. Mario Di Iulio, ITA		December 2, 2012	December 7, 2013
15	Col. Gregorio De Marco, ITA		December 8, 2013	February 11, 2015
16	Col. Francesco Maria Chiaravallotti, ITA		February 12, 2015	October 13, 2015
17	Col. Paolo Coletta, ITA		October 14, 2015	October 13, 2016
18	Col. Fabio Cagnazzo, ITA		October 14, 2016	September 11, 2017
19	Col. Marco DI Stefano, ITA		September 12, 2017	September 14, 2018
20	Col. Ruggiero Capodivento, ITA		September 15, 2018	October 16, 2019
21	Col. Paolo Pelosi, ITA		October 17, 2019	...
22	Col. Enio Simone, ITA		...	...
23	Col. Stefano Fedele, ITA		February 02, 2021	January 27, 2022
24	Col. Maurizio Mele, ITA		January 28, 2022	January 26, 2023
25	Col. Massimo Cucchini, ITA		January 26, 2023	February 7, 2023
26	Gen. B. Ruggiero Capodivento, ITA		February 8, 2023	February 9, 2024
27	Col. Massimo Rosati, ITA		February 10, 2024	March 7, 2025
28	Col. Alberto Santini, ITA		March 8, 2025	January 13, 2026
29	Col. Gianfranco Di Fiore, ITA		January 14, 2026	present

Commanders list
Precedence	Commander	Portrait	Start of tenure	End of tenure
1	Col. Vincenzo Coppola, ITA		July 22, 1999	July 18, 2000
2	Col. Leonardo Leso, ITA		July 19, 2000	April 23, 2001
3	Col. Emanuele Garelli, ITA		April 24, 2001	May 3, 2002
4	Col. Georg Di Pauli, ITA		May 4, 2002	June 9, 2003
5	Col. Claudio Cordella, ITA		June 10, 2003	July 22, 2004
6	Col. Giuseppe Lanzillotti, ITA		July 23, 2004	July 28, 2005
7	Col. Flavio Garello, ITA		July 29, 2005	August 23, 2006
8	Col. Domenico Libertini, ITA		August 24, 2006	August 26, 2007
9	Col. Andrea Guglielmi, ITA		August 27, 2007	September 10, 2008
10	Col. Angelo De Quarto, ITA		September 11, 2008	September 8, 2009
11	Col. Gianni Massimo Cuneo, ITA		September 9, 2009	September 8, 2010
12	Col. Eduardo Russo, ITA		September 9, 2010	September 8, 2011
13	Col. Mauro Isidori, ITA		September 9, 2011	December 1, 2012
14	Col. Mario Di Iulio, ITA		December 2, 2012	December 7, 2013
15	Col. Gregorio De Marco, ITA		December 8, 2013	February 11, 2015
16	Col. Francesco Maria Chiaravallotti, ITA		February 12, 2015	October 13, 2015
17	Col. Paolo Coletta, ITA		October 14, 2015	October 13, 2016
18	Col. Fabio Cagnazzo, ITA		October 14, 2016	September 11, 2017
19	Col. Marco DI Stefano, ITA		September 12, 2017	September 14, 2018
20	Col. Ruggiero Capodivento, ITA		September 15, 2018	October 16, 2019
21	Col. Paolo Pelosi, ITA		October 17, 2019	...
22	Col. Enio Simone, ITA		...	...
23	Col. Stefano Fedele, ITA		February 02, 2021	January 27, 2022
24	Col. Maurizio Mele, ITA		January 28, 2022	January 26, 2023
25	Col. Massimo Cucchini, ITA		January 26, 2023	February 7, 2023
26	Gen. B. Ruggiero Capodivento, ITA		February 8, 2023	February 9, 2024
27	Col. Massimo Rosati, ITA		February 10, 2024	March 7, 2025
28	Col. Alberto Santini, ITA		March 8, 2025	January 13, 2026
29	Col. Gianfranco Di Fiore, ITA		January 14, 2026	present

==== KFOR-MSU Vehicles ====
- Land Rover Defender 90
- Land Rover Defender 110
- Land Rover Defender Ambulance
- Fiat Ducato Ambulance
- Land Rover Discovery series II and IV
- Mitsubishi Pajero
- Iveco ACM 80/90
- Iveco C-17
- Iveco Daily
- VM90P
- Iveco RG-12
- Iveco LMV

== See also ==
- Carabinieri
- Peacekeeping
- Carabinieri Mobile Units Division
- 1st Carabinieri Mobile Brigade
- 2nd Carabinieri Mobile Brigade
- Kosovo Force
- SFOR
- Operation Ancient Babylon
- 2003 Nasiriyah bombing
- Yugoslav Wars
