= Order of the "Adem Jashari" Freedom Fighter =

- Awarded for: State decoration given to citizens and foreigners who have shown bravery in the fight for freedom and independence.
- Country: Kosovo
- Presented by: President of Kosovo
- Ribbon
- Established: 2009

The Order of the "Adem Jashari" Freedom Fighter (Albanian: Urdhri Luftëtar i Lirisë "Adem Jashari") is a state decoration of the Republic of Kosovo. It is awarded by the President of Kosovo.

== Award ==
Order of the "Adem Jashari" Freedom Fighter is a state decoration given to citizens and foreigners who have shown bravery in the fight for freedom and independence, as well as for acts of freedom in peacetime. The award is named after Kosovo Liberation Army founder Adem Jashari.

It is awarded by the President of Kosovo, though the nomination might also come from: Chairman of the Assembly, Prime Minister, President of the Supreme Court and the Electoral College, Chief Prosecutor of Kosovo, Minister, Chief of General Staff, General Director of Police, President of the Municipal Assembly, and President of the Academy of Sciences and Arts.

== Recipients ==
Recipients include:

- Hakif Zejnullahu
- Edmond Hoxha

== See also ==
- Orders, decorations, and medals of Kosovo
