= Order of Freedom (Kosovo) =

Civil decoration of the Republic of Kosovo

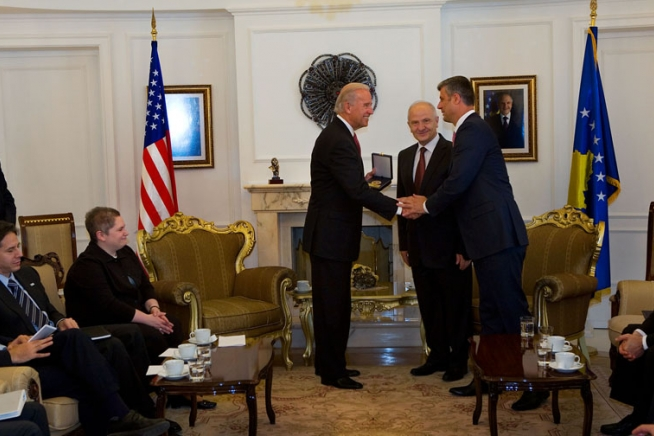
- Joe Biden receiving the medal in 2009
- Country: Kosovo
- Presented by: President of Kosovo
- Ribbon
- Established: 2009

The Order of Freedom (Albanian: Urdhri i Lirisë) is an award conferred by the Republic of Kosovo.

== Recipients ==
Notable recipients include then-current U.S. Vice President Joe Biden (2009), former prime minister of the United Kingdom Tony Blair (2016), U.S. Senator John McCain (2017), U.S. Air Force General David L. Goldfein (2017), President of Albania Bujar Nishani (2017), former French prime minister Alain Juppé (2018), former U.S. President Bill Clinton, (2019) and then-current U.S. President Donald Trump (2020).

== See also ==
- Orders, decorations, and medals of Kosovo
