= Task Force Hawk =

US military unit in the NATO's Operation Allied Force against the Yugoslav government

- Active: 5 April 1999–24 June 1999
- Country: United States
- Branch: United States Army
- Role: Deep strike
- Size: 5,100
- Equipment: Various: AH-64 Apache; UH-60 Black Hawk; OH-58 Kiowa; CH-47 Chinook; M270 MLRS; M109 howitzer; M102 howitzer; M1 Abrams; M2 Bradley; M1097 Avenger
- Engagements: Yugoslav Wars; Kosovo War; Operation Allied Force
- Decorations: Kosovo Campaign Medal; Air and Space Campaign Medal; NATO Medal

Commanders
- Task Force Hawk Commander: John W. Hendrix

Task Force Hawk was a United States military unit constructed and deployed by General Wesley Clark to provide additional support to NATO's Operation Allied Force against the Yugoslav government during the 1999 unrest in the Serbian autonomous region of Kosovo. The task force was to operate from March 1999 until June 1999 when Slobodan Milošević withdrew the Yugoslav Army from Kosovo.

Task Force Hawk, which never fired a round, has been hailed as both one of the largest blunders and largest successes by the U.S. military in recent years. This action has been reviewed and analyzed from every angle to determine what went right and what went wrong.

== Planning / pre-deployment ==
Planning for Task Force Hawk did not start until 20 March 1999 in Grafenwöhr, Germany; even though, the planning for Operation Allied Force had begun in the winter of 1998. General Clark and Admiral James O. Ellis, while at the Warfighter Exercise, discussed how to utilize the Apaches to augment the Air Force assets poised to strike in four days. The Army's planners would be strapped for time to put together a plan to deploy a mission that had never been employed by an AH-64 Apache unit. Instead of supporting ground troops the Apaches would be supporting Air Force missions. General Clark's vision for the unit was to destroy the Yugoslav units stationed in Kosovo supporting the Serbian police force. The Yugoslav units were not formed in the company or battalion sized formations but rather spread out through the countryside. This meant acquiring the targets and relaying the information to bomber units who couldn't spot them easily. It was projected that the Apache units would be able to identify and eliminate these targets more efficiently, due to their effectiveness in the first Gulf War. The Apaches would be supported by MLRS units conducting SEAD missions. General Clark's hope was that by eliminating a large enough portion of the Serbian forces would force the Yugoslav government to end the conflict. General Clark would face opposition to this opinion from several members of the Joint Chiefs of Staff.

By 22 March 1999, the planners would be finished with the initial plans for operation. These plans projected that the forces would be deployed to Macedonia, but the Macedonian government refused to allow offensive NATO operations to be launched from their country: "Army planners in Germany learned the mission would probably be cancelled on the Friday before Easter." Many soldiers would be given their first day off in weeks due to the Warfighter Exercise, hasty redeployment from Grafenwöhr, and preparations for deployment on Task Force Hawk; however, on 3 April, General Clark would decide to deploy the task force. It was announced on 4 April 1999 by the Department of Defense that Task Force Hawk would be deployed to Albania to assist in Operation Allied Force. The original size of the task force was estimated at 2000 but had to be increased due to the lack of force protection that was present in Albania.

== Deployment ==
Many units would begin the movement to Ramstein Air Base in Ramstein-Miesenbach, Germany, the main departure point as many of the units were part of V Corps. The airlift was directed by the U.S. Air Force's Air Mobility Operations Control Center (AMOCC) at the Ramstein Air Base, who was also coordinating the relief effect flights to Rinas. The Air Force would utilize the C-17 Globemaster III instead of C-5 Galaxy to deploy the Task Force to Tirana's Rinas Mother Teresa Airport airfield due to the runway length, taxiway, and ramp requirements. The short runway length would not be the only challenge for the deployment at Rinas. Operation Shining Hope was also utilizing the airfield to spearhead the humanitarian effects for the refugees of the war. The limited number of runways would only allow 20 sorties to be flown in the base per day. It would take 200 sorties to deploy full complement of equipment. Despite this being the first time that the United States Transportation Command "gave a theater tactical control of a significant number of strategic airlift aircraft for a specific deployment, General Montegomery C. Meigs later called one of the most successful airlift operations in history."

The Apaches self deployed from Illesheim, Germany in support of Task Force Hawk. The route taken was dictated by the fact that Austria and Switzerland would not allow use of their airspace due to the aircraft deploying to an armed conflict. The aircraft had to circumnavigate those two countries by first flying west into France around the western end of the Alps. From the southeast corner of France the flight turned south towards the Mediterranean Sea to follow the coast into northwest Italy where the aircraft and crews were made to wait for several days until the assembly area at Tirana airport was prepared for their arrival. (The ground was very soft and became quite muddy when driven over by army vehicles. The assembly area was not on a hard surface, positioned immediately west of the runway in the grass. The aircraft would have sunk up to their bellys if perforated steel planking had not been laid down. A mile long wood sidewalk had to be constructed to allow the flight and maintenance crews to walk from the assembly area to the aircraft parking area without sinking in the mud.)

Once the assembly area was built up enough to support the aircraft, the crews were given the go-ahead to continue south, down and across the Italian peninsula to the Brindisi airport where the aircraft were armed, and provisions made for the crews, for the 90-nautical-mile (170 km) flight over the open water of the Adriatic sea to Tirana.

Soldiers from the Task Force were also tasked with providing base security, establishing two Forward Operating Bases. The FOB's were staging areas for MLRS systems that would be used in support of the air operations. One Company from 1st Battalion, 6th Infantry Regiment (Mechanized), would rotate to the FOB every two weeks.

=== Units deployed ===
Spurce:

- Task Force Command Group (V Corps Headquarters)
  - V Corps Artillery Headquarters
    - U.S. 41st Field Artillery Brigade – Headquarters
      - 1st Battalion, 27th Field Artillery (MLRS)
      - A Battery, 2nd Battalion, 18th Field Artillery, 212th Brigade (MLRS)
  - 12th Aviation Brigade
    - 11th Attack Helicopter Regiment (Two squadrons of Apache pilots, one squadron of AH-64A Apache Attack Helicopters)
    - F Company, 159th Aviation Regiment, Big Windy (minus) CH-47D Chinook helicopters and aviation maintenance/support
    - 5th Battalion, 158th Aviation Regiment (minus) - UH-60 Black Hawk helicopters and aviation maintenance/support
    - 4th Air Support Operations Squadron - Air Force Liaison Element to V Corps
    - A Company, 3rd Battalion, 58th Aviation Regiment - Air Traffic Services personnel
  - 2d Brigade Combat Team, 1st Armored Division
    - C Company, 47th Forward Support Battalion (FSB)
    - 1st Battalion, 6th Infantry Regiment (Mechanized)
    - C Company, 1st Battalion, 35th Armored Regiment
    - A Battery, 4th Battalion, 27th Field Artillery Regiment, (M109A6)
    - Field Artillery Target Acquisition Section, 4th Battalion, 27th Field Artillery Regiment,
    - 2nd Platoon, B Battery, 1st Battalion, 4th Air Defense Artillery Regiment (M2A2 Bradley)
    - D Battery, 1st Battalion, 4th Air Defense Artillery Regiment (Avenger)
    - 2nd Battalion, 505th Parachute Infantry Regiment, augmented by:
      - A and C Company, 2nd Battalion, 14th Infantry Regiment
      - C Battery, 1st Battalion, 319th Field Artillery, (M119)
      - 2nd Platoon, C Company, 307th Engineer Battalion, 82nd Airborne Division
  - V Corps Support Group
    - 32nd Signal Battalion (MSE)
      - HQs
      - A Company (Node Center 2)
      - C Company
      - D Company (Long Haul Platoons)
    - 615th Military Police Company
    - 3rd Platoon, 212th Military Police Company
  - Psychological Operations Detachment
  - Special Operations Command and Control Element

  1st Combat Camera Sq.- Charleston AFB SC
  515th Transportation Company

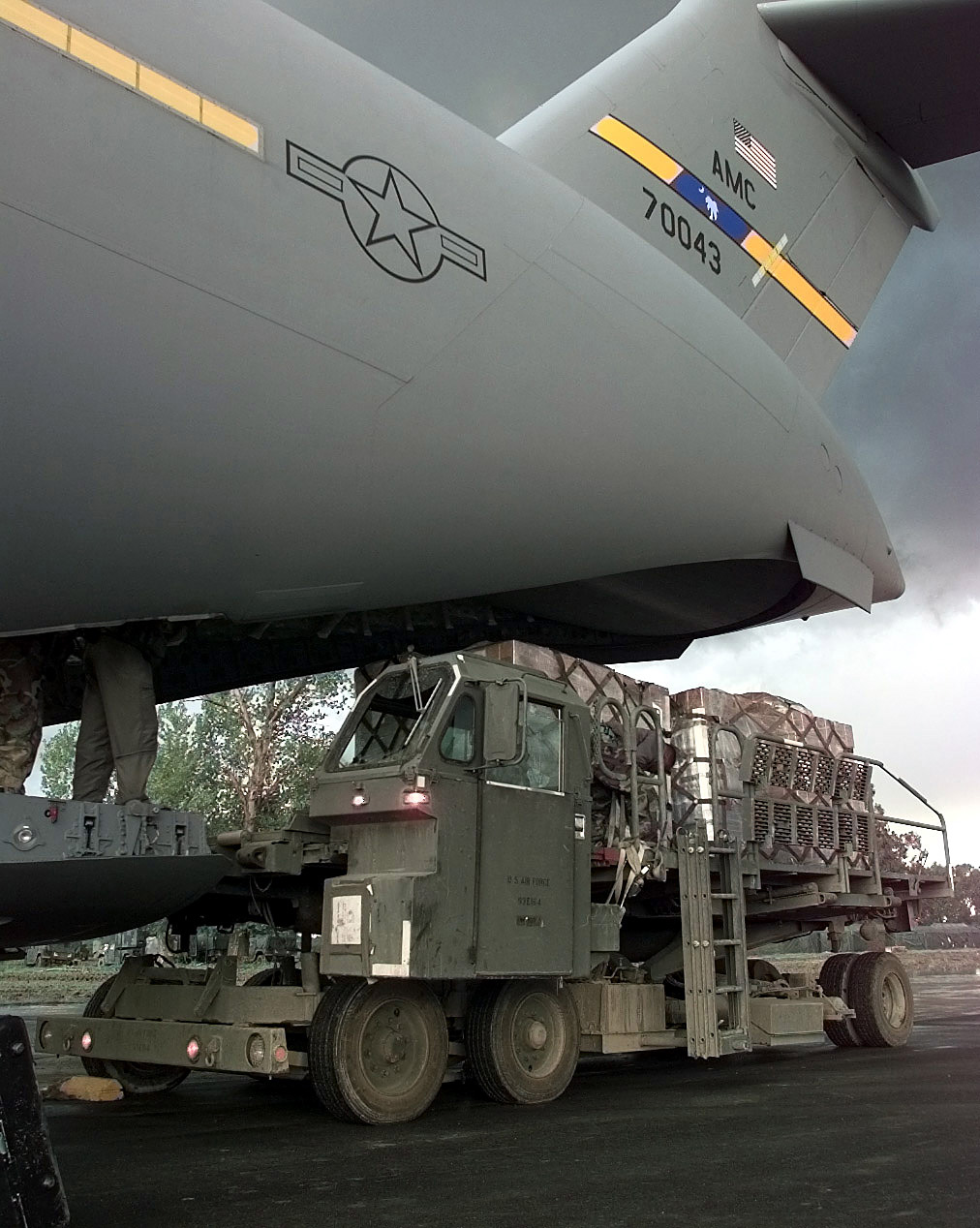
A C-17 Globemaster III offloads equipment at Rinas Airport, Tirana, Albania on 18 April 1999.

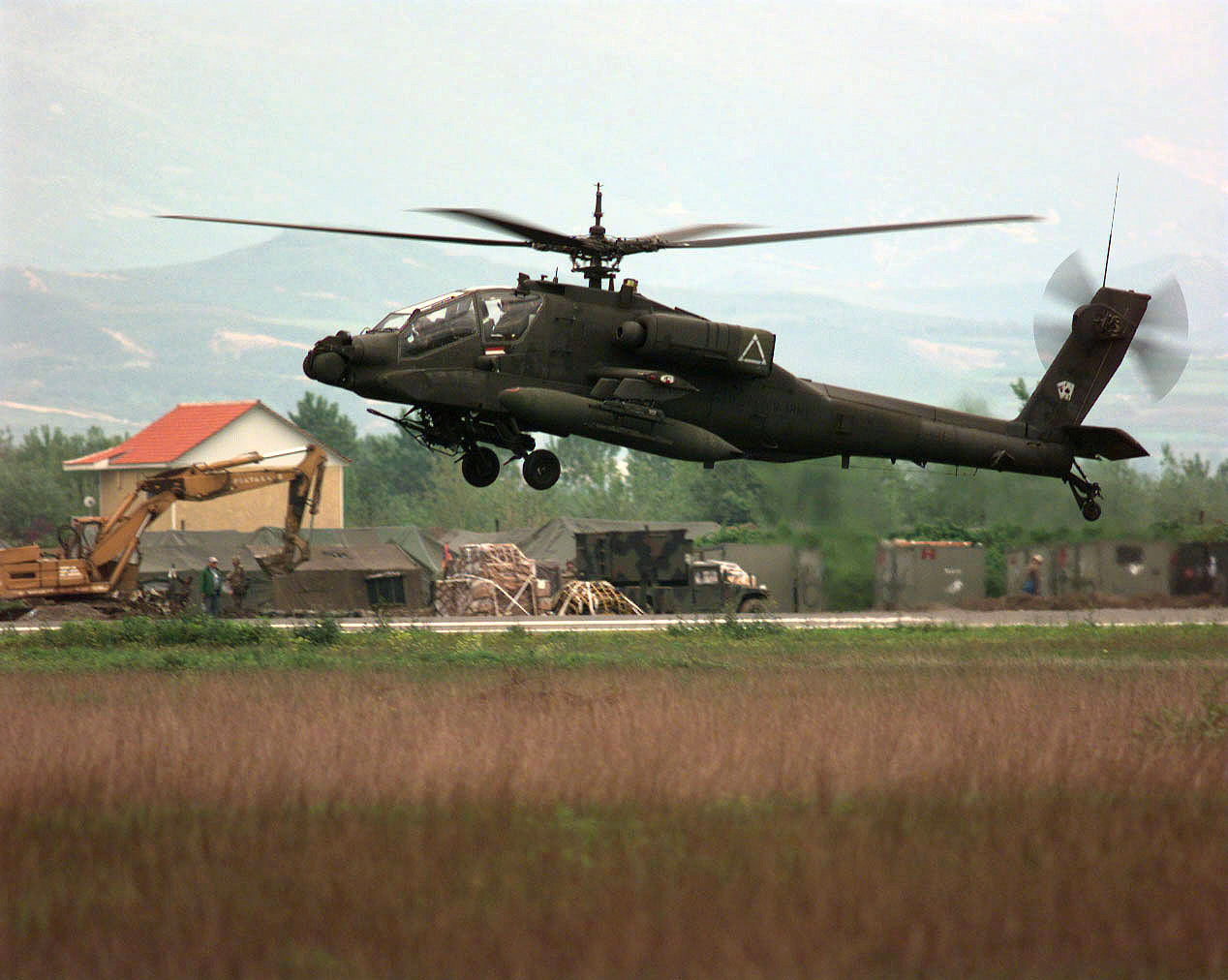
An AH-64A Apache attack helicopter from Task Force Hawk landing at Rinas Airport on 21 April 1999.

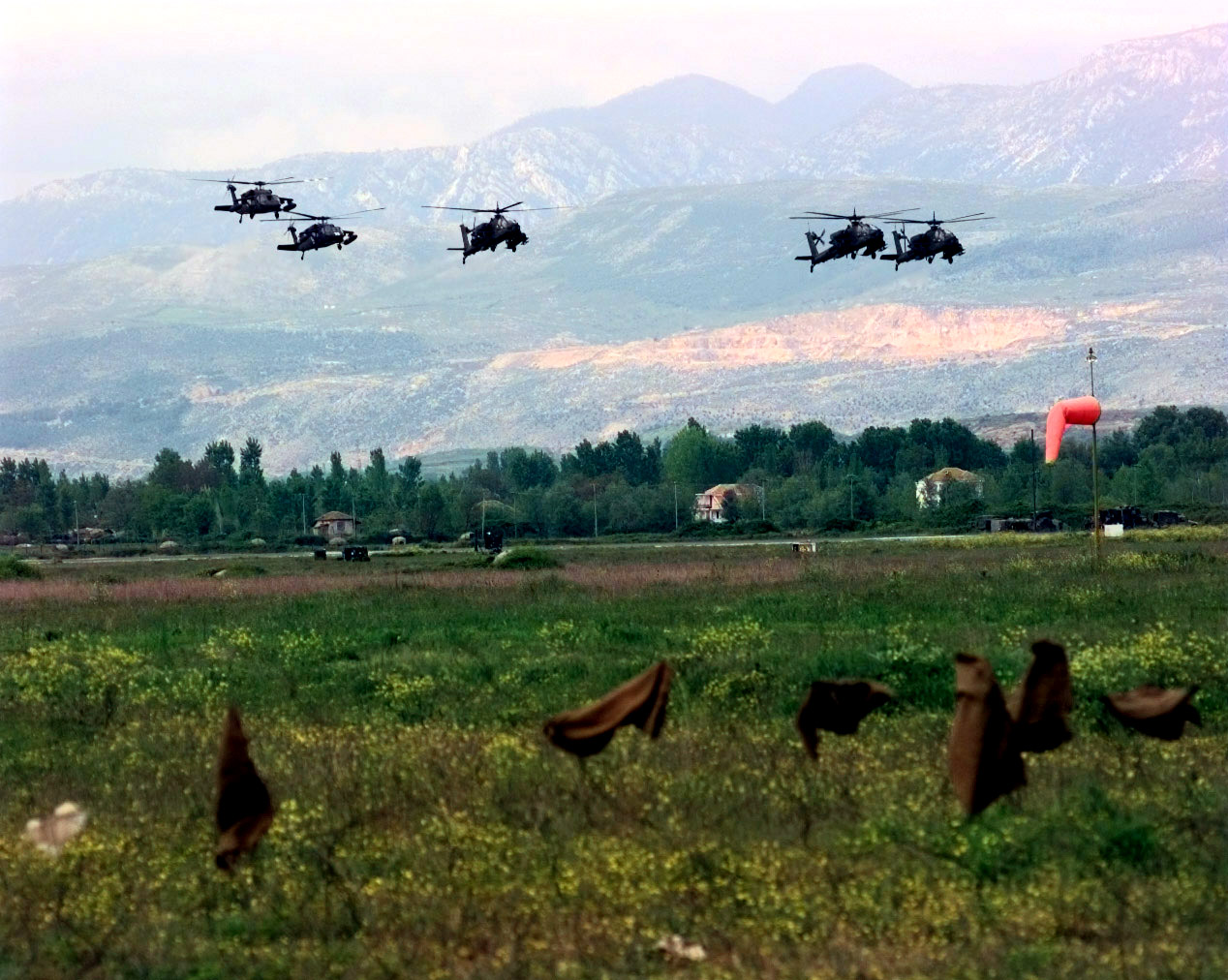
UH-60 Blackhawk and AH-64A Apache landing on 25 April 1999.

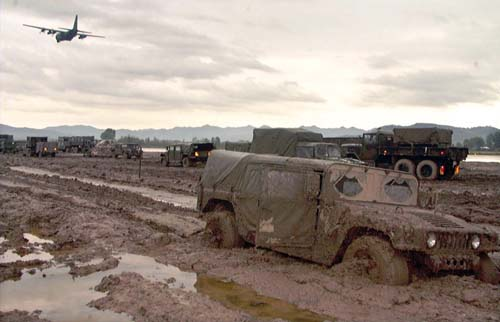
Muddy ground

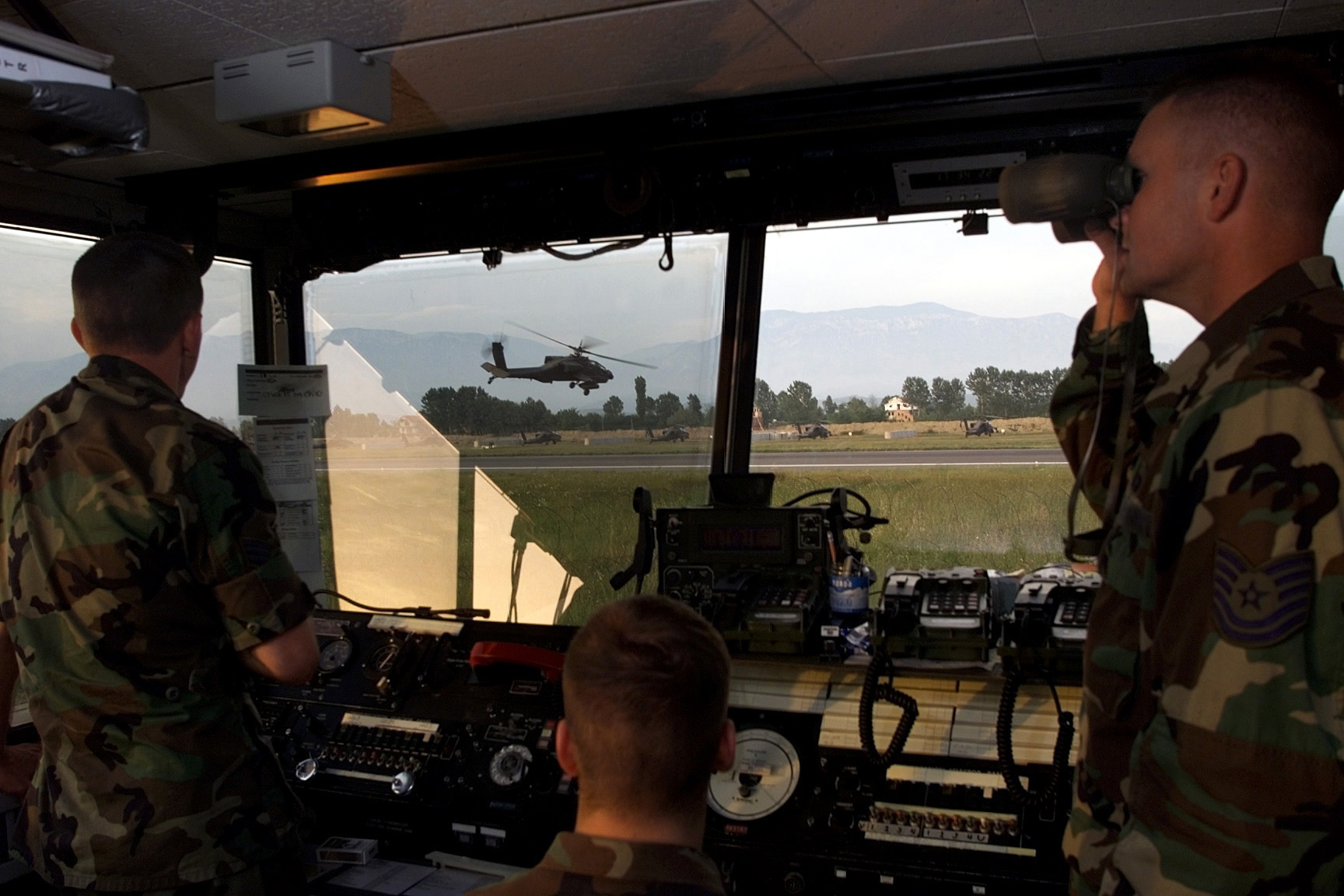
Air traffic control 31 May 1999.
