= Operation Ancient Babylon =

Military involvement, 2003–2006

- Part of Iraq War
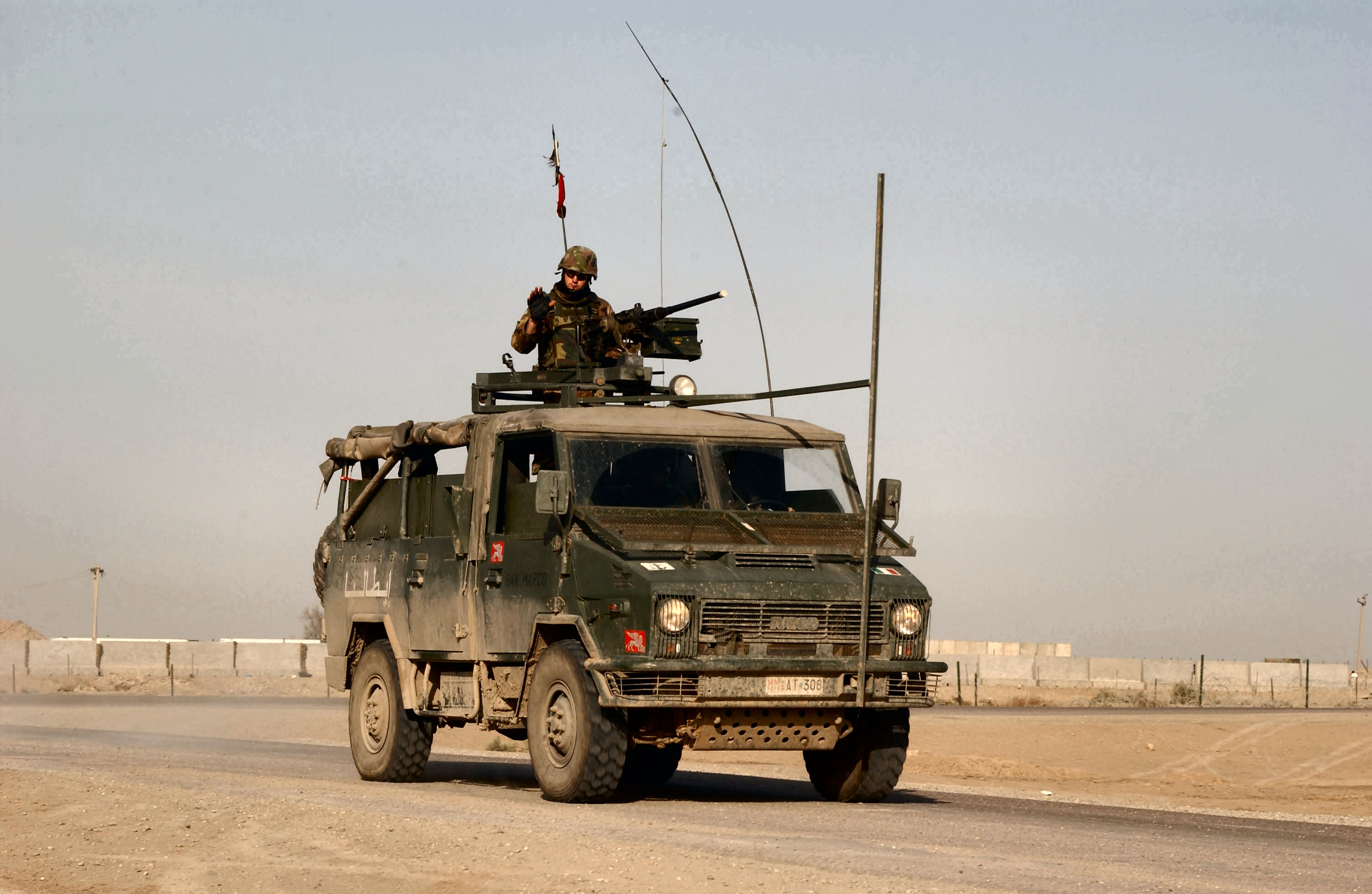
- Italian Navy marines depart Tallil Air Base, Iraq for an early morning convoy escort duty on 28 April 2005
Date	15 July 2003 – 1 December 2006
Location	Mostly Nasiriyah, Iraq
Result	Italian Operational Success

Belligerents
Mahdi Army Jama'at al-Tawhid wal-Jihad	Italy; Romania; Portugal

Commanders and leaders
Muqtada al-Sadr; Aws al-Khafaji Abu Musab al-Zarqawi †	Italian brigade commanders

Units involved
Mahdi Army Jama'at al-Tawhid wal-Jihad	Italian brigade: Romanian infantry battalion and military police company; Portuguese military police units

Strength
Unknown	c. 3,200 Italian soldiers; c. 574 Romanian soldiers (420 army, 116 military police, 8 staff officers)

Casualties and losses
Unknown	36 Italian casualties 1 Romanian casualty

Operation Ancient Babylon (Italian: Operazione Antica Babilonia) was the code name given to the deployment of Italian forces during the Iraq War. Their mission lasted from 15 July 2003 to 1 December 2006. The troops were located in and around Nasiriyah.

Italy lost 36 soldiers during the mission, half of them in the 2003 Nasiriyah bombing against the Carabinieri Multinational Specialized Unit base. Italian forces were assisted by Portuguese and Romanian troops, the latter of which suffered one casualty.

== Italian intervention ==
In March 2003, the invasion of Iraq was launched by a coalition composed mainly of British and US armies, with soldiers from other countries, including Italy, participating. On 1 May 2003, the “end of combat operations” was declared, even though foreign armies never had full control of Iraq, suffering serious losses inflicted by the Iraqi insurgency.

UN Resolution 1483 of 22 May 2003 approved by the United Nations Security Council calls on all states to contribute to the rebirth of Iraq, fostering the security of the Iraqi people and the development of the nation.

Italy participated in Operation Ancient Babylon by providing forces in southern Iraq, with a main base in Nasiriyah.

On 15 April 2003 the Chambers, through the approval of resolutions, authorized the Government to carry out a military mission in Iraq (called Ancient Babylon) for humanitarian purposes. The parliamentary authorization intervened even before the adoption of Resolution 1483 and in a phase in which the difficulty of control of the territory by the occupying authorities and the Iraqi authorities had not yet clearly emerged.

The Italian mission began on 15 July 2003 and is a military operation for the purposes of peacekeeping (maintenance and safeguarding of peace), which has the following objectives:

- reconstruction of the Iraqi "security sector" through assistance for training and equipment of forces, at central and local level, both in the context of NATO and bilaterally;
- creation and maintenance of the necessary security framework;

competition for the restoration of public infrastructures and the reactivation of essential services;

- radiological, biological and chemical measurements;

competition for public order;

- military police;
- airport management contest;
- competition for reclamation activities, with the use of the dog component;
- support for ORHA activities;
- control of the territory and the fight against crime.

== The participation of the Italian Navy ==
The Italian Navy deployed various ships including minesweepers, destroyers and the San Giorgio-class amphibious transport dock that covered the role of flagship. Furthermore, marines and sailors alongside naval pilots given support to ground operations.

== The displacement ==
The Italian soldiers and the riflemen of the San Marco were deployed in the south Shiite Shi, a relatively quiet area compared to the provinces sunnite and to the capital Baghdad; the main seat of the contingent was the city of Nāsiriyya, the provincial capital of Dhi Qar, where the Italian Barbara Contini was placed by the Coalition Provisional Authority (CPA) at Head of the civil administration in charge of reconstruction.

This did not prevent the Italian soldiers from being the subject of a suicide attack in 2003, in which 19 of the 23 dead were Italian, military and civilian.

== Logistic operations before the battle for the bridges ==
Following the 12 November 2003 attack on the "Maestrale" base, the situation in Nassiriya of the Italian peace contingent changed, began to make itself felt more present in the province of Dhi Qar, an act not acceptable to the various hostile factions operating in the area, in the case of the faction of the Iraqi Shia cleric Muqtada al-Sadr and his army of the Mahdi, a group believed to be mainly involved in the attack on the carabinieri at the "Maestrale" base. At 4:00 am on 6 April 2004 the Italian land contingent, or three companies of the 11th Bersaglieri Regiment, a Regiment "Savoia Cavalleria" (3rd) company with eight B1 Centauros and various logistic components of the Ariete Armored Brigade, left the "White Horse" complex to go to guard the access bridges to Nassyriya: "Alpha", "Bravo", "Charlie". Reaching the city at 6:00 am, the units that were involved in this clash fought for 18 hours, the longest firefight that involved Italians since the Second World War, which is why the 11th Bersaglieri Regiment received the War Cross for Military Valor, for the maneuvers carried out on the three bridges in those days of the Ancient Babylon III mission.

== The battle for the bridges ==
In Nassiriya, a few months after the attack on 12 November 2003, from 6 April to 6 August 2004, several battles took place between the Italian troops and the Mahdi Army; the Italian military were engaged in the city in several clashes, in which over 30,000 bullets were fired, to control three bridges that allow the passage of the river, in which eleven gunmen were slightly injured; Iraqi casualties were heavy (out of 200), including a woman and two children, and as many injured. In Italy they are known generically as the Battle of the bridges of Nassiriya, even if we refer to three different episodes with clashes between hundreds of Italian soldiers on one side and similar or higher numbers of militiamen on the other; in particular, in the first battle that took place on the night of 6 April, about 500 Italian soldiers and a thousand militiamen were employed; the objective was originally made up of all three bridges, but given the gathering of women and children among the militiamen on the third bridge, the Italians did not take any action to cross it, remaining to guard only one bank. For the occasion, called the Porta Pia operation, various companies from different departments were engaged, including the 11th bersaglieri regiment, a company from the San Marco battalion, a heavy armored squadron Centauro del Savoia cavalry, the GIS carabinieri and the paratroopers (carabinieri, but framed until 2002 in the Folgore Brigade) of the Tuscania regiment. During the fight, the Italian military were also targeted with portable anti-tank rockets of which about 400 were counted, to which they responded with about 30,000 shots of small arms and some missiles, as well as some shots of the Centauro armored vehicles; observers noted how the militiamen had taken several ambulances from hospitals and used them to transport ammunition to their outposts.

The third battle took place from 5 to 6 August 2004, on the three bridges over the Euphrates, named Alfa, Bravo and Charlie (the first three letters of the NATO phonetic alphabet), to restore access to the city by supplies for the citizenship, forbidden by militiamen; the action was entrusted to a reinforced tactical group of the task force called Serenissima. At the time the Libeccio base, which until the attack hosted the Italian operational presence in the city together with the Mistral base, had already been evacuated, but was re-occupied for the occasion by the 3rd company of the Lagunari who presided over it together with the Alfa bridge despite being targeted by mortar bombs and small arms during the approach. On the Italian side, thermal visors and illuminating grenades were used to precisely identify the starting points of the shots, in full residential area and therefore with risk for the population, together with two Mangusta helicopters that from above provided information and protection. This did not prevent an episode that was subsequently investigated by the military prosecutor and articles in the media: a vehicle, which tried to cross one of the bridges by forcing the Italian checkpoint on the opposite access to that of origin, was considered a car bomb and hit by the Italian military who garrisoned it and exploded catastrophically killing passengers including a pregnant woman. According to a reconstruction, the investigation by the Italian military prosecutor found that the vehicle was an ambulance and the explosion was also due to an oxygen cylinder carried on it, but the military interrogated had previously denied having seen flashers and signals of rescue and claimed to have been subjected to gunfire. Subsequently, another reconstruction cited documents published on WikiLeaks that denied the use of firearms from the ambulance but confirmed that it had been transformed into a car bomb and that it did not stop at the checkpoint.

Overall, the battles led to the loss of the "Libeccio" logistics complex and the retreat of the Mahdi army from the city.

=== Role of the Romanian armed forces ===
The Romanian contingent consisting of the 26th Infantry Battalion "Neagoe Basarab", known as the Red Scorpions, under the command of lieutenant colonel Nicolae Ciucă also participated in the second battle in May 2004 along with a company of the 265th Military Police Battalion which acted in the defense of the Libeccio base. This was the first military engagement of the Romanian Armed Forces ever since the end of World War II. During the battle, the Romanian forces were stationed at Camp White Horse, 8 kilometres (5.0 miles) away from the city and controlled by the Italian 132nd Armored Brigade "Ariete". The Romanian battalion received an order from the Italian general Gian Marco Chiarini, commander of the 132nd brigade, to secure access routes to Nasiriyah, including a bridge over the Euphrates, and prevent the entry and exit from the city of members of the Mahdi Army.

Following this, Ciucă and a column of ten armored personnel carriers went to the bridge over the Euphrates on the night of 14/15 May. The force did not include all of the troops of the battalion, as a lieutenant stayed in the camp along some troops to remain as a rapid intervention reserve. The column was attacked two times by Iraqi soldiers with rifles and grenade launchers, to which the Romanian forces replied by opening fire. In the second attack, the commander ordered the troops to dismount and form a defensive perimeter between the road and the railway embankment. After the situation was evaluated, the order was given to clear the area. During the engagement, an RPG-7 hit one of the TABs, which damaged its wheels, leaving it behind the column with only one working wheel. After the fighting ended, the Romanian soldiers returned to base with their APCs suffering only material damage.

Ciucă later admitted having had fear during the battle and stated that God defended the Romanian troops. Furthermore, Ioan Mircea Pașcu, Minister of Defence of Romania at the time of the battle, said the battle of Nasiriyah helped Romania gain more confidence from the United States. He said in a 2013 interview "That was a moment when soldiers from all over America heard about Romania and, when they went home, talked to their families about Romania".

== Fallen in Iraq ==
The following Italian soldiers died in the operation:

- 17 May 2004 Nassiriya 1st senior caporal Matteo Vanzan.
- 5 July 2004 caporal major chosen (OR-4) Antonio Tarantino.
- 14 July 2004 Nassiriya sergeant (OR-5) Davide Casagrande.
- 21 January 2005 Nassiriya marshal chief (OR-9) Simone Cola.
- 4 March 2005 Baghdad Nicola Calipari.
- 14 March 2005 Nassiriya Sergeant (OR-5) Salvatore Domenico Marracino.
- 30 May 2005 Nassiriya 1st Marshal (OR-9) Massimiliano Bionidni
- 30 May 2005 Major Marco Briganti.
- 30 May 2005 Ordinary Marshal (OR-8) Marco Cirillo.
- 30 May 2005 Colonel Giuseppe Lima.
- 27 April 2006 Nassiriya Maggiore Nicola Ciardelli
- 27 April 2006 Nassirya Marshal (OR-8) Carlo De Trizio (Carabiniere)
- 27 April 2006 Marshal (OR-8) Franco Lattanzio (carabiniere).
- 7 May 2006 Nassiriya marshal chief (OR-9) Enrico Frassanito.
- 5 June 2006 Nassiriya 1st senior caporal Alessandro Pibiri
- 21 September 2006 Nassiriya 1st caporal major Massimo Vitaliano.

The following Romanian soldiers died in the operation:

- 27 April 2006 Nassiriya Corporal Bogdan Hâncu (military policeman).

== End of the mission ==
The Mahdi Army continued to fight on a smaller scale with the operation of guerrilla losing more and more men, means and territories. The mission ended on 1 December 2006.

== See also ==
- Iraq–Italy relations
- Iraq–Romania relations
- 2003 Nasiriyah bombing
- Multinational Specialized Unit

== Bibliography ==
- Luminosity: Report from Al Nasiriyah - Iraq, by Mauro Filigheddu, Strategic, 2020.
- Dobrițoiu, Radu-Constantin (2021). Podul Scorpionilor (in Romanian). Velvet Story. ISBN 9786069524503.
