= 2003 Nasiriyah bombing =

Suicide attack on Italian forces in Iraq

Nasiriyah Carabinieri Bombing
- Part of 2003–2006 phase of the Iraqi insurgency in Iraqi insurgency (2003–2011)
- Italian Police HQ Bombing (Iraq) Aftermath of the attack
- Location: Nasiriyah, Iraq
- Date: November 12, 2003
- Target: Multinational Specialized Unit headquarters
- Attack type: Suicide bombing, shootout
- Deaths: 18 Italian soldiers 1 Italian civilian 9 Iraqi civilians
- Injuries: 103 (including 20 Italian soldiers)
- Perpetrator: Jama'at al-Tawhid wal-Jihad
- Motive: Operation Ancient Babylon

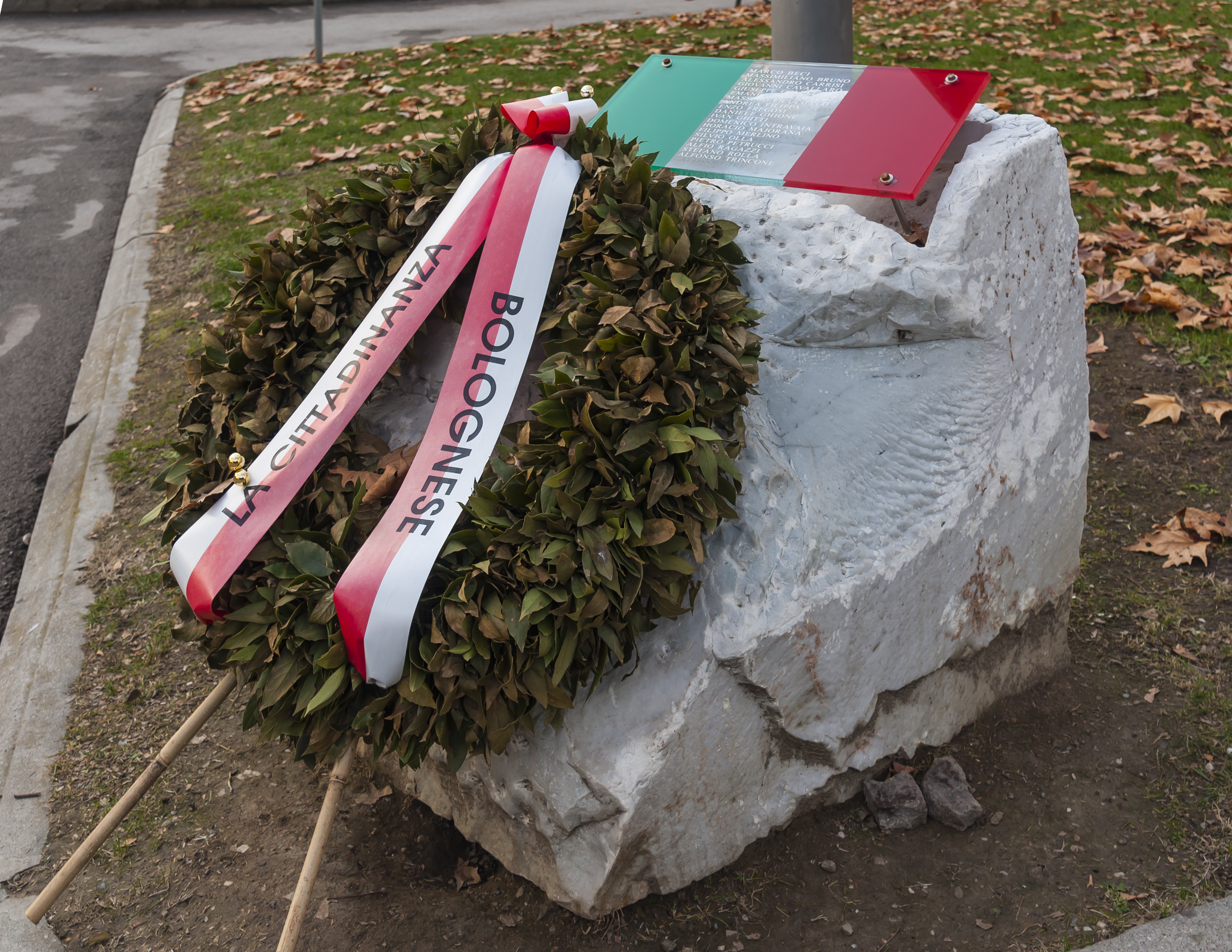
Nasiriyah bombing memorial in Bologna, Italy

The 2003 Nasiriyah bombing was a suicide attack on the Italian Carabinieri Multinational Specialized Unit (MSU) headquarters in Nasiriyah, Iraq, south of Baghdad on 12 November 2003. The attack resulted in the deaths of 18 Italian servicemembers, mostly members of the MSU, an Italian civilian, and 9 Iraqi civilians and was the worst Italian military disaster since World War II. The attack, labeled a "terrorist act" by Italian president Carlo Azeglio Ciampi, was among a string of many attacks on non-American military international targets in Iraq that occurred shortly after the end of major combat operations, including the Jordanian and Turkish embassies, ICRC, and UN facilities.

== Prelude ==
Before the 2003 U.S.-led invasion of Iraq, the future Carabinieri and Portuguese Guarda Nacional Republicana headquarters was the Nasiriyah Chamber of Commerce, a three-story structure near the Euphrates River. The first U.S. forces to occupy the building were Marines from the 15th Marine Expeditionary Unit, who were later relieved by reservists from the 2nd Battalion 25th Marines.

Italy took part in the Iraq War, as part of the Multi-National Force – Iraq, from 15 July 2003 until 1 December 2006, in and around Nasiriyah (see Operation Ancient Babylon). On July 19, 2003 the Marines in Nasiriyah were replaced by members of the Carabinieri and Italian army. Italian forces in Iraq were under British command and those in Nasiriyah were some of about 3,000 total Italian servicemembers in the country, including 400 Carabinieri forces of the Multinational Specialized Unit.

== Attack ==
The attack began shortly before 11:00 a.m. when a large tanker truck sped towards the entrance of the base. Carabiniere Andrea Filippa, who was part of the unit guarding the main gate and was among the casualties, managed to shoot and kill the two drivers before the vehicle could smash through the gate and enter the compound. The tanker slammed onto the gate, stopped and exploded in a massive fireball. Nearby houses sustained structural damage and a car carrying five Iraqi women was incinerated, killing those inside. The blast was so powerful that buildings across the Euphrates river suffered shattered windows. The front of the three-story building serving as the Italian headquarters collapsed. 18 Italian troops, including 12 Carabinieri policemen were killed in the blast along with an Italian civilian. A further 20 Italians and 80 Iraqis were wounded.

== Aftermath ==
The attack was the worst incident involving Italian soldiers since Operation Restore Hope in Somalia and the highest loss of Italian soldiers since World War II. The attack thus shocked Italy and plunged it into a three-day mourning period. The soldiers were given a state funeral. Despite the large loss, Italian Prime Minister Silvio Berlusconi reaffirmed his commitment to the mission in Iraq and President George W. Bush said in a statement at the White House, "Today in Iraq, a member of NATO, Italy, lost some proud sons in the service of freedom and peace."

Italian Defence Minister Antonio Martino blamed Saddam Hussein loyalists saying, "evidence on the ground and intelligence reports lead us to believe that today's attack was planned and carried out by remnants loyal to Saddam... united with Arab extremists."

== Film ==
- Nassiryia - Per non dimenticare
- 20 Cigarettes

== See also ==
- Operation Ancient Babylon
- 2017 Nasiriyah attacks
- Multinational Specialized Unit
