= New Bridge, Mitrovica =

Bridge across the Ibar river in Mitrovica, Kosovo

New Bridge Mitrovica Bridge Ibar Bridge Austerlitz Bridge
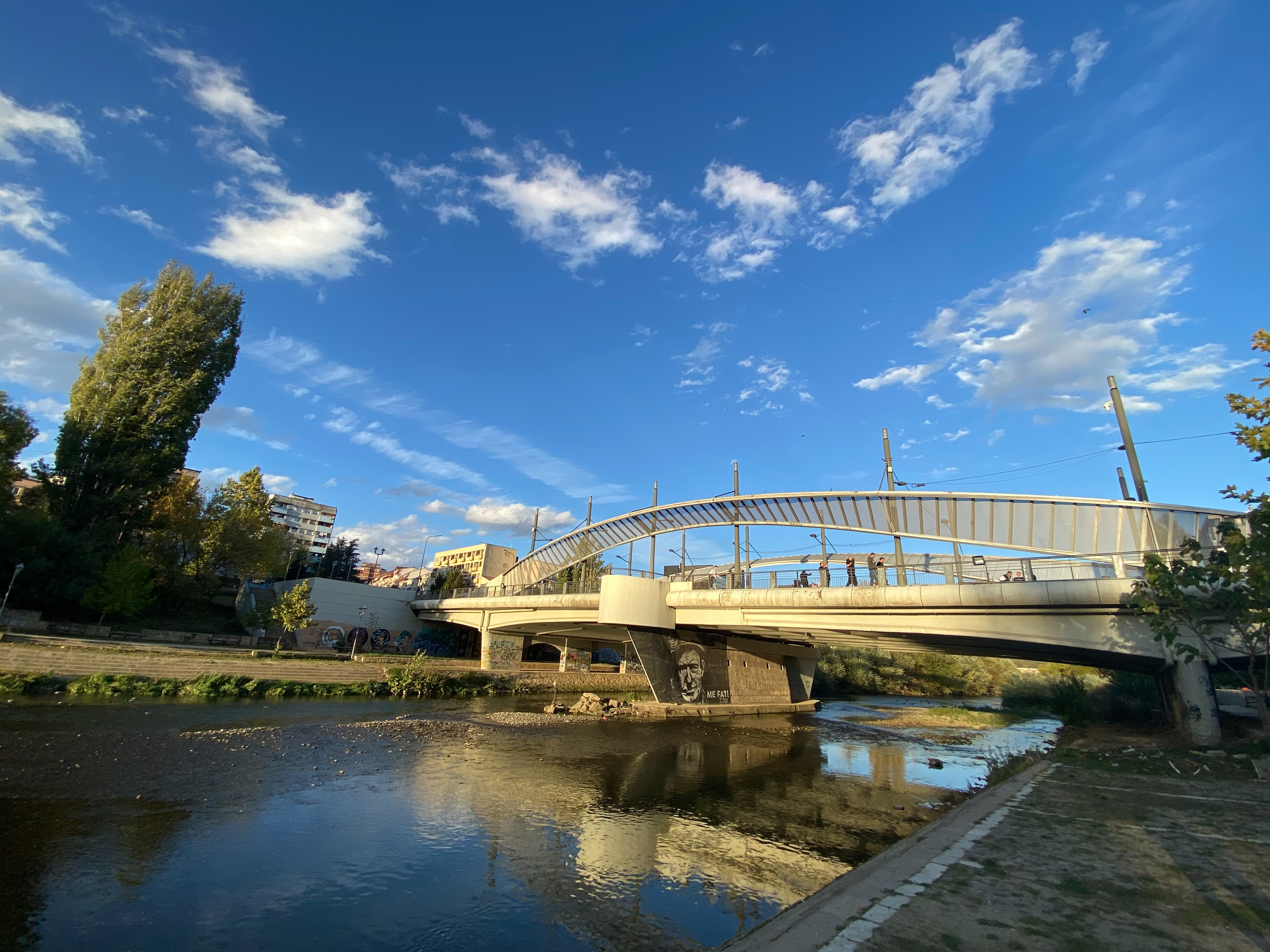
- New Bridge in Mitrovica, in October 2023
- Coordinates: 42°53′30″N 20°51′58″E
- Crosses: Ibar
- Locale: Mitrovica

History
- Engineering design by: Freyssinet
- Opened: June 2001; 25 years ago
- Rebuilt: 2000–2001

Location
- Interactive map of New Bridge; Mitrovica Bridge; Ibar Bridge; Austerlitz Bridge

The Ibar Bridge (also known as Mitrovica Bridge, Ibar River Bridge, New Bridge or by its unofficial name Austerlitz Bridge) is a steel truss bridge crossing the Ibar river in Mitrovica, Kosovo, connecting South Mitrovica and North Mitrovica. The Ibar Bridge became an iconic symbol of Kosovo's division, as it separated Kosovo Albanians living predominantly in the south from Kosovo Serbs and other nationalities predominantantly living in the north.

In period from 2001 (when it was re-opened) until 2014, at times the bridge was used as a military checkpoint and provided a de facto boundary and buffer zone between the mainly ethnic Serbian populated North Kosovo and the rest of Kosovo which has an ethnic Albanian majority. Over the years, Carabinieri patrols from KFOR-MSU and later Kosovo Police secured the bridge.

Today, the bridge is open to pedestrians and there is no longer any checkpoint, but is secured by the Kosovo Police.

== History ==
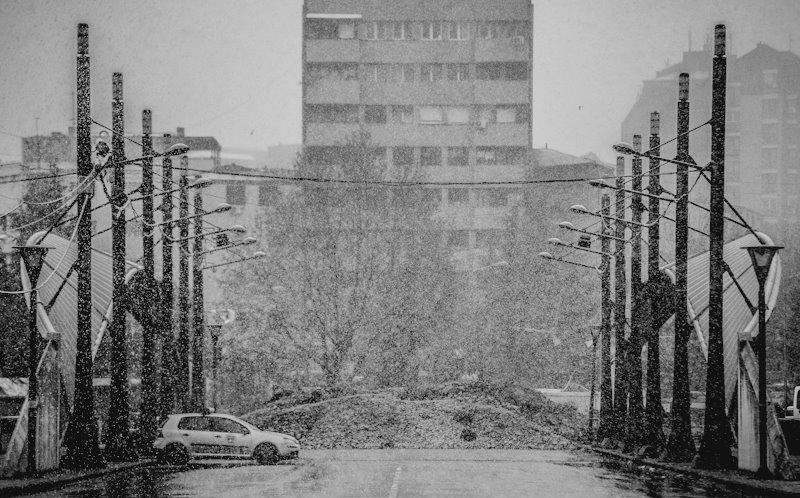
First snow on the main bridge in Mitrovica.

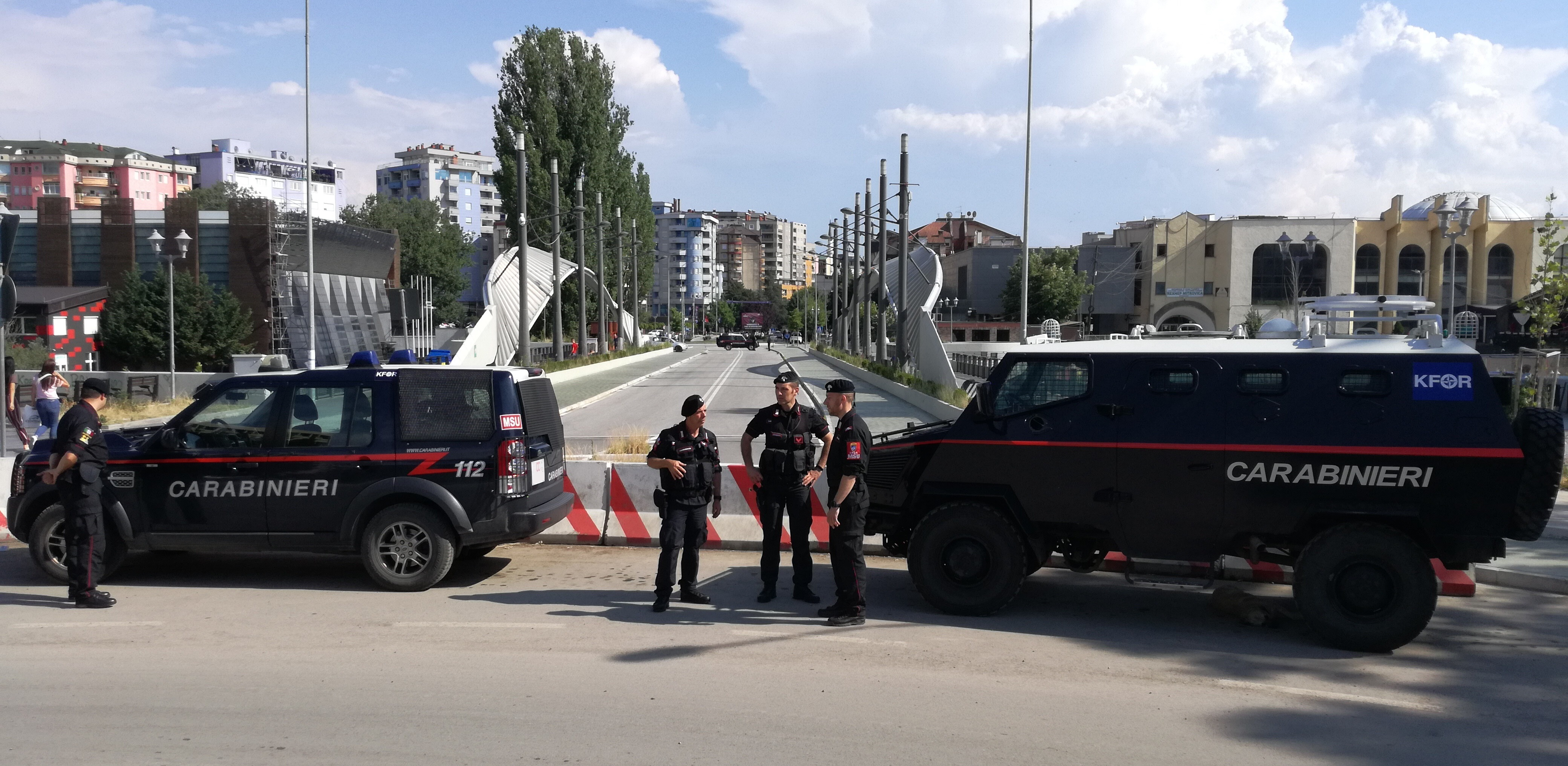
KFOR-MSU Carabinieri Patrols, in front of the renovated Ibar Bridge, in Mitrovica, Kosovo. (2019).

Fromm 2000 until 2001, the bridge was refurbished with the French government money. Structural operations such as the widening of the central pier, the reconstruction of the slab and pavements made of concrete and the replacement of the bearings and expansion joints were performed on the 100-meter-long (330 ft) bridge construction. Apart from these bridge repair actions the works also included the placement of additional architectural elements such as viewpoints on the bridge, the supply and placement of lighting, bank access steps and the construction of two decorative arches. The Freyssinet company was awarded the contract to reconstruct the Mitrovica Bridge. The contract's terms stipulated that Freyssinet hire a multi-ethnic construction team to rebuild the bridge. In September 2000 the 61 workers from Kosovo were chosen - equal parts Albanians and Serbians. The project manager was Pierre Lottici. The Department of Transport and Infrastructure - a division of the UNMIK Joint Interim Administrative Structure (JIAS) - oversaw the bridge contract. At the end of June 2001, the finished bridge, at the final cost of DM 3 million was handed over to the City of Mitrovica.

The New Bridge is one of three bridges over the Ibar within Mitrovica. The other two, one leading to the railway station, and the other being an abandoned railway bridge, are only lightly used. The New Bridge is the main crossing point between the two sides of the city for pedestrians.

People from Mitrovica and even soldiers from KFOR often refer to the bridge calling it "Austerlitz Bridge", due to the close resemblance to the French Viaduc d'Austerlitz.

Since 2012, the northern and southern edges of the bridge have been patrolled all-day by the Italian Carabinieri from KFOR-MSU to maintain peace and stability in the area and to deter illegal activities.

In 2025, after the international community opposed reopening the Ibar Bridge, the Kurti cabinet quickly pushed ahead with constructing two new crossings over the Ibar River in Mitrovica, laying their foundations in July and completing them in record time. Within about two months, one bridge west of the Ibar Bridge was built for vehicles and pedestrians, and another to the east was opened as a pedestrian-only crossing - widely promoted locally and even dubbed "Albin’s Bridge" by South Mitrovica’s mayor. The two new bridges over the Ibar in Mitrovica cost approximately €3 million in total and were financed from the Kosovo government’s infrastructure budget. According to available reports, no international donors such as the EU or the United States contributed to their funding.

These projects have re-established uninterrupted connections between South and North Mitrovica after decades of division, aiming to increase mobility and unify the city’s Albanian and Serb communities despite controversy and mixed reactions from political actors and parts of the international community.

== See also ==
- District of Mitrovica
- Monuments in Mitrovica
