= Ruggiero Capodivento =

Italian Carabinieri General (born 1963)

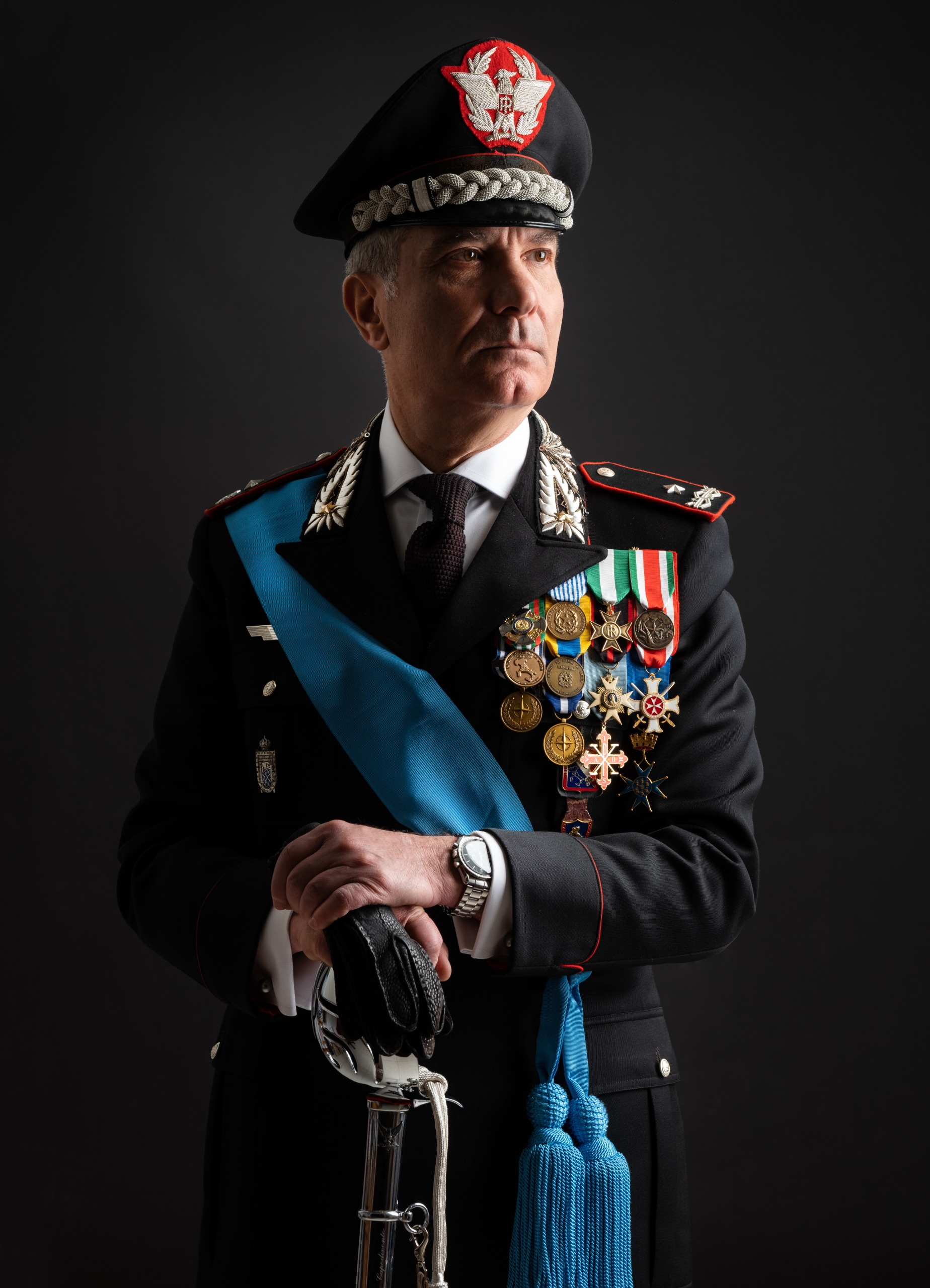
- Born: Ruggiero Capodivento; 24 July 1963 (age 63); Fabriano, Italy
- Children: 2
- Military career
- Allegiance: Italy; NATO
- Branch: Carabinieri
- Service years: 1983–present
- Rank: Brigadier general
- Unit: Carabinieri Legion "Toscana"
- Commands: Multinational Specialized Unit 2019 and 2023; MIADIT 16 (Djibouti), 2022.
- Engagements: Stabilisation Force in Bosnia and Herzegovina; Operation Joint Guardian; Operation Joint Enterprise
- Awards: Presidential Military Medal (Kosovo); Knight Order of Merit of the Italian Republic; Maurician medal; Pristina Key to the City.

Brigadier general Ruggiero Capodivento (born 24 July 1963) is a member of the Italian Carabinieri, 20th and 26th commander of the Multinational Specialized Unit, and former commander of the international military mission "MIADIT 16", in Djibouti. He is currently serving as deputy commander of the Carabinieri Legion "Toscana".

== Military career ==
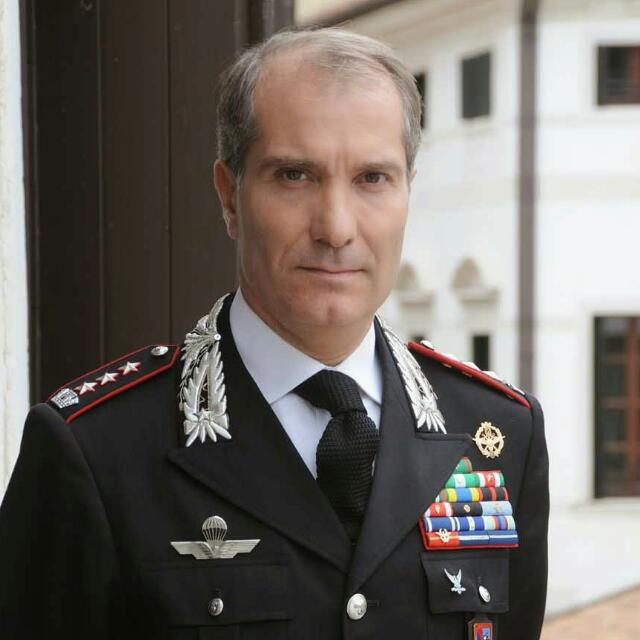
Ruggiero Capodivento, with the rank of colonel.

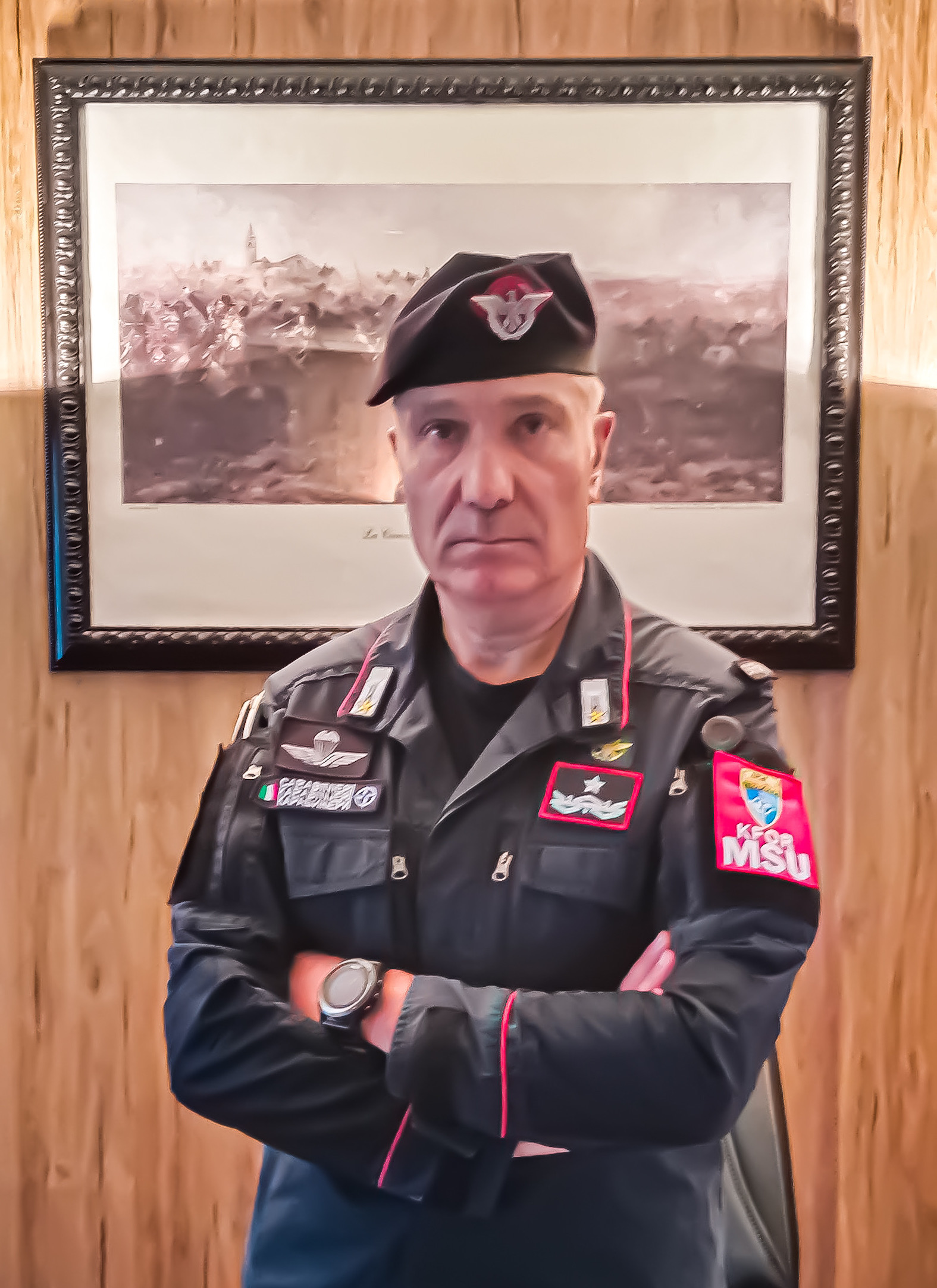
Ruggiero Capodivento, during his second tour as MSU commander.

He joined the Carabinieri in 1983 with the rank of carabiniere ausiliario. He attended the Military Academy of Modena between 1984 and 1986, acquiring the rank of sub-lieutenant. Then, he completed his military studies at the Carabinieri Officers' School of Rome. In 1988 he was promoted to lieutenant and was chosen as commander of a platoon of cadets at the Carabinieri Marshal School of Florence. From 1990 to 1991 he led the Criminal Investigation Team of the Carabinieri Company of Mestre (VE, Italy).

At the end of 1991 he was promoted to the rank of captain and was appointed to the command of the Carabinieri Company of Reggio Emilia.

In 1997, he moved to the Carabinieri Company of Pozzuoli (NA, Italy), as the commander of the unit. In the next years he was promoted to rank of major and led a section at the Carabinieri Officers' School of Rome.

From 2004 to 2009, he was detached as a staff officer at General Defence Headquarters in Rome. In 2004, he was deployed in Sarajevo for the NATO mission SFOR (Bosnia and Herzegovina). In 2005, he was promoted to the rank of lieutenant colonel.

In 2009, he was promoted to colonel and was assigned to the Carabinieri Training Schools’ Command in Rome as departmental chief. From 2012 to 2013 he was detached to the city of Kochi, India as the Carabinieri officer for the Enrica Lexie case.

In 2013, he commanded the Carabinieri district of Treviso and in 2016, was nominated chief of staff of the Carabinieri Legion "Toscana".

From 15 September 2018, he has been the 20th commander of the Multinational Specialized Unit (MSU) of KFOR. He ended his service as KFOR-MSU commander on 16 October 2019, and was awarded with the Medal of Merit from the Kosovo Police and the Minister of Internal Affairs Ekrem Mustafa and the Presidential Military Medal, the highest Kosovo military decoration, from president Hashim Thaçi.

After returning to Italy in 2019, he returned to once more be the chief of staff of Carabinieri Legion "Toscana". On 5 October 2020, he left the position of chief of staff to be appointed as the deputy commander of the same unit.

From 31 January 2022 to 31 May 2022, he was the commander of the MIADIT 16, deployed in Djibouti, a military mission with the aim to train the Somali Armed Forces alongside local security forces.

On 8 February 2023, he returned to Kosovo as commander of the Multinational Specialized Unit of KFOR.

On 26 July 2023, he was promoted to brigadier general.

During his career, he was the only officer in charge of the KFOR-MSU Regiment in two different years (2019 and 2023) and the only one holding the command with the rank of brigadier general, achieved during his mandate.

He served as MSU commander until 10 February 2024. At the end of his mandate the mayor of Pristina Përparim Rama awarded him the Key to the City, highest decoration of the municipality.

He is currently serving as chief of staff of the Carabinieri Legion "Toscana".

== Studies ==
Capodivento graduated from high school as a chartered building surveyor in 1982 and in Law at the University of Macerata in 1993. He then obtained a degree in "Security Sciences" at the University of Rome "Tor Vergata" in 2003 and a Master's degree in Strategic Sciences at the University of Turin.

He also qualified as a lawyer in 1999.

== Personal life ==
Capodivento is married and has two sons.

== Related voices ==
- Carabinieri
- Multinational Specialized Unit
