= Orders, decorations, and medals of Kosovo =

State decorations of the Republic of Kosovo are regulated by the Law on Decorations. Decorations are divided into three grades: orders, medals and commemorative medals. The President also bestows the title of Honorary Ambassador of Kosovo to people who have made extraordinary contributions to the Republic of Kosovo. This is an honour bestowed very rarely with only nine recipients in the history of the Republic.

The orders, decorations and medals are awarded by the President of Kosovo, though nominations might come from: Chairman of the Assembly, Prime Minister, President of the Supreme Court and the Electoral College, Chief Prosecutor of Kosovo, Minister, Chief of General Staff, General Director of Kosovo Police, President of the Municipal Assembly, President of the Academy of Sciences and Arts.

== Honorary Titles ==
1. Honorary Ambassador of Kosovo

== Orders ==
1. Hero of Kosovo Order
2. Order of Freedom
3. Order of Independence
4. Order of the "Adem Jashari" Freedom Fighter

== Medals ==
1. Presidential Medal of Merit (Medalja Presidenciale e Meritave)
2. Military Medal for Service in Kosovo (Medalja Ushtarake për Shërbim në Kosovë) for military personnel
3. Medal of Merit (Minister of Internal Affairs)
4. Medal of Merit of the Red Cross of Kosovo (bronze, silver and gold versions)
5. Presidential Medal for Rule of Law

== Recipients ==
Order of Freedom

- Donald Trump
- Joe Biden

Order of Independence

- Hassanal Bolkiah
- Anwar Ibrahim

Presidential Medal of Merit:

- Dua Lipa
- Richard Grenell
- Robert O'Brien
- Ruggiero Capodivento
- World Bank
- Jonathan Saiger
- Edi Rama
- Gianni Infantino
- Kosovo national football team

Presidential Medal for Rule of Law:

- Beau Biden

== Military ==
Military Medal for Service in Kosovo

- Finnish Defence Forces

== See also ==
- Orders and medals of Federal Republic of Yugoslavia
