= Romanian Military Police =

- Active: 1990 – present
- Country: Romania
- Branch: Romanian Land Forces
- Type: Military Police
- Size: 1 MP Bn. and MP Platoons
- Garrison/HQ: Bucharest
- Mottos: Semper et ubique (anytime, anywhere)

The Romanian Military Police (Romanian: Poliția Militară) is the military police of the Romanian Armed Forces. It was formed in 1990, immediately after the Romanian Revolution, although the Romanian Gendarmerie (also re-established in 1990) performed military police duties between 1850 and 1949.

== Mission ==
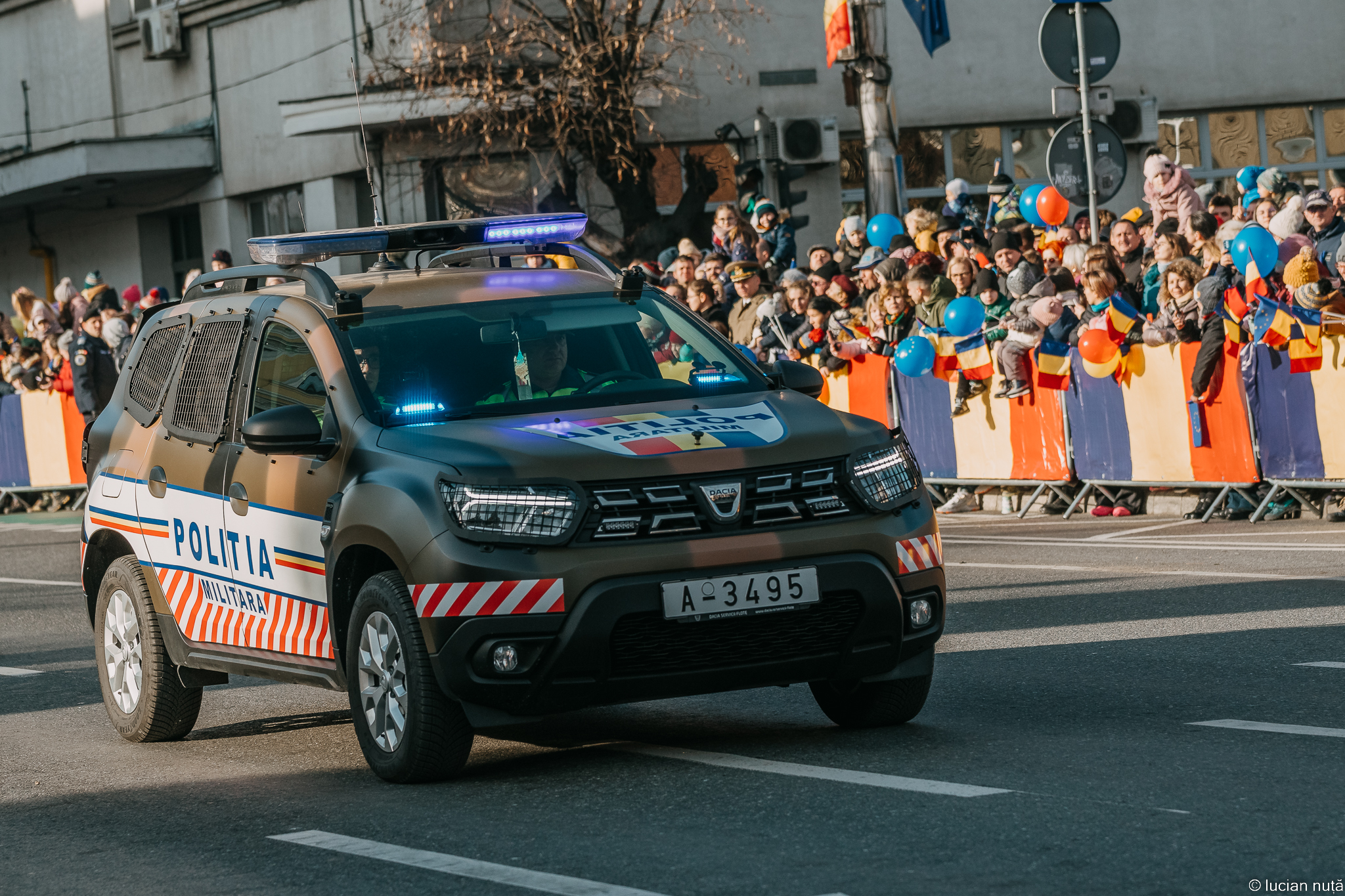
Romanian Military Police car

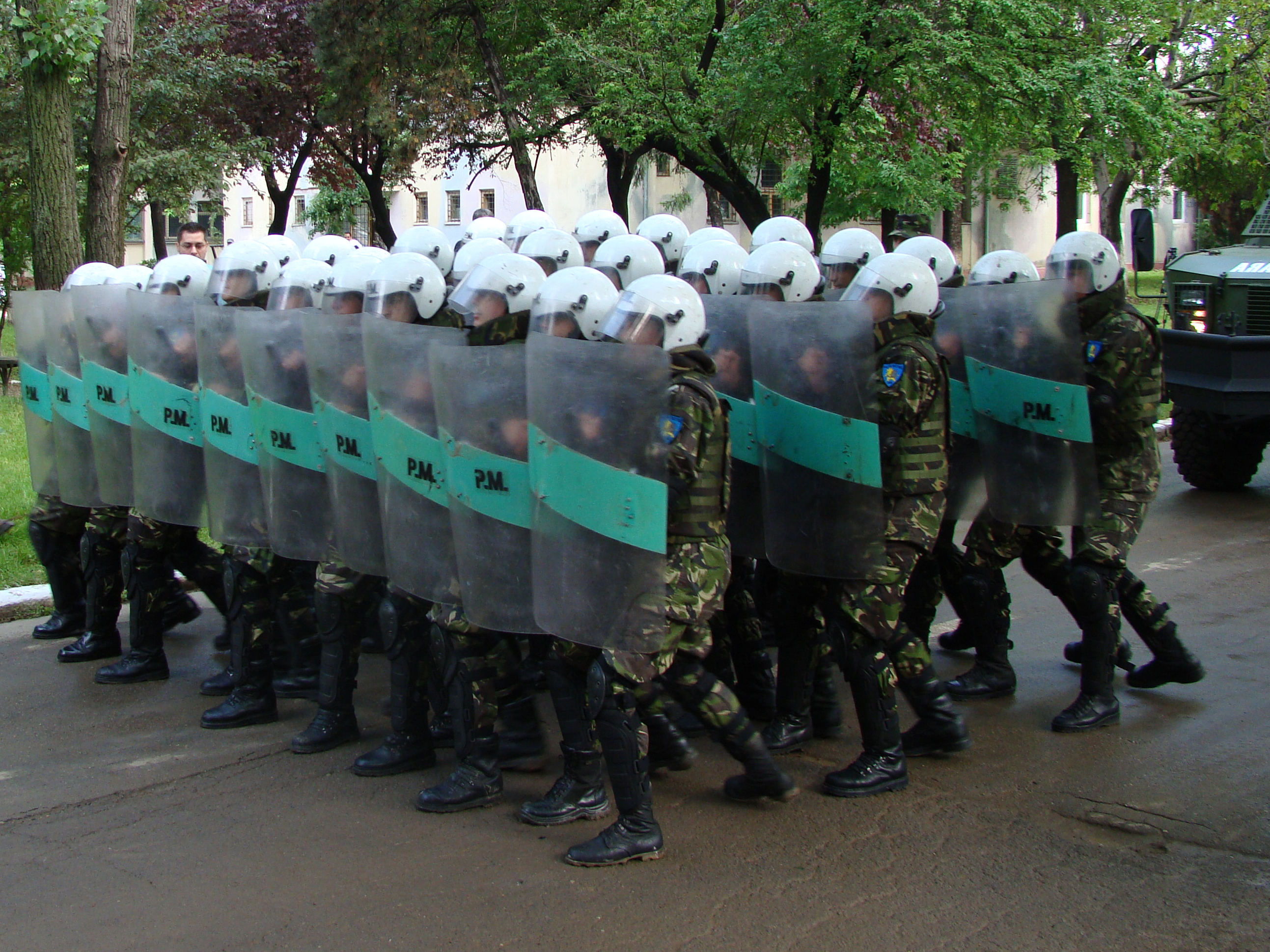
265th Military Police Battalion exercise.

The duties of the Military Police are:

- Controls the military personnel and documents
- Controls and maintains discipline in places/crowded areas frequented by military personnel and eliminates any conflicts between military personnel or military personnel and civilians
- Maintains the security during military exercises/parades
- Prevents the smuggling of illegal devices/materials/substances into the military units/bases
- Maintains the safety and discipline at military tribunals
- Apprehends deserters in cooperation with the Police, Gendarmerie, Romanian Intelligence Service and other agencies
- Prevents, independently or in cooperation with other forces, the stealing of military equipment, ammunition, armament and any other devices from military bases
- Maintains, when ordered, the security of the military detainees
- May undertake search and rescue/evacuation missions, together with the Romanian Inspectorate for Emergency Situations/Gendarmerie/other Romanian Ministry of Interior forces, of civilian/military persons, in case of earthquakes, floods, or other disasters, and takes measures to limit/eliminate their causes (when possible) and their consequences.

== History ==
=== Beginnings ===
The history of the Romanian Military Police is closely related to the history of the Romanian Gendarmerie, because the provost policing was a task of the Gendarmerie since its inception.

It should also be noticed that at first the Gendarmerie was placed under the command of the Ministry of War. The archaic term of "troops' police" could be found starting with 1850 in the structure of the armed forces, but the day when the military police was established in its modern form was 5 November 1893. On that day King Carol I promulgated the Law of Rural Gendarmerie. As a part of this corps, the Military Police branch was tasked with the following duties:

- to act as judiciary police
- to search and arrest AWOLs and disobedient troops
- to arrest military personnel without proper documents while on leave
- to arrest/annihilate dangerous armed gangs
- to repel the attacks against guards
- to repel the attempts of prisoners to escape
- to search for illegal caches of weapons and ammunition
- to inform the population about mobilisation

In 1908, 1911 and 1913, new laws and regulations regarding the activity of military police forces were issued in order to increase its efficiency. To avoid any confusions, the new Law of Gendarmerie promulgated on March 24, 1908, mentioned the following:

- Art.6: The Gendarmerie corps is a part of the Army. The dispositions of military rules and orders are applicable except some specific situations because of its mixed organisation – both civilian and military – and specific tasks.
- Art.7: The officers will be recruited from the army's personnel. The nominated persons will be assigned to the Gendarmerie troops by King's order, who will issue a High Royal decree.

The same law stated that: "During military operations the Gendarmerie will act as Military Police in order to manage accurately the military traffic, the escort of prisoners and to assure the security of main objectives and installations".

In 1913–1916, some modifications regarding the MP organisation and strength were made and the corps was tasked with new duties, especially related to the security of some important economical areas (oil fields) and factories (mainly those factories who were producing military equipment and machinery).

=== World War I ===
During World War I the Military Police corps performed all its specific tasks, including combat missions, and provided assistance to the civilian population. The evolution of the events placed the Gendarmerie alternatively under the command of Ministry of War and Ministry of Interior.

In 1917 the Gendarmerie was reassigned to the Ministry of War. Therefore, Gendarmerie detachments were assigned to the General Staff headquarters as well. These detachments were led by infantry officers and their strength consisted of 27 gendarmes.

During the interwar period, the Gendarmerie was placed again under Ministry of Interior command, until 12 September 1940.

=== World War II ===
With Romania's entry in World War II starting on 22 June 1941, as part of Axis troops, the Gendarmerie/military police performed following main activities:

- preventing terrorist activities
- guarding civilian and military installations
- law enforcement
- repel the attacks of airborne enemy troops
- surveillance of political opponents

The Law 264 from 22 April 1943 stipulated that: "The Gendarmerie is a military corps. Its main mission is to perform the activity of civilian and military police across the country. It is subordinated to Ministry of War but may perform other activities when required by the Minister of Interior".

On 23 August 1944, during King Michael's Coup, the Romanian Government decided to leave the Axis and join the Allies, with the main objective to regain Northern Transylvania and liberate Hungary and Czechoslovakia.

The main missions accomplished by MP structures/units were:

- to identify enemy troops, disarm and neutralise them
- to block/restrict the enemy movements along main supply routes (MSRs) and alternate supply routes (ASRs)
- to arrest/annihilate enemy airborne troops
- to identify, occupy and guard enemy depots
- to arrest or annihilate the enemy troops or partisans behind the front
- to find and destroy pro-Nazi or Hungarian propaganda

Meanwhile, other Gendarmerie/MP units acted as light infantry, performing specific activities or fighting in close combat.

After the war, the military police was disbanded along with the Gendarmerie and its personnel was purged and/or reassigned to other structures.

=== The communist regime ===
Starting with 1947, the communist regime established some separate branches as parts of the Ministry of Defense to deal with military police matters. As a result, to this, Law and Discipline, Guide and Control of Military Traffic, Military Justice and Military Jail branches were set up. Each branch was assigned to different departments, breaking the chain of command – and making them quite inefficient.

== Current state ==
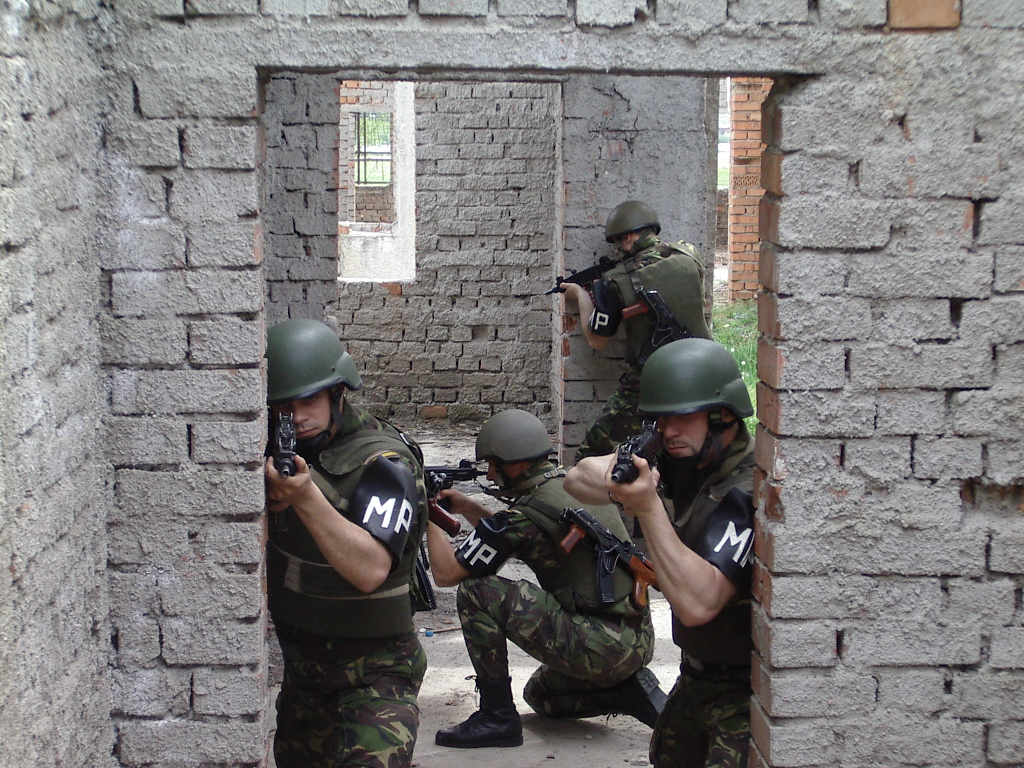
Romanian MP training.

In 1990, after the Romanian Revolution, the Ministry of National Defence decided to unify all the former MP-type branches into a single structure called "Military Police". On 12 March 1990, the Minister of National Defence issued an order to establish MP units/subunits all over Romania. Starting on 15 May 1990, the 265th MP Battalion, the 286th, 282nd, 295th, and 302nd companies were established under the Land Forces' command.

The 265th Military Police Battalion (Batalionul 265 Poliție Militară) is the largest and most important MP unit. It was formed in May 1990 and its headquarters are located in Bucharest. The battalion was often deployed to Iraq on peacekeeping missions. In December 2006, the unit received modernized Humvees that replaced the ARO's still in service.

Due to the reorganisation of the Romanian Land Forces, starting with 1999 some MP Companies were transformed into MP platoons and squads and some of them were reassigned to logistic or combat support units.

Starting with 2006, four Military Police-Guard Battalions were established. Their main mission is to guard military headquarters and installations. The total strength of these battalions is about 3,000 personnel.

=== International missions ===
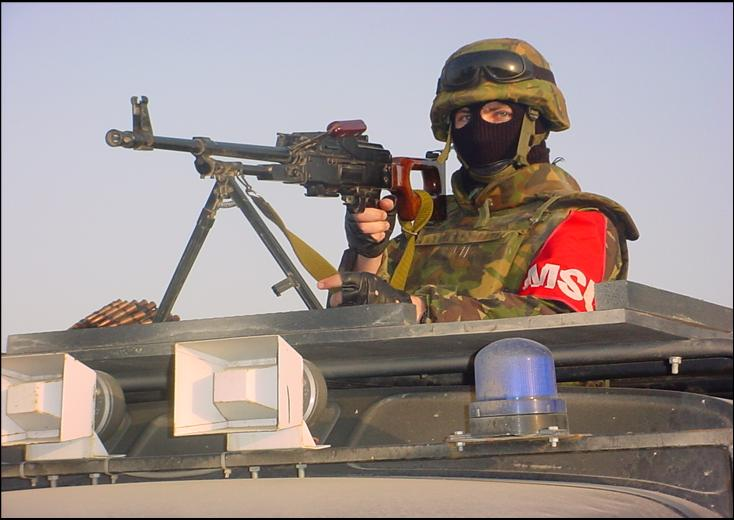
Romanian Military Policemen, member of MSU, in Iraq

1990, Saudi Arabia, Desert Storm – MPs were Guarding # 100 ROU Field Hospital. 1993–1995, Somalia UNOSOM- 1 ROU MP Coy 1995–1999, Angola UNAVEM – 1 ROU MP Coy 1997, Albania, AFMP – MP personnel acting as part of ROUDET 2001, FYROM* – NHQ Skopje MP personnel 2001–2006, Kosovo – 1 ROU MP Platon as part of GRE 34 TCC Coy, acting at Kosovo/FYROM (Djeneral Jankovic- Blace) border, and the Deputy Provost Marshal, KFOR HQ, Film City, Pristina

2000 -2004, Bosnia and Herzegovina A Romanian MP platoon (23 members) was detached to Bosnia and Herzegovina in July 2000, as part of the Multinational Specialized Unit (MSU) (until December 2004), as well as part of the EUFOR (since December 2004). Their main missions were to patrol with the local police and to maintain public order.

2002 – continuing, Afghanistan, different subordination, different MP structures 2003 – 2006, Irak, An Nasiryiah, 1 MP Coy mostly made of subunits of the 265th Military Police Battalion (but not only) were detached in July 2003, in Nasiriyah, Iraq, under the operational command of the Italian Carabinieri – in Multinational Specialized Unit in Iraq. They took mostly on reconnaissance missions, as well as VIP protection, recce, presence patrols, traffic control duties. The assignment ended in August 2006.
