= Operation Allied Harbour =

Operation Allied Harbor was NATO's first humanitarian operation. In the case of the Kosovo crisis, by the end of March 1999 these agencies were unable to cope with the massive influx of refugees into Albania. Within a fortnight over 200,000 refugees had arrived from Kosovo and NATO was the only organisation quickly able to meet the expanding need. HQ ACE Mobile Force (Land) was deployed within five days. Military personnel and staff set to work within twenty four hours of arrival, and within a few weeks, working closely with the civilian sector and the Albanian Government. By 15 June 1999 there were 479,223 refugees in the country. But the provision by NATO of medical, engineer, transport, security and staff support prevented Slobodan Milošević from destabilising Albania and proved instrumental in sustaining the refugees and in their eventual return to Kosovo.
