= John W. Hendrix =

United States Army general

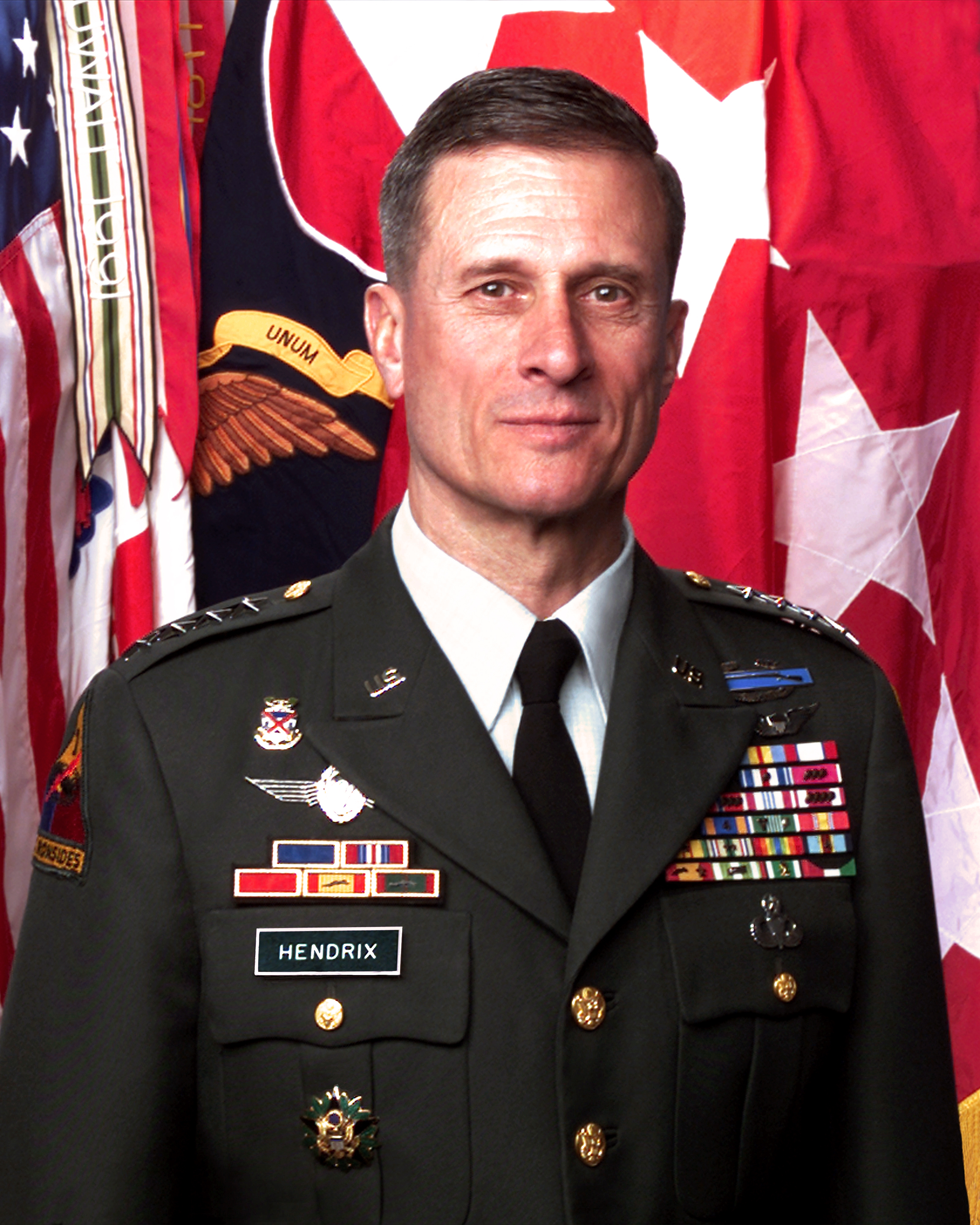
- General John W. Hendrix
- Born: 22 September 1942 (age 84); Bulloch County, Georgia, U.S.
- Military career
- Allegiance: United States
- Branch: United States Army
- Service years: 1965–2001
- Rank: General
- Commands: United States Army Forces Command; Task Force Hawk; V Corps; 3rd Infantry Division; United States Army Infantry Center; 2nd Brigade, 8th Infantry Division
- Conflicts: Vietnam War; Gulf War; Invasion of Panama; Kosovo War
- Awards: Defense Distinguished Service Medal; Army Distinguished Service Medal (2); Silver Star (2); Legion of Merit (4); Bronze Star Medal (4)

John Walter Hendrix (born 22 September 1942) is a retired United States Army four-star general who served as Commander, United States Army Forces Command from 1999 to 2001.

== Early life and education ==
Hendrix was born on 22 September 1942, in Bulloch County, Georgia, and received his commission after graduating from the Georgia Institute of Technology in 1965 with a degree in electrical engineering. Hendrix is of English, Scottish and Italian descent. He earned a master's degree in history in 1978 from Middle Tennessee State University, and is a graduate of both the United States Army War College and the United States Army Command and General Staff College.

== Military career ==
Hendrix's commands include V Corps; Task Force Hawk; 3rd Infantry Division, Fort Stewart, Georgia; and the United States Army Infantry Center, Fort Benning, Georgia.

Hendrix also served as deputy chief of staff for operations, United States Army Europe and 7th Army; assistant division commander, 1st Armored Division during the Gulf War; executive officer to the Supreme Allied Commander Europe, Supreme Headquarters Allied Powers Europe, Belgium; and assistant commandant, United States Army Infantry School, Fort Benning.

Hendrix completed several NATO assignments during the Cold War, including commander of 2nd Brigade, 8th Infantry Division, and served two tours of duty as a rifle company commander in the Republic of Vietnam. He retired from the army in 2001.

== Awards and decorations ==
Combat Infantryman Badge
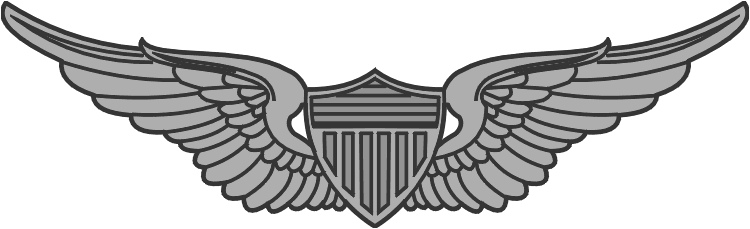
Basic Army Aviator Badge
Ranger tab
Master Parachutist Badge
Army Staff Identification Badge
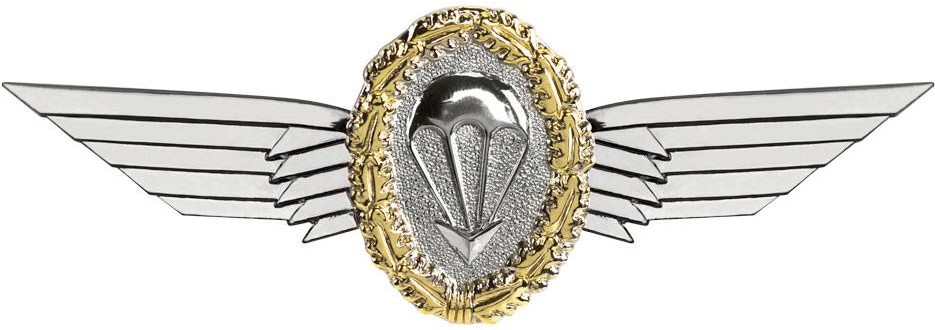
Silver German Parachutist Badge
1st Armored Division Shoulder Sleeve Insignia
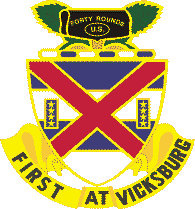
13th Infantry Regiment Distinctive Unit Insignia
? Overseas Service Bars

Defense Distinguished Service Medal
Army Distinguished Service Medal
Silver Star with one bronze oak leaf cluster
Legion of Merit with three oak leaf clusters
Bronze Star Medal with "V" device and three oak leaf clusters
Defense Meritorious Service Medal
Meritorious Service Medal with four oak leaf clusters
Air Medal with bronze award numeral 4
Army Commendation Medal with Valor device and silver oak leaf cluster
Army Presidential Unit Citation
Valorous Unit Award
Meritorious Unit Commendation
National Defense Service Medal
Vietnam Service Medal with one silver and one bronze service stars
Southwest Asia Service Medal with two service stars
Army Service Ribbon
Army Overseas Service Ribbon with numeral 4
Vietnam Gallantry Cross with palm and gold star
Vietnam Gallantry Cross Unit Citation
Vietnam Civil Actions Medal Unit Citation
Vietnam Campaign Medal
Kuwait Liberation Medal (Saudi Arabia)
Kuwait Liberation Medal (Kuwait)

== Post-military ==
In retirement, Hendrix sits on the board of advisors of the National Infantry Foundation, and worked for United Defense Industries. He was National Chairman of the Military Officers Association of America.
