= John Shannon Hendrix =

American architectural historian and philosopher

- Born: April 27, 1959 (age 67)
- Education: B.F.A. M.A. M.Arch. Ph.D.
- Alma mater: Art Institute of Chicago; Rhode Island School of Design; University of Illinois at Chicago; Cornell University
- Employer: Roger Williams University
- Title: Adjunct Professor of Art and Architectural History at Roger Williams University
- Website: www.johnshannonhendrix.com

John Shannon Hendrix (born 1959) is an architectural historian and philosopher who has written and lectured extensively on the subjects of architecture, art, philosophy, aesthetics, psychoanalysis, science, culture and history. Much of his work focuses on connections among those topics, such as interactions of vision, perception, and sensation with the arts and architecture, the relationships between psychoanalysis and architecture, physical sciences and architecture, and philosophy and architecture. His career focuses on research and writing about "mostly European precedents in architecture and philosophy, for the purpose of suggesting alternatives to the practice of architecture and philosophy at the beginning of the twenty-first century."

He has taught at Roger Williams University since 1999. He was Professor of Architectural History at the University of Lincoln, Lincoln, England from 2007 through 2015, Lecturer, History of Art and Visual Culture at the Rhode Island School of Design from 2004 through 2010, and has been lecturer at John Cabot University in Rome, the University of Connecticut, Rhode Island College, and the University of Massachusetts Lowell. He earned his B.F.A. in painting at the Art Institute of Chicago, M.A. at the Rhode Island School of Design, M.Arch. at the University of Illinois at Chicago, and a Ph.D. in architecture at Cornell University.

== Research and Theory ==
Hendrix's research and theoretical focus is directed toward developing modern alternatives to conventional practice of architecture and philosophy. Proposing approaches to contemporary practice of art and architecture, his teachings and writings relate interdisciplinary disciplines including aesthetics, cosmology, philosophy, and psychoanalysis.

Connecting concepts of justice with the symbolic nature of architecture, Hendrix has analyzed how medieval cathedrals' use of light provide symbolism of justice.

Developing new directions in urban planning based on psychoanalytic theory, Hendrix is a member of an international research group, based at Oxford Brookes University, designated "Architecture on the Couch: Psychoanalysis and the Environment." He is a member of the Institute for Psychoanalytic Studies in Architecture, the Foro di Studi Avanzati, and the International Society for Neoplatonic Studies.

== Books ==
- Cheney, Liana De Girolami; Hendrix, John Shannon, eds. (2002). Neoplatonism and the Arts (Studies in Art History). Lewiston, N.Y.: Edwin Mellen. ISBN 978-0-773469-85-3.
- Hendrix, John Shannon (2002). The Relation between Architectural Forms and Philosophical Structures in the Work of Francesco Borromini in Seventeenth-Century Rome. Lewiston: Edwin Mellen. ISBN 978-0-773469-95-2.
- Hendrix, John Shannon (2003). Architectural Forms and Philosophical Structures. New York: Peter Lang. ISBN 978-0-820467-26-9.
- Hendrix, John Shannon (2003). History and Culture in Italy. Lanham: University Press of America. ISBN 978-0-761826-28-6.
- Cheney, Liana De Girolami; Hendrix, John Shannon, eds. (2004). Neoplatonic Aesthetics: Music, Literature, and the Visual Arts. New York: Peter Lang. ISBN 978-0-820471-11-2.
- Hendrix, John Shannon (2004). Platonic Architectonics: Platonic Philosophies and the Visual Arts. New York: Peter Lang. ISBN 978-0-820471-10-5.
- Hendrix, John Shannon (2005). Aesthetics and the Philosophy of Spirit: From Plotinus to Schelling and Hegel. New York: Peter Lang. ISBN 978-0-820476-32-2.
- Hendrix, John Shannon (2006). Architecture and Psychoanalysis: Peter Eisenman and Jacques Lacan. New York: Peter Lang. ISBN 978-0-820481-71-5.
- Hendrix, John Shannon (2010). Robert Grosseteste: Philosophy of Intellect and Vision. Sankt Augustin: Academia Verlag. ISBN 978-3-896655-24-0.
- Hendrix, John Shannon; Carman, Charles H., eds. (2010). Renaissance Theories of Vision (Visual Culture in Early Modernity). Farnham, Surrey: Ashgate Publishing. ISBN 978-1-409400-24-0.
- Hendrix, John Shannon (2011). Architecture as Cosmology: Lincoln Cathedral and English Gothic Architecture. New York: Peter Lang. ISBN 978-1-433113-16-1.
- Emmons, Paul; Hendrix, John Shannon; Lomholt, Jane, eds. (2012). The Cultural Role of Architecture: Contemporary and Historical Perspectives. Abingdon, Oxon: Routledge. ISBN 978-0-415783-41-5.
- Hendrix, John Shannon (2013). The Splendor of English Gothic Architecture. London: Parkstone. ASIN B016XN18EO.
- Hendrix, John Shannon (2014). The Contradiction between Form and Function in Architecture. Abingdon, Oxon: Routledge. ISBN 978-0-415639-14-9.
- Temple, Nicholas; Hendrix, John Shannon; Frost, Christian, eds. (2014). Bishop Robert Grosseteste and Lincoln Cathedral: Tracing Relationships between Medieval Concepts of Order and Built Form. Farnham, Surrey: Ashgate Publishing. ISBN 978-1-472412-75-1.
- Hendrix, John Shannon (2015). Unconscious Thought in Philosophy and Psychoanalysis. London: Palgrave Macmillan. ISBN 978-1-137538-12-3.
- Hendrix, John Shannon; Holm, Lorens Eyan, eds. (2016). Architecture and the Unconscious. Abingdon, Oxon: Routledge. ISBN 978-1-472456-47-2.
- Hendrix, John Shannon; Proto, Francesco, eds. (2024). Lacan + Architecture. London: Palgrave Macmillan. ASIN B0DB4QYY6W. ISBN 978-3-031632-56-3.
