= Italian Carabinieri Bands =

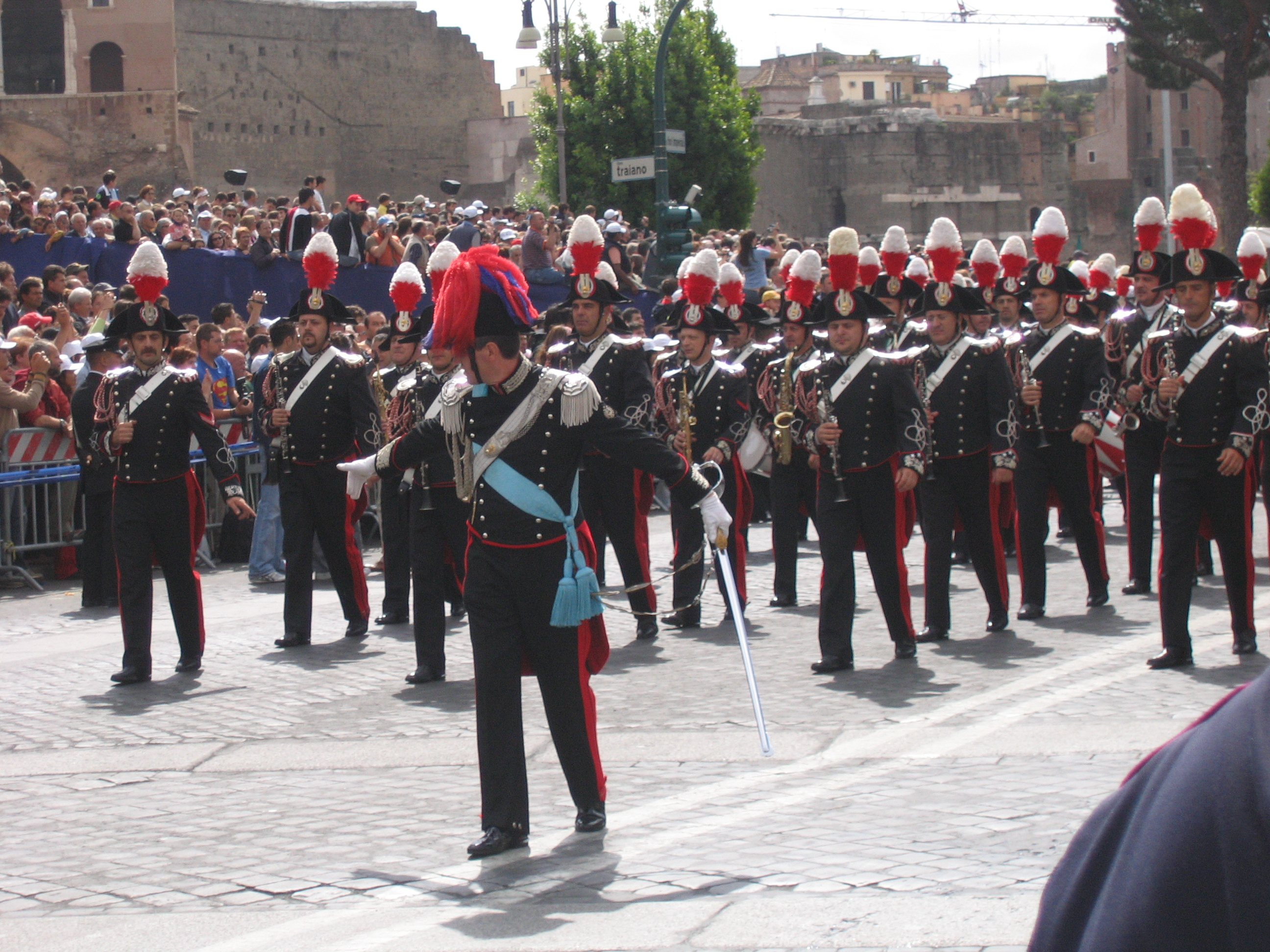
The National Band of Italian's Carabinieri Corps at the Republic Day parade in 2007.

Italian Carabinieri Bands (Banda dell’Arma dei Carabinieri) refers to the military/police bands that are a part of the Arma dei Carabinieri of the Italian Republic. These bands which serve at the Carabinieri's headquarters in the capital of Rome are among the most famous musical groups in Europe. The bands perform in the corps' ceremonial uniform, which includes a distinctive black uniform made of silver braids, and a traditional two-pointed hat known as the Lucerna or a bicorne. Since 2000, the bands of the Carabinieri have been under the direction of Massimo Martinelli.

== Origins, traditions, and present day ==
The original Carabinieri band was founded in 1820 when a fanfare team of trumpeters was introduced into the Royal Carabinieri Corps for the first time. This group performed ceremonial fanfares for the Italian King and the Royal Carabinieri for over 40 years before being expanded into a formal brass band and then developed into a full band contingent in 1862. Since 1920, the band has been branded and identified under its present name. The prestige of the band grew very quickly in Italy and abroad, with its first tour since its inception being to Paris in 1916, performing with the French Republican Guard Band at monuments and memorials for veterans and wounded active servicemen of the First World War. Beginning in 1947, which was two years after the end of the Second World War and one year after the establishment of the Italian Republic, the band took part in a world tour which included 25 countries in the newly liberated European continent, Brazil, Japan, and 35 cities in the United States.

With Carabinieri bands also serving as police band alongside their military role, the bands of the corps traditional participate in law enforcement related events, such as the International Festival of Police Bands in Japan in 2001, as well as in the World Expo in Aichi in 2005. In 2001 the band performed for Pope John Paul II during the first official visit of a pontiff to the Chamber of Deputies. Today the bands of the corps account for 102 professional musicians, who play a vast repertory varying from original pieces composed specially for the band, to famous military marches and modern music, performing in concert halls, theaters, on radio or television.

The oldest of these, the Rome-based National Band, is the official presidential band of the Republic, co-shared in this duty by the Mounted Band, made up of mounted musicians assigned to the Carabinieri Cavalry Regiment.

== Structure ==
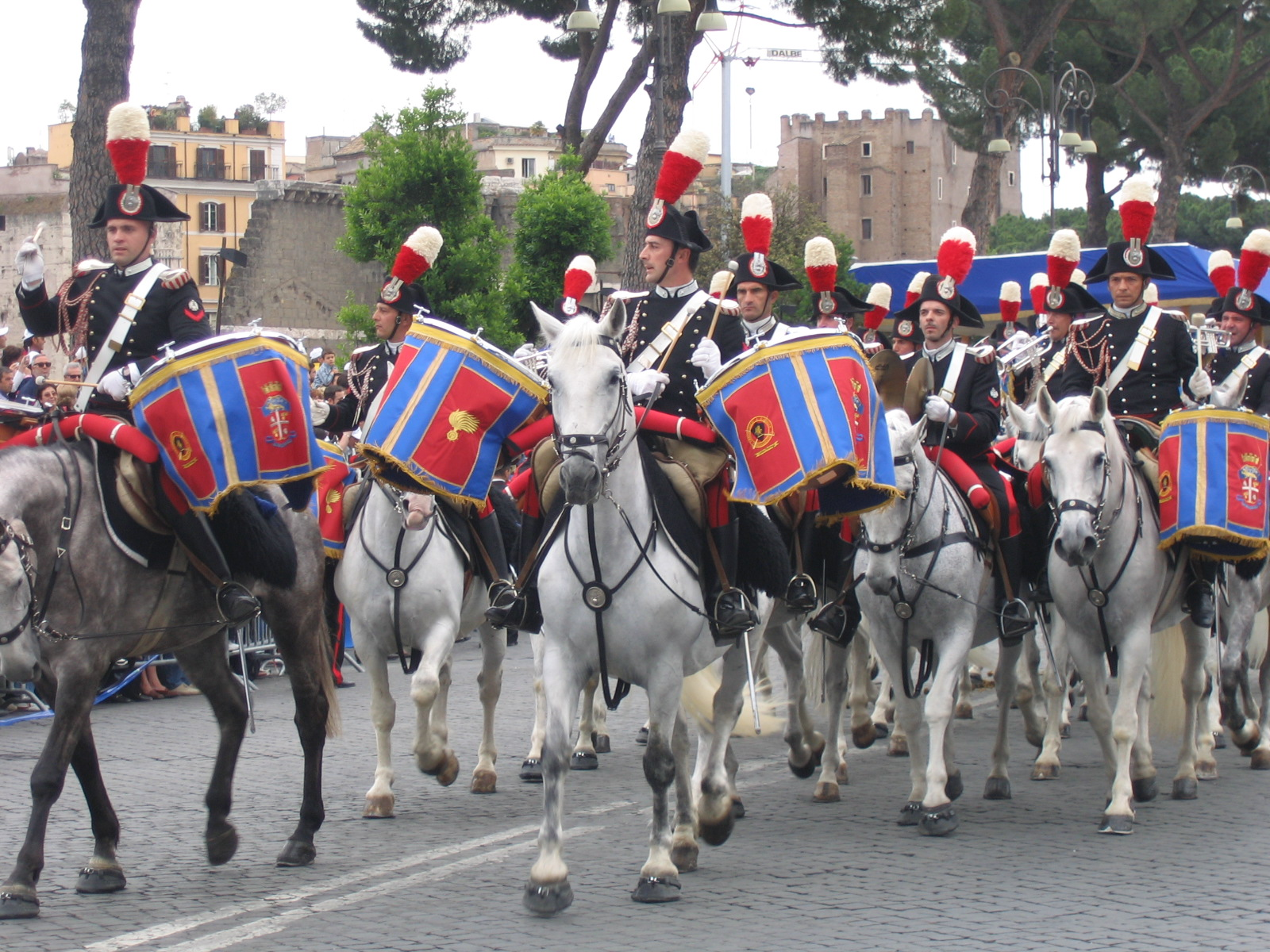
Mounted Carabinieri Band

- National Carabinieri Band
  - Fanfare Section
- Band of the Carabineri NCO School Rome
- Band of the Carabineri Basic School Turin
- Band of the Warrant Officers’ School (Florence)
- Band of the “Lombardy” Battalion (Milan)
- Band of the “Campania” Battalion (Naples)
- Band of the “Sicily” Battalion (Palermo)
- Mounted Carabinieri Band of the Carabinieri (4th) Cavalry Regiment

== Gallery ==
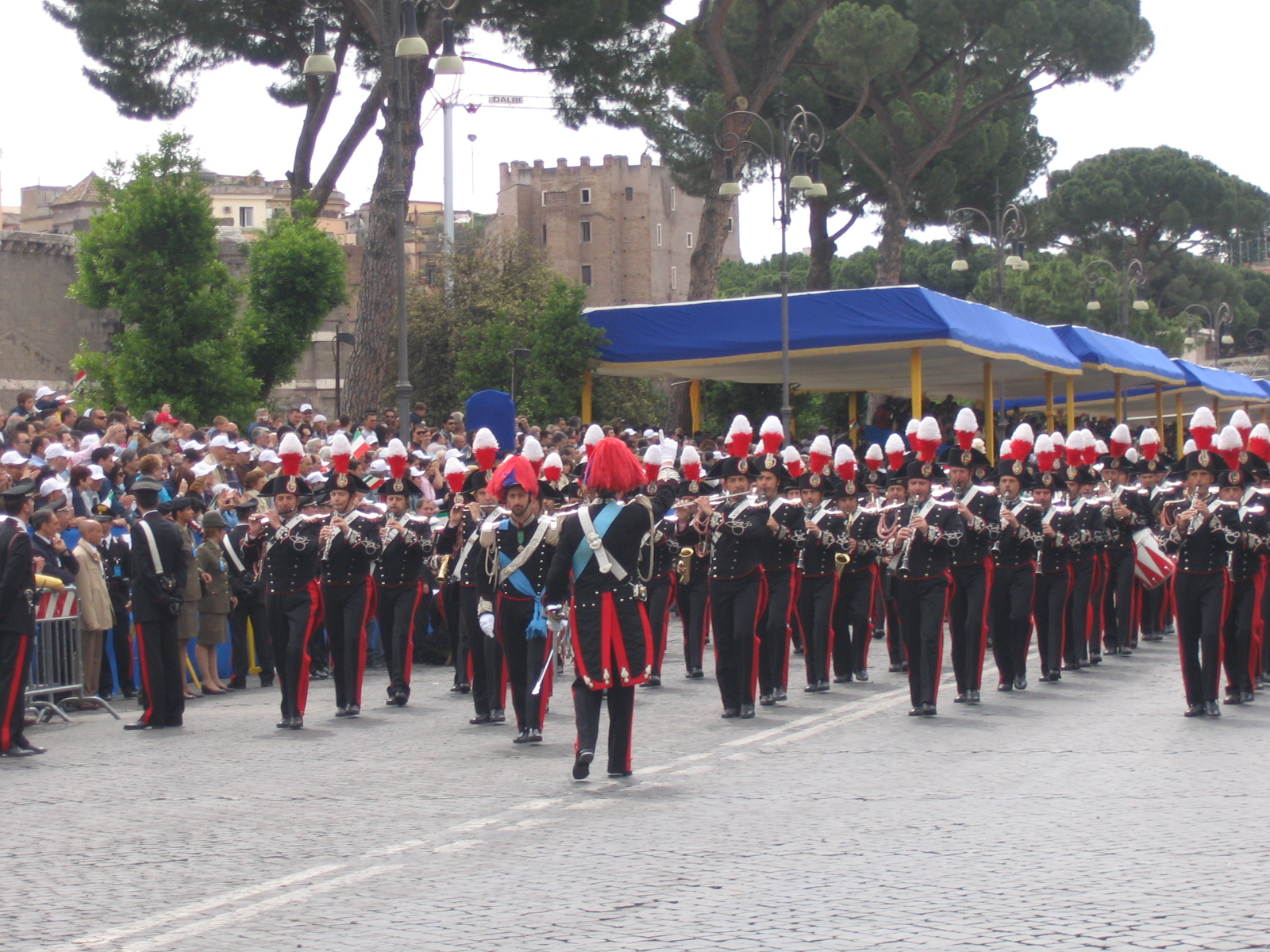

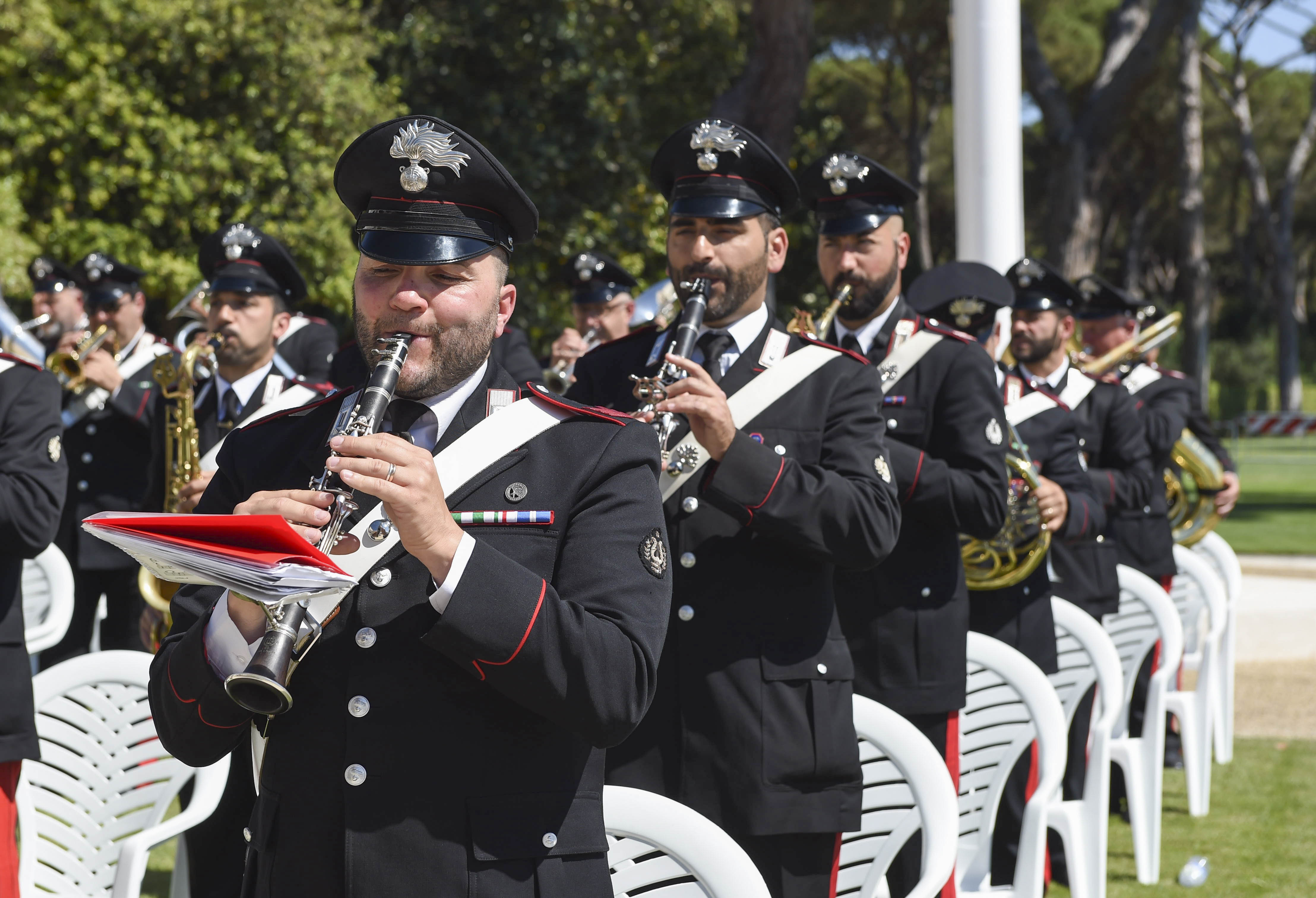
Fanfare band
