= Carabinieri Specialist Units Division =

- Divisione Unità Specializzate Carabinieri
- Active: 1 February 2001-present
- Country: Italy
- Branch: Carabinieri
- Type: Gendarmerie
- Role: Specialist police
- Part of: Specialists and Mobile Units Command
- Garrison/HQ: Rome

Commanders
- Current commander: Gen. D. Claudio Vincelli

The Carabinieri Specialist Units Division (Italian: Divisione Unità Specializzate Carabinieri) is the Carabinieri formation, established in 2001, dedicated to the performance of specialist police activities and the support to Territorial Organization and consisting of highly qualified personnel working with Ministries for the safeguard of socially sensitive issues.

The Division, which directly depends on the Mobile and Specialists Units Command "Palidoro", directs, controls, and coordinates its own units, which carry out tasks related to the protection of Italian artistic heritage, to the currency protection, to the protection of Italian embassies abroad, to the health protection, to the labour policing, to Bank of Italy needs, to the Carabinieri forensics police services. In addition, the Division provides Carabinieri air support.

== History ==
The Division tracks its origins back to the XII Carabinieri Brigade, which until 2001 grouped the specialist police units of the Carabinieri. On 1 February 2001, with the elevation of the Carabinieri to the rank of autonomous Armed Force (i.e. with an equal status to the Army, Navy and Air Force), the XII Brigate was elevated to the rank of Division.

In 2016, due to the merger of the State Forestry Corps into the Carabinieri, the Carabinieri Command of Units for Forestry Environmental and Agri-food protection was established. Therefore, some units until then subordinated to the Carabinieri Specialist Units Division were transferred to the newly-established command: the Carabinieri Command for Environmental Protection (Comando Carabinieri per la Tutela dell’Ambiente) and the Carabinieri Command for Agricultural and Food Policies (Comando Carabinieri Politiche Agricole e Alimentari).

Europol provides this summary of the "Specialized Commands'" role: "responsible for safeguarding the primary interests of the community: from the protection of the environment, health, work and national cultural heritage, to the observance of community and agri-food regulations, to the suppression of forgery [of] currency".

== Subordinate units ==
The Carabinieri Specialist Units Division controls seven Carabinieri units and commands tasked with carrying out specialist police services. These units are:

- Carabinieri Health Protection Command (Comando Carabinieri per la Tutela della Salute)
  - three groups (HQs) in Rome, Milan, and Naples
  - one operational unit in Rome
  - 38 teams in Aosta, Turin, Alessandria, Genoa, Milan, Cremona, Brescia, Trento, Udine, Treviso, Padua, Parma, Bologna, Florence, Ancona, Livorno, Perugia, Viterbo, Rome, Latina, Caserta, Sassari, Cagliari, Pescara, Foggia, Campobasso, Naples, Salerno, Potenza, Bari, Taranto, Lecce, Cosenza, Catanzaro, Reggio Calabria, Palermo, Catania, and Ragusa
- Carabinieri Cultural Heritage Protection Command (Comando Carabinieri per la Tutela del Patrimonio Culturale), in Rome
  - one group (HQ) in Rome
  - one operational unit in Rome
  - 15 teams in Ancona, Bari, Bologna, Cagliari, Cosenza, Florence, Genoa, Monza, Naples, Palermo, Perugia, Rome, Turin, Udine, and Venice
  - one TPC Section in Syracuse
- Carabinieri Labour Protection Command (Comando Carabinieri per la Tutela del Lavoro)
  - five groups (HQs) in Rome, Milan, Naples, Venice and Palermo
  - 101 teams in each provincial capital (with the exception of the two autonomous provinces of South Tyrol and Trentino)
- Carabinieri Bank of Italy Command (Comando Carabinieri Banca d’Italia)
  - one escort unit
  - three inspectorates
  - one company and 36 teams in provincial capitals, where the Bank of Italy is present
- Carabinieri Monetary Anti-counterfeiting Command (Comando Carabinieri Antifalsificazione Monetaria)
- Carabinieri Forestry, environmental and agri-food units Command (Comando unità forestali, ambientali e agroalimentari)
- Carabinieri Airmobile Groupment (Raggruppamento Aeromobili Carabinieri)
  - Flight Group
    - one airplane flight and two helicopter flights based at Pratica di Mare Air Base and Roma-Urbe Airport
  - 16 helicopters flights at air bases and airports in: Volpiano, Orio al Serio, Bolzano, Pisa San Giusto, Pescara, Bari, Pontecagnano, Vibo Valentia, Palermo, Olbia, Cagliari–Elmas, Catania-Fontanarossa, Forlì, Belluno, Villanova d’Albenga, and Rieti
- Carabinieri Forensic Investigations Groupment (Raggruppamento Carabinieri Investigazioni Scientifiche)
  - four forensic units in Parma, Rome, Cagliari and Messina
  - 22 sections
