= Carabinieri =

Italian gendarmerie

Carabinieri Arma dei Carabinieri
- Emblem

- Heraldic achievement

- Flag
- Motto: Nei Secoli Fedele; Faithful through the centuries

Agency overview
- Formed: 13 July 1814; 212 years ago

Jurisdictional structure
- National agency: Italy
- Operations jurisdiction: Italy
- General nature: Gendarmerie

Operational structure
- Headquarters: Rome
- Sworn members: 110,000 officers
- Elected officers responsible: Guido Crosetto, Minister of Defence; Matteo Piantedosi, Minister of the Interior
- Agency executive: General Salvatore Luongo, Commander General
- Parent agency: Ministry of Defence; Ministry of the Interior

Notables
- Anniversary: 5 June, Carabinieri Day

Website
- www.carabinieri.it

The Carabinieri (Note: /ˌkærəbɪnˈjɛəri/, also US: /ˌkɑːr-/, Italian: [karabiˈnjɛːri]; formally Arma dei Carabinieri, "Arm of Carabineers"; previously Corpo dei Carabinieri Reali, "Royal Carabineers Corps") are the national gendarmerie of Italy who primarily carry out domestic and foreign policing duties. It is one of Italy's main law enforcement agencies, alongside the Polizia di Stato and the Guardia di Finanza. As with the Guardia di Finanza but in contrast to the Polizia di Stato, the Carabinieri are a military force. As the fourth branch of the Italian Armed Forces, they come under the authority of the Ministry of Defence; for activities related to inland public order and security, they functionally depend on the Ministry of the Interior. In practice, there is a significant overlap between the jurisdiction of the Polizia di Stato and Carabinieri, and both of them are contactable through 112, the European Union's Single Emergency number. Unlike the Polizia di Stato, the Carabinieri have responsibility for policing the military, and a number of members regularly participate in military missions abroad.

They were originally founded as the police force of the Kingdom of Sardinia, the forerunner of the Kingdom of Italy. During the process of Italian unification, the Carabinieri were appointed as the "First Force" of the new national military organization. Although the Carabinieri assisted in the suppression of opposition during the rule of Benito Mussolini, they were also responsible for his downfall and many units were disbanded during World War II by Nazi Germany, which resulted in large numbers of Carabinieri joining the Italian resistance movement.

In 2000, they were separated from the Army to become a separate branch of the Italian Armed Forces. Carabinieri have policing powers that can be exercised at any time and in any part of the country, and they are always permitted to carry their assigned weapon as personal equipment (Beretta 92FS pistols).

The Carabinieri are often referred to as La Benemerita (The Reputable or The Meritorious) as they are a trusted and prestigious law enforcement institution in Italy. The first official account of the use of this term to refer to the Carabinieri dates back to 24 June 1864.

== History ==
=== Early history ===
Inspired by the French gendarmerie, the corps was created by King Victor Emmanuel I of Sardinia with the aim of providing the Savoyard state of the Kingdom of Sardinia with a police corps. After French soldiers had occupied Turin at the end of the 18th century and later abandoned it to the Kingdom of Sardinia, the Royal Carabinieri Corps was instituted under the Royal Patents of 13 July 1814. The name is derived from the French word carabinier, meaning "soldier armed with a carbine."

The new force was divided into divisions on the scale of one division for each province. The divisions were further divided into companies and subdivided into lieutenancies, which commanded and coordinated the local police stations and were distributed throughout the national territory in direct contact with the public.

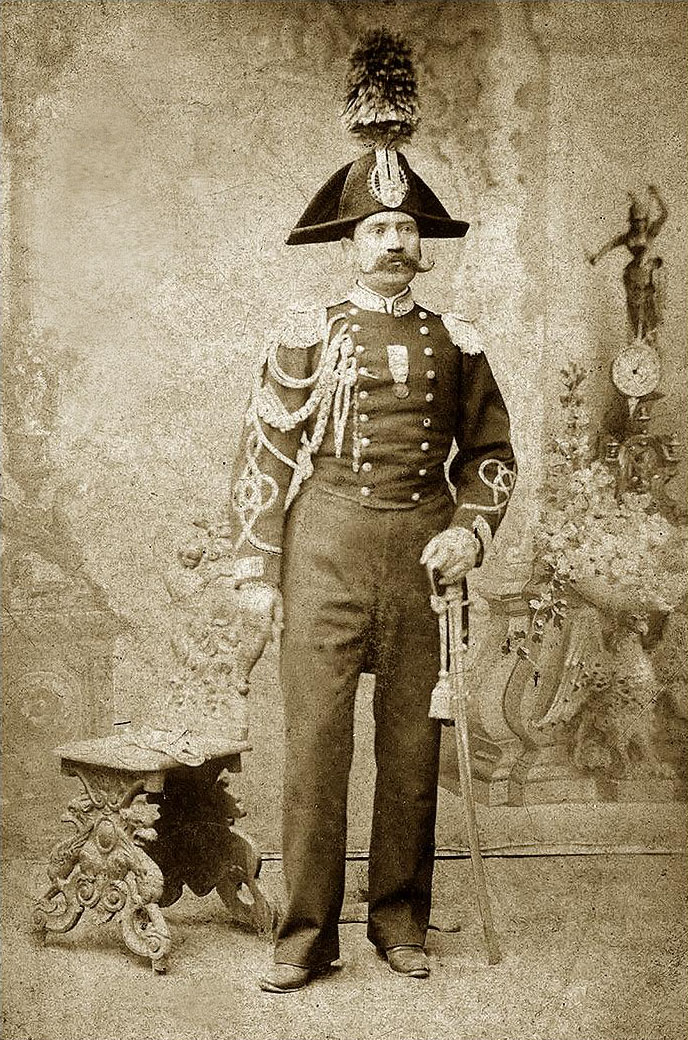
Photo of a carabiniere around 1875. The 'Medal of Italian Independence' is worn, indicating a veteran of the Risorgimento (The Wars for Italian Unification).

In 1868, the Cuirassiers Regiment or Corazzieri was formed, initially as a cavalry escort of honour for the sovereign, and since 1946 for the President of the Republic. The Italian unification saw the number of divisions increased, and on 24 January 1861, the Carabinieri were appointed the "First Force" of the new national military organization.

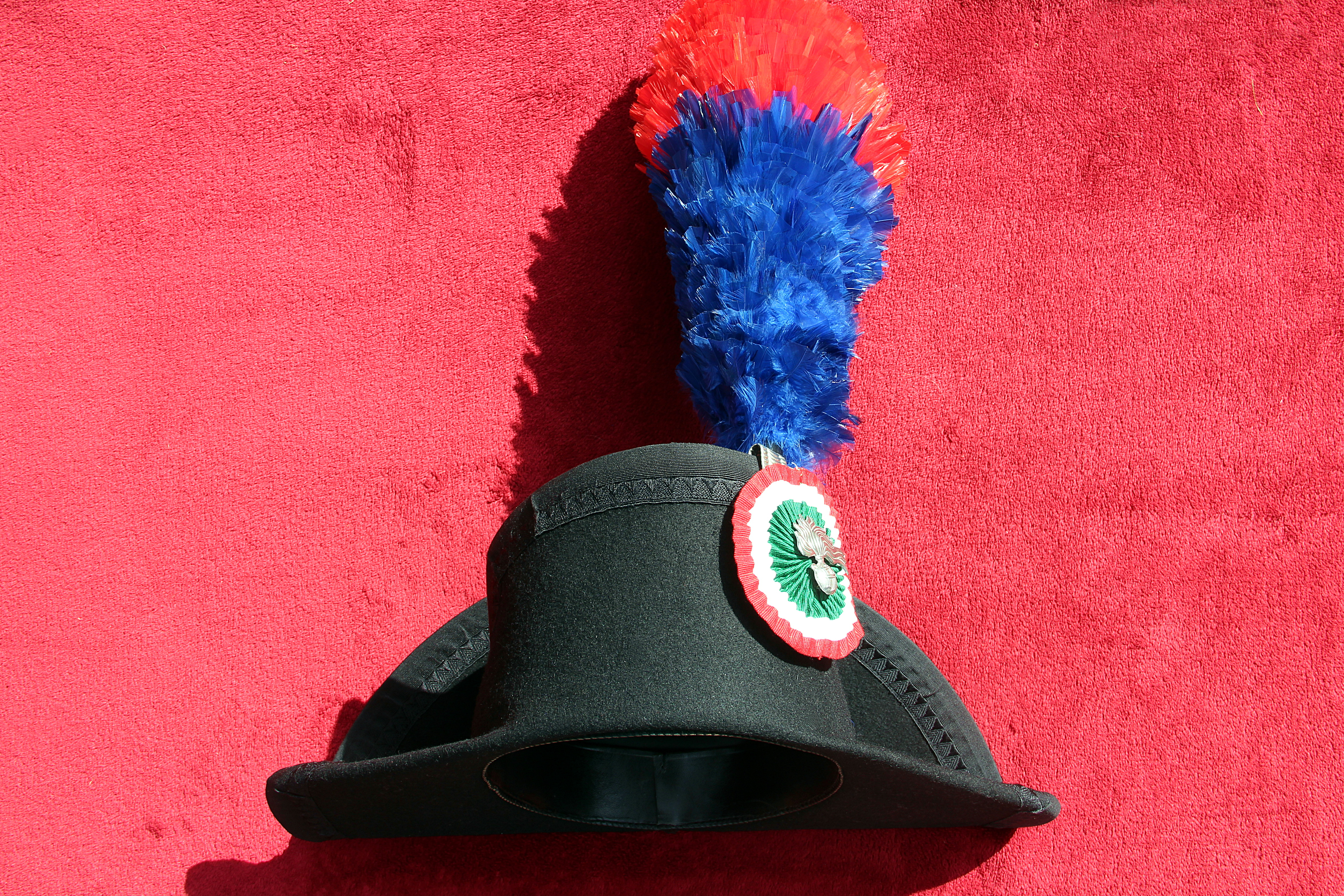
Carabinier's bicorne.

In May 1915, Italian troops marched to encompass South Tyrol, a territory of their former allies Austria-Hungary, in the Italian front . The defenders had sufficient time to prepare strong fortifications there, and at the Karst Plateau to the east. The Italians, under the overall command of General Luigi Cadorna, found themselves repeatedly repulsed in harsh fighting. The role of the Carabinieri was to act as barrier troops, setting up machine gun posts to control the rear of the attacking regiments and prevent desertion.

=== 1930s and 1940s ===
During Fascist Italy (1922–1943) under Benito Mussolini, the Carabinieri were one of the police forces entrusted with suppressing opposition in Italy. During the same period, while part of the Italian African Police (mainly in the late 1930s), they were involved in atrocities in colonial Italian East Africa during the Second Italo-Ethiopian War. During World War II, they fought in their function as military police against the Allied forces, and against Yugoslav Partisans as part of the Italian occupation force of the Kingdom of Yugoslavia.

After the fall of the Fascist regime in Italy on 25 July 1943, on the orders of the king, Mussolini was arrested by the Carabinieri as he left the king's private residence in Rome and subsequently imprisoned on Campo Imperatore by Carabinieri forces. After the armistice between Italy and Allied armed forces on 3 September 1943 and the country's split into the fascist Italian Social Republic in the north and the Kingdom of Italy in the south, the Carabinieri split into two groups.

In the Kingdom of Italy, the Carabinieri Command for Liberated Italy was founded in Bari, mobilizing new units for the Italian war of liberation. These units were attached to the Italian Liberation Corps and the six Italian Combat Groups of the Italian Co-Belligerent Army, fighting with the Allied forces.

In the fascist Social Republic in the North, the regime organized the National Republican Guard (composed of Carabinieri, former officers from the Italian African Police, Guardia di Finanza and customs police), to employ it as a military police and rapid-deployment anti-guerrilla force. GNR was later joined (but not taken over) by the Black Brigades, which represented a new militant incarnation of the Fascist party.

Due to the role the Carabinieri had played in the downfall of Mussolini, and since one of the few units which fought the German occupation of Rome were the Granatieri di Sardegna Mechanized Brigade regiments and the II Carabinieri cadet battalion, the Germans did not view the Carabinieri as loyal to the fascist cause. They disarmed the force and began the deportation of 8,000 officers to Germany for forced labour on 6 October 1943; the Italian Colonial Police took over their jobs.

Subsequently, large numbers of Carabinieri joined the Italian resistance movement to fight German and Italian fascists. Nonetheless, some 45,000 officers remained on the job and as of March 1944, this group was the only national security force in Italy.

After the war the Carabinieri counted at least 2735 fallen and 6500 wounded, out of approximately 14,000 who had joined the Resistance in northern and central Italy. In Yugoslavia, the Carabinieri formed a battalion of the Italian 182nd Armored Infantry Regiment "Garibaldi", which fought alongside the Yugoslav partisans against the Wehrmacht and the Croatian Ustaše. The battalion lost over 80% of its members in combat and was awarded the Silver Medal of Military Valor to commemorate the fallen.

One notable act of heroism in this era came from Vice Brigadiere Salvo D'Acquisto, who was executed by Nazi Germany in Palidoro (near Rome) during World War II. D'Acquisto exchanged his life for the lives of citizens due to be executed in retaliation for the killing of a German soldier; instead, he claimed responsibility and was executed for the offence.

=== Present day ===
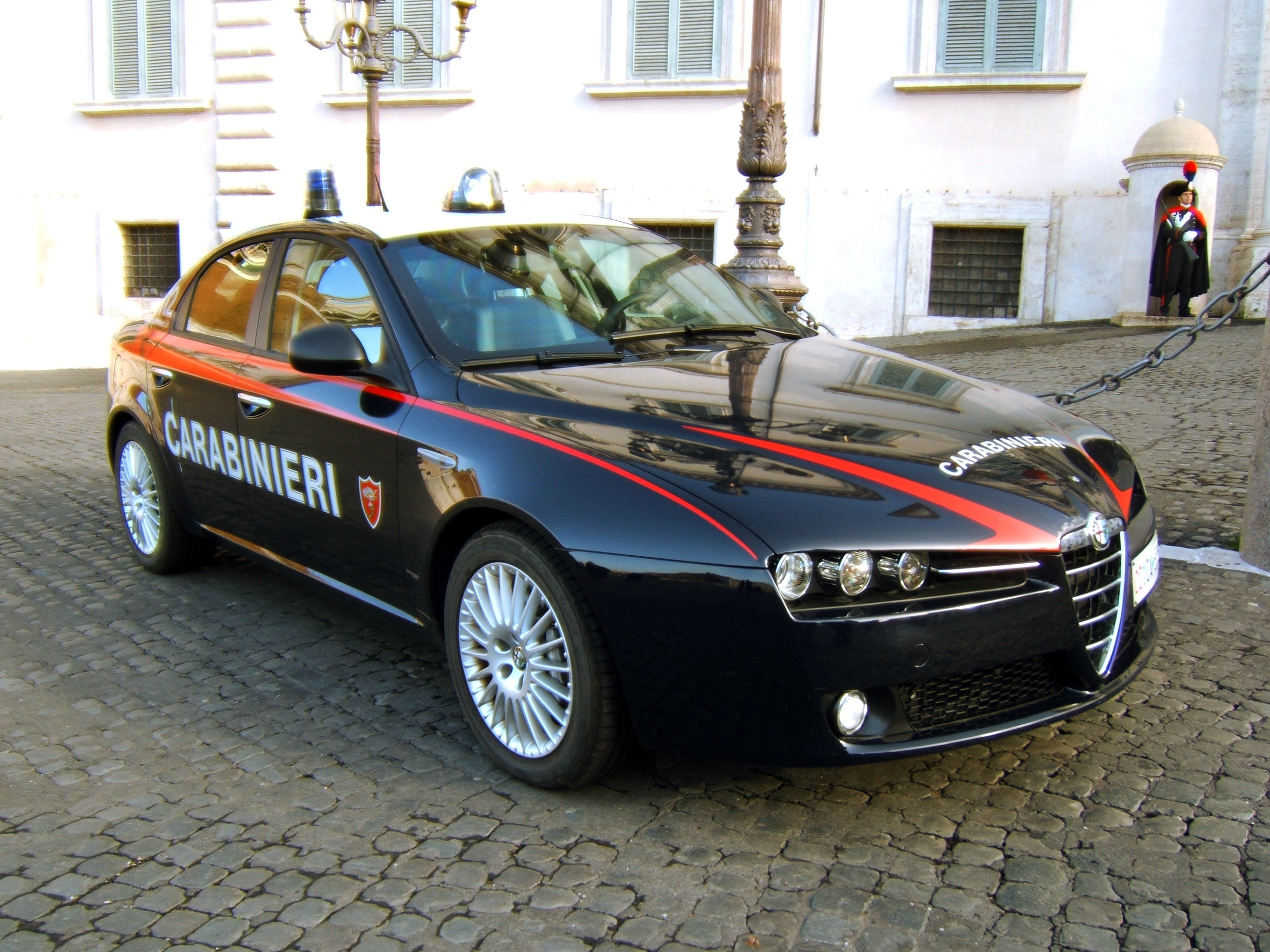
Alfa Romeo 159

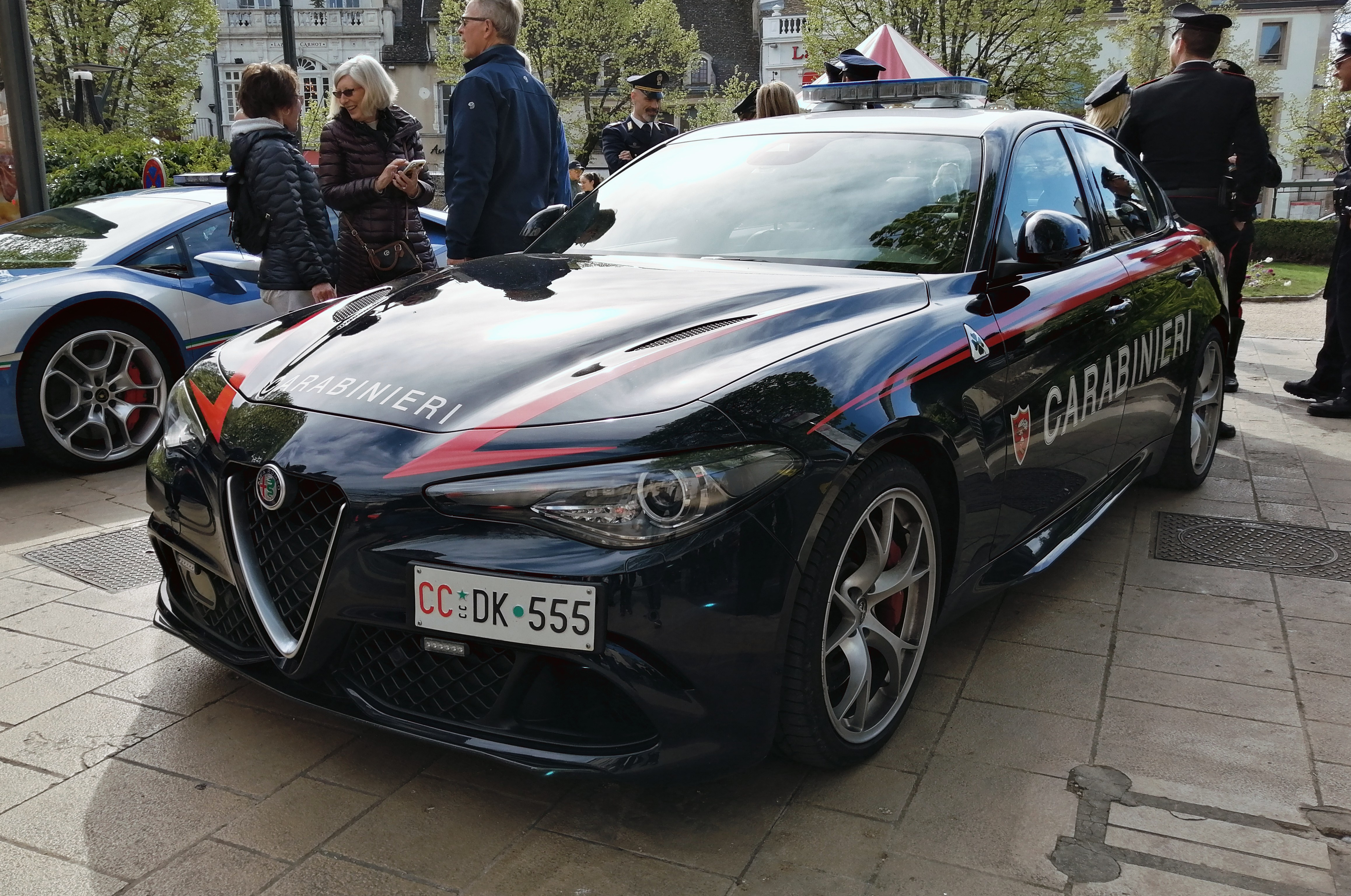
Alfa Romeo Giulia Quadrifoglio Carabinieri

The Carabinieri were in the forefront of many internal conflicts in Italy in the late 20th century, such as the Years of Lead (against the Red Brigades) and the Second Mafia War (against the Corleonesi Mafia). They participated, and lost men, in events such as the Peteano massacre in 1972, Circonvallazione massacre in 1982, and the murder of Emanuele Basile. Until 2000, the Carabinieri were part of the Italian Army. On 31 March 2000, they were separated to become the fourth branch of the Italian Armed Forces. Interpol summarizes this force (part of the Ministry of Defence) as having a "nationwide remit for crime investigations. It also serves as the military police for the Italian armed forces and can be called upon for national defence action."

According to Europol (the EU's law enforcement agency), the Carabinieri Corps' military duties include "contributing to national defence, participating in military operations in Italy and abroad, executing military police functions and ensuring the security of Italian diplomatic and consular representations". As a national police force, it "carries out public order and security policing, as well as investigative activities on its own initiative or at the request of the judicial authorities". Europol also states that the force is "supplemented by the Specialized Carabinieri Commands, responsible for safeguarding the primary interests of the community: from the protection of the environment, health, work and national cultural heritage, to the observance of community and agri-food regulations, to the suppression of forgery [of] currency".

In recent years Carabinieri units have been dispatched on peacekeeping missions, including Kosovo, Afghanistan, and Iraq. In 2003, 12 Carabinieri were killed in a suicide bombing on their base in Nasiriyah, near Basra in southern Iraq, in the largest Italian military loss of life in a single action since the Second World War. One of the previous projects included training and assisting the Afghan National Security Forces, the Afghan National Police, and the Afghan National Civil Order Police. In Iraq, Carabinieri have trained 13,000 police officers; during the ISIS destruction of historic sites, Italy dispatched troops from the Carabinieri's Command to protect cultural heritage.

At the Sea Island Conference of the G8 in 2004, Carabinieri were given a mandate to establish a Centre of Excellence for Stability Police Units to spearhead the development of training and doctrinal standards for civilian police units attached to international peacekeeping missions.

The State Forestry Corps was dissolved on 31 December 2016 and personnel with forestry police function were militarized and absorbed by the Carabinieri.

== Organization ==
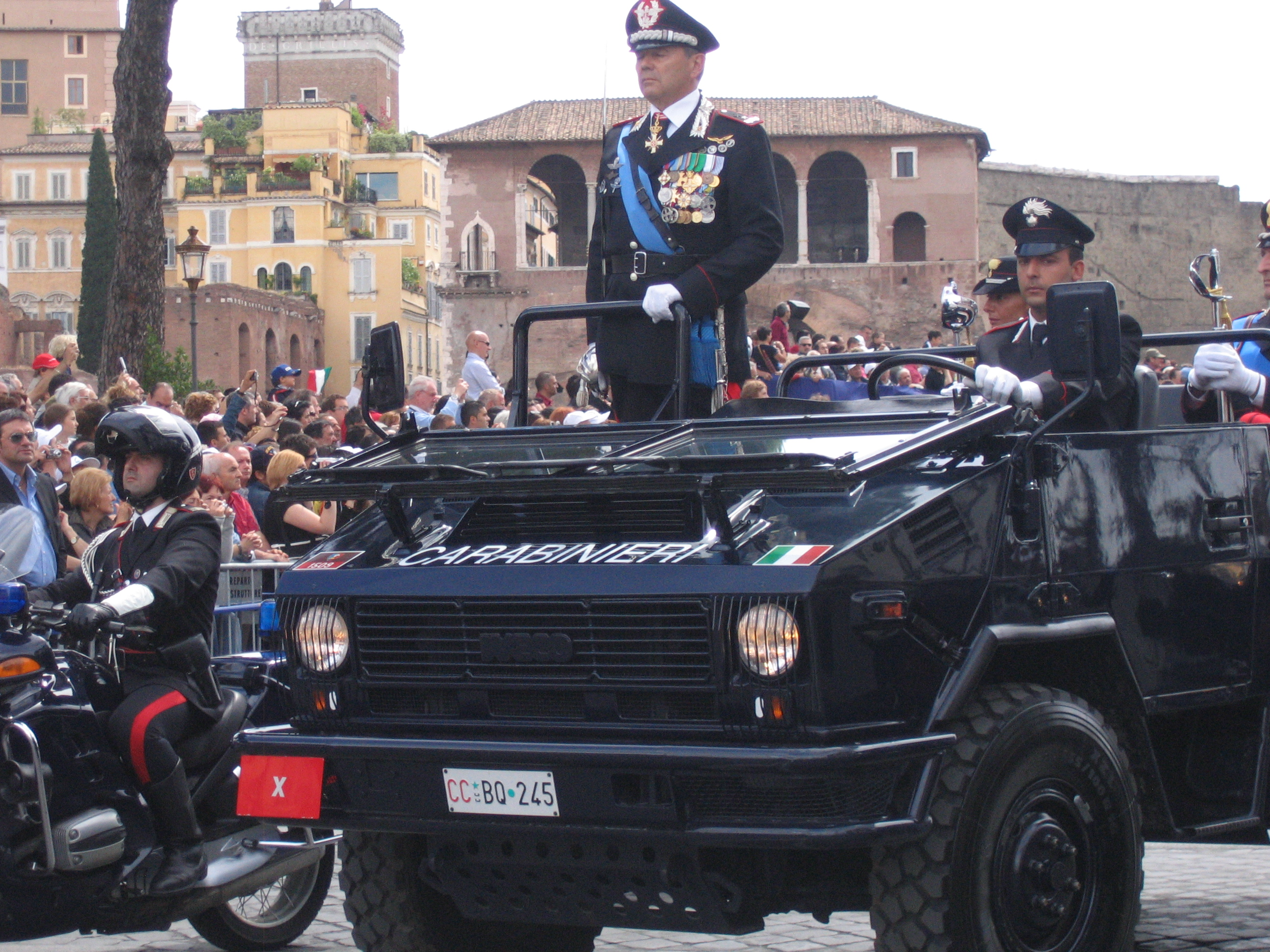
Senior Carabinieri General in a VM 90 during the 2007 Republic Day parade in Italy

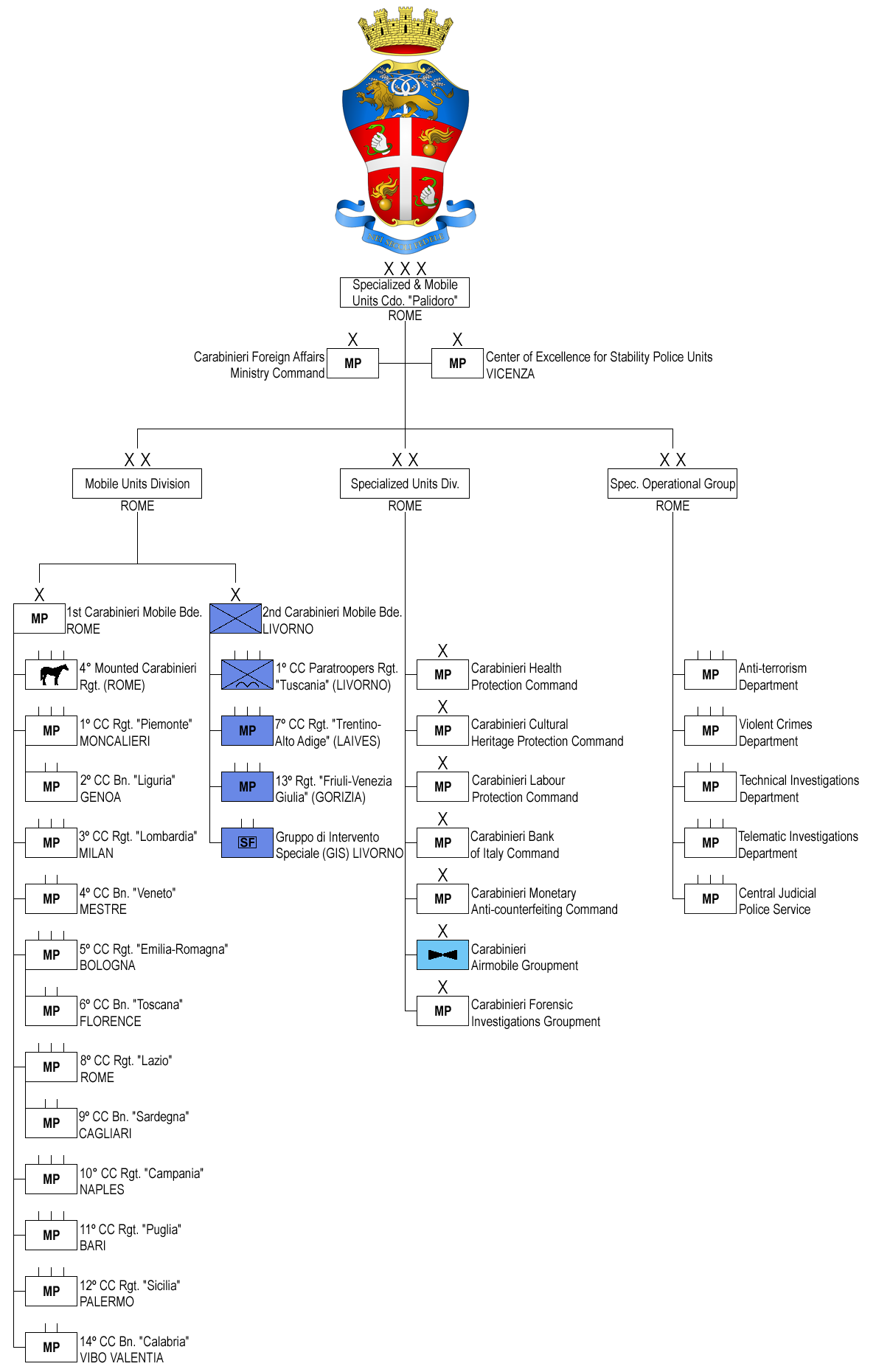
Structure of the Specialist & Mobile Units Command

The corps is headed by the Comando, consisting of the Comandante Generale (a General), the Vice-Comandante Generale (a Lieutenant General) and the Chief of Staff, all located in Rome. The Chief of Staff directs, coordinates and supervises all activities of the force. It directly supervises the Directors of Administration, Health, Engineering, the motor pool and the Veterinary Commission. On the Deputy Chiefs of Staff depend the National Center for Recruitment and Selection, the Administration National Center and the Legislation Office.

=== Territorial Organization ===
The Carabinieri are organised on a territorial basis for law-enforcement missions. The territorial organization represents the core of the institution; it contains 80 percent of the force and is organized hierarchically in five inter-regional commands, 19 regional commands and 102 provincial commands, 504 Company Commands and 4,672 Station Commands and lieutenancies.

The territorial organization includes four heliborne units:

- Carabinieri Heliborne Squadron "Cacciatori di Calabria", responsible for operations in Calabria
- Carabinieri Heliborne Squadron "Cacciatori di Sicilia", responsible for operations in Sicily
- Carabinieri Heliborne Squadron "Cacciatori di Sardegna", responsible for operations in Sardinia
- Carabinieri Heliborne Squadron "Cacciatori di Puglia", responsible for operations in Apulia

=== Specialist and Mobile Units Command Organization ===
Outside the territorial organisation, the Specialist and Mobile Units Command Palidoro (Comando delle Unità Mobili e Specializzate "Palidoro", based in Rome) controls the Carabinieri Mobile Units Division, the Carabinieri Specialist Units Division and the ROS.

==== Carabinieri Specialist Units Division ====
The Carabinieri Specialist Units Division is a Carabinieri formation, established in 2001, dedicated to the performance of specialist police activities and support of Territorial Organizations. The Division directs, controls, and coordinates its own units, which carry out tasks related to the protection of Italian artistic heritage; currency protection; the protection of Italian embassies abroad; health protection; labour policing; Bank of Italy needs; and the Carabinieri forensics police services. In addition, the Division provides Carabinieri air support.

==== Mobile Units Division ====
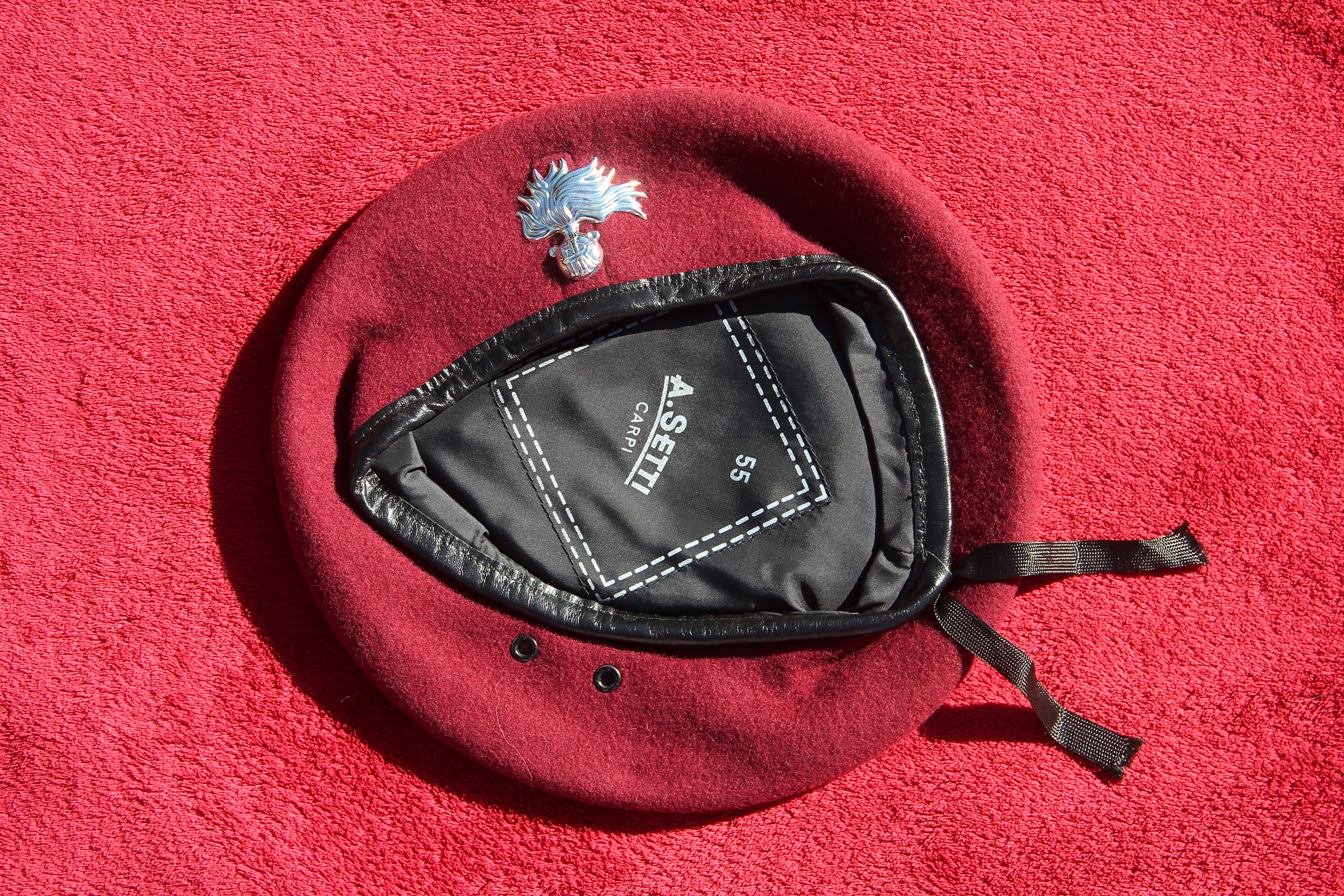
Paratrooper Carabinieri beret.

The Carabinieri Mobile Units Division is located in Rome and has two brigades tasked with mass manoeuvres during emergencies, defending the nation and participating in military operations abroad. It supports public order and territorial control in urban areas, and contributes to the operations of civil authorities in terms of public safety. 1st Mobile Brigade, whose headquarters is located in Rome and includes six Regiments and four Battalions mainly employed in public order tasks. 2nd Mobile Brigade headquartered in Livorno includes the Gruppo di Intervento Speciale special forces group, the 1st Paratroopers Carabinieri Regiment "Tuscania", and the 7th "Trentino-Alto Adige" and 13th "Friuli-Venezia Giulia" regiments, which, together with the Multinational Specialized Unit, are mainly engaged in international missions.

==== Special forces ====
The Gruppo di Intervento Speciale is one of the seven Italian special forces.

==== ROS ====
The ROS (Raggruppamento Operativo Speciale or Special Operational Group) is an elite unit founded in 1990 to deal with organised crime (Mafia and others), subversive activities, terrorism and more complex types of crime. An anti-crime section is found in every city and district public prosecutor's office.

==== Special Tasks Departments ====
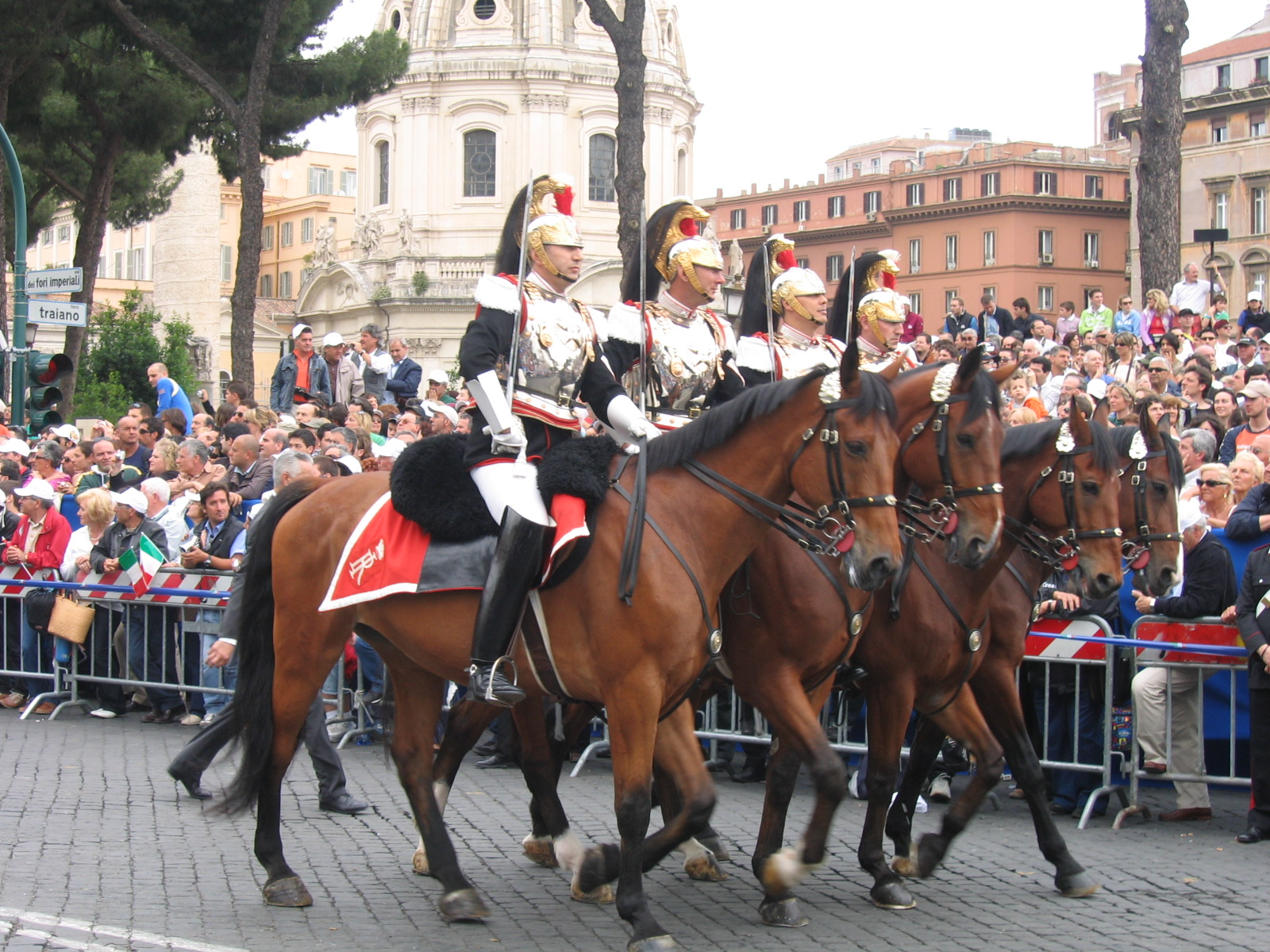
Corazzieri

Special Tasks Departments are outside the ordinary organisational framework and are used for special missions: Corazzieri (Cuirassiers) are an elite corps and honour guard of the President of the Italian Republic, located in the Quirinal Palace. They are distinguished by their uniforms and height (the minimum height for admission is 1.9 m or 6 ft 3 in). They have almost no other everyday duties, although they may be seen patrolling occasionally.

Other departments are in service to constitutional bodies such as, the Presidency of the Republic, the Senate, Parliament, the Judiciary, the prime minister and the National Council of Economy and Labour. Carabinieri also perform military police and security duties for the Ministry of Defence, military high commands, the offices of the military judiciary and allied military organisations in Italy and abroad. They also have personnel attached to the Department of Public Security in various departments, as well as anti-Mafia and anti-drug investigative task forces. Carabinieri officers are charged with surveillance and security at Italian embassies and consulates abroad, performing the same services entrusted to the Marine Corps Embassy Security Group in United States diplomatic and consular offices.

Together with the Polizia di Stato and the Guardia di Finanza, the Carabinieri is also responsible for border control.

==== Command Unit for environmental, agri-food and forestry protection ====
The specialized Comando unità per la tutela forestale, ambientale, e agroalimentare has its headquarters in Rome, and 15 regional commands and approximately 700 Station Commands around the country, with 7,000 personnel. Its missions are preventing production and distribution of illicit agri-foodstuffs, environmental and biodiversity protection, prevention of poaching, and suppression of all criminal organizations that, with their activity, affect the environment. In the Unit, there are also 29 NOEs (Nucleo Operativo Ecologico), teams highly specialized in complex investigations in environmental matters against organized crime.

== War service ==
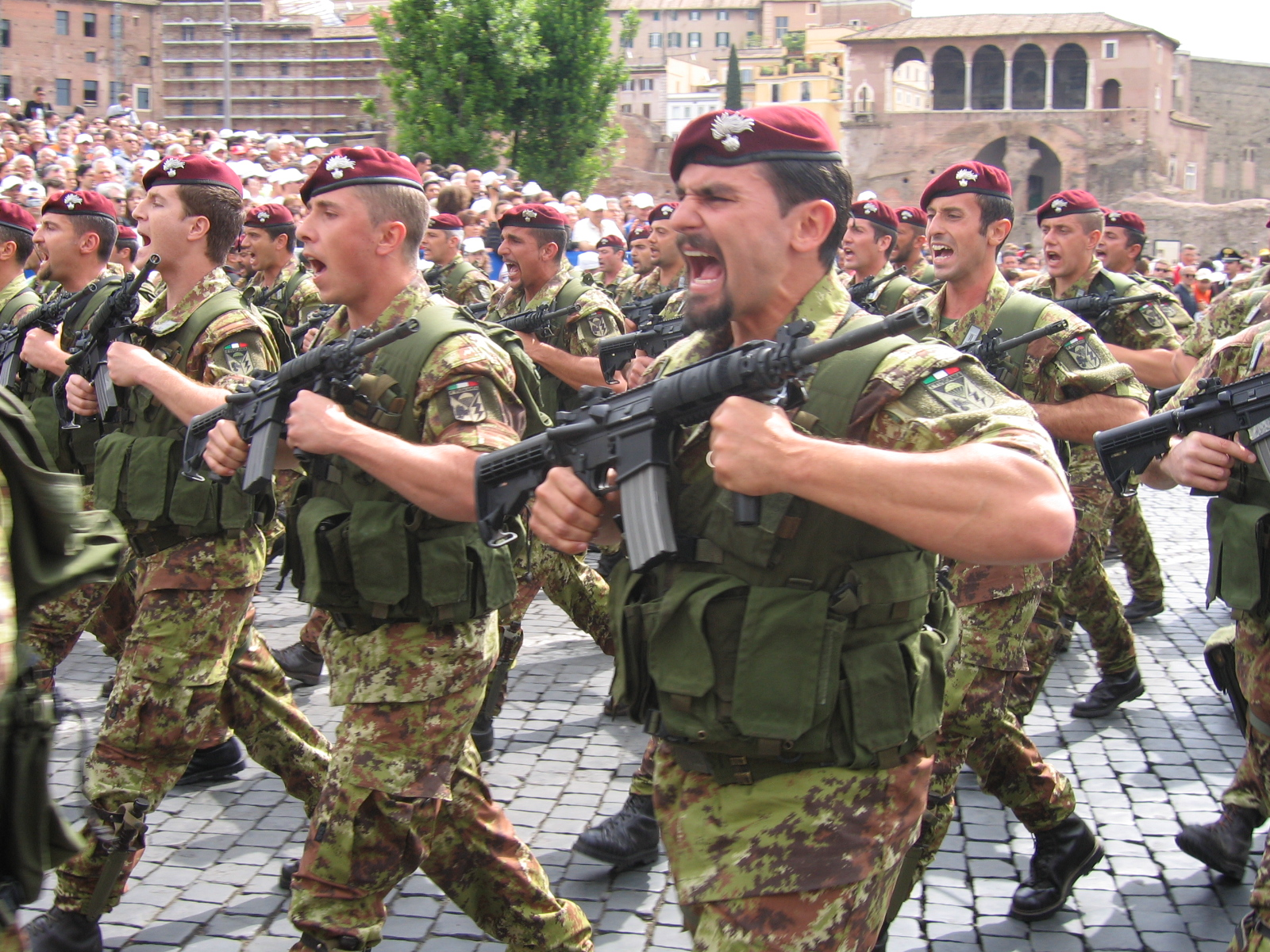
1st Paratroopers Carabinieri Regiment "Tuscania"

The main battles in which the Carabinieri took part before World War I are:

- Grenoble, 5 July 1815, part of the Napoleonic Wars
- Battle of Pastrengo, 30 April 1848 – the Carabinieri Corps was awarded its first Silver Medal of Military Valor
- Battle of Santa Lucia, 6 May 1848 – the Carabinieri Corps was awarded its first Bronze Medal of Military Valor
- Battle of Custoza, 24–25 July 1848
- Battle of Custoza, 24 June 1866
- Capture of Rome, 20 September 1870 (together with the Bersaglieri)

For its contributions during the First World War, the Corps was awarded its first Gold Medal of Military Valor

In World War II, Carabinieri fought in the following battles:

- Battle of Klisoura on the Greek-Albanian front from 16 to 30 December 1940 Bronze Medal of Military Valor
- Battle at Cafe Struga on the Albanian-Yugoslav front on 18 April 1941
- Battle of Culqualber (Ethiopia), 6 August-21 November 1941 – Corps was awarded its second Gold Medal of Military Valor

From 1943 to 1945, the Carabinieri were accountable to the Control Commission of the Allied Military Government (AMGOT). Their reorganization and reform was organized by Colonel Arthur Young, a British police officer seconded as Director of Public Safety and Director of Security.

The carabinieri were instrumental during the troubling years that made up the Italian Years of Lead (1968-1988):

- Peteano massacre (31 May 1972)
- Reggio revolt (5 July 1970 – 23 February 1971)
- Kidnapping and murder of Aldo Moro (16 March 1978 – 9 May 1978)

During the Sicilian Mafia wars, mainly the First Mafia War (1962-1963) and the Second Mafia War (1981-1983), the carabinieri were present to combat organized crime and maintain order. Two prominent carabinieri officers, Emanuele Basile and Carlo Alberto dalla Chiesa were killed by the Corleonesi mafia. Other battles between the carabinieri and the mafia included:

- Ciaculli massacre (30 June 1963)
- Circonvallazione massacre (16 June 1982)
- Via D'Amelio bombing (19 July 1992)

== Uniforms ==
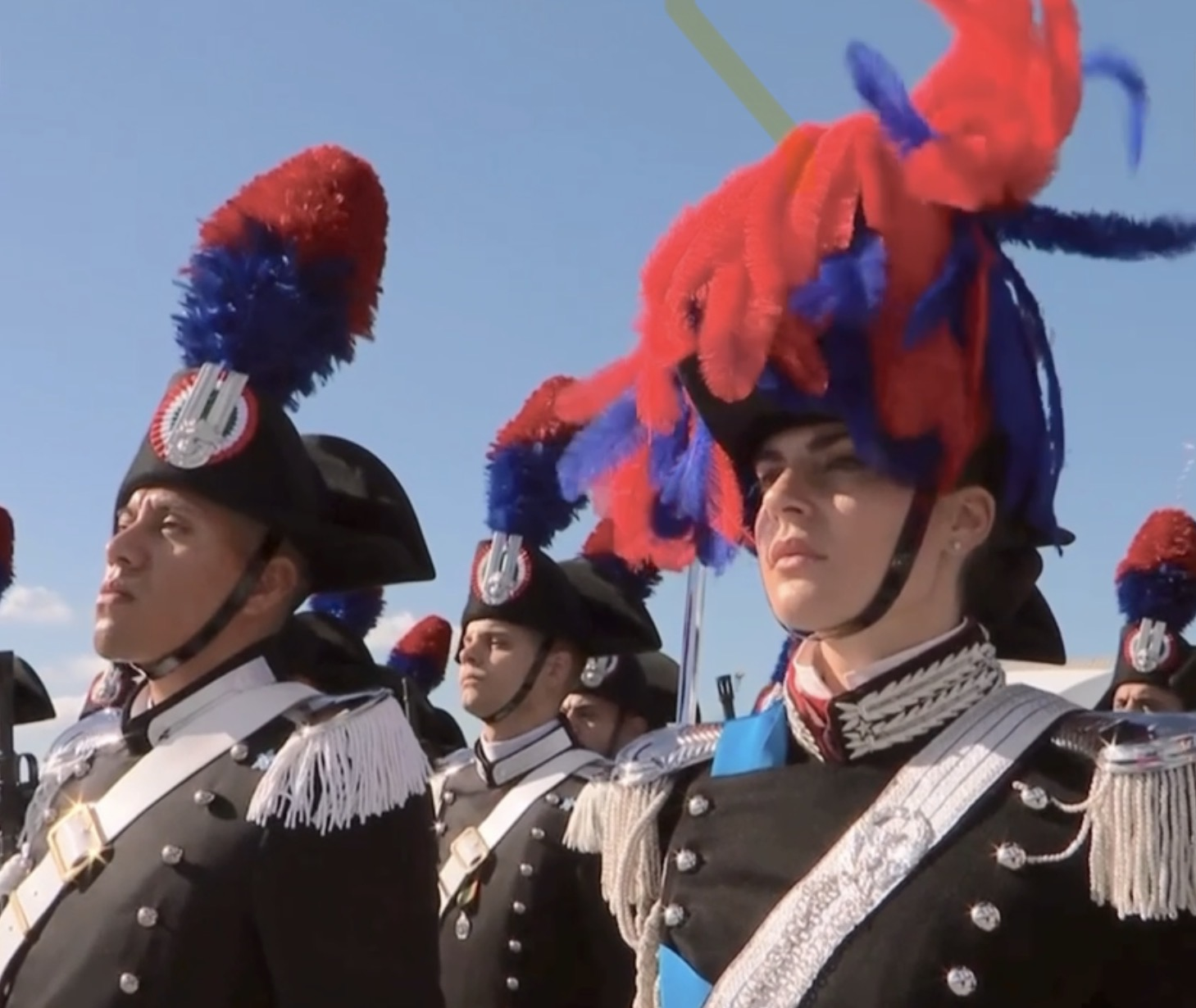
Dress uniform of Carabinieri on parade.

The Carabinieri, as a military and police force, have various uniforms for different functions. For each type of uniform there are seasonal variants and (except for service, combat and historical) versions for men and women. How, when and why they are to be worn is dictated by the "R-11 "Regulation on Uniforms for the Carabinieri Arma" published by the Carabinieri General Command in 1988.

The uniforms of the Carabinieri are divided into:

1. historical and full dress
2. ordinary,
3. service,
4. representative, (for warrant officers, NCOs and constables)
5. Great Winter Uniform (GUI) / Great Summer Uniform (GUE) (for officers)
6. operational use
7. athletic gear

Those of service, representation and GUI/GUE are a derivation of the ordinary.

=== History ===
Originally, the Carabinieri were issued a distinctive uniform in black with silver braid around the collar and cuffs, edges trimmed in scarlet and epaulettes in silver. The mounted division had white fringes, and the infantry had light blue. Their headgear was a distinctive bicorne, popularly called the lucerna (in use only for historical uniform and ceremonies). They still use a version of the historic uniform today for ceremonies.

=== Design ===
The uniform that the Gendarmerie wore in 1814 consisted of a turquoise fabric buttoned suit with a blue collar and padded gloves. Since 1822, some small changes have been made to the uniform. Officials and Marshals had silver swords and sabres, both in a black leather scabbard. At the beginning of the 20th Century, the rules of the dress code were reinforced because of World War I.

Troopers had three different types of uniforms: the Complete uniform, the Ordinary uniform, and the Effort uniform. The Carabinieri's uniform at that time was made of a green-grey cloth material, and was used by all soldiers.

=== Historical and Ceremonial (Special) uniform ===
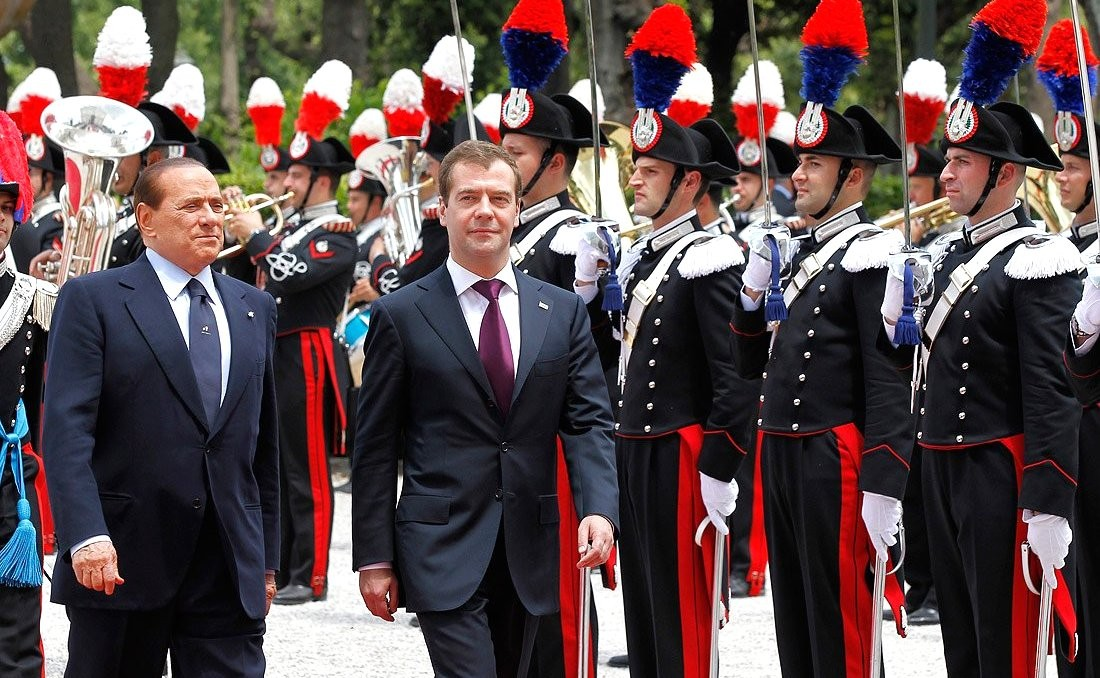
Ceremonial uniforms worn by the Carabinieri during a Russian state visit to Italy

For historical and ceremonial use, the Carabinieri uniform consists of a distinctive black uniform made of silver braids around the collar and cuffs, edges trimmed in scarlet and epaulettes in silver. The fringes of the mounted division are white, and the infantry has light blue. The headgear used is the traditional two-pointed hat for Carabinieri, known as the Lucerna, also called a bicorne.

During the 1980s Giorgio Armani designed the new more modern uniforms.

=== Ordinary uniform ===
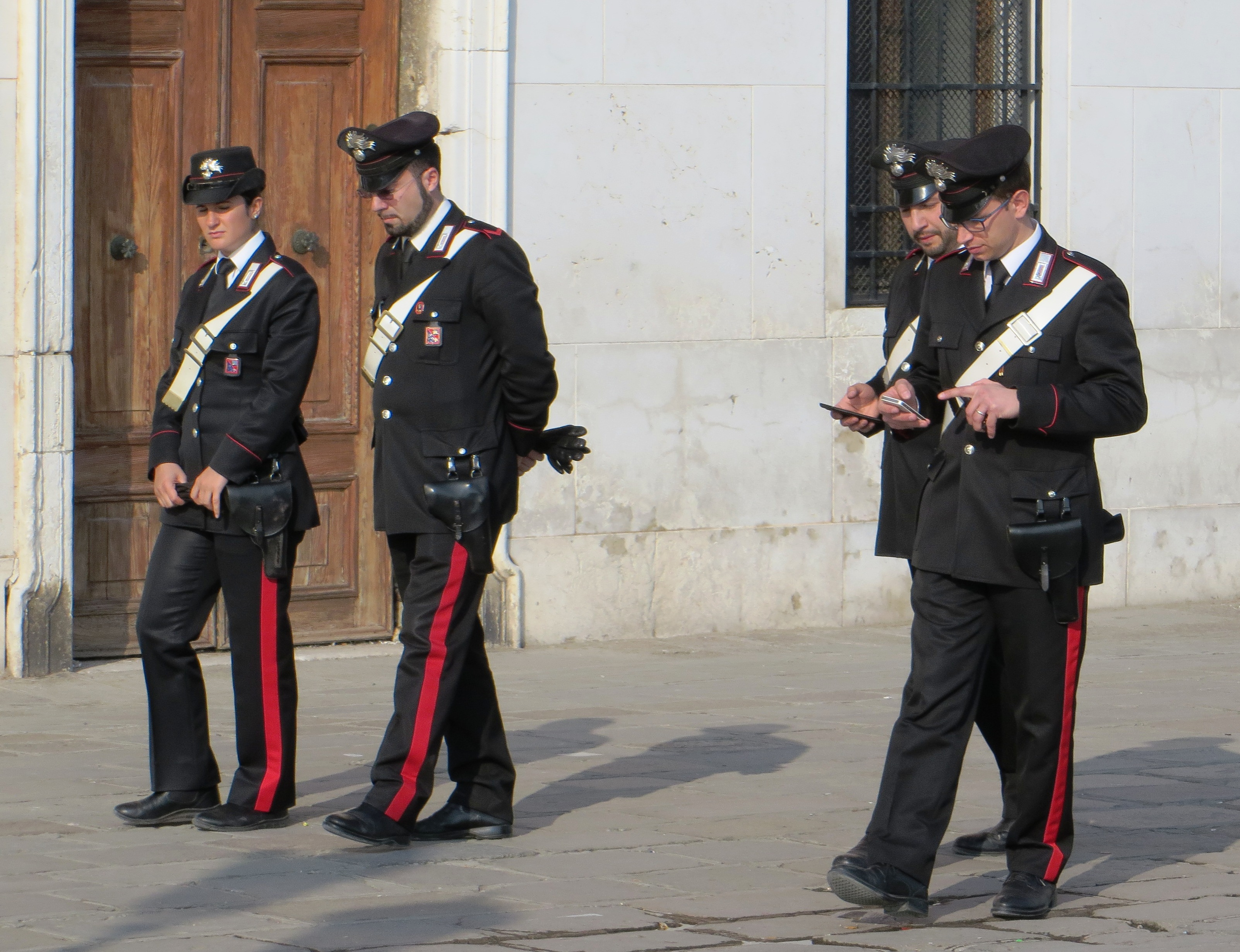
Carabinieri in everyday ordinary uniform, winter version. Note the pistol worn on the left side for cross-draw purposes and the white cross-belt. (March 2015)

The modern Carabinieri Force uniform is coloured in black for every seasonal version, with small variations on a weather basis (coat or wind jacket), and is composed of:

- a four-button jacket with shoulder pads: all buttons on the uniform are silvered
- a shirt underneath in white, with two pockets
- trousers have a classic cut, with four pockets and two vertical red stripes along the outer side of both legs, stretching from the hips to the ankles
- flat black shoes

The uniform is accompanied by accessories such as:

- the black tie,
- the white cross-belt, or Sam Browne or no belt,
- peaked cap (males), bowler cap (females)
- black leather gloves,
- V-neck sweater
- windbreaker
- waterproof coat

There are differences for season, duties, rank and location. For instance, in the summer, the four-button jacket, white shirt and tie are replaced with a short-sleeved blue shirt.

Depending on the weather conditions, the uniform can be worn with a waterproof coat (or beaver cloth for officers) and an anorak. Inside the military installations, the jacket can be removed or replaced with the "V-neck" sweater.

In 2020, new 'bomber-style jackets', with appropriate logos, were introduced, which can be worn instead of the four-button jacket. The white cross belt is still worn on top, and either a roll-neck base layer or a white shirt and tie is worn underneath.

Accessories are the same, although Wanted in Rome reported that: "The old leather holster will also be retired, replaced by an external belt with a quick-release holster, made of plastic material. The old gloves will be replaced with modern, cut-resistant gloves. However, style has not been sacrificed for function, begging the question, are the Carabinieri of Rome the most stylish police force in the world?"

==== Headdress ====
The regulation peaked cap is rigid with a frieze of the Carabinieri (metallic for pinned, Carabinieri and students, embroidered in silver fabric for NCOs, gilded for the inspectors and officers while for the generals the frieze is the eagle of the staff with RI monogram in the centre, silver for brigade and division generals, gold for corps generals). The commanding officers of the department wear the frieze embroidered in gold-edged with red.

The official emblem is placed at the center of the cap.

Each cap is black and has a wimple held by two rounded buttons, the wimple is black for carabinieri, pinned, brigadiers and students; for the chief brigadiers the wimple is also black but with the addition of a silver galloncino mottled with black. The wimple becomes silver mottled with black in the center from the rank of marshal to that of chief marshal with the number of chevrons increasing as the rank increases. For the major marshals, the wimple is silver edged in red with three silver gallons flecked with black; for the top rank of non-commissioned officers, i.e. the lieutenant, the wiggle is silver edged in red with four silver braids edged in red.

For the lower officers, the wiggle and the braids are entirely in silver without streaks, for the superior officers, the wiggle becomes a double braided cord always silver with silver braids. Finally, for the general officers, the wimple becomes a silver braid with silver braids.

Other forms of headdress include berets and mountain-style caps. Carabinieri MP Units also wear a dark navy blue beret.

=== Service uniform ===
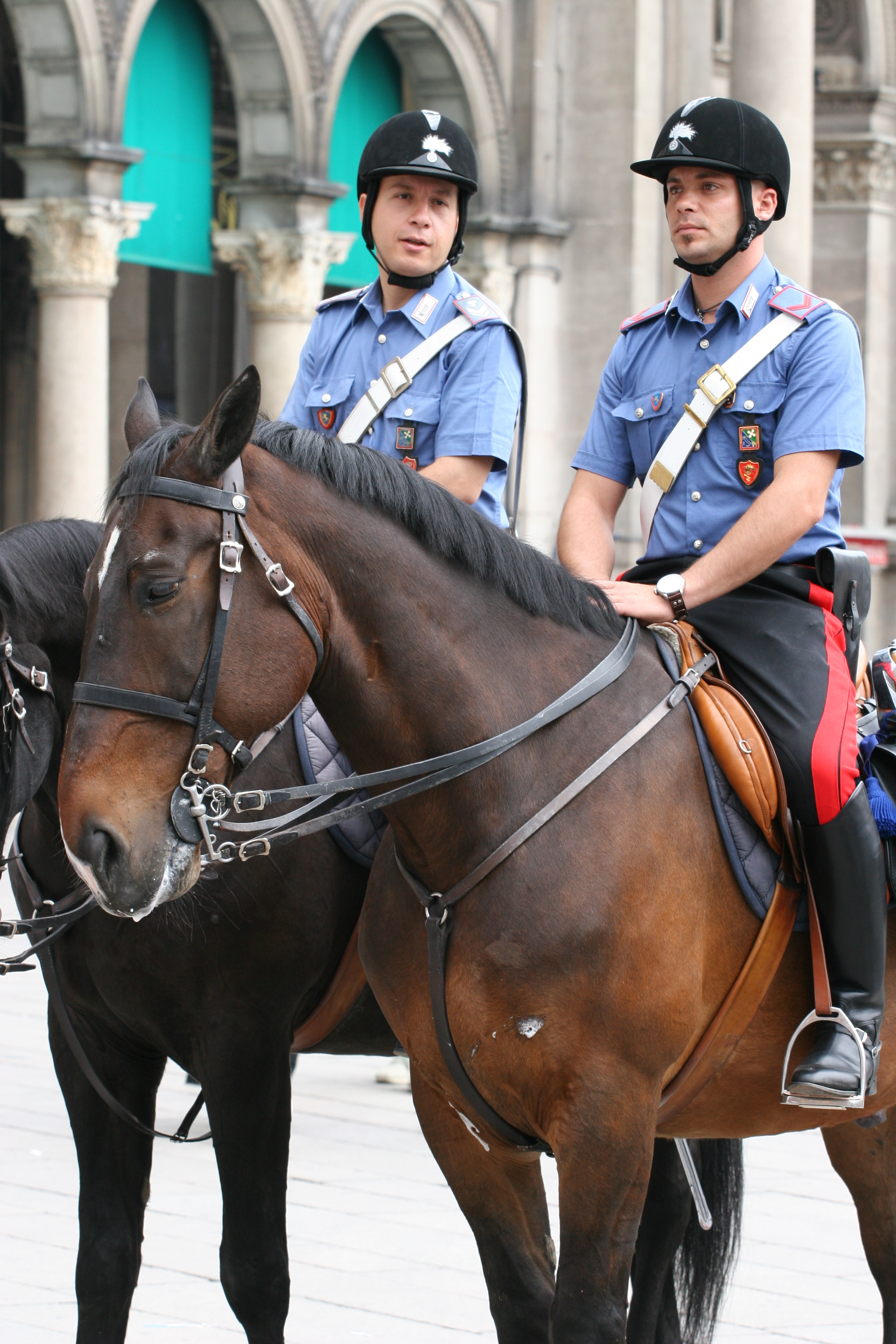
Carabinieri on horseback wearing service uniform for mounted duty; note the riding safety helmet with capbadge and tall boots.

The service uniform is essentially the same as the ordinary uniform but is adapted for the specific duty of the soldier.

E.g.:

- mountainous areas – ski patrol; ski kit is worn,
- mounted (horseback) patrol; different boots are worn,
- 'radio-mobile' (car) patrol; different boots and a 'paletta' (stop sign used to stop vehicles) are worn, etc.

=== Representative (dress) uniform ===
(For carabinieri, NCOs, warrant officers, officers.)

The representative uniform is essentially the same as the ordinary uniform, but worn for more formal, but still on duty occasions, where the ordinary and ceremonial uniforms are unsuitable. It differs from the ordinary uniform for the following elements:

- white cords (agiluettes) on the four-button jacket,
- sabre (sword) with pendants and dragon,
- black belt with shoulder strap (only marshals and chief brigadiers) or white cross-belt/bandolier (for the remaining staff).
- white gloves
- and a black-cape in colder conditions

Sometimes the pistol is worn with the sword, other times it is not. The cap worn is the peaked cap.

=== Operational uniform ===
The operational uniform is worn for public order (riot) situations, raids, cross-country work and is worn for operations only. It is blue in color with red piping and a 'Polychrome' uniform.

It consists of:

- jacket (with four patch pockets, shoulder straps fastened by a button and thermal lining) and trousers;
- blue fleece suit (to be used as an alternative to the sweater);
- blue neckerchief with red piping;
- black leather gloves with reinforcement;
- operational black amphibious ankle boots
- and a dark-blue beret with cap badge

A "particular" version of this uniform is worn by the soldiers of the Special Intervention Group, as well as the following departments: The "Tuscania" CC Parachute Regiment, Carabinieri Regiment on Horseback and Airborne Squadrons CC Cacciatori. The colours (for the trousers and jacket) are often camouflage rather than blue and red and maroon/red (for the beret) rather than blue.

Riot helmets, body-armour, equipment vests, rescue helmets etc., are worn when necessary.

=== Gymnastic ===
It consists of a tracksuit (jacket and pants), t-shirt and shorts.

The suit consists of a jacket and long trousers in blue fabric, with red inserts. The jacket is made up of a body with a central zip, two detachable sleeves with a zip and a collar. The trousers consist of two leggings, an elastic waistband with a drawstring at the waist and a zip at the bottom. The jacket, the T-shirt and the shorts bear the frieze of the Carabinieri.

=== Other ===
There are also evening-dress style (mess kit) uniforms for dinners and galas, as well as variations for the above uniform for occasions (e.g. medals, sabres to be worn etc.).

The full set of different Carabinieri uniforms today is presented here (in Italian).

==== Females ====
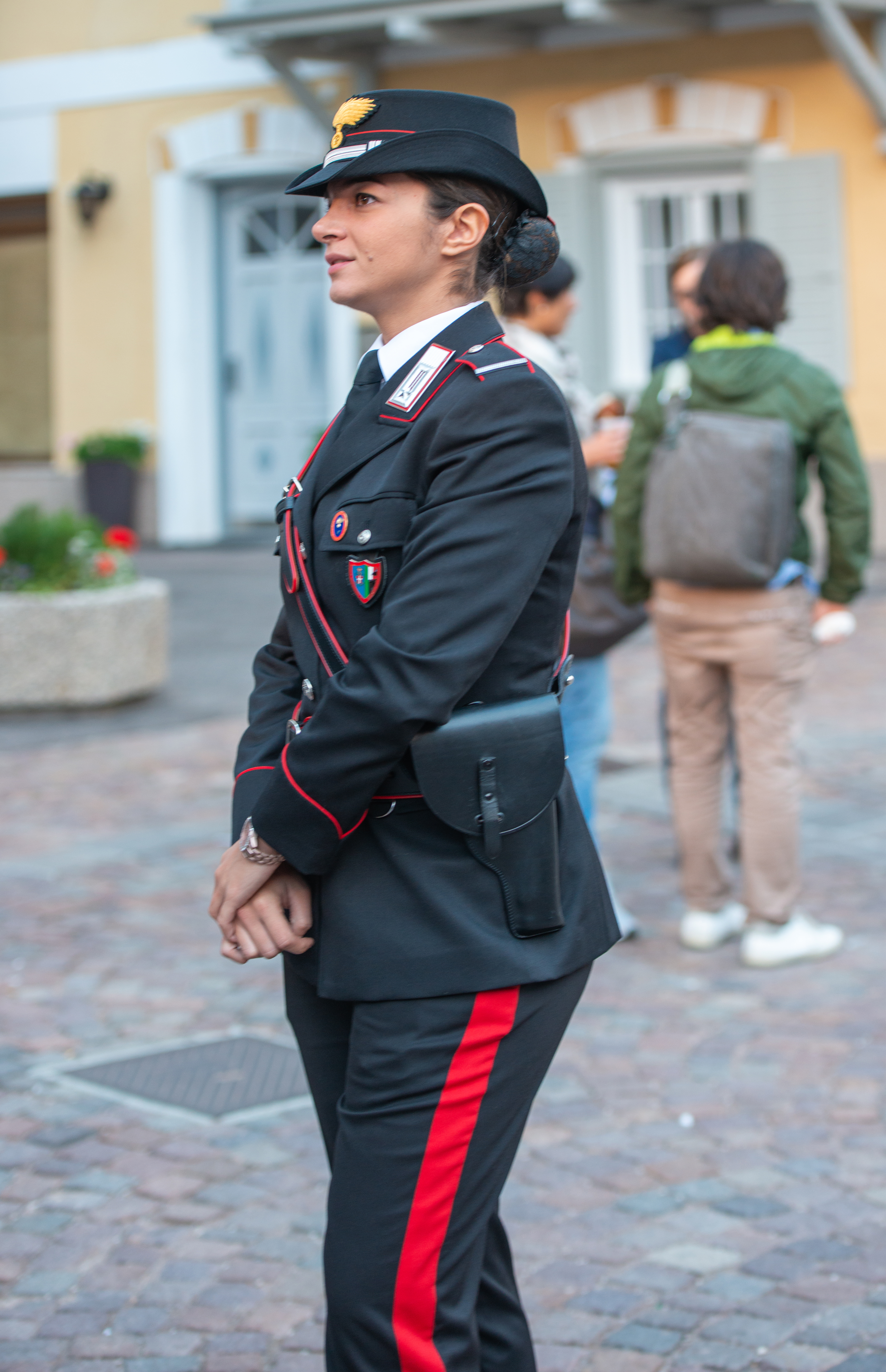
Arma dei Carabinieri female warrant officer in ordinary uniform. Note the Sam Browne belt worn by warrant officers

The uniforms adopted for female staff are essentially an adaptation of the male ones.

The variants concern the buttoning, the shape of the jackets (without upper pockets), the use of skirts inside the Offices, off-duty or with formal uniforms and shoes.

No changes were made to any other items of clothing/equipment already in use by male personnel.

== Decorations ==
The corps bears the following decorations:

- 6 Cavalier Crosses of the Military Order of Italy
- 3 Gold Medals of Military Valor
- 3 Gold Medals of Army Valor
- 5 Silver Medals of Military Valor
- 4 Bronze Medals of Military Valor
- 11 Gold Medals of Civil Valor
- 1 Silver Medal of Civil Valor
- 2 War Crosses of Military Valor
- 4 Gold Medals of Civil Merit
- 6 Gold Medals of Benemerited Public Security
- 6 Gold Medals of Benemerited Service to Education, Culture and the Arts
- 2 Gold Medals of Benemerited Service to the Environment
- 1 Gold Medal of Service in the Earthquake of 1909
- 1 Bronze Medal of Civil Defense Excellence 1st Class

== Weapons ==
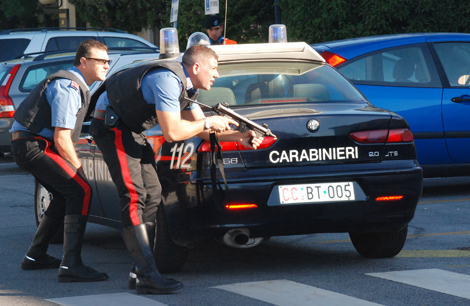
Carabinieri officers armed with a Beretta PM-12 submachine gun

Weapon	Origin	Type
Beretta 92	Italy	Individual armament
Beretta 8000	Italy	Individual armament for officers, to be replaced by the Px4
Beretta Px4 Storm	Italy	Individual armament for officers, replacing the decommissioned Cougar 8000
Glock 17	Austria	Special armament supplied to GIS
Beretta PM12-S2	Italy	Ordinary armament, to be replaced by the PMX
Beretta PMX	Italy	Ordinary armament, intended to replace the PM12
Heckler & Koch MP5	Germany	Special armament
Beretta 70/90	Italy	Ordinary armament, "AR" and "SCP" versions, to be decommissioned
Beretta ARX-160A3	Italy	Ordinary armament, replacement of the 70/90 rifles
M4 carbine	USA	Special armament
Accuracy International AWP	UK	Special armament, used by snipers and GIS
Mauser Sp 66	Germany	Special armament, used by snipers and GIS
Beretta MG 42/59	Italy	Special armament
FN Minimi	Belgium	Special armament

== Vehicles and equipment ==
Until very recently the Italian police (including the Carabinieri) operated only Italian-made vehicles, but that changed with the introduction of Land Rover Defenders and Subarus into service. Normal Carabinieri patrol vehicles are dark blue with a white roof, with a red stripe along the side. Carabinieri license plates begin with "CC" or previously with "EI" (formerly Esercito Italiano, Italian Army), and a Carabinieri car is traditionally called a Gazzella (gazelle). Small or medium-sized cars are used for ordinary patrol work, with larger and more powerful vehicles being used for emergency response, highway patrol, and special services. The vehicles of the Carabinieri military police and mobile units are painted in NATO camouflage scheme as done with the other Italian Armed Forces vehicles.

=== Cars ===
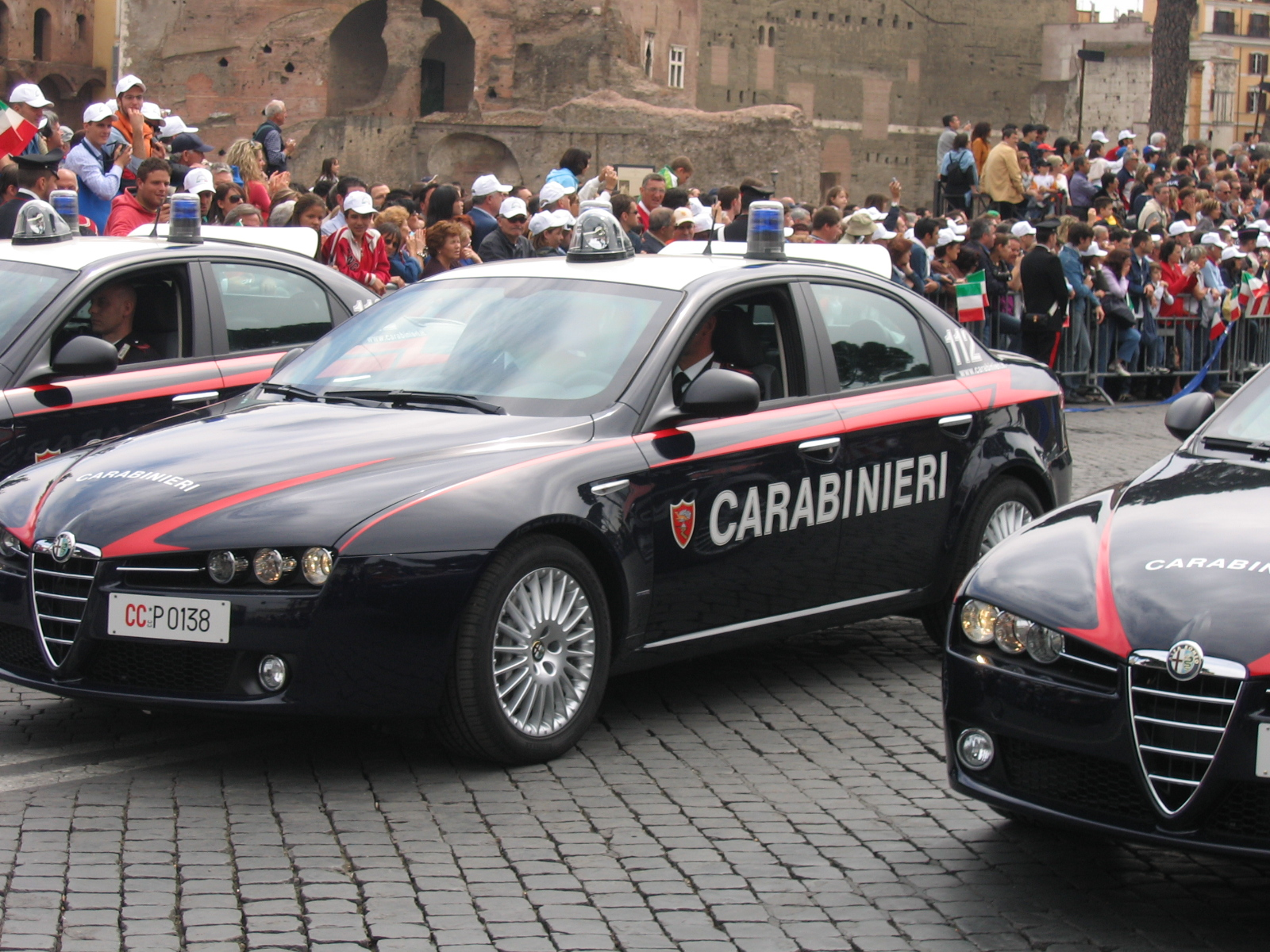
Carabinieri Alfa Romeo 159.

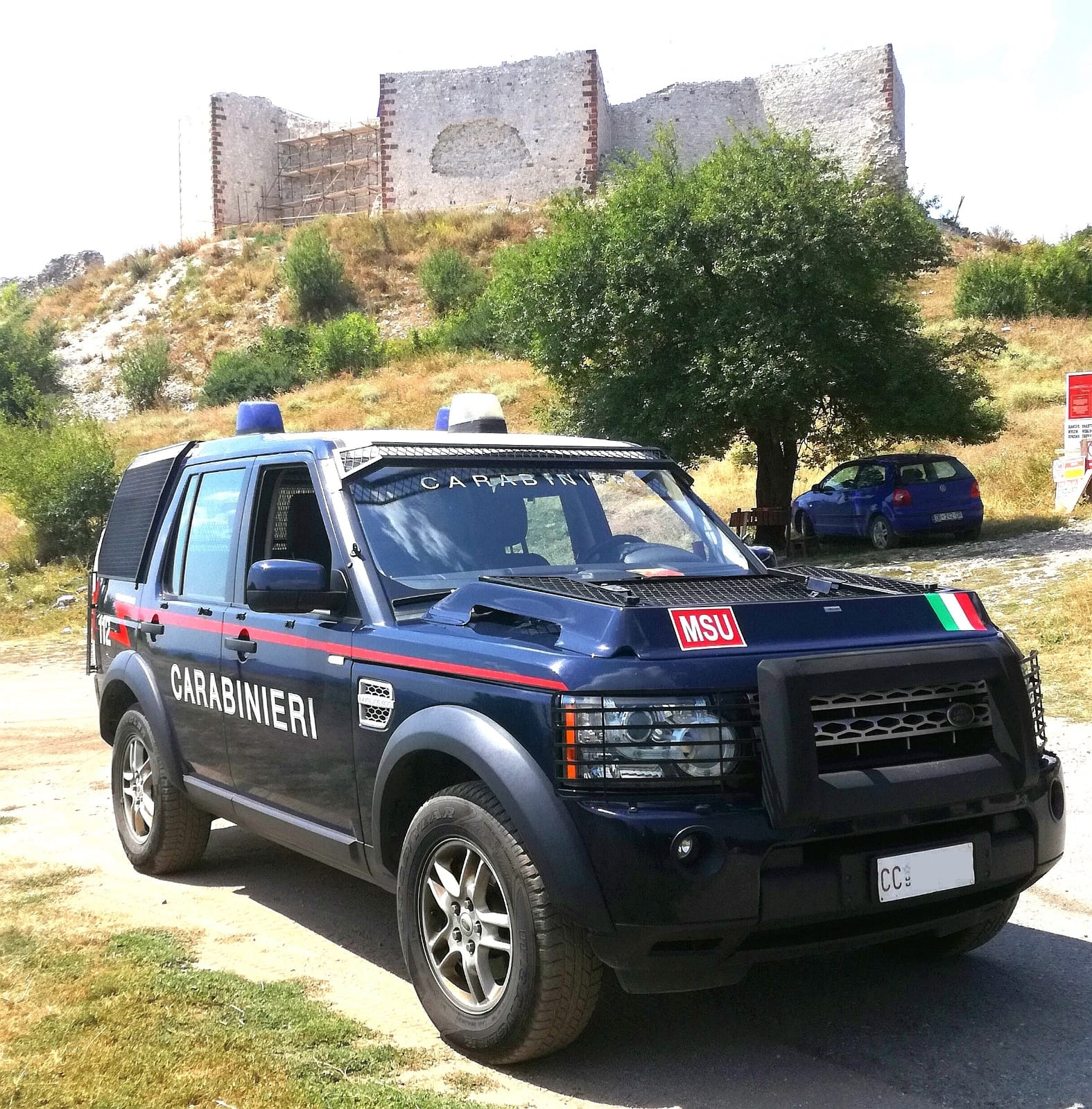
MSU Land Rover Discovery IV in Kosovo.

- Alfa Romeo 159
- Alfa Romeo Giulia
- Alfa Romeo Giulietta
- Subaru Forester
- Lancia Kappa
- Land Rover Freelander
- Land Rover Defender-90 hard top
- Land Rover Discovery II e III e IV
- Lotus Evora S
- Maserati MCPura
- Fiat Ducato
- Hummer H1
- Fiat Grande Punto
- Fiat Tipo (2015)
- Jeep Renegade
- Jeep Grand Cherokee
- Mitsubishi Pajero
- Mitsubishi i-MiEV
- Nissan Leaf
- Isuzu D-Max
- Renault Clio
- Iveco Daily
- SEAT León
- Suzuki Jimny

=== Motorcycles ===
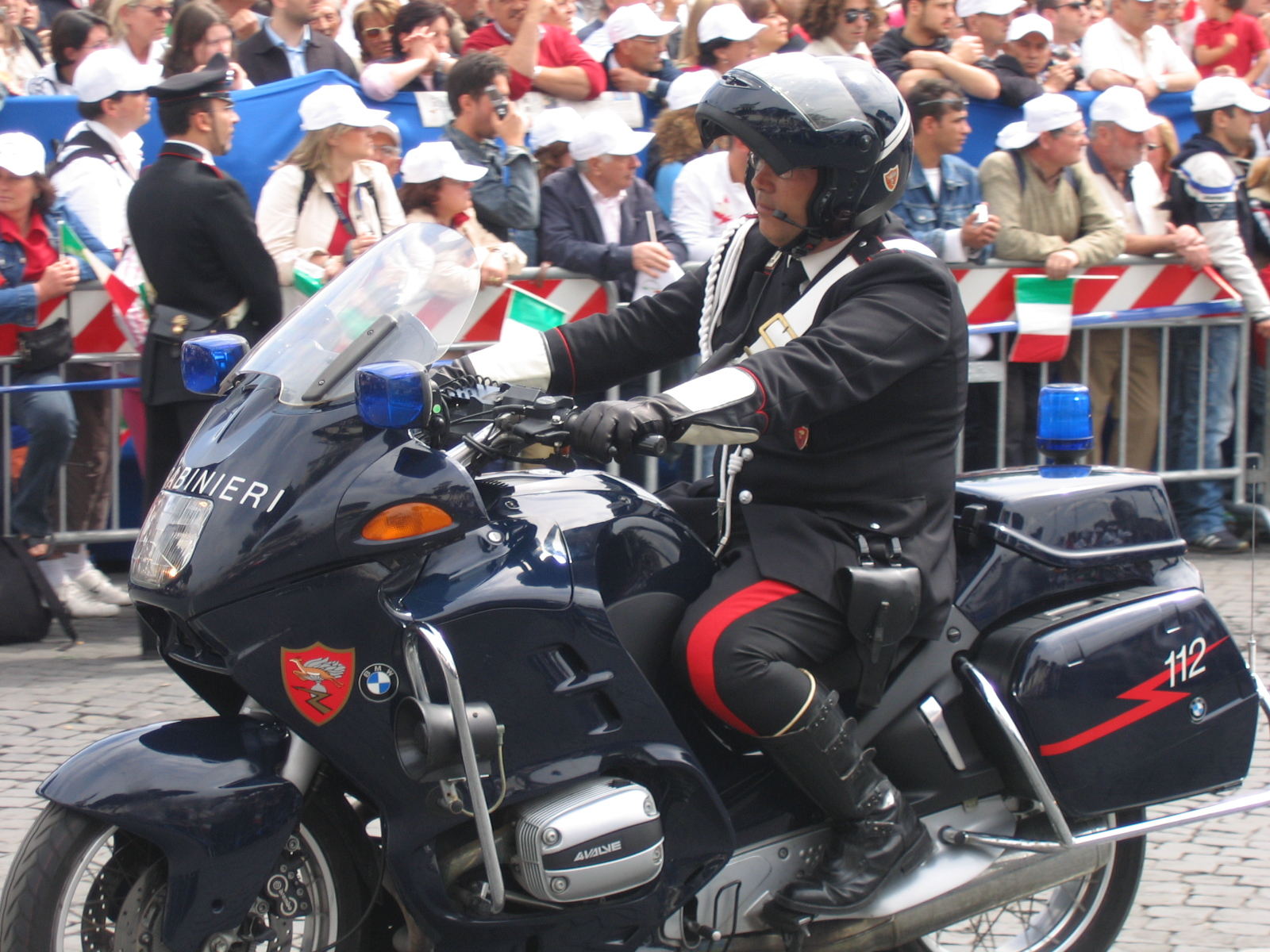
Carabinieri BMW R1100-RTP

- Moto Guzzi California Cruiser
- BMW F650GS
- BMW R1100-RTP
- BSA M20

=== Aircraft ===
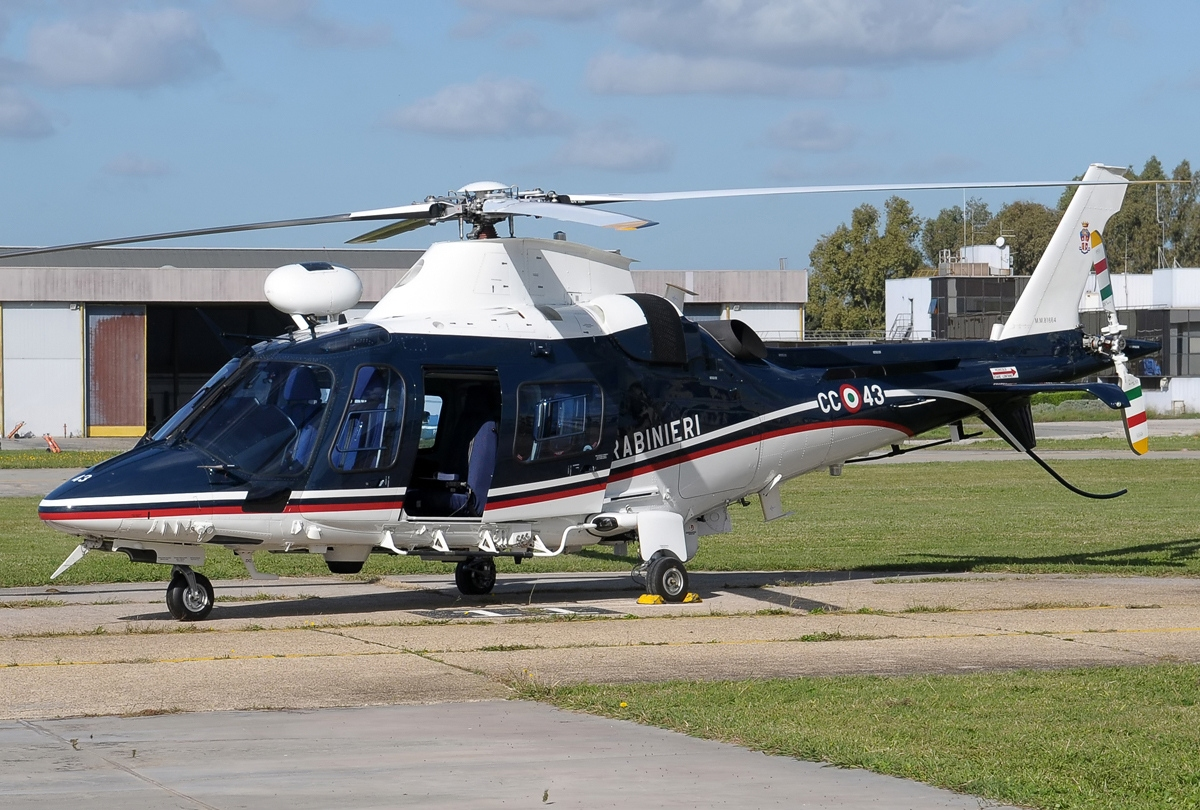
Carabinieri AgustaWestland AW109N

- Fixed-wing aircraft
  - Piaggio P.180 Avanti
- Helicopters
  - AgustaWestland AW109
  - Agusta-Bell AB 412
  - AgustaWestland AW139 (2019)

=== Tactical vehicles ===
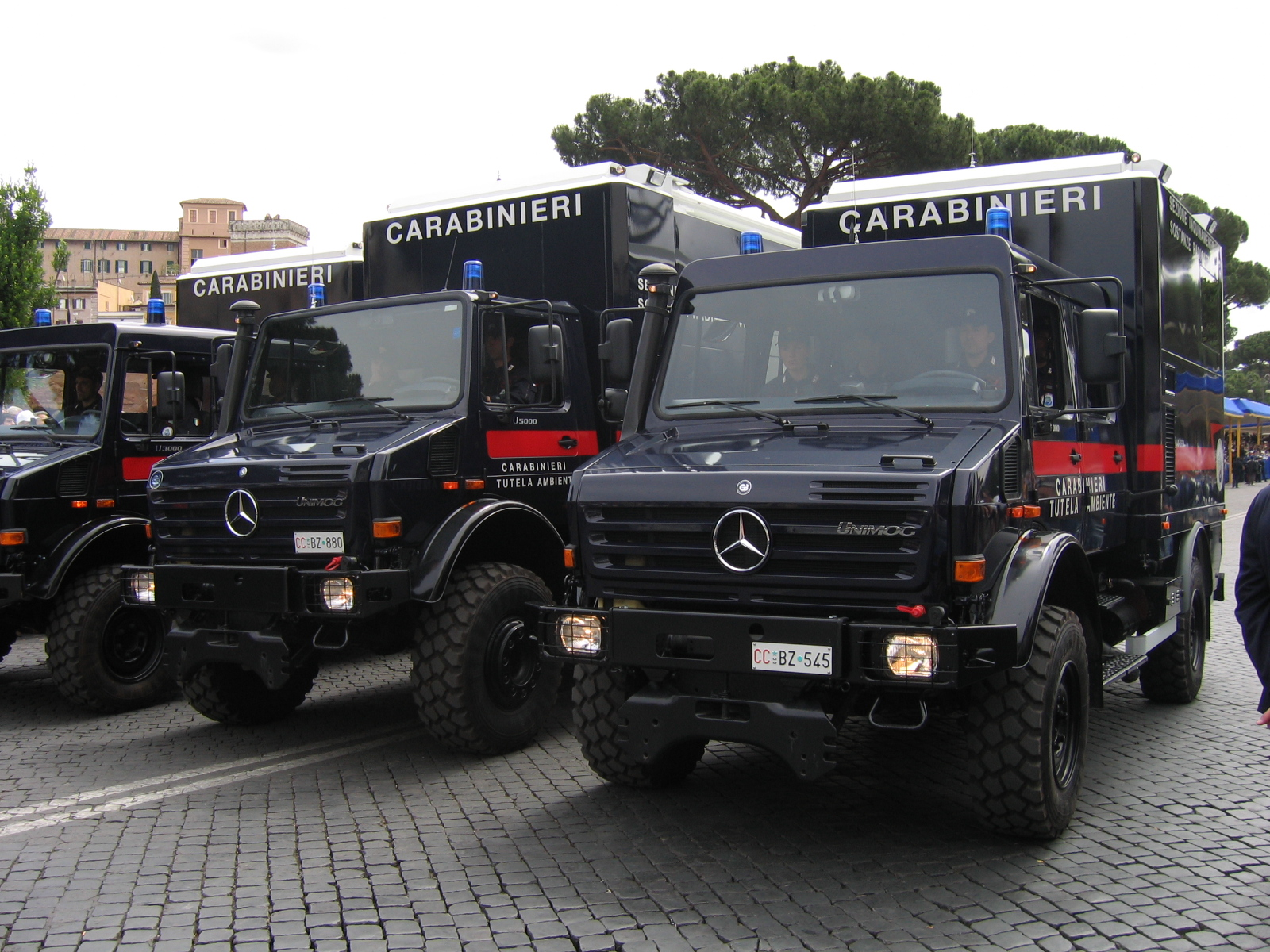
Carabinieri Mercedes Unimog 3000 – 5000 mobile labs for CBRN (Chemical, Biological, Radiological & Nuclear) activity

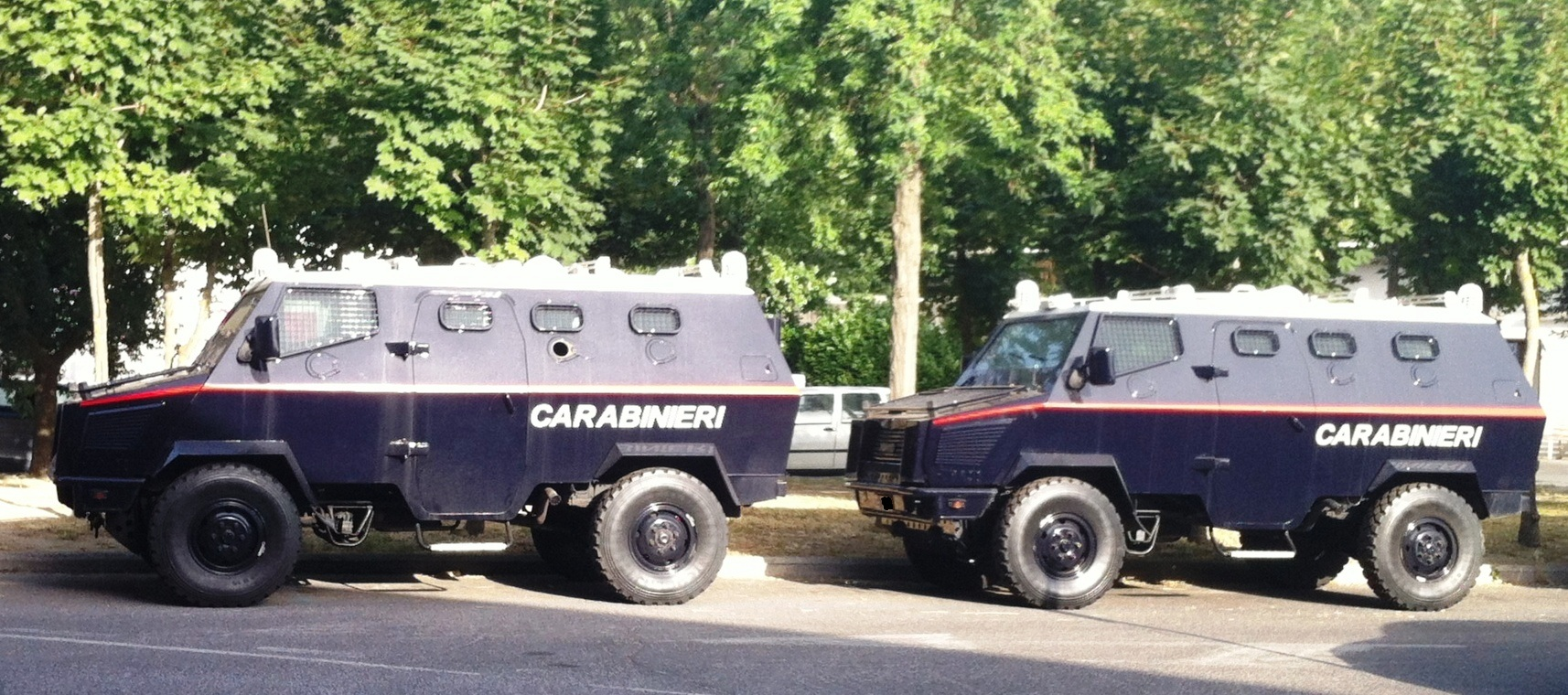
Carabinieri Iveco VM 90P Protected.

- Land Rover Defender 110 soft top
- Iveco Daily 4×4 40.10WM 4×4 off-road light armored military truck
- Unimog
- RG-12
- Iveco VM 90T Torpedo
- Iveco VM 90P Protected
- Iveco LMV
- Puma 4×4
- Puma 6×6
- VCC1
- M113
- M3
- Hummer H1

=== Ships ===
- Offshore patrol boats
  - Motovedetta classe 800
  - Motovedetta classe N700
  - Motovedetta classe 600
- Coastal patrol boats
  - Motovedetta classe 200
  - Motovedetta classe 100
- Motorboats
  - Motovedetta classe 300
  - Motovedetta classe N100
  - Motovedetta classe T120
  - Motovedette classe S
  - Battello pneumatico Stinger

=== Special Vehicles ===
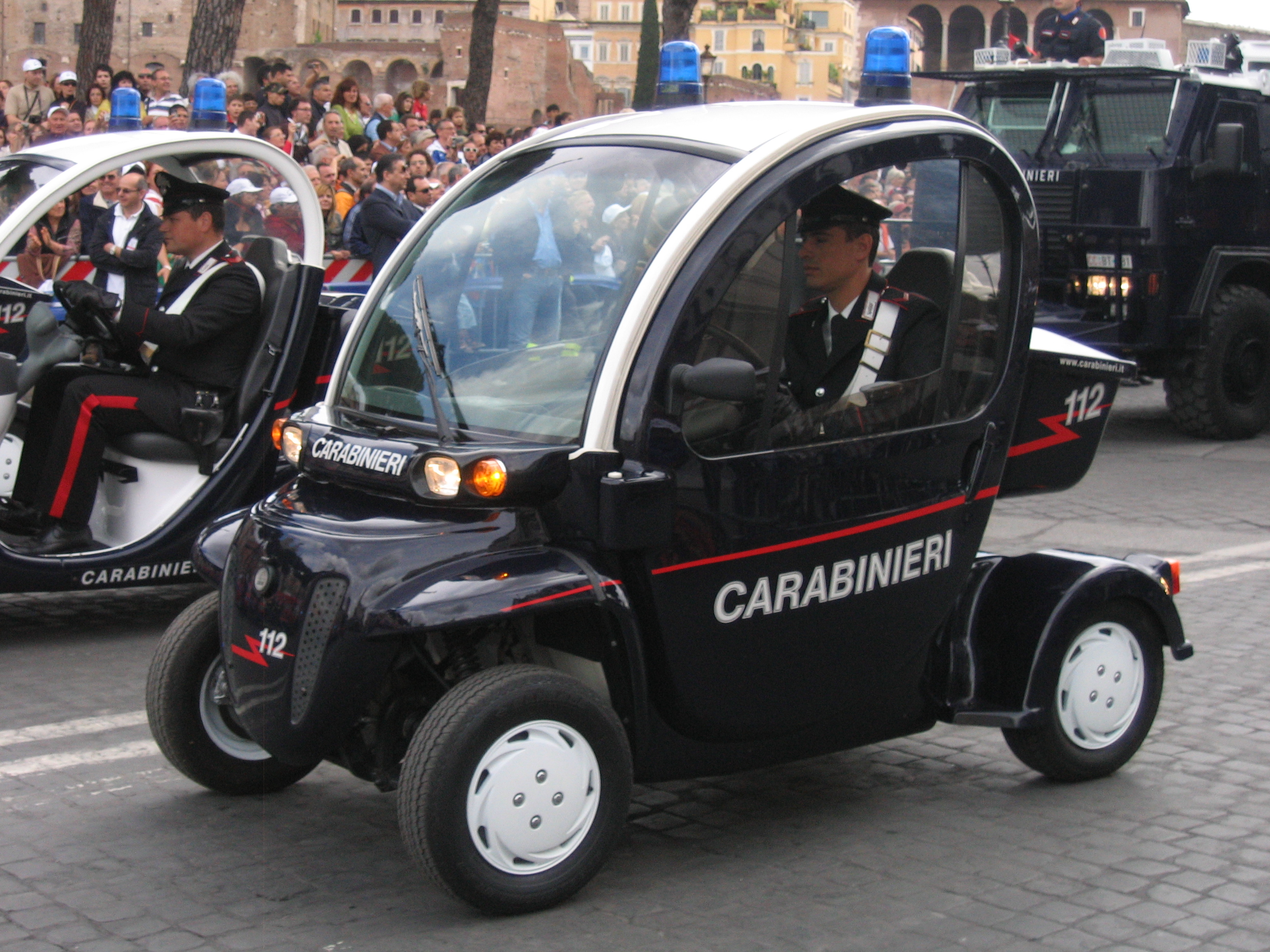
An Italian Carabinieri GEM e2 (called the Ovetti – "little eggs") in Carabinieri service. Used for patrolling urban areas.

- GEMCAR
- Snowmobile Polaris

=== Uniforms ===
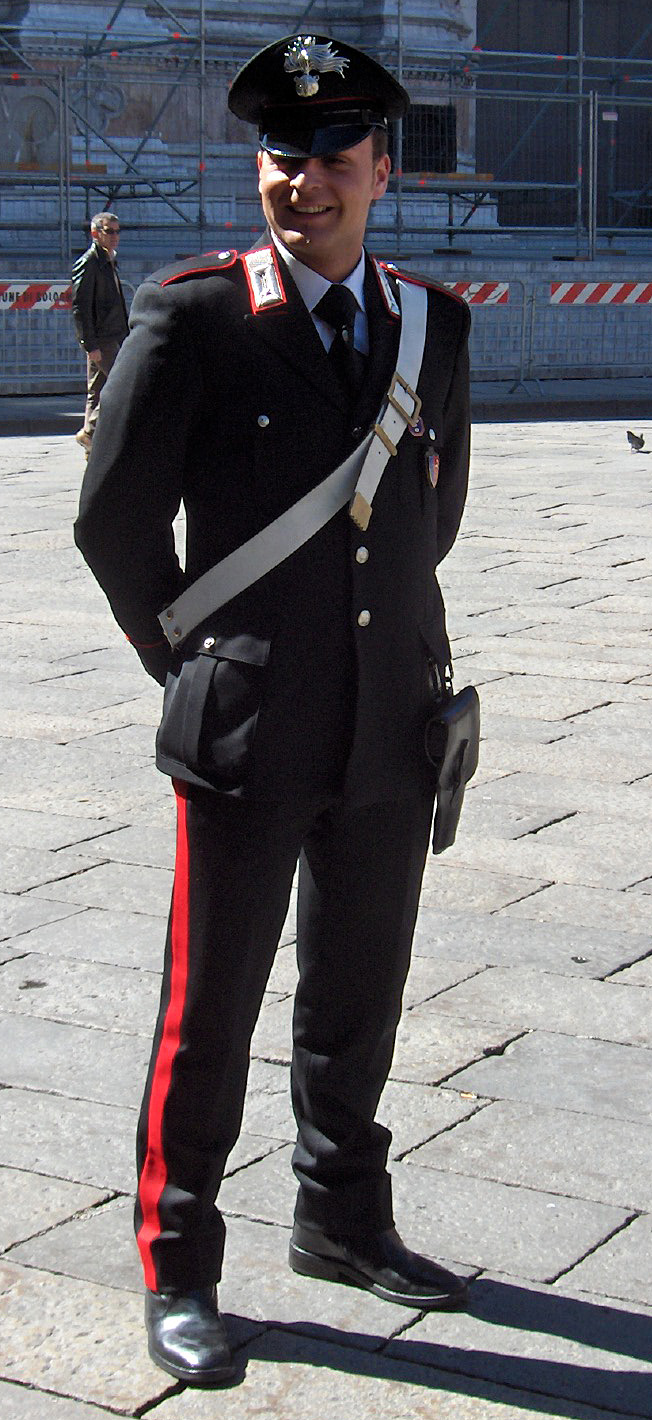
A Carabiniere in everyday uniform

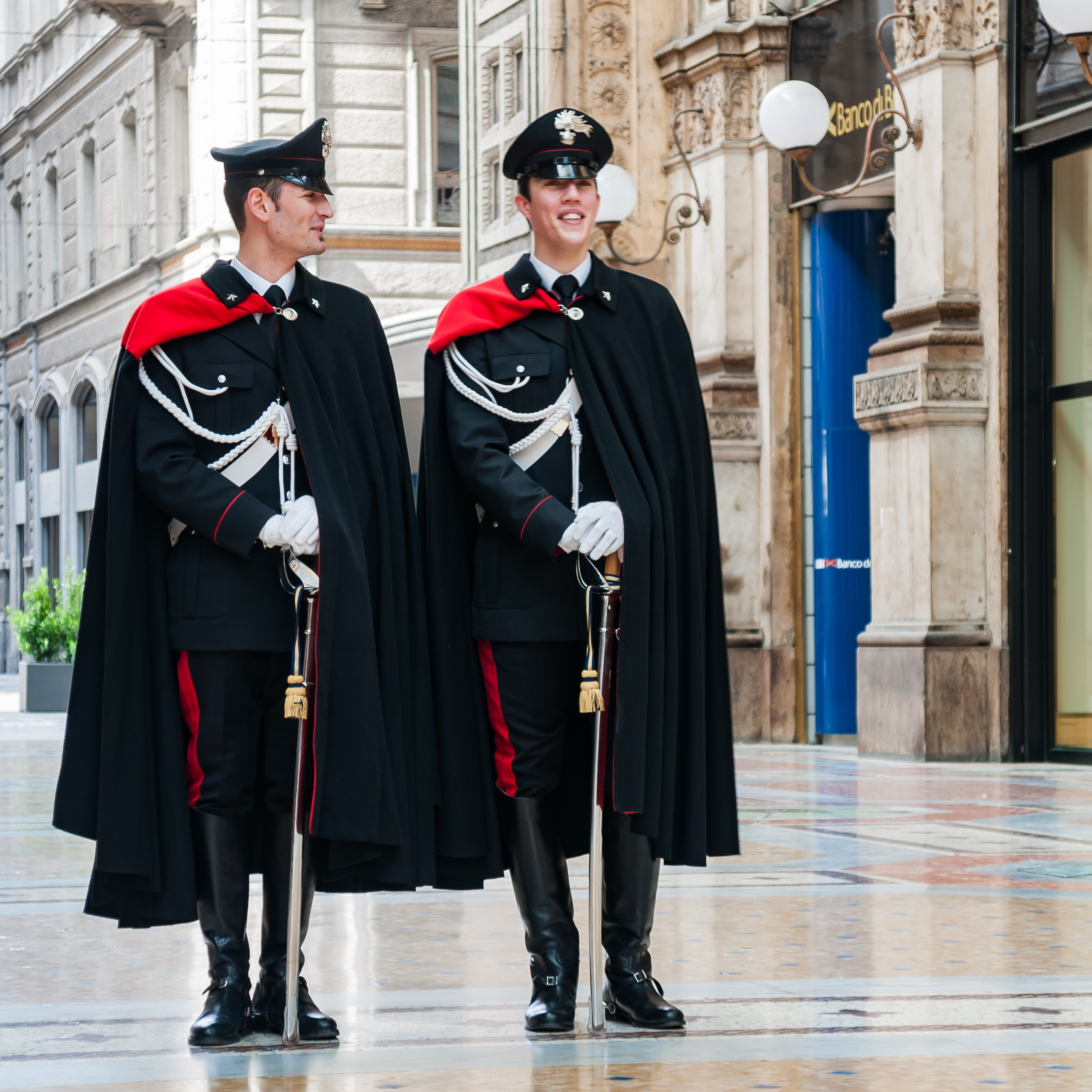
Carabinieri with capes

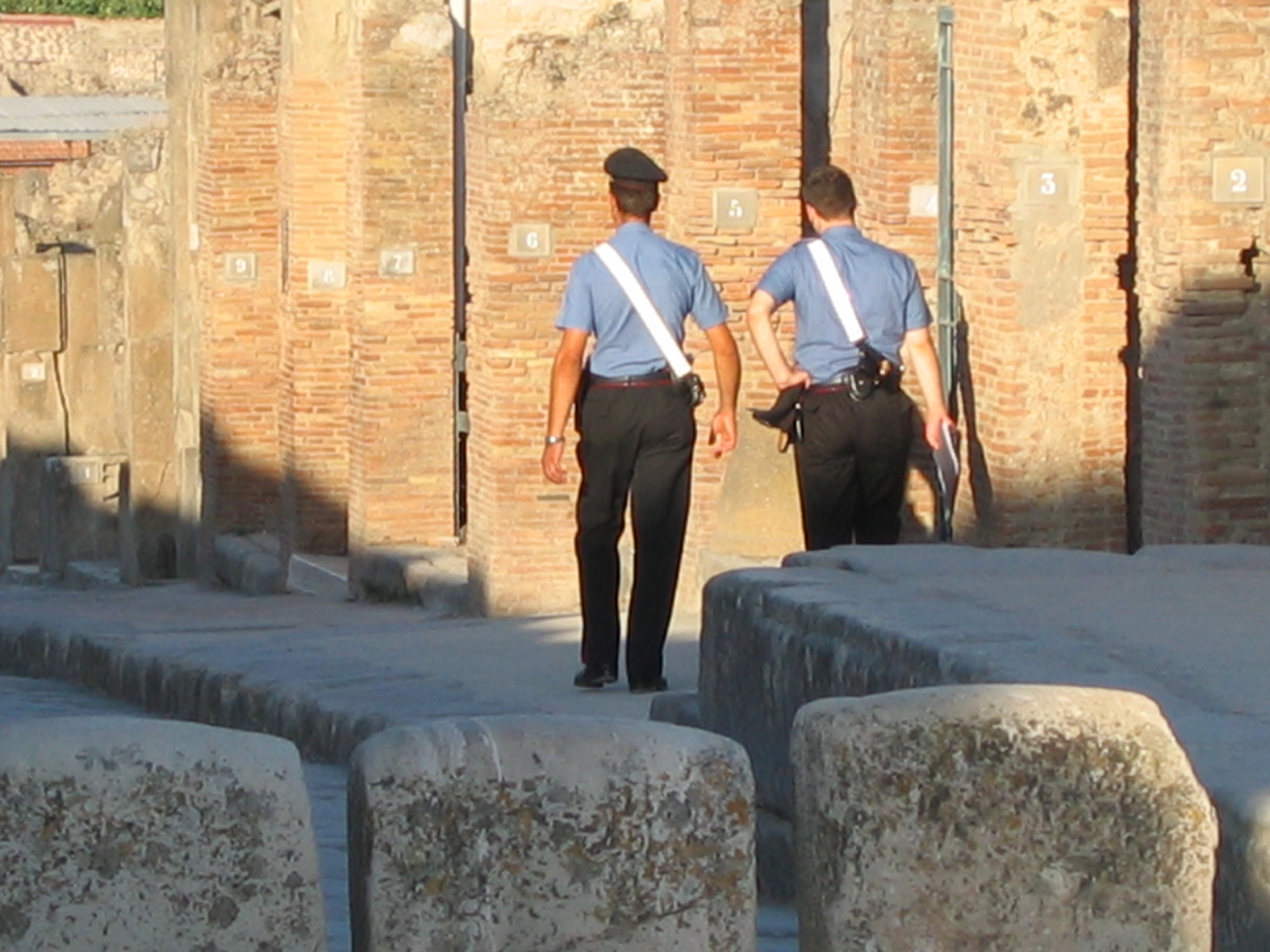
Summer dress

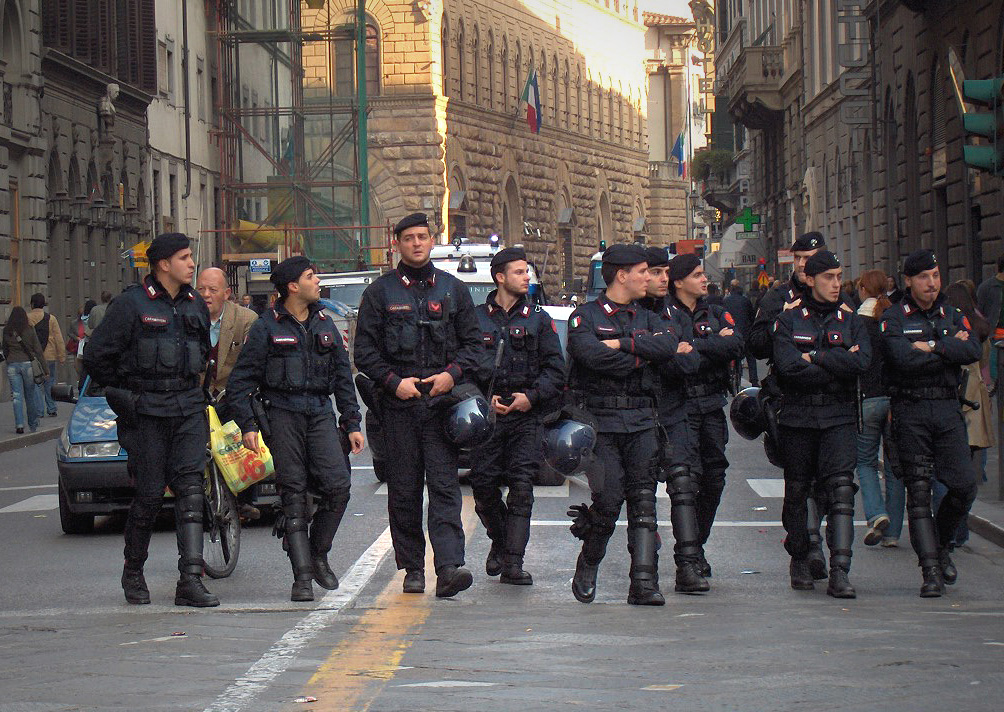
Carabinieri at a demonstration in Florence

== See also ==
- Italian Carabinieri Bands
- Civilian control of the military
- Corps of Gendarmerie of Vatican City
- Gendarmerie
- Law enforcement in Italy
- Military police
- Multinational Specialized Unit
- Zaptie
- Carlo Alberto Dalla Chiesa
- Centro Sportivo Carabinieri
