= Uniforms of the Italian Armed Forces =

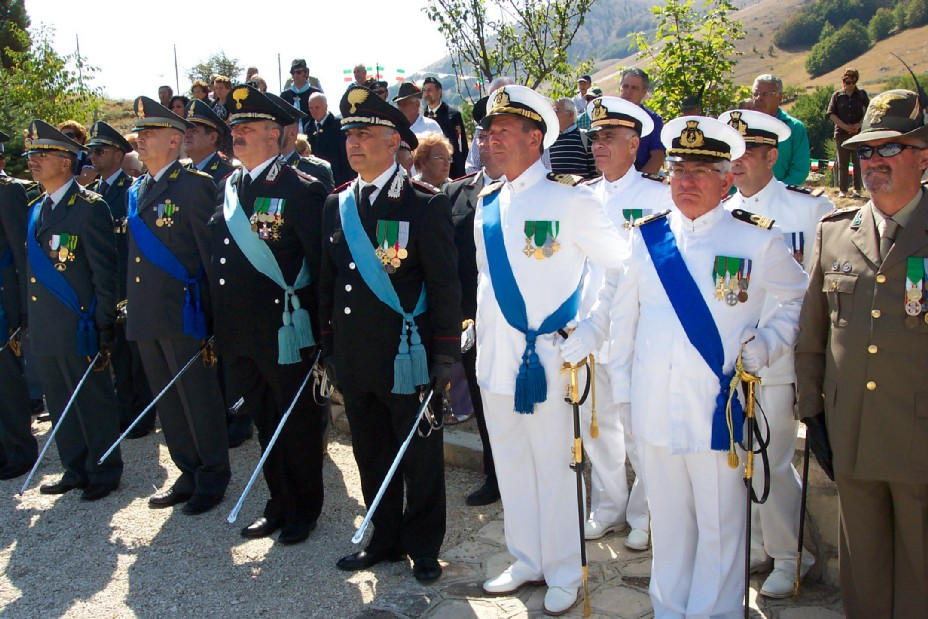
Officers of the Italian Armed Forces in dress uniform

The uniforms of the Italian Armed Forces include the official dress worn by members of the Italian Armed Forces while on duty. Each of the branches of the Italian Armed Forces, the Italian Army, the Italian Navy, the Italian Air Force, and the Carabinieri Corps, maintains its own style of dress. The Italian Armed Forces have an extensive history, during which they have undergone changes in the equipment they use, and the military uniforms they wear.

The style of the armed force's historical uniforms can be traced back to the Royal Sardinian Army in the mid-19th Century, which was the predecessor of the current Italian Armed Forces. As with other modern militaries, the branches of the Italian Armed Forces each maintain several different styles of dress, including a ceremonial, service dress, mess dress, and combat uniforms.

Since the abolition of the Monarchy in 1946, the Republican form of government has made no major changes to ceremonial and historical uniforms except of replacing the Monarchy's emblems (Such as, the monogram of the reigning King) with Republican ones (Mostly, the combined letters of R and I, meaning Italian republic, Italian: Repubblica Italiana.)

== History ==
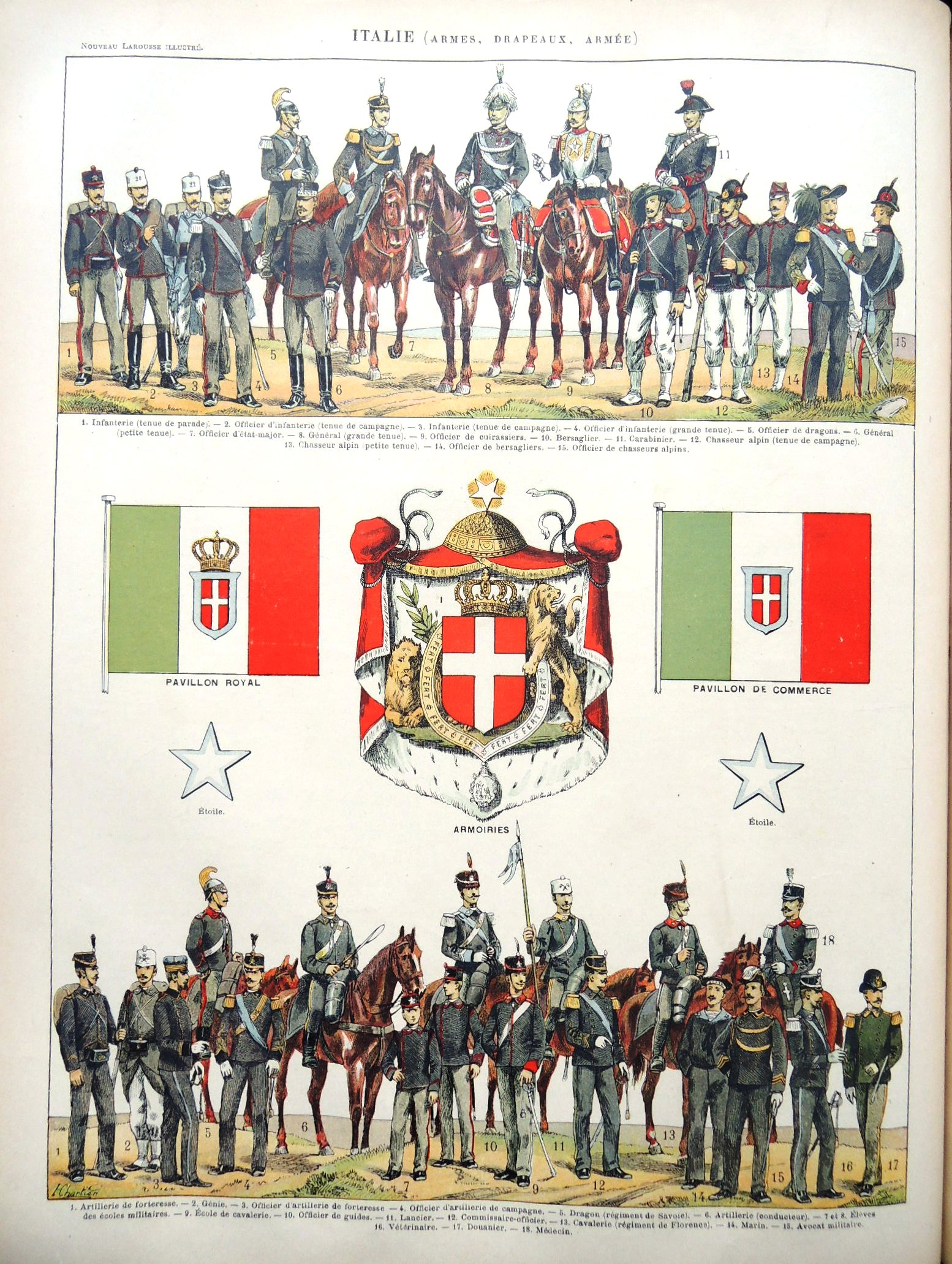
Various uniforms used by the Royal Italian Army during the 19th century

The uniforms of the Italian Armed Forces, at first, had symbolic meanings and later on, became more function and grade-based. During the Spedizione dei Mille (an event during the war for the Italian Unification, nationally called Risorgimento), where Giuseppe Garibaldi's volunteer troops unofficially helped the King of Savoy to conquer the Kingdom of the Two Sicilies, all of the troops wore red shirts, following the example of Garibaldi's Italian Legion that had fought in the Guerra Grande in South America. This earned the volunteer troops the nickname: the Camicie rosse. The first historical records of the actual Italian military uniform are dated back to the Statute conceded by the King (called Statuto Albertino) of the Royal Italian Army (Italian: Regio Esercito Italiano) in 1861, the year of Italian Unification. The soldiers of the Royal Army dressed in green coloured uniforms with black boots and helmets. The black uniforms of Mussolini's militia, the Camicie Nere, is another symbolic army uniform in Italian history. Il Duce based these black uniforms on the uniforms of the Arditi, a special unit of the Italian Royal Army that fought in the First World War. During the World Wars, uniforms were prepared and manufactured in military factories. In 2000, the voluntary military service for women was started and female uniforms now represent 7% of all Italian military uniforms.

== Italian Air Force ==
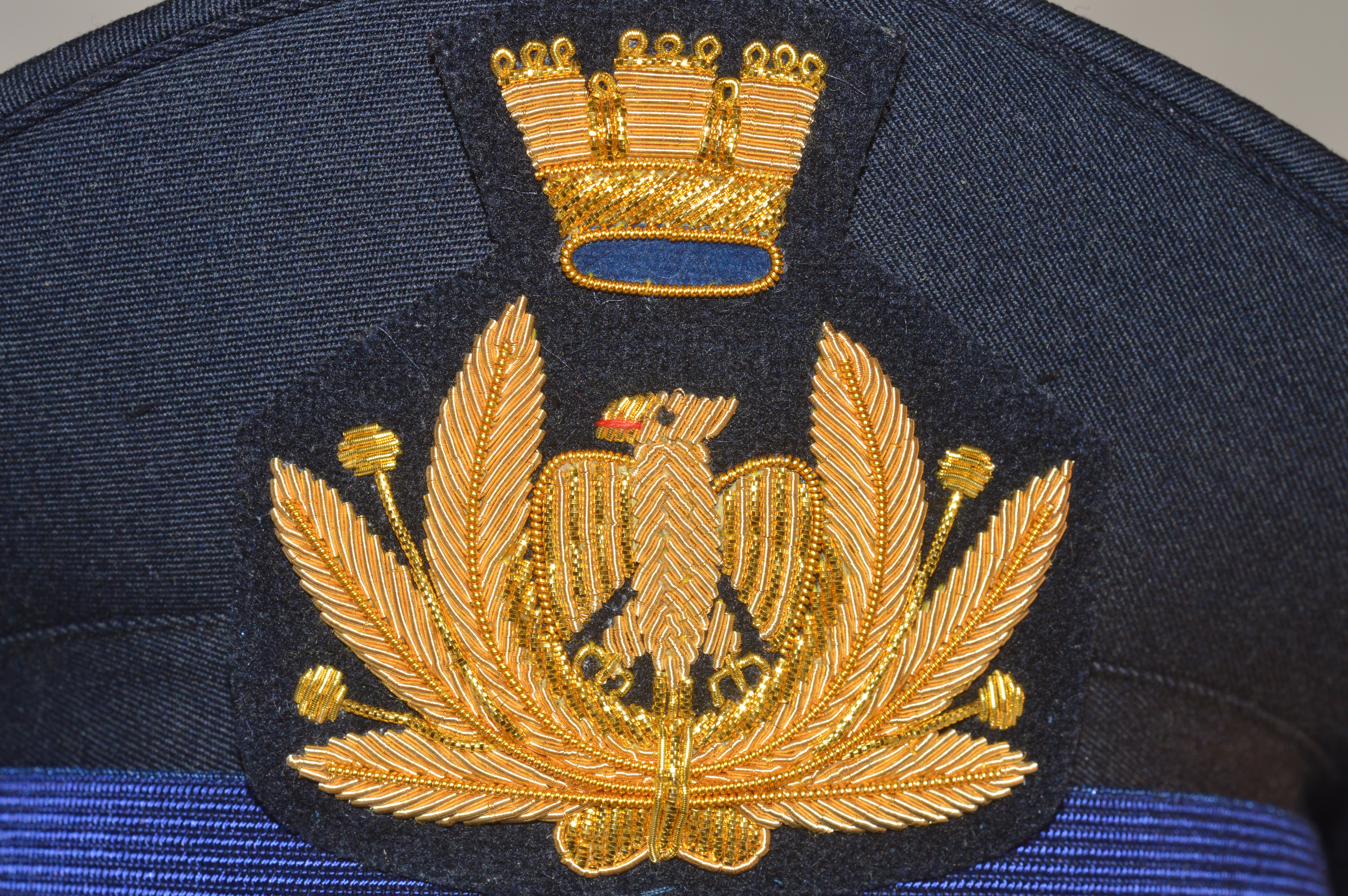
Peaked cap used

The first uniforms of the Italian Air Force included a hand-tailored dress tunic that was made of a medium blue-grey colored wool. The uniform consisted of a buttoned jacket and trousers, with a double buckled belt holding the jacket together to make the appearance of the serviceman more neat and trimmed down. It was worn with a white shirt and a blue or black tie. The first planes of the Italian Air Force were not equipped with a closed cabin for the pilots, so earlier versions of the uniforms for pilots included helmets and goggles.

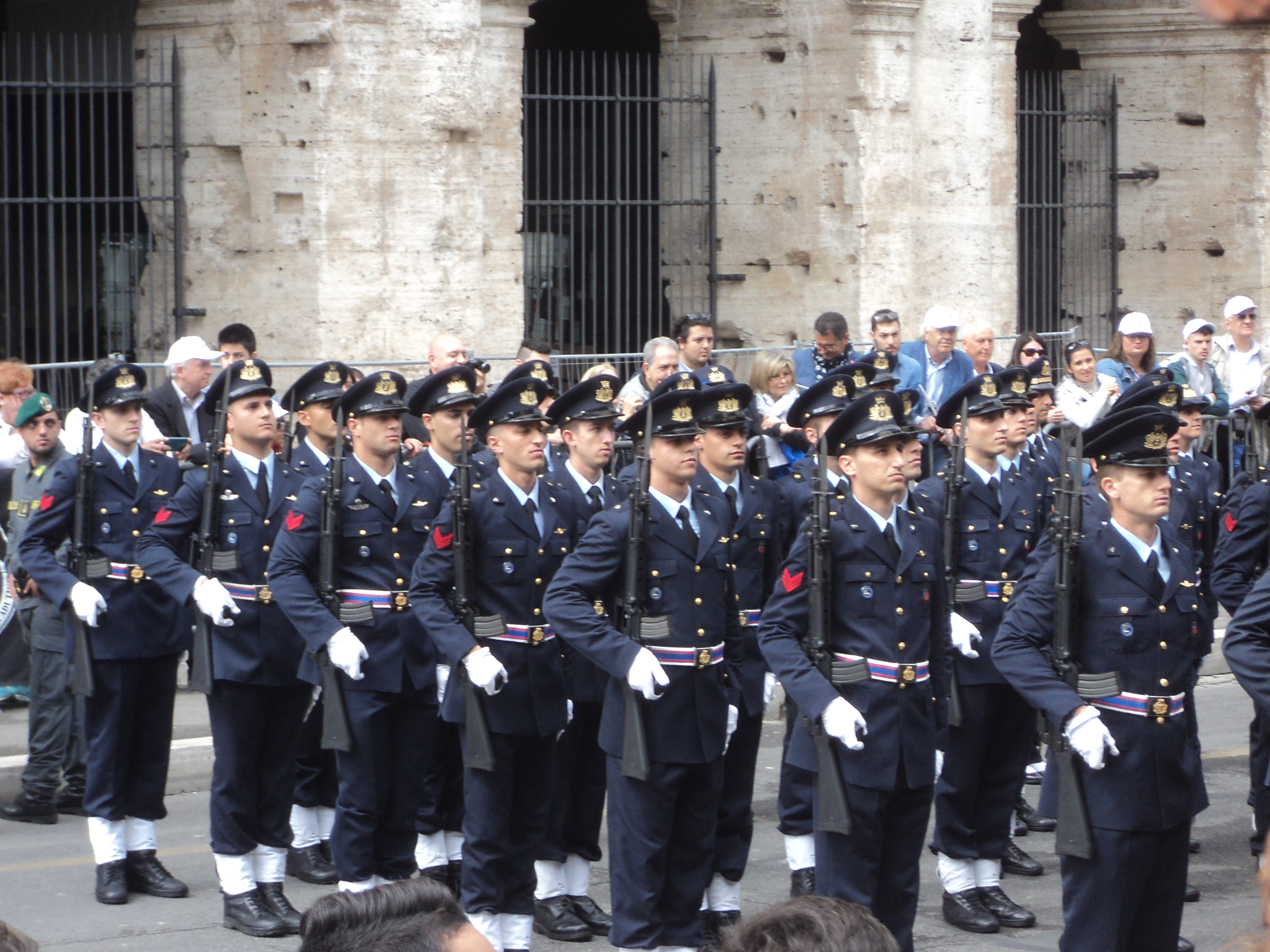
Members of the Italian Air Force in parade dress

=== Regular Uniform ===
The Air Force uniform no longer includes the helmets as part of the standard uniform. The uniforms vary also according to their department. These can be classified in the training department, flight department, support department, aerial defence department and a unit consisting of production. Unique to the Air Force uniforms is that in the public sector, the brand Aeronautica Militare has the license given by the Italian Air Force to produce and sell fashion that is based on the looks and designs of the Air Force uniforms.

=== 17° Stormo Incursori ===
The Italian Air Force special forces unit, the 17th Raiders Wing (Italian: 17° Stormo Incursori), was created during the Second World War. They are equipped with a military green uniform, including a multi-pocket jacket used to hold any kind of equipment or other devices needed in order to ensure versatility and total functionality when in use.

== Italian Army ==
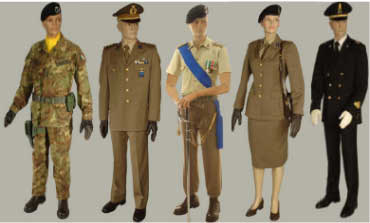
Various uniforms used within the Italian Army

The uniforms that are currently in use by the Italian Army (Italian: Esercito Italiano) can be divided into four "families": the Regular Uniform (the only one that includes seasonal variations), the Service Uniform, the Service Combat Uniform, and the Ceremonial Uniform. There are precise laws that regulate Armed Forces’ uniforms regarding the type of material, color and badge. These military uniforms can only be sold to verified collectors and Army personnel. Civilians are allowed to buy the ordinary uniform without the Army's coat of arms.

=== Regular uniform ===
The Regular Uniform consists of a single-breasted jacket with four buttons and four pockets. Trousers come with a classic cut and the front pleats have five pockets, one of which is for a pocket watch. The shirt worn underneath also has two small pockets. The uniform is completed with a necktie, brown leather gloves, brown shoes, khaki socks and a cap or headdress. Both summer and winter versions differ from each other in the materials that are used when making them.

=== Service uniform ===
The summer and winter Service Uniform have identical cuts and colors with the Regular uniform, while active military personnel always utilize a special headdress.

=== Combat uniform ===
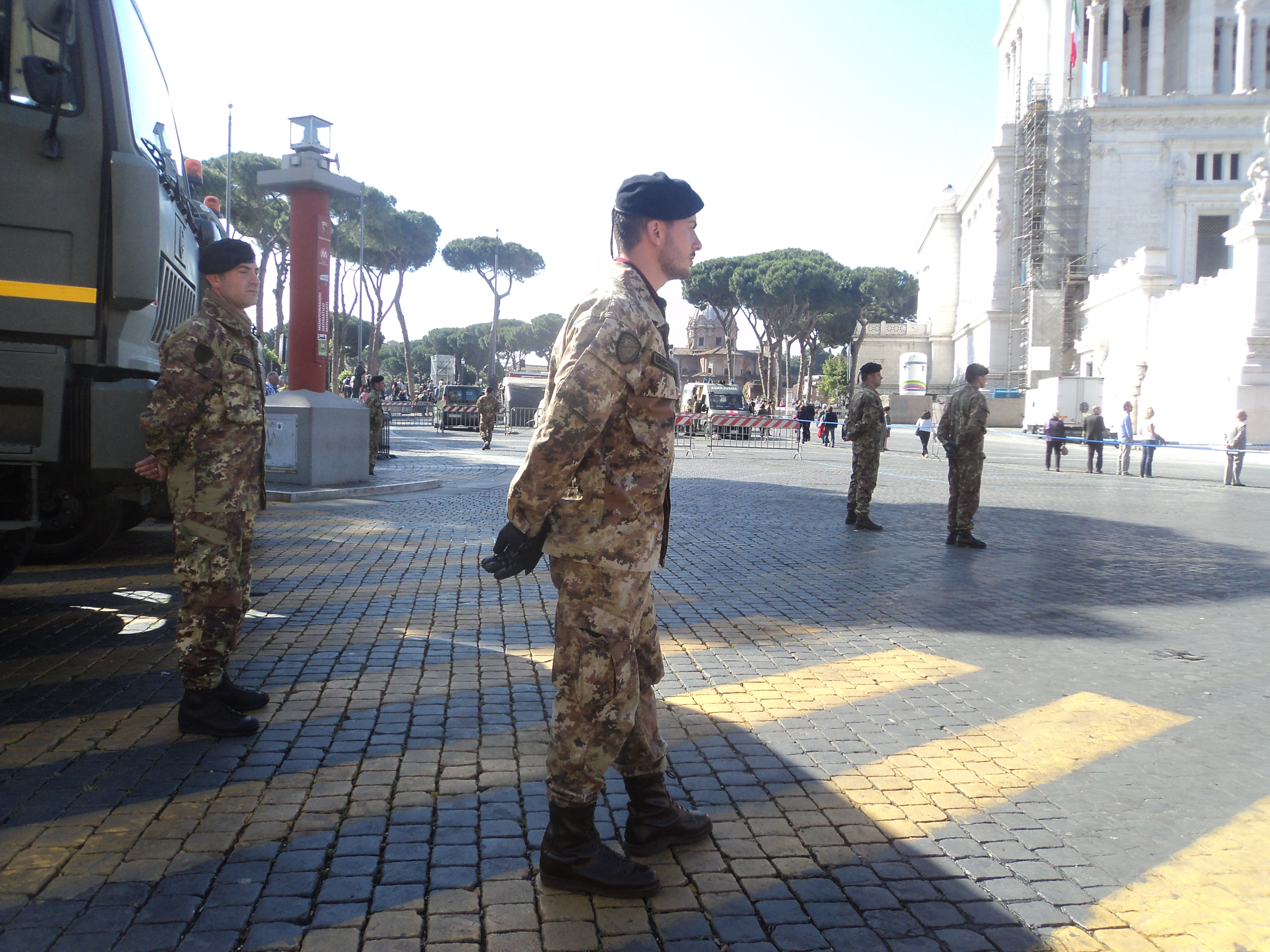
Soldiers of the Italian Army in their service combat uniform

The Service Combat Uniform is the most used uniform, and it is distributed to all soldiers with the same mimetic pattern (paratroopers have a different model with a strengthening on the shoulders). It is composed of a beret, a five button closure jacket with two internal pockets, and trousers with four pockets: two posterior and one in the middle of each thigh. Accessories completing the uniform include gloves, special footwear and a T-shirt with short or long sleeves, depending on the season. If the activity or the situation requires so, a raincoat made up of a thermo lining and a warm windbreaker are added.

The Combat version is composed of a helmet, an anti-reflection tarp, a scarf and a belt with glove compartment to the basic Service Uniform. When needed, the uniform is equipped with a bulletproof vest. Alpines troops utilize a different hat, with an eagle feather on the left side, and each unit has a different pompom color.

=== Ceremonial uniform ===
The Ceremonial Uniform includes a double-breasted jacket with six buttons and two pockets on the hips. Trousers come with a classic cut in fabric, as well as the jacket. The winter version is composed of a blue cape infantry, a black rigid cap, white gloves and black shoes. There are other accessories such as the necktie, a light blue scarf and a sabre that completes the uniform for officers (NCOs and below do not carry a sabre).

=== Historical uniforms ===
Historical uniforms are used in military schools, the military academy, NCO schools and some regiments. They recall the light blue uniforms of the Savoy army. The Armed Force's choice of headgear is the beret, used since the 1980s (adapted from the side cap), and is the most worn headdress by Italian troops. Each color or model has an historical reason and it also exists in a female version. The ribbon on the cylindrical part of the headgear differs for officers.

==== Grey-green ====
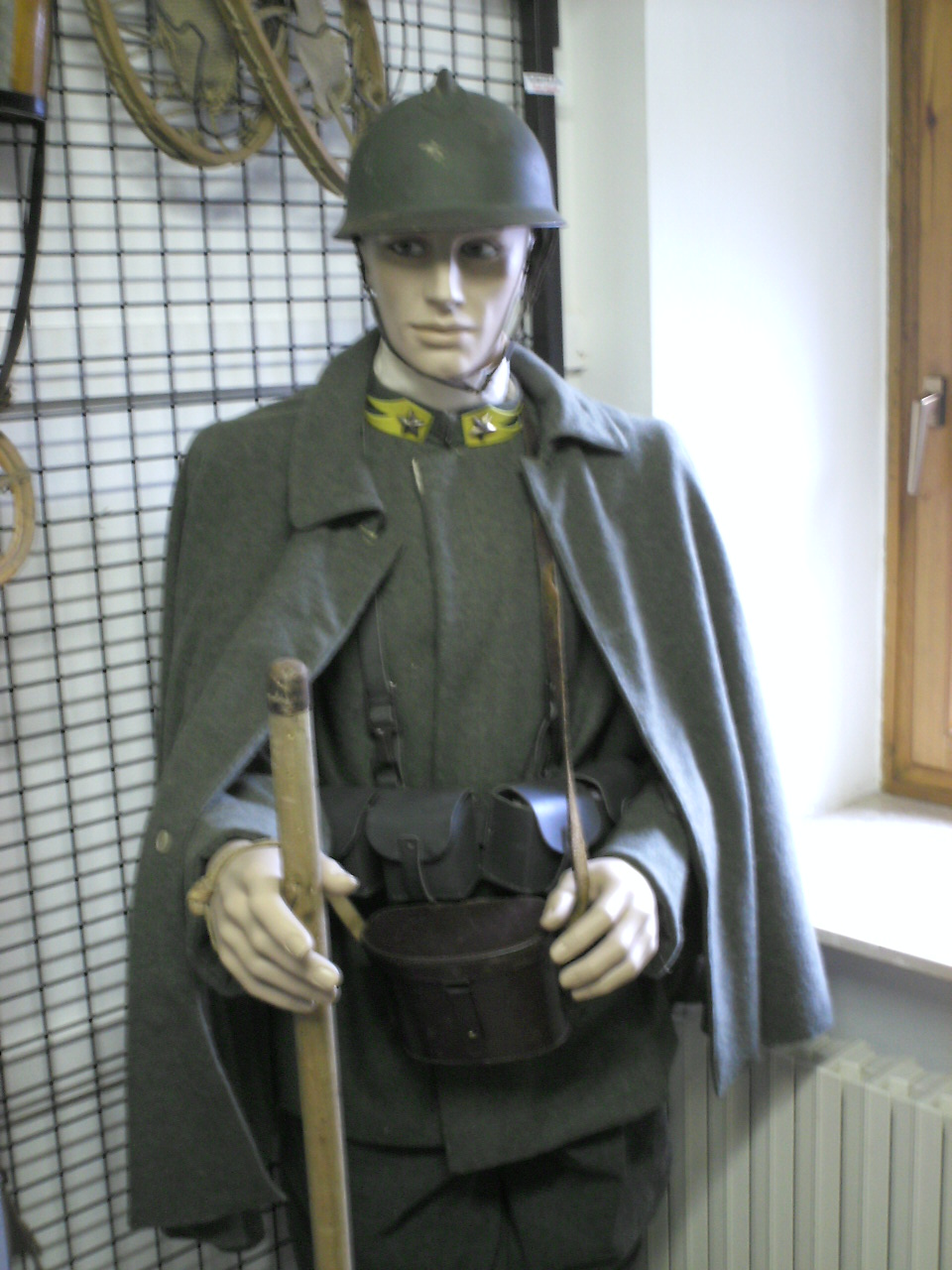
Alpini uniform from the Guardia di Finanza from the First World War

Italian military troops adopted the grey-green uniform prior to WWI in 1908. Luigi Brioschi, president of the Milanese section of the C.A.I. (Italian Alpine Club) in 1905, presented a combat uniform more suitable for modern war, replacing the showy uniforms of the Royal Sardinian Army. Brioschi demonstrated the benefits of his grey green uniform on painted targets set out at varying distances, and so the project was financed and uniforms in his "Grigioverde" were adopted December 4, 1908. Grey-green uniforms have been utilized for forty years, including in the two World Wars. Nowadays they are a symbol for the Army and some Army Corps still currently use them for special occasions.

==== Model 40 ====
It was possible to update the grey-green uniforms in order to adjust them for World War II. The officers, NCOs and troops uniforms differed from each other in the cloth's quality and workmanship. The Model 40 uniform abolished the colored or black velvet collars. Troops had a three-button jacket (known also as a sahariana), which included four patch-pockets with a central pleat closed by small buttons, and it was partially lined. Trousers were different for cavalry and infantry. They were secured on the calf by knee-length socks or by leather chaps. A cloth belt with small buttons clamped around the waist. NCOs and Officials utilized a lighter color than troops, and they were allowed to adapt their uniforms during the war.

==== Khaki ====
During the Italian War of Liberation in 1943, the personnel received khaki uniforms from the British Army, including a short jacket with a button panel in sight and two large pockets with a button and turn-up. Trousers had six pockets and they were secured to the ankles through two canvas buckles. The footwear used were long black boots that came up to the ankle. A campaign hat and pan helmet completed the uniform. The recognizable elements of the Italian khaki uniforms were the insignia and the grade emblems. Despite paratroopers preferring the khaki uniforms, they continued to wear the grey-green berets, helmets and the traditional campaign hats.

=== Special forces units ===
==== Folgore ====
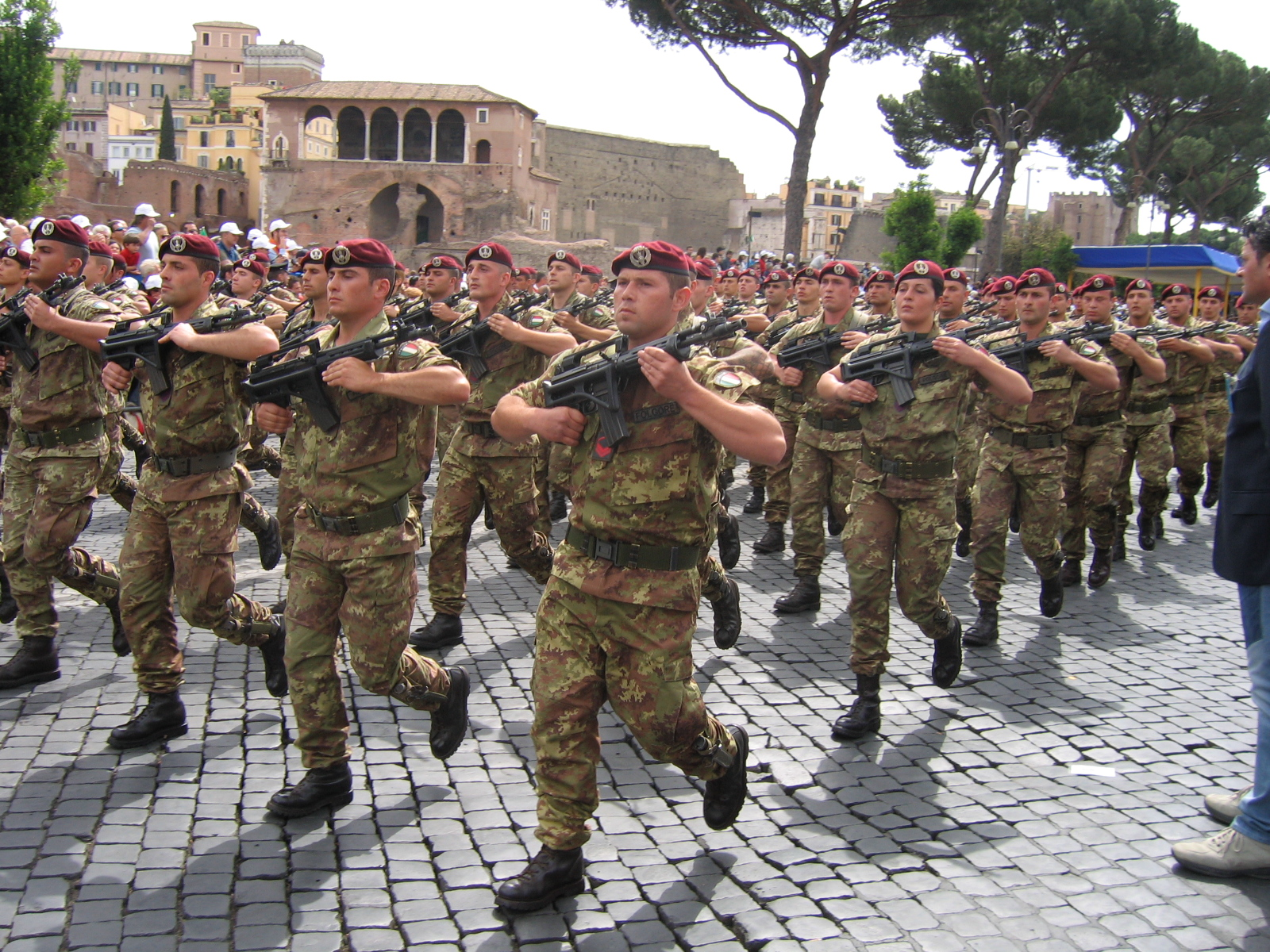
Members of Paratroopers Brigade "Folgore" are authorized to wear amaranth coloured berets as a part of their uniform

On 10 June 1967, the Paratroopers Brigade granted the name “Folgore” to the Battaglione Paracadutisti, and the beret's color subsequently changed to amaranth (a colour adopted by many paratrooper units all over the world).

==== Col Moschin ====
The Italian 9th paratrooper assault regiment is a special forces’ department of the Italian Army. In 1997, Col Moschin re-adopted the traditional insignia of the Arditi in the Great War. It was added to the bomb with a flame on the left, overlapped by two crossed daggers, the paratrooper's canopy and the right wing of the Aviotruppe's medal.

==== Granatieri di Sardegna ====
The Granatieri di Sardegna is one of the oldest regiments of infantry in the Italian army. The force originated in Sardinia is now based in Rome. This brigade of two infantry regiments and one support regiment is responsible for the guarding of the president. The regiment has its own traditional full dress uniform. The uniform is black with red ornaments and contains a big black bearskin hat almost similar to that of the British King's Guard. It holds the grenade badge, the badge of the constituent regiments.

==== Alpini ====
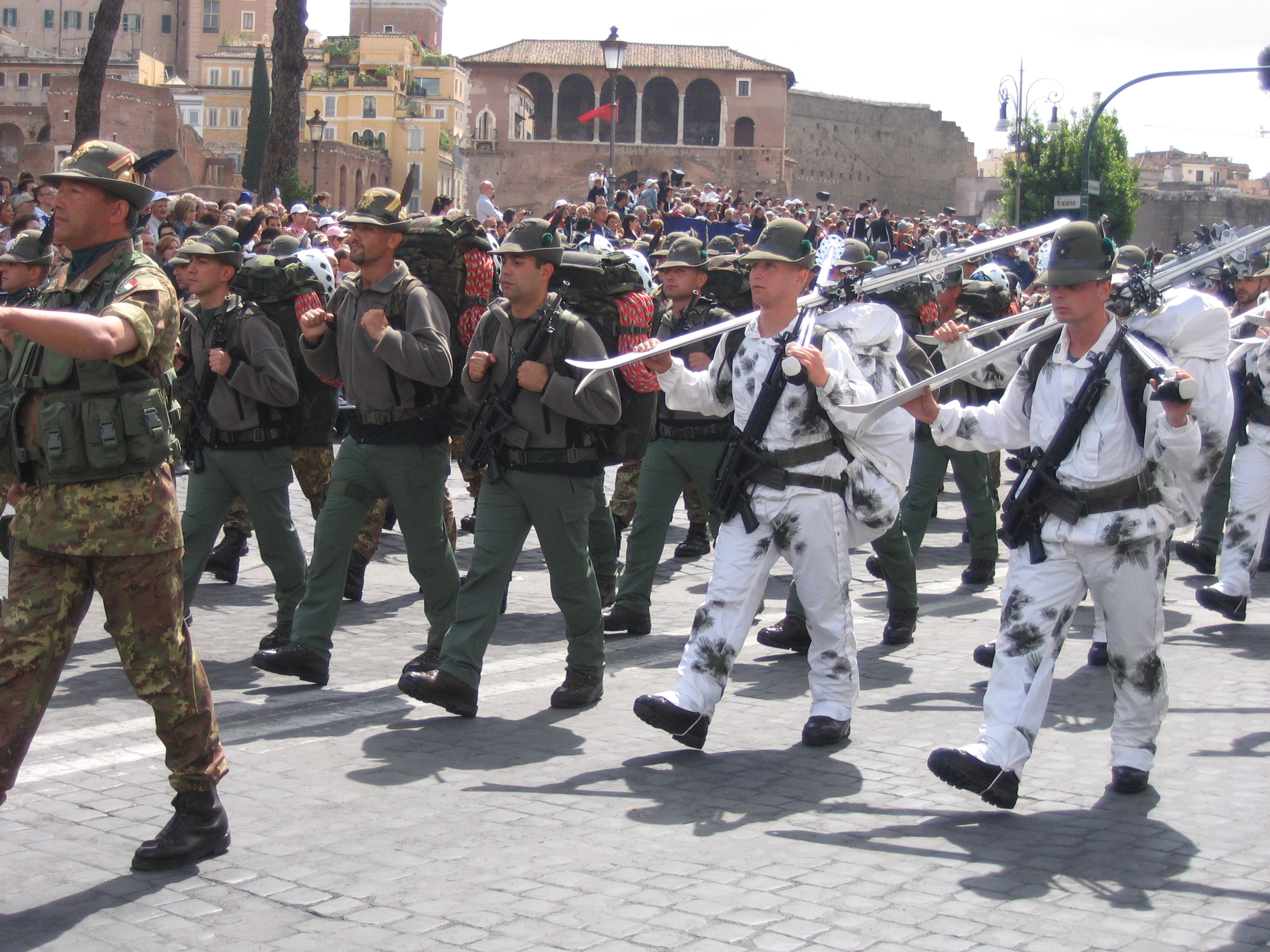
The Alpini on parade, with its soldiers wearing the Cappello Alpino, the distinctive headgear of the unit

The Alpini are the oldest mountain infantry in the world and one of the Italian special forces. A special feature of their uniform is the Cappello Alpino, that carries a black raven feather, a garment that gave this force the nickname: "The Black feathers" (Italian: "Le Penne Nere"). Officers traditionally had a white eagle feather instead of the black one. When the force was created, the hat worn was made of black felt. This was changed when the new green-grey uniform was adopted in 1909. Since then, the hat was changed to the distinctive grey felt that is currently being used. The Alpini has distinctive green cuffs on the dark blue tunics worn for full dress and barrack dress before 1915, and by the green piping on their light blue/grey trousers. When grey-green service uniforms were tried out by the Alpini in 1906, before the entire army adopted them in 1909, the distinctive green collar patches and typical headdress were retained and are still in service.

== Italian Navy ==
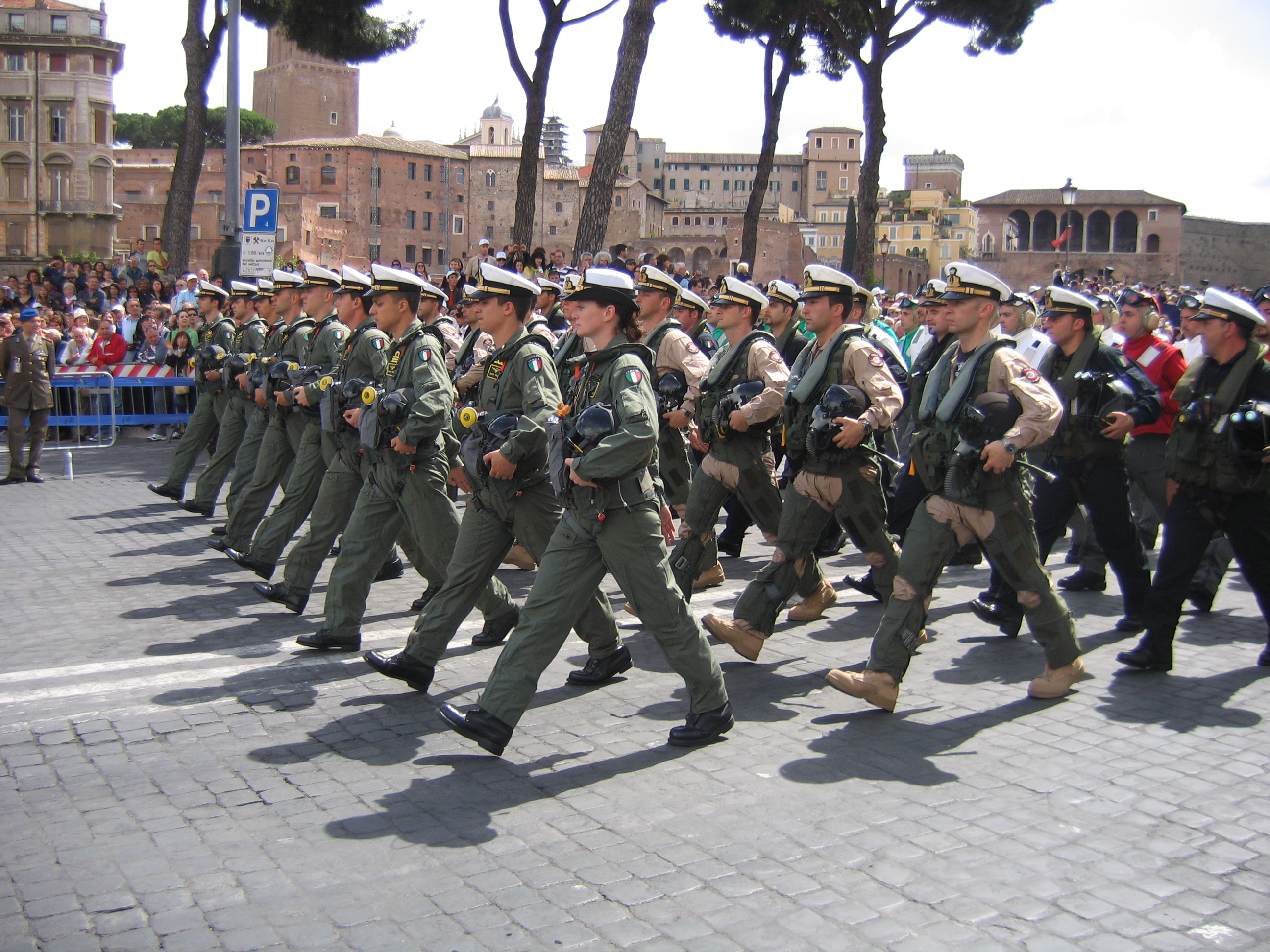
Members of the Italian Navy on parade; the first three rows donning uniforms used by naval aviators

The Italian Navy (Italian: Marina Militare) is the navy of the Italian Republic. The Italian Navy is divided into different corps: Corps of Staff Officers, Corps of Naval Engineering, Corps of the Naval Arms, Maritime Military Medical Corps for medics and for Pharmacists, Corps of Military Maritime Commissariat, Corps of the Port Captaincies and Corps of the Military Maritime Crews . Since 1861, the materials and uniforms used by the Italian Navy have been adjusted and often re-designed as the service evolved. The current uniforms are based on the Marina Militare rank system, and come with variations in rank and on a seasonal basis. The uniforms also vary depending on the location where the personnel are serving, with different uniforms for serving on ships, naval planes, submarines or land locations.

=== Design ===
The design of the uniforms is based on the rank of the personnel (officers, marshals, enlisted ratings and cadets). The uniforms change seasonally for summer and winter, and have different uniforms for the different departments of the Navy. The uniforms are also made of different textile materials. There is also an operational uniform that the Navy uses.

==== Regular uniform ====
The standard uniform used by ratings and petty officers is the same for male and female personnel, with the exception of the jacket in the winter version (six-buttons for male and a three-buttons for female personnel), and it presents two seasonal variations for summer and winter. The winter uniform is fully colored in a dark-blue, with the same color for its accessories, such as the hat's brim (the hat itself is white on top, with the MM symbol sewn on it), the gloves, shoes and tie. A white shirt is worn underneath. The female personnel are also allowed to carry a bag and substitute the classic cut trousers with a skirt. The summer uniform is composed of a short-sleeved white shirt, worn with another white T-shirt underneath, both of which are tucked into the classical-cut white trousers and tightened by a belt with a golden colored buckle. The shoes are white, as well as the hat (whose brim remains black like the winter version). As for the winter version, female personnel can carry a white bag.

==== Ceremonial uniform ====
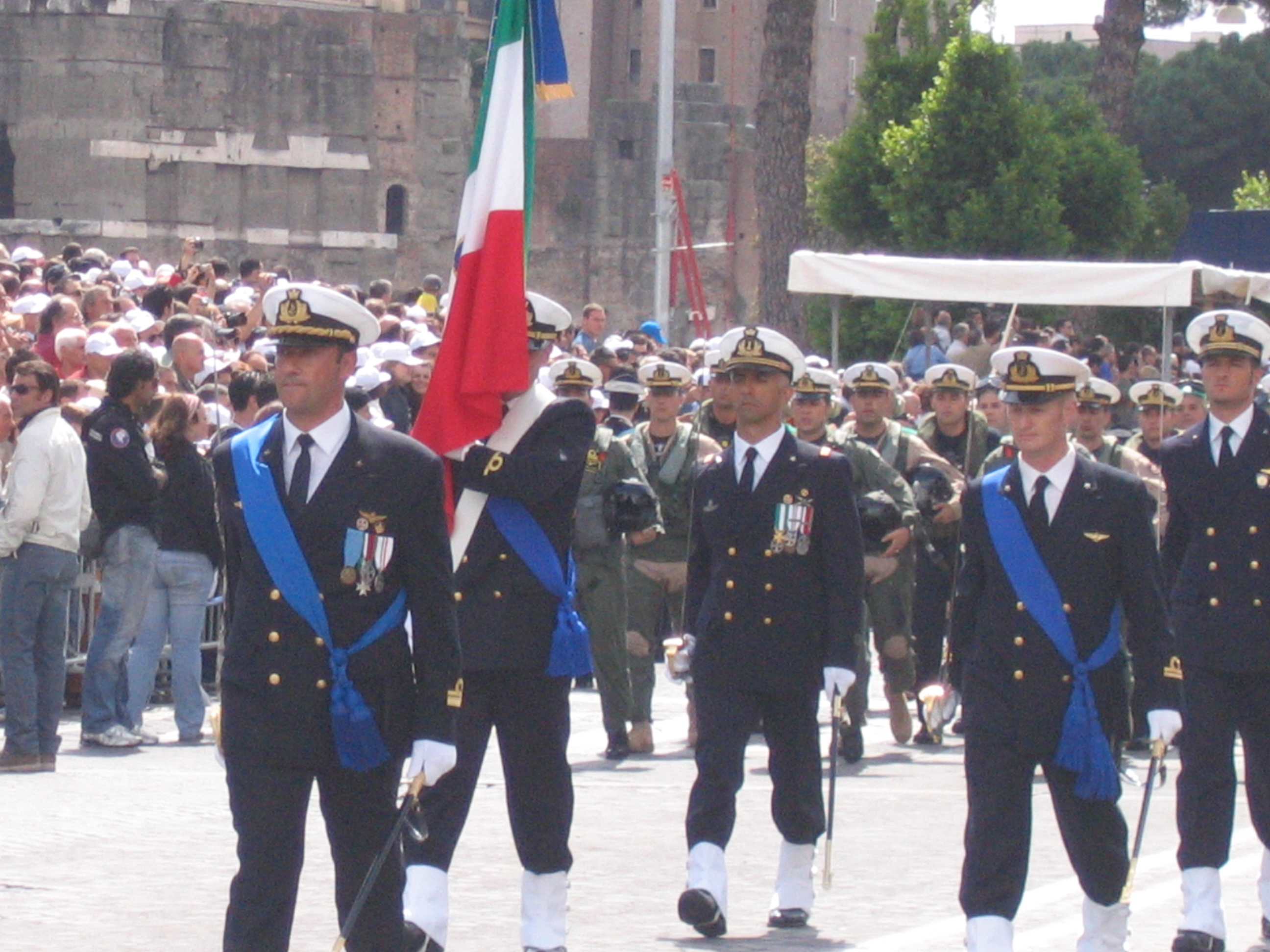
Officers of the Italian Navy in ceremonial winter uniform

The Ceremonial Uniform has two seasonal variations for summer and winter. There are some common features such as the peaked cap for officers and NCOs, which remains white on top with a black brim and the Italian Navy symbol sewn on the front; the light blue band passing from the right shoulder and tied to the opposite hip; the black shoes and a sword (for officers), the hilt of which is coloured in gold. The different variations are mainly based on the choice of the color and in the weight of the material used. The summer version is lighter and almost entirely white colored, with black and golden shoulder pads bearing rank insignia. The winter version comes with a six-button black jacket, classical cut black trousers and a white shirt worn underneath, with insignia on the cuffs. A black tie completes the uniform. Officers and petty officers wear peaked caps with this uniform (female officers and NCOs, as well as ratings, wear instead the crusher cap), junior male ratings wear the sailor cap, which is optional use for female ratings.

=== COMSUBIN uniforms ===
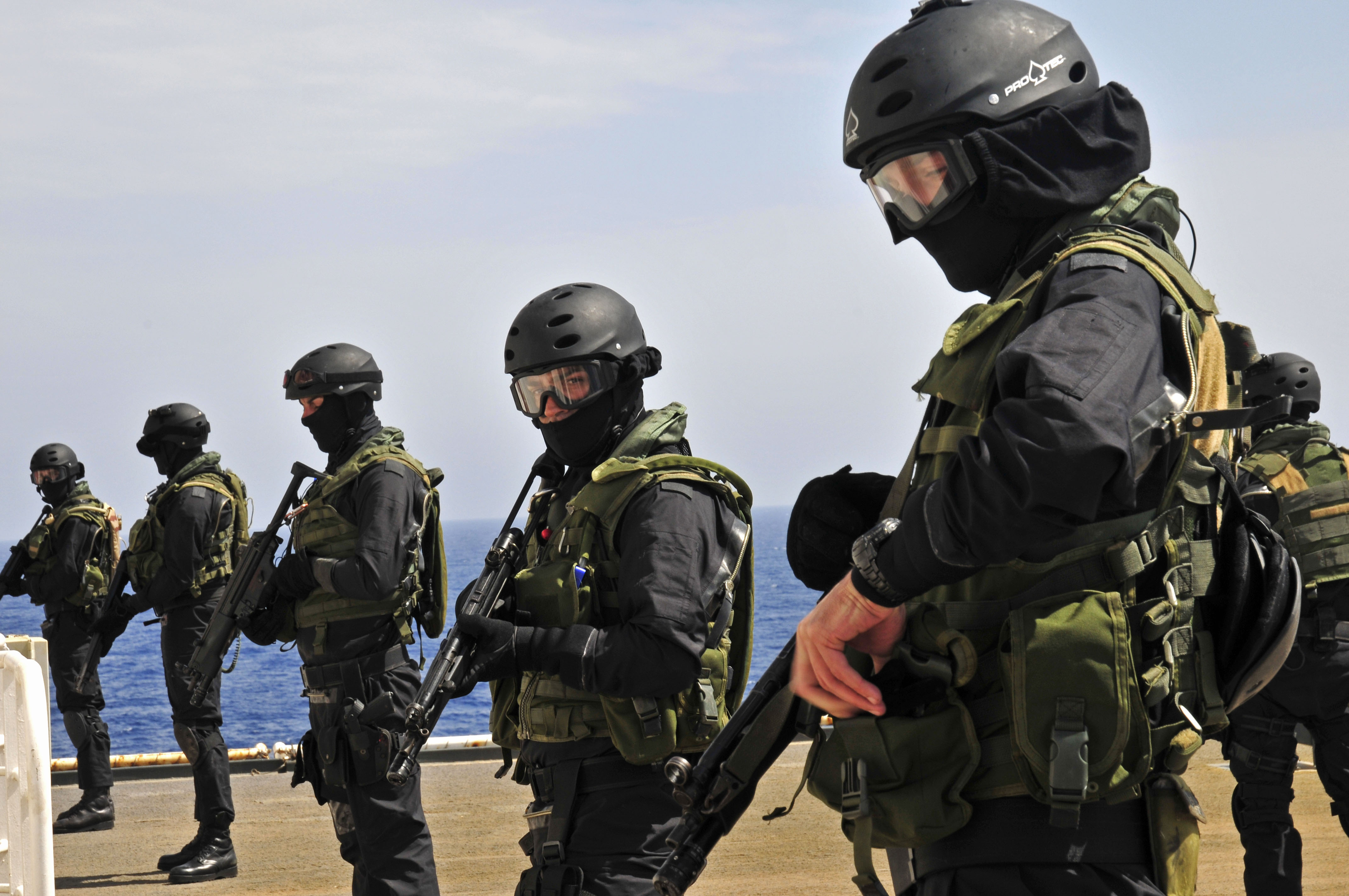
Members of COMSUBIN in operational uniforms

Comando Raggruppamento Subacquei e Incursori Teseo Tesei is the Italian Navy's special forces unit, whose uniform has several authorized differences from the standard uniforms used in the Italian Navy.

==== GOI ====
The Operational Raider Group (Italian: Gruppo Operativo Incursori; abbreviated as GOI) is part of the Italian special forces and is one of the two sections that form the COMSUBIN. The GOI have different uniforms, including a scuba diving one. After being transported in a submarine, they use diving in order to stealthily reach places while remaining undercover. Another characteristic of this uniform is the harness used for steep access and egress points above water.

==== GOS ====
The Operational Divers Group (Italian: Gruppo Operativo Subacquei, abbreviated as GOS) is a special unit that is deployed for conducting any interventions in depths (of the sea) that reach more than 1000 meters underwater. The uniform used is fully black, with transparent scuba glasses, a torch mounted on top of the helmet and two oxygen tanks attached to the back of the operator.

== Carabinieri ==
In Italy, there are two main police forces. The regular state police, the Polizia, and the Carabinieri. The Carabinieri were part of the Italian Army until the early 2000s. Since then, they are considered as an independent part of the Italian Armed Forces. The first nine written rules about Tuscany uniforms for Carabinieri date back to 9 August 1814 and recite the first design of the uniforms.

=== Design ===
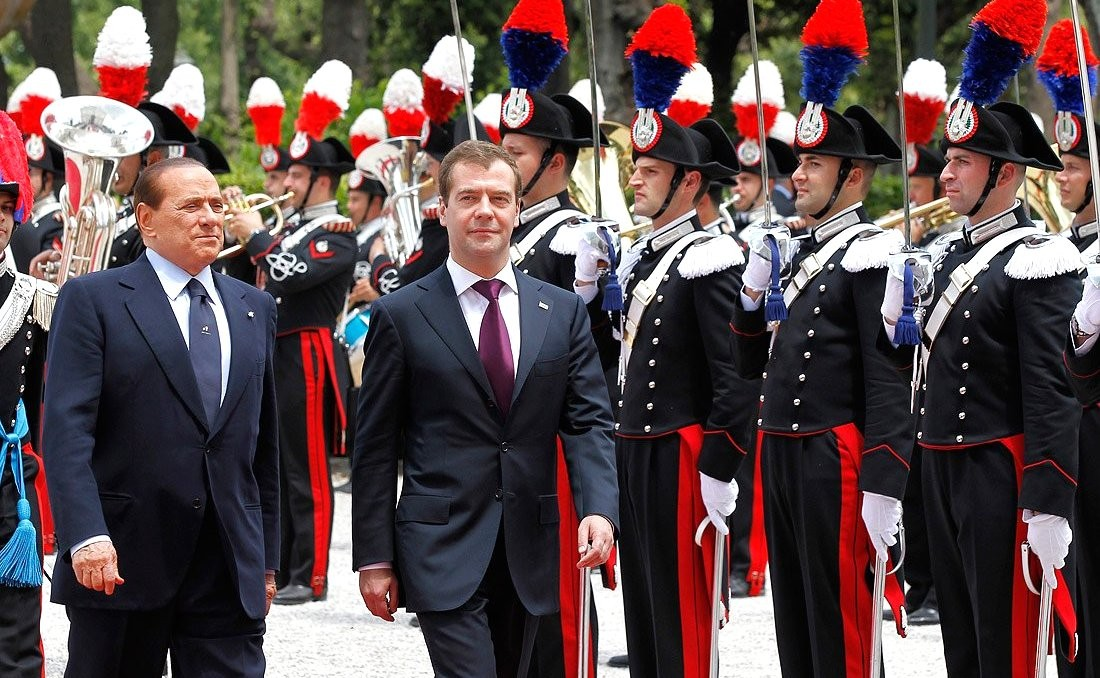
Ceremonial uniforms worn by the Carabinieri during a Russian state visit to Italy

The uniform that the Gendarmerie wore in 1814 consisted of a turquoise fabric buttoned suit with a blue collar and padded gloves. Since 1822, some small changes have been made to the uniform. Officers and Warrant Officers had silver swords and sabers, both in a black leather scabbard, worn with the dress. At the beginning of the 20th Century, the rules of the dress code were reinforced because of World War I. Troops had three different types of uniforms: the Complete uniform, the Ordinary uniform, and the Effort uniform. The Carabinieri's uniform at that time was made of a green-grey cloth material, and was used by all soldiers.

==== Ceremonial dress uniform ====
For historical and ceremonial use, the Carabinieri uniform consists of a distinctive black uniform made of silver braids around the collar and cuffs, edges trimmed in scarlet and epaulettes in silver. The fringes of the mounted division are white, and the infantry has light blue. The headgear used is the traditional two-pointed hat for Carabinieri, known as the Lucerna, also called a bicorne. During the 1980s Giorgio Armani designed the new more modern uniforms.

==== Regular uniform ====
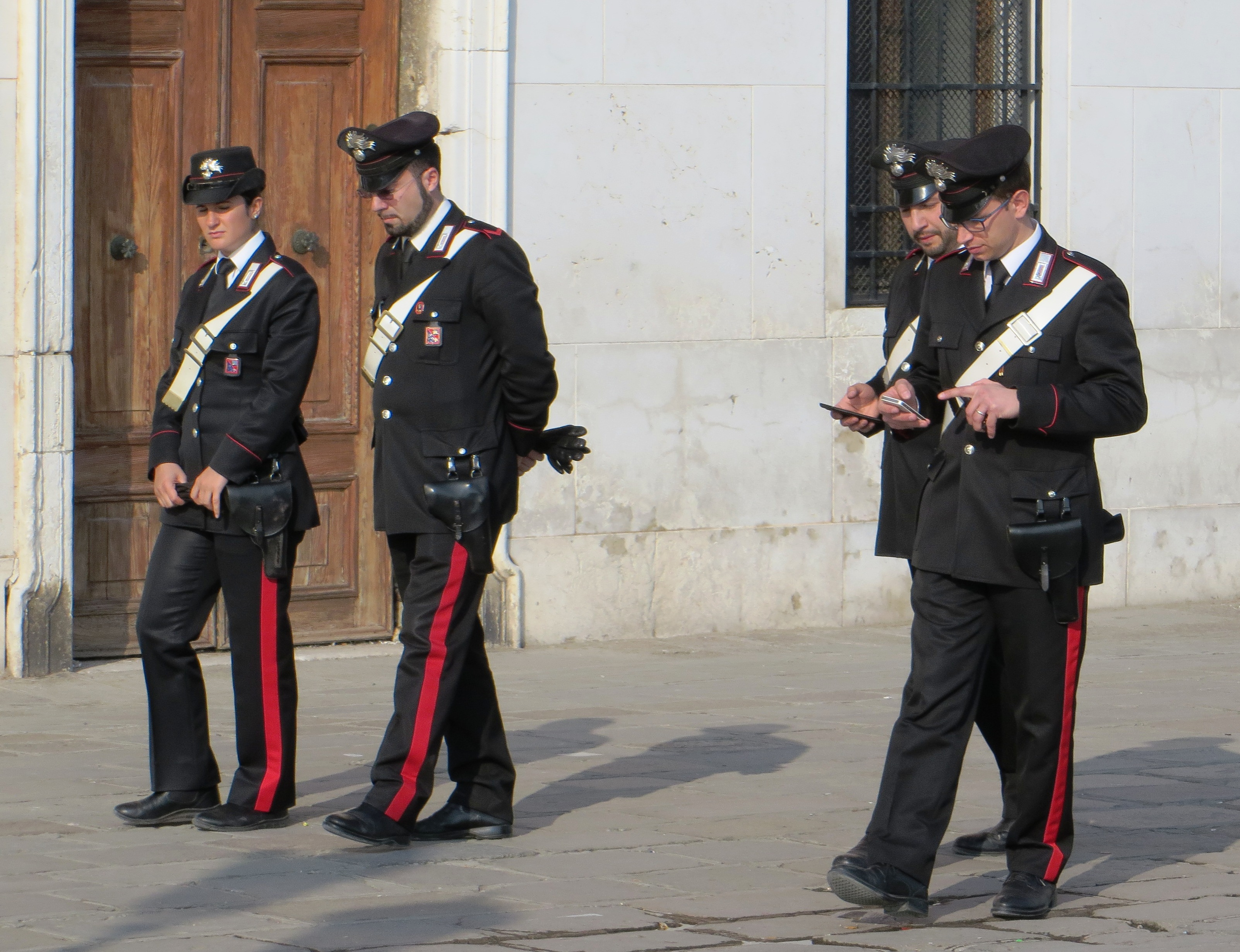
Members of the Carabinieri in their operational uniforms

The modern Carabinieri Force uniform is colored in black for every seasonal version, with small variations on weather basis (coat or wind jacket), and is composed of a four-button jacket with shoulder pads: all buttons on the uniform are silvered. The shirt underneath is white, with two pockets. The trousers have a classic cut, with four pockets and has two vertical red stripes along the outer side of both legs, stretching from the hips to the ankles. Flat black shoes are worn. The uniform is accompanied by accessories such as the black tie and, occasionally, black leather gloves. During some operational services, the shirt is in light blue. This is the most common summer uniform that can be usually be seen in spring/summer time. The headdress worn is the peaked cap, which features the official heraldic emblem.

=== Special Forces ===
Under the Carabinieri, there are also special police forces in charge with both internal and external security, each with their own uniforms.

==== GIS ====
The Carabinieri's section of Special Intervention Group (Italian: Gruppo di Intervento Speciale, abbreviated as GIS) is an anti-terrorism unit founded in 1978. The color of the uniform utilized by this élite force is usually the dark blue, even though mimetic and desert variations exist. Reinforcements such as helmets, knee pads, elbow pads or bulletproof jackets are composed of fireproof and insulating materials.

==== Calabrian and Sardinian Hunters ====
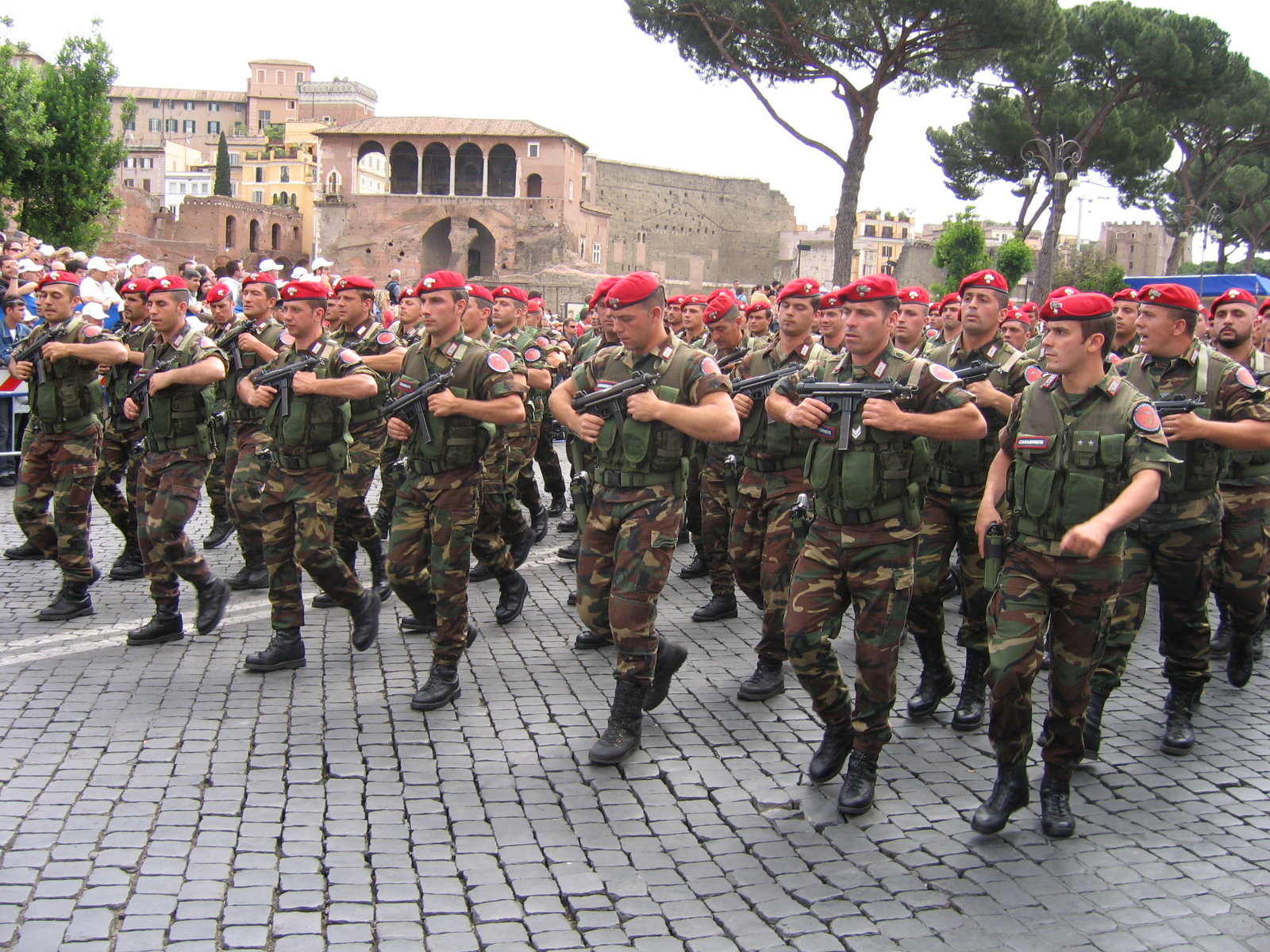
Uniforms worn by the Carabinieri Heliborne Squadron Cacciatori di Calabria includes a red-coloured beret

Calabrian and Sardinian Hunters (Italian: Cacciatori di Calabria, Cacciatori di Sardegna) are one of the special section of support for the Arma dei Carabinieri. Due to the generally milder weather and the rocky features of the southern landscape, the Hunters' uniforms consist of a lighter battle dress with a dark green camouflage pattern, together with leather gloves and combat boots. Also present with the uniform is a distinctive bright red beret, with the Carabinieri symbol sewn onto it.

==== Sicilian Hunters ====
The Sicilian Hunters (Italian: Cacciatori di Sicilia) are a special paratroop unit of the Carabinieri based in Sicily. This unit is mainly tasked to search for fugitives in the Sicilian mountains. Besides the normal Carabinieri uniforms, this troop also possesses operational uniforms like the other Hunter squadrons. The operative uniform has an extra blue neckerchief, leather gloves and combat boots.

== See also ==
- Equipment of the Italian Army
