= Carabinieri Heliborne Squadron "Cacciatori di Calabria" =

Carabinieri Squadron "Cacciatori di Calabria"
- Squadrone Carabinieri Eliportato “Cacciatori di Calabria”
- Active: 1 July 1991 - Present
- Country: Italy
- Branch: Carabinieri
- Type: Gendarmerie
- Role: Territorial control, fugitives arrest
- Size: Company; 90 to 100 troops ca.
- Part of: Calabria Operational Group
- Operations base: "Luigi Razza" Airbase, Vibo Valentia
- Motto(s): "Vigilantia de cielo, coercitio ex terra" (Surveillance from the sky, coercion from the ground)
- Beret: Red
- Mascot(s): Whisky

Commanders
- Current commander: Lt. Col. Maurizio Biasin

The Carabinieri Heliborne Squadron "Cacciatori di Calabria" (Italian: Squadrone Carabinieri Eliportato “Cacciatori di Calabria”) is a Carabinieri squadron (company-sized unit) based at the "Luigi Razza" Airbase, Vibo Valentia, Italy. The unit was established on 1 July 1991.

Carabinieri who are part of the Carabinieri Heliborne Squadron "Cacciatori di Calabria" wear the red beret.

== History ==
The Carabinieri Heliborne Squadron "Cacciatori di Calabria" traces its origins to the "squadrons" (Italian: Squadriglie), small Carabinieri patrols assigned to Aspromonte and Barbagia (in Sardinia) since 1970.

The name was chosen in reference to Garibaldi's Cacciatori delle Alpi, being inspired by the guerilla warfare tactics employed by this unit.

During 2000s the squadron performed or contributed to several important fugitives' arrests and captures, such as Giuseppe Bellocco.

== Mission ==
The Carabinieri Heliborne Squadron "Cacciatori di Calabria" has the mission to support the territorial organization in patrolling Calabria's interior regions least accessible in search for important 'ndrangheta fugitives and rural law enforcement, by combining military and police techniques.

This unit supports the Carabinieri territorial units in the fight against organized crime on the Aspromonte ground, acting in symbiosis with helicopters and canine units. Unit's particularities include sudden and fast daytime and nocturnal infiltrations in the deep heart of the mountain bumps and ambushes carried out in difficult environmental conditions waiting to capture kidnappers or fugitives.

If necessary, the squadron provides support in rescue missions in natural disasters. For particular needs, the squadron may be deployed in other Regions or support Carabinieri territorial commands.

Squadrons of the Carabinieri Heliborne Squadron "Cacciatori di Calabria" may be assigned to two different mission types: autonomous tasks and support tasks. The autonomous missions include investigations and information collections, cooperating with the relevant Carabinieri commands and stations. Support missions are preceded by an autonomous analysis, recognition and planification (together with the command requesting the support intervention). In all cases, however, the coordination between the Legion Command (regional-level) and the individual commands is constant and continuous.

=== Counter-terrorism ===
As part of the Carabinieri counter-terrorist apparatus, the Carabinieri Heliborne Squadron "Cacciatori di Calabria" provides Emergency Intervention Detachments (Italian: Aliquote di Primo Intervento); while Detachment operating in provincial capital cities depend on the relevant Provincial Command and focus their surveillance on sensitive places, Detachments of the Carabinieri Heliborne Squadron "Cacciatori di Calabria" operate both across the Calabria territory (with the exception of Reggio Calabria) and in other Regions.

In particular, Emergency Intervention Detachments of the Carabinieri Heliborne Squadron "Cacciatori di Calabria" are focused on sensitive targets such as universities, national events or rallies, meetings and conventions.

== Organization ==
The Carabinieri Heliborne Squadron "Cacciatori di Calabria" depends on the Calabria Operational Group (established on 1 September 1992), headed by the deputy commander of the Calabria Carabinieri Legion. The squadron consists of 15 Teams framed into two Platoons.

Each Teams consists of specially trained Carabinieri: specialist climbers, patrolmen, marksmen, bomb disposal experts. One Team in one Platoon consists only of specialist rock climbers, while another Team in the other Platoon consists of alpine rescue-qualified specialist rock climbers.

Admission into the Carabinieri Heliborne Squadron "Cacciatori di Calabria" is upon demand and selection, conducted also by the 1st Paratroopers Carabinieri Regiment "Tuscania"; training continues also after arriving in the squadron.

The unit is headquartered in the "Operational and Logistics Base", located in "Luigi Razza" Airbase, Vibo Valentia together with the 8th Helicopters Unit, the K-9 Unit, the Carabinieri Special Company (also dependent on the Calabria Operational Group), and the 14th Carabinieri Battalion "Calabria".

== Uniform ==
The Carabinieri Heliborne Squadron "Cacciatori di Calabria", in addition to uniforms issued to all Carabinieri, wear an Operational Uniform, consisting of camouflage battle dress (together with 1st Paratroopers Carabinieri Regiment "Tuscania", Carabinieri Cavalry Regiment, and fellow Cacciatori Squadrons). Blue neckerchief, leather gloves and combat boots complete the look.

== Weaponry ==
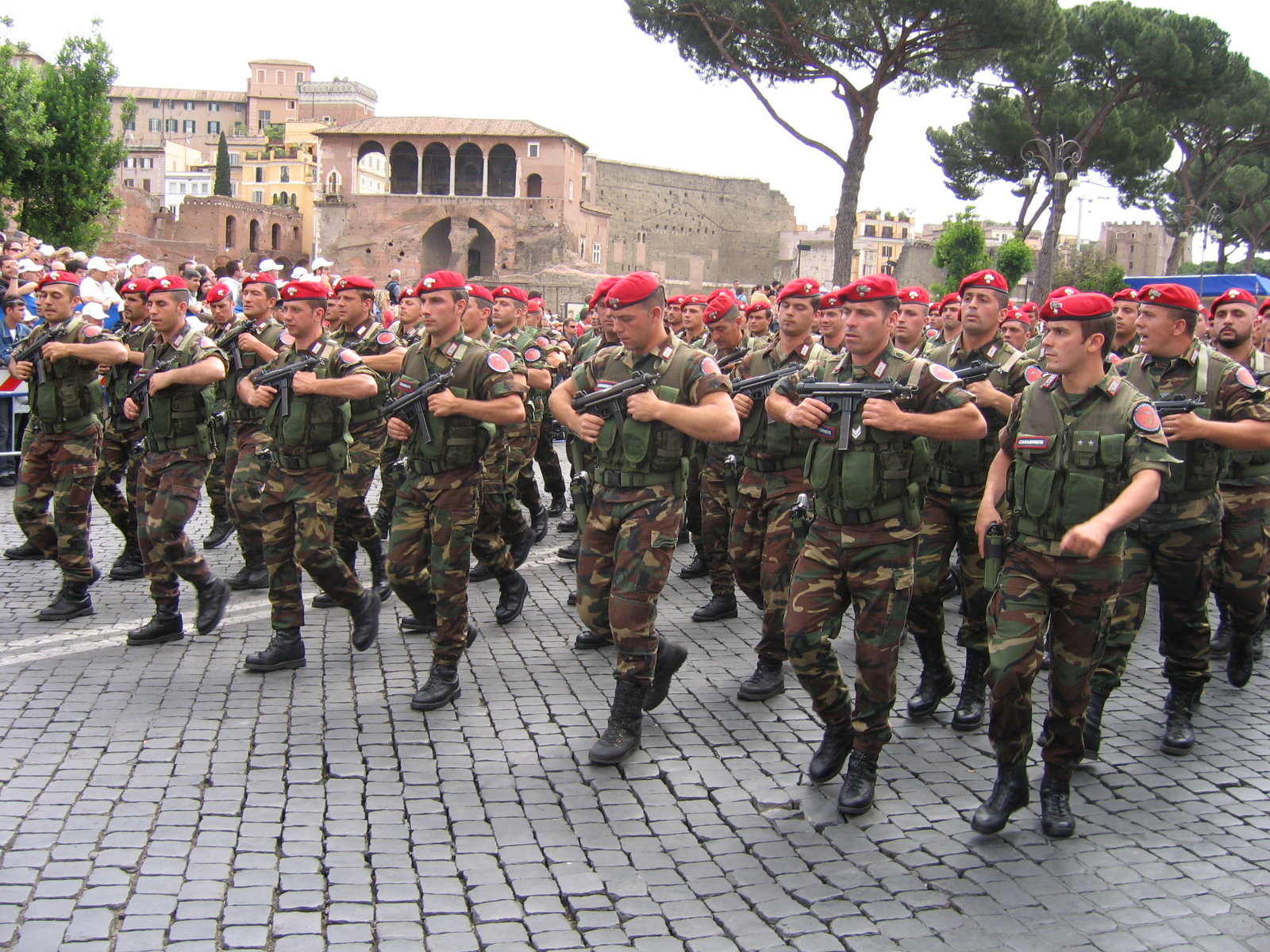
"Cacciatori di Calabria" on parade in Rome, 2 June 2006.

The Carabinieri Heliborne Squadron "Cacciatori di Calabria" uses individual and unit-level equipment and weaponry.

Unit-level weapons are submachine guns, shotguns and assault rifles. Unit weaponry include:

- Beretta PM12 S submachine gun;
- Heckler & Koch MP5A5 submachine gun;
- Heckler & Koch MP5SD3 submachine gun;
- Franchi SPAS-15 dual-mode 12 gauge combat shotgun;
- Benelli M4 Super 90 semi-automatic shotgun;
- Beretta SCP 70/90 assault rifle;
- Beretta ARX160 A3 assault rifle (11 inches-long barrel);

Heckler & Koch MP5A5 submachine guns are unit weapons assigned to an individual Carabiniere.

Personal weapons include:

- Beretta 92FS Semi-automatic pistol

== Related articles ==
- 'Ndrangheta
- Carabinieri Heliborne Squadron "Cacciatori di Sardegna"
- Carabinieri Heliborne Squadron "Cacciatori di Sicilia"
