= Carabinieri Heliborne Squadron "Cacciatori di Sicilia" =

Carabinieri Squadron "Cacciatori di Sicilia"
- Squadrone Carabinieri Eliportato “Cacciatori di Sicilia”
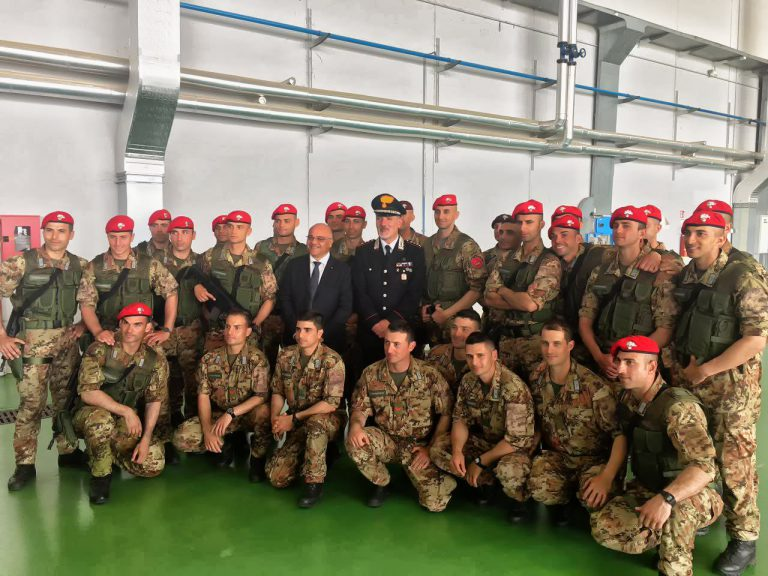
- Active: 13 May 2017 – present
- Country: Italy
- Branch: Carabinieri
- Type: Gendarmerie Special Unit Of Police Airborne Troops
- Role: Territorial control, fugitives arrest
- Size: Company; 80 troops ca.
- Part of: Carabinieri Legion "Sicilia"
- Garrison/HQ: “Cosimo di Palma” Airbase - Sigonella
- Beret: Red

Commanders
- Current commander: col. Matteo Corciulo

The Carabinieri Heliborne Squadron "Cacciatori di Sicilia" (Italian: Squadrone Carabinieri Eliportato “Cacciatori di Sicilia”) is a Carabinieri squadron (company-sized unit) based at the “Cosimo di Palma” Airbase, in Lentini, Italy. The unit was established on 13 May 2017.

According to Italian Minister of Interior Marco Minniti, the rationale of the establishment of the Carabinieri Squadron is to enforce the control projection capability on the Italian national territory; according to Italian Minister of Defence Roberta Pinotti, the establishment of the Carabinieri Squadron is due to the blending between internal and external security. Also opposition members of parliament of the Movimento 5 Stelle expressed support to the squadron.

Carabinieri who are part of the Carabinieri Heliborne Squadron "Cacciatori di Sicilia" wear the red beret.

== Mission ==
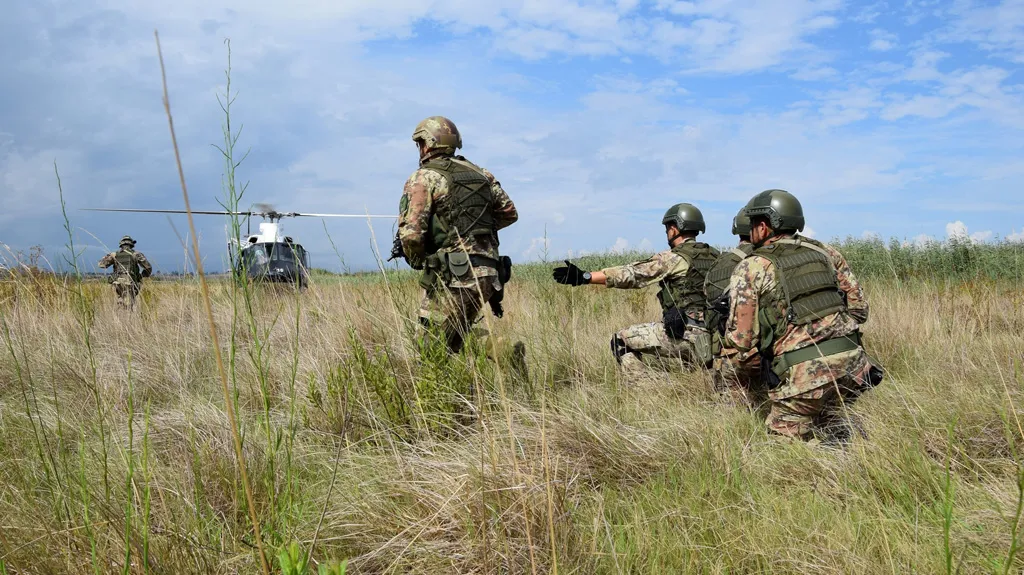
Carabinieri Heliborne Squadron "Cacciatori di Sicilia"

The Carabinieri Heliborne Squadron "Cacciatori di Sicilia" has the mission to support the territorial organization in patrolling Sicily's interior regions least accessible in search for important Mafia fugitives and rural law enforcement, by combining military and police techniques. In particular, the Carabinieri Heliborne Squadron "Cacciatori di Sicilia" patrols mountain areas, such as Nebrodi, Peloritani, and Madonie, also against arsonists.

If necessary, the squadron provides support in rescue missions in natural disasters. For particular needs, the squadron may be deployed in other Regions or support Carabinieri territorial commands.

The 80-troops strong Squadron was established on the basis of the similar Carabinieri Squadrons "Cacciatori di Calabria" (operating in Calabria) and "Cacciatori di Sardegna" (operating in Sardinia).

== Operational methodology ==
The Cacciatori professional profile provides for counter-guerrilla warfare techniques typical of special operations units with the support of helicopters, as well as the availability of advanced technology equipment, including apparatuses of individual satellite location, useful in mountain environments.

== Organization ==
The Carabinieri Heliborne Squadron "Cacciatori di Sicilia" is 60 troops strong. The unit consists of two "Cacciatori" Platoons, in turn consisting of four Teams of six Carabinieri each.

The squadron depends on the deputy commander of the Carabinieri Legion "Sicilia". The squadron is supported by the 12th Carabinieri helicopter detachment of Catania Fontanarossa.

== Equipment ==
=== Uniform ===
The Carabinieri Heliborne Squadron "Cacciatori di Sicilia", in addition to uniforms issued to all Carabinieri, wear an Operational Uniform, consisting of camouflage battle dress (together with 1st Paratroopers Carabinieri Regiment "Tuscania", Carabinieri Cavalry Regiment, and fellow Cacciatori Squadrons). Blue neckerchief, leather gloves and combat boots complete the look.

=== Weaponry ===
The Carabinieri Heliborne Squadron "Cacciatori di Sicilia" has weaponry typical of reconnaissance units:

- Beretta 92 FS semi-automatic pistol;
- Beretta M12S submachine gun;
- Heckler & Koch MP5 A5 and SD3 submachine gun;
- Franchi SPAS-15 MIL combat shotgun;
- Beretta ARX 160-A3 assault rifle.

Snipers and marksmen have precision rifles:

- Accuracy International AW Sniper;
- Mauser sp 66.

== Related articles ==
- Cosa Nostra
- Carabinieri Heliborne Squadron "Cacciatori di Sardegna"
- Carabinieri Heliborne Squadron "Cacciatori di Calabria"
