= Carabinieri Foreign Ministry Command =

- Comando Carabinieri Ministero Affari Esteri
- Active: 15 September 1979–present
- Country: Italy
- Branch: Carabinieri
- Type: Gendarmerie
- Role: Diplomatic security
- Part of: Specialists and Mobile Units Command
- Garrison/HQ: Rome, Palazzo della Farnesina

Commanders
- Current commander: Gen. D. Andrea Rispoli

The Carabinieri Foreign Ministry Command (Italian: Comando Carabinieri Ministero Affari Esteri, officially shortened in CDO CC MAE) is the Carabinieri unit in charge for providing security and services to the Italian Ministry of Foreign Affairs.

== History ==
The first documents relating to the presence of the Carabinieri within the Ministry of Foreign Affairs date back to 1946. However, the history of the Carabinieri Foreign Ministry Command dates back to 1979.

Before the establishment of the dedicated Carabinieri organisation of the Foreign Affairs Ministry, two Carabinieri units with duties related to the foreign affairs functioned: the Carabinieri MAE detachment, which performed duties of surveillance, security, cypher, and courier service, and the Carabinieri Emigration Unit, assigned to the emigration affairs. Until 1963, the units were at the disciplinary dependencies of the Carabinieri Legion of Rome, when they were transferred to the Special Units Department.

=== 1979 - 1989 ===
The "Carabinieri Unit of Foreign Affairs" was established on 15 September 1979, pursuant to Law No. 838 of 27 December 1973. The Unit was placed under the functional dependencies of the Minister of Foreign Affairs and under the disciplinary dependencies of the Carabinieri Legion of Rome.

The Unit was organised on a Command Nucleus, a Surveillance Nucleus, a Security Nucleus and an Emigration Nucleus on which six Sub-nucleus depended. On 15 February 1982 the Unit was reorganised. The Security Nucleus passed under the command of the Commander of the Emigration Nucleus and the latter also assumed the role of Deputy Commander.

On 1 May 1982, the Unit, now commanded by a Colonel, was initially placed within the VI Brigade; subsequently, on 15 November 1987, it passed under the XII Brigade, assuming the current name of Carabinieri Command Ministry of Foreign Affairs.

=== 1989 - 2000 ===
From 3 November 1992, the Command was attributed to the command of a Brigadier General.

On 1 September 1996 the Command was reorganised. A Command Office and a Security and Surveillance Office were established. The Command Office included an Operations and Logistics Section and a Secretariat and Personnel Section, while the Security and Surveillance Office was divided into a Headquarters team and a Foreign team. In 1998, the Security and Surveillance Office was transformed into a Unit and organised into two sections.

In 1999, the Command was placed under the functional dependencies of the Minister of Foreign Affairs, through the Secretary-General of the Ministry.

=== 2001 – present ===
In 2001, with the transformation of the Carabinieri into an autonomous Service, the XII Brigade was transformed into the Carabinieri Specialist Units Division. On 1 January 2004, while remaining at the disciplinary dependence of the Specialist Units Division, the leadership of the Carabinieri Ministry of Foreign Affairs Command was assigned to a Division General.

On 1 December 2009, the Command passed under the direct command of the Specialists and Mobile Units Command. On 1 April 2016, a secretariat was set up, reporting directly to the Commander.

== Mission ==
The activity of the Carabinieri Command of the Ministry of Foreign Affairs includes numerous aspects: the Command provides security and surveillance of the headquarters of the Ministry of Foreign Affairs, security and surveillance of foreign offices and participates in the activities of the Ministry.

The security and surveillance tasks concern the interior of the ministerial building, where around 4000 people are monitored every day. Over the years, surveillance has also been extended to Villa Madama, the representative seat of the Minister of Foreign Affairs, and to Palazzo Borromeo, which houses the Embassy of Italy to the Holy See.

The diplomatic activities are integrated by special Carabinieri personnel included in the various Directorates General, in the General Secretariat, in the Inspectorate General, in the Crisis Unit and in the Diplomatic Ceremonial of the Republic.

The main activity is diplomatic security. Abroad, the command is present in 125 diplomatic posts, where the military guarantees the security framework in diplomatic missions. According to the Ministry of Foreign Affairs, the Italian diplomatic offices abroad are manned by 377 Carabinieri, to which are to be added 93 units in service at the offices of the military attachés; finally, 152 Carabinieri are employed in the 14 high-risk offices, with the duties of protection and escort of the Ambassador and diplomatic officials.

According to Andrea Rispoli, Carabinieri deployed in high-risk diplomatic offices are drawn from 1st Carabinieri Paratroopers Regiment "Tuscania", 7th Carabinieri Regiment "Trentino Alto-Adige" and 13th Carabinieri Regiment "Friuli Veneia Giulia" from the 2nd Carabinieri Mobile Brigade.

== Organisation ==
The Command is divided into:

- Command Office;
  - Staff section;
  - Operations and Logistics Section;
- Security and Surveillance Unit;
  - Headquarters section;
  - Foreign Section;
- Secretariat of the Commanding General.

The current Commander is Divisional General Andrea Rispoli.

== See also ==
- Marine Security Guard
