= 7th Carabinieri Regiment "Trentino Alto-Adige" =

Military unit

- Active: 1920-1943; 1945-present
- Country: Italy
- Branch: Carabinieri
- Type: Gendarmerie
- Role: Military police
- Size: Regiment
- Part of: 2nd Carabinieri Mobile Brigade
- Garrison/HQ: "Federico Guella" Barracks, Laives
- Engagements: 27th G8 summit

Commanders
- Current commander: Col. Michele Facciorusso

The 7th Carabinieri Regiment "Trentino Alto-Adige" (Italian: 7° Reggimento Carabinieri "Trentino Alto-Adige") is a mobile unit of the Italian Carabinieri. The unit is framed within the 2nd Carabinieri Mobile Brigade and it is headquartered in Laives.

== History ==
While the VII Carabinieri Battalion was established for the first time in 1920, as riot control unit of the Carabinieri Legion of Rome, the origins of the 7th Carabinieri Regiment "Trentino Alto-Adige" in its present form could be tracked back to the establishment of the XI Carabinieri Mechanized Brigade in 1963.

=== 1920-1943 ===
The earliest establishment of the 7th Carabinieri Regiment "Trentino Alto-Adige" dates back to early 1920s when, during the general reorganization of the Carabinieri, several Mobile Battalions were established. The Legion of Rome established in 1920 the "Battaglione Mobile Carabinieri Roma 2" with riot control duties. In 1923 the Battalion was renamed as 7th Carabinieri Mobile Battalion. The Battalion survived the following disestablishments and reorganizations of the mobile component of the Carabinieri, despite repeated name changes.

In 1940 the Battalion was sent into Albania as a fighting unit in the Balkan Campaign, and in 1941 it was moved to Cephalonia as part of Aqui Division. During the massacre of the Acqui Division, three officers and 20 Carabinieri were executed. For the massacre, one gold medal for military valour, five silver medals for military valour and two bronze medals for military valour were awarded.

Following the Armistice of Cassibile, the Battalion was officially disestablished on 24 September 1943.

=== 1945-present ===
In 1945 the 7th Carabinieri Mobile Battalion was reestablished with internal defence duties, garrisoned in Rome.

In 1963, with the 1960s Army and Carabinieri reorganization, the XI Carabinieri Mechanized Brigade was established directly under the General Command, in order to cope with the internal territorial defence needs. The newly formed Mechanized Brigade exercised its operational and training authority on:

- 1st Carabinieri Regiment (HQ Milan): commanding I, II, III and IV Battalions;
- 2nd Carabinieri Regiment (HQ Rome): commanding V, VI, VIII and IX Battalions;
- 3rd Carabinieri Regiment (HQ Naples): commanding X, XI and XII Battalions;
- 4th Mounted Carabinieri Regiment (HQ Rome) with 2 Squadrons Groups (Battalion-level units) and 1 Armoured-motorized Squadron;
- VII Battalion (directly under the Brigade Command), under IV Army Corps (i.e. the Alpine Army Corps); despite being the newest Battalion, the unit inherited traditions and number of the second battalion of Rome, which was disestablished in 1943.
- XIII Battalion (directly under the Brigade Command), under V Army Corps.

The VII Battalion was moved from Rome to Laives in "Federico Guella" Barracks.

Each Carabinieri Battalion was led by a Lieutenant Colonel or a Major and consisted of: 1 Command Company (1 Command Platoon, 1 Services Platoon, 1 Scouts Platoon), 2 Rifle Companies (command platoon, 3 rifle platoons, 1 company weapons platoon each), 1 Mortars Company and 1 Tanks Company (Command Platoon, 3 Tanks Platoons). It was therefore a robust tactical complex. The Carabinieri Battalions had to be used only when the police and the local organization of the Carabinieri they had found insufficient, in order not to deprive the General Command of a valuable combat tool.

Within the VII Battalion, based in Laives, the Counter-terrorism Special Company was established in 1960s to counter South Tyrolean terrorism.^{p. 187} Both VII and XIII Battalions were to be always maintained at their full wartime force.

Between 1973 and 1976, the 5th Carabinieri Regiment (HQ Mestre) also existed, including IV, VII and XIII Battalions. Overall, Carabinieri Battalions were divided into two groups, according to the main type (motorized or mechanized unit) of unit the unit deployed. In 1976 the VII Battalion was granted the War Flag (the only Carabinieri Battalion to being granted the Warflag together the XIII Battalion), and on 1 February 1978 the VII Battalion was renamed 7th Carabinieri Battalion "Trentino Alto Adige".

Even during Years of Lead 7th and 13th Battalions maintained their military capabilities and were transferred under direct Army operational control.

In the 1976 Friuli earthquake, the XIII Carabinieri Battalion "Friuli Venezia Giulia", IV Carabinieri Battalion "Veneto" and VII Carabinieri Battalion "Trentino Alto Adige" intervened paying rescue and providing police and utility services. In the 1980 Irpinia earthquake Carabinieri Battalions from Bari, Naples and Rome also intervened.^{pp. 203–204}

In 1990, the 7th Carabinieri Battalion gained independence from IV Army Corps in Bolzano, while in 1996 the Battalion was officially tasked with missions abroad, in addition to its other duties.

In 2000 the Carabinieri were separated from the Italian Army and were established as autonomous Armed Force and the Mobile Units Command was elevated from Brigade to Divisional level. On 15 September 2001, Carabinieri units designed to carry out duties related to military missions abroad were grouped in the 2nd Carabinieri Mobile Brigade; on the same occasion, the 7th Carabinieri Battalion was elevated to Regimental status, while it was moved under the 2nd Carabinieri Mobile Brigade in 2003. Colonel Michele Facciorusso has been the Regimental commander since 2015.

== Deployments abroad ==
While the unit has been deployed on national territory for both civil defence and police duties since its inception, the 7th Carabinieri Regiment "Trentino Alto-Adige" has been deployed abroad since 1982:

- 1982 Lebanon (UNIFIL; military police platoon);
- 1991 Albania;
- 1996 Bosnia-Herzegovina;
- 1997 Albania;
- 1997 Bosnia-Herzegovina;
- 1999 Albania;
- 1999 Kosovo;
- 1999 Kosovo;
- 1999 Albania;
- 2001 Ethiopia, Eritrea (United Nations Mission in Ethiopia and Eritrea);
- 2001 North Macedonia (Operation Essential Harvest);
- 2002 Bosnia-Herzegovina;
- 2003 Afghanistan (Operation "Enduring Freedom");
- 2003 Afghanistan;
- 2003 Iraq (Operation Ancient Babylon - within MSU);
- 2005 Pakistan;
- 2005 Algeria;
- 2006 Colombia;
- 2006 Lebanon;
- 2008 Yemen;
- 2008 Democratic Republic of the Congo;
- 2008 Saudi Arabia;
- 2011 Police Operational Mentoring Liaison Teams/Police Advisor Teams;
- 2011 Saudi Arabia;
- 2011 Pakistan;
- 2011 Afghanistan;
- 2012 Jerusalem;
- 2013 MIADIT Djibouti;
- 2014 MIADIT Palestinian National Authority;
- 2014 EUTM Somalia;
- 2015 Lebanon.

== Mission ==
As the other units of the 2nd Carabinieri Mobile Brigade is tasked with fulfillment of missions abroad, with duties ranging from military police to riot control. Deployments abroad also includes the deployment of Close Protection Team, in order to protect Ambassadors and Consuls General in high-risk embassies.

== Training ==
In order to gain access to the Regiment, volunteer Carabinieri must pass a physical selection test. After that, staff will have to face and pass a 15-week access course, divided into 2 phases.

The first six-week basic phase gives operators skills in individual combat, weapons and shooting techniques, immediate automatic reactions, physical education, riot control, military police, topography, CRBN, first aid, Counter-IED techniques, international humanitarian law, Humint.

The advanced phase lasts nine weeks and gives operators skills in tactical military techniques, weapons techniques, close quarter battle, close quarter combat, LCB, advanced military and police shooting training, topography - night land navigation/orienteering and topographic marches in non-permissive mountain environment, patrols, guerilla and counter-guerilla warfare, garrison exercises, ordinary fire assault training, pre-training for employment at diplomatic offices.

== Organization ==
Nowadays, the 7th Carabinieri Regiment "Trentino Alto-Adige" consists of 3 operational Companies and 1 Command and Services Company.

== Uniforms ==
In addition to Ordinary and Service Uniforms, Carabinieri personnel of the 7th Carabinieri Regiment "Trentino Alto-Adige" wear two uniforms. The "Rip-Stop" uniform is a ripstop midnight blue combat dress, different from operational suit for riot control used by units of the 1st Carabinieri Mobile Brigade. The other uniform is the polychrome combat dress uniform of the Italian Army.

After the completion of the training, Carabinieri of the Regiment are awarded of the black beret with a burnished Carabinieri flame. The beret is worn on all uniform types.

== Coat of arms ==
The coat of arms of the 7th Carabinieri Regiment "Trentino Alto-Adige" is blazoned as follows:

Swiss escutcheon party per pale Azure and Gules, bordure Or. On the escutcheon, the script "2ª BRIGATA MOBILE CARABINIERI". In the Fess Point, a Roman gladius Argent, surmounted by the grenade of the Arm and an eagle descending, all of the same. The grenade bears the number "7°" Sable.

== See also ==
- 1st Carabinieri Mobile Brigade
- 2nd Carabinieri Mobile Brigade
- 1st Paratroopers Carabinieri Regiment "Tuscania"
- 13th Carabinieri Regiment
- Gruppo di intervento speciale
