= MAECI =

MAECI may refer to:

- Global Affairs Canada, formerly known as the Department of Foreign Affairs and International Trade (French: Ministère des Affaires étrangères et du Commerce international)
- Ministry of Foreign Affairs (Italy) (Ministry of Foreign Affairs and International Cooperation; Italian: Ministero degli affari esteri e della cooperazione internazionale)
