= Ministry of Foreign Affairs (Italy) =

Government ministry of Italy

Ministry of Foreign Affairs and International Cooperation
- Ministero degli affari esteri e della cooperazione internazionale MAECI
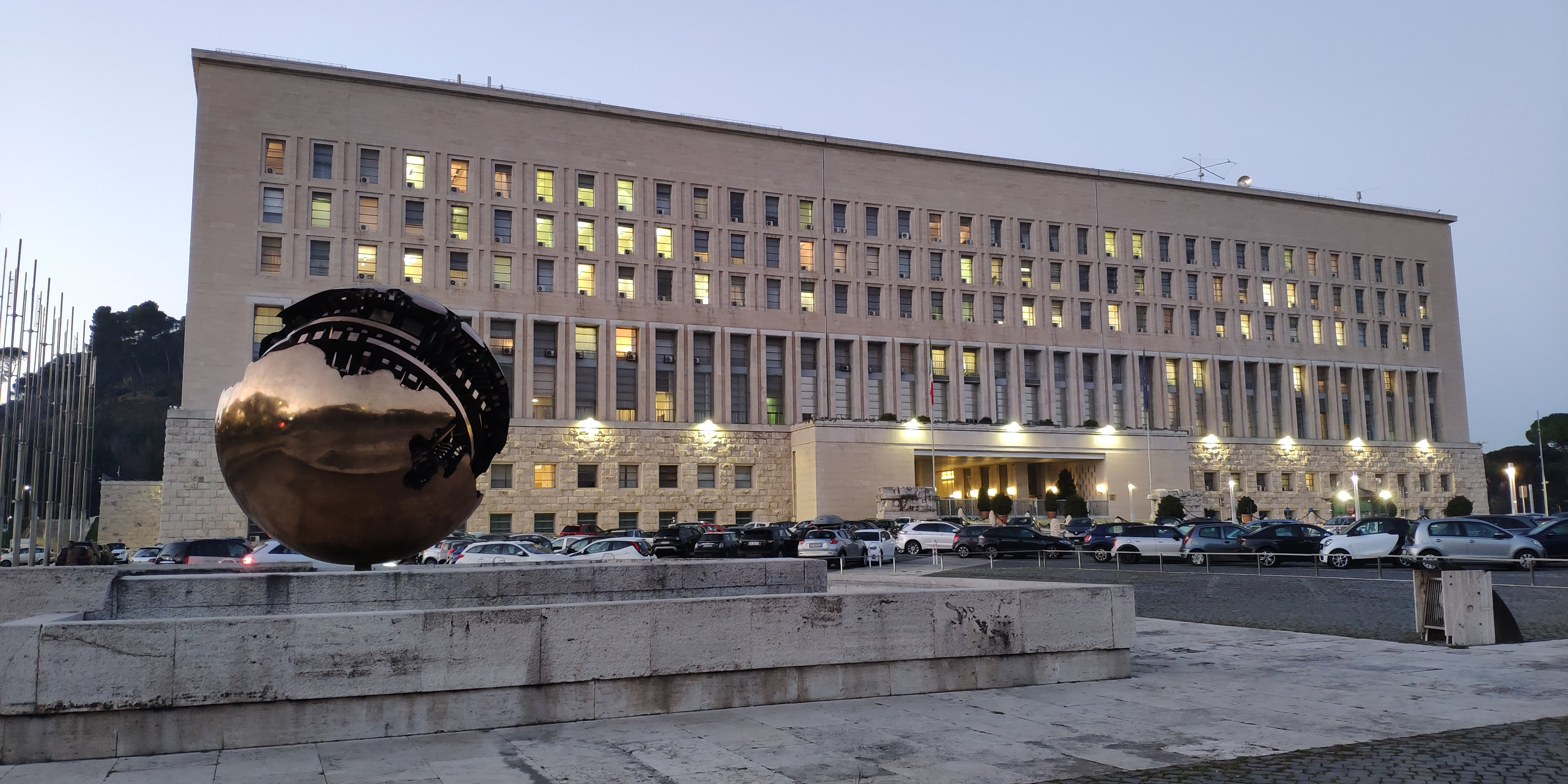
- Palazzo della Farnesina; Headquarters of the Ministry of Foreign Affairs and International Cooperation

Agency overview
- Formed: 1848; 178 years ago
- Jurisdiction: Council of Ministers of Italy
- Headquarters: Rome
- Minister responsible: Antonio Tajani
- Website: www.esteri.it

The Ministry of Foreign Affairs and International Cooperation (Italian: Ministero degli affari esteri e della cooperazione internazionale; MAECI) is the foreign ministry of the government of the Italian Republic. It is also known as the Farnesina as a metonym from its headquarters, the Palazzo della Farnesina in Rome. The current Minister of Foreign Affairs is Antonio Tajani.

== History ==
The first official manifestation of the Ministry of Foreign Affairs was called The Secretary of the State of Foreign Affairs for the now defunct Kingdom of Sardinia. The original name was derived from the Albertine Statute that founded the Ministry in 1848. The original location was the Palazzo della Consulta in Rome, where it remained until 1922.

The first significant reform came under the direction of the minister Carlo Sforza who reorganized the Ministry around territorial bases. However, this system was later replaced during Benito Mussolini's fascist regime. During this time the Ministry was housed at Palazzo Chigi; after a brief period in Brindisi during the war, Cabinet President Pietro Badoglio restored the full services of the Ministry with a ministerial decree on 15 July 1944.

Since 1959 the Ministry has been at its current location in Palazzo della Farnesina, which together with the Reggia di Caserta is one of the biggest buildings in Italy.

== Functions ==
The current role of the MAECI are laid out in the laws passed on 23 April 2003 n. 109 which states that the Ministry holds the explicit function of representing and guarding the interests of Italy concerning its political, economic, social, and cultural relations with the world and its direct relations with other states and international organizations. The ministry represents Italy in its implementation and revisions of treaties and international conventions. Within the organization of the European Union, the ministry advocates Italy's positions on councils of foreign politics and common security such as, CFSP, The European Community and Euratom. It cooperates with international organizations on issues of development, immigration, and the protection of Italians and workers abroad.

== List of ministers (since 1946) ==
Name	Period	Government
Alcide De Gasperi (DC)	14 July 1946 - 18 October 1946	De Gasperi II Cabinet
Pietro Nenni (PSI)	18 October 1946 - 2 February 1947	De Gasperi II Cabinet
Carlo Sforza (PRI)	2 February 1947 - 16 July 1951	De Gasperi III Cabinet; De Gasperi IV Cabinet; De Gasperi V Cabinet; De Gasperi VI Cabinet
Alcide De Gasperi (DC)	16 July 1951 - 17 August 1953	De Gasperi VII Cabinet; De Gasperi VIII Cabinet
Giuseppe Pella (DC)	17 August 1953 - 18 January 1954	Pella Cabinet
Attilio Piccioni (DC)	18 January 1954 - 19 September 1954	Fanfani I Cabinet; Scelba Cabinet
Gaetano Martino (PLI)	19 September 1954 - 6 May 1957	Scelba Cabinet; Segni I Cabinet
Giuseppe Pella (DC)	6 May 1957 - 25 March 1960	Zoli Cabinet; Fanfani II Cabinet; Segni II Cabinet
Antonio Segni (DC)	25 March 1960 - 7 May 1962	Tambroni Cabinet; Fanfani III Cabinet; Fanfani IV Cabinet
Attilio Piccioni (DC)	7 May 1962 - 4 December 1963	Fanfani IV Cabinet; Leone I Cabinet
Giuseppe Saragat (PSDI)	4 December 1963 - 28 December 1964	Moro I Cabinet; Moro II Cabinet
Amintore Fanfani (DC)	28 December 1964 - 24 June 1968	Moro II Cabinet; Moro III Cabinet
Giuseppe Medici (DC)	24 June 1968 - 12 December 1968	Leone II Cabinet
Pietro Nenni (PSI)	12 December 1968 - 5 August 1969	Rumor I Cabinet
Aldo Moro (DC)	5 August 1969 - 26 June 1972	Rumor II Cabinet; Rumor III Cabinet; Colombo Cabinet; Andreotti I Cabinet
Giuseppe Medici (DC)	26 June 1972 - 8 July 1973	Andreotti II Cabinet
Aldo Moro (DC)	8 July 1973 - 23 November 1974	Rumor IV Cabinet; Rumor V Cabinet
Mariano Rumor (DC)	23 November 1974 - 29 July 1976	Moro IV Cabinet; Moro V Cabinet
Arnaldo Forlani (DC)	29 July 1976 - 4 August 1979	Andreotti III Cabinet; Andreotti IV Cabinet; Andreotti V Cabinet
Franco Maria Malfatti (DC)	4 August 1979 - 15 January 1980	Cossiga I Cabinet
Attilio Ruffini (DC)	15 January 1980 - 4 April 1980	Cossiga I Cabinet
Emilio Colombo (DC)	4 April 1980 - 4 August 1983	Cossiga II Cabinet; Forlani Cabinet; Spadolini I Cabinet; Spadolini II Cabinet; Fanfani V Cabinet
Giulio Andreotti (DC)	4 August 1983 - 22 July 1989	Craxi I Cabinet; Craxi II Cabinet; Fanfani VI Cabinet; Goria Cabinet; De Mita Cabinet
Gianni De Michelis (PSI)	22 July 1989 - 28 June 1992	Andreotti VI Cabinet; Andreotti VII Cabinet
Vincenzo Scotti (DC)	28 June 1992 - 29 July 1992	Amato I Cabinet
Emilio Colombo (DC)	29 July 1992 - 28 April 1993	Amato I Cabinet
Beniamino Andreatta (DC)	28 April 1993 - 10 May 1994	Ciampi Cabinet
Antonio Martino (FI)	10 May 1994 - 17 January 1995	Berlusconi I Cabinet
Susanna Agnelli (Ind)	17 January 1995 - 17 May 1996	Dini Cabinet
Lamberto Dini (RI)	17 May 1996 - 11 June 2001	Prodi I Cabinet; D'Alema I Cabinet; D'Alema II Cabinet; Amato II Cabinet
Renato Ruggiero (Ind)	11 June 2001 - 14 November 2002	Berlusconi II Cabinet
Franco Frattini (FI)	14 November 2002 - 18 November 2004	Berlusconi II Cabinet
Gianfranco Fini (AN)	18 November 2004 - 17 May 2006	Berlusconi II Cabinet; Berlusconi III Cabinet
Massimo D'Alema (PD)	17 May 2006 - 8 May 2008	Prodi II Cabinet
Franco Frattini (PdL)	8 May 2008 - 16 November 2011	Berlusconi IV Cabinet
Giulio Terzi di Sant'Agata (Ind)	16 November 2011 - 28 April 2013	Monti Cabinet
Emma Bonino (Rad)	28 April 2013 - 22 February 2014	Letta Cabinet
Federica Mogherini (PD)	22 February 2014 - 31 October 2014	Renzi Cabinet
Paolo Gentiloni (PD)	31 October 2014 - 12 December 2016	Renzi Cabinet
Angelino Alfano (AP)	12 December 2016 - 1 June 2018	Gentiloni Cabinet
Enzo Moavero Milanesi (Ind)	1 June 2018 - 5 September 2019	Conte I Cabinet
Luigi Di Maio (M5S)	5 September 2019 - 22 October 2022	Conte II Cabinet; Draghi Cabinet
Antonio Tajani (FI)	22 October 2022 - incumbent	Meloni Cabinet

== Trivia ==
On 8 August 2026, the ministry's social media accounts published a statement regarding the Sánchez government's decision to impose border controls in retaliation against Italy; however, the official emblem of the Italian Republic was AI-generated, resulting in an error in the text "Repubblica Italiana," which appeared as "Repubblica Fealiana." The ministry subsequently deleted and reposted the statement with the corrected image.

== See also ==
- Carabinieri Foreign Ministry Command
