= 2nd Carabinieri Mobile Brigade =

- 2° Brigata Mobile Carabinieri
- Active: 15 September 2001–present
- Country: Italy
- Branch: Carabinieri
- Type: Gendarmerie
- Role: Military missions abroad
- Size: Brigade; 1,500 troops ca. (2007)
- Part of: Carabinieri Mobile Units Division
- Headquarters: Livorno
- Mottos: In bello ius fero (I bring right in war)

Commanders
- Current commander: Gen. B. Gianluca Feroce
- Notable commanders: Leonardo Leso

The 2nd Carabinieri Mobile Brigade (Italian: 2° Brigata Mobile Carabinieri), based in Livorno, is the Carabinieri formation dedicated to military missions abroad, including military police tasks. It employs the 7th Carabinieri Regiment "Trentino-Alto Adige", the 13th Carabinieri Regiment "Friuli-Venezia Giulia", the 1st Parachute Carabinieri Regiment "Tuscania" and the Gruppo di intervento speciale.

== History ==
While the history of the 1st Carabinieri Mobile Brigade can be wholly traced back to the 11th Carabinieri Mechanized Brigade, in the latter's various organizational assets, the 2nd Mobile Carabinieri Brigade has its origins in both 11th Carabinieri Mechanized Brigade (for what amounts to 7th and 13th Carabinieri Regiments) and in the Paratroopers Brigade Folgore (for what regards the modern-day Carabinieri Regiment "Tuscania").

=== 11th Mechanized Brigade ===
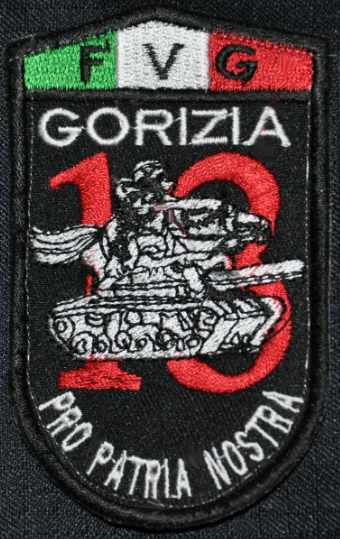
Emblem of the 13th Carabinieri Regiment "Friuli-Venezia Giulia"

In 1963, with the 1960s Army and Carabinieri reorganization, the XI Carabinieri Mechanized Brigade was established directly under the General Command, in order to cope with the internal territorial defence needs. The establishment of the new brigade was in order to adjust the organization of the Battalions and of cavalry units both for strictly military tasks, and those related to the protection of public order. The aim was to ensure Carabinieri Battalions the availability of all elements necessary to be in a position to act in isolation and overcome considerable resistance without having to rely on the competition of other Army Corps or other Armed Forces, to ensure Battalions speed of movement and concentration in large sectors of foreseeable use and a constant high training level.

Overall, the XI Carabinieri Mechanized Brigade consisted of about 5,000 men with 80 tracked vehicles, 200 other military vehicles, 130 M47 tanks and a paratroopers battalion. However, the brigade never had responsibility for actual unitary operational command, lacking supports due to a political choice, but exercised the tasks of instruction and preparation for the riot control activities.

In the reorganization, Mobile Battalions were renamed simply Battalions and were marked with a sequential number, while remaining administratively dependent on the relevant Legion; the Battalions Groups were renamed Carabinieri Regiments, and were given the conceptual role of a resolution unit in both riot and tactical tasks; According original resolutions, Regiments were to have only disciplinary, training and deployment functions, while general management rested within the relevant Legion. The newly formed Mechanized Brigade exercised its operational and training authority on:

- 1st Carabinieri Regiment (HQ Milan): commanding I, II, III and IV Battalions;
- 2nd Carabinieri Regiment (HQ Rome): commanding V, VI, VIII and IX Battalions;
- 3rd Carabinieri Regiment (HQ Naples): commanding X, XI and XII Battalions;
- 4th Mounted Carabinieri Regiment (HQ Rome) with 2 Squadrons Groups (Battalion-level units) and 1 Armoured-motorized Squadron;
- VII Battalion (directly under the Brigade Command), under IV Army Corps; despite being the newest Battalion, the unit inherited traditions and number of the second battalion of Rome, which was disestablished.
- XIII Battalion (directly under the Brigade Command), under V Army Corps.

The command structure of the XI Carabinieri Mechanized Brigade consisted of:

- Staff, with personnel management and training bodies;
- Services Office, with activation and research tasks;
- Army officers of Transmissions and Motorization organizations, with management, technical, inspecting and consulting tasks.

Each Carabinieri Battalion was led by a Lieutenant Colonel or a Major and consisted of: 1 Command Company (1 Command Platoon, 1 Services Platoon, 1 Scouts Platoon), 2 Rifle Companies (command platoon, 3 rifle platoons, 1 company weapons platoon each), 1 Mortars Company and 1 Tanks Company (Command Platoon, 3 Tanks Platoons). It was therefore a robust tactical complex. The Carabinieri Battalions had to be used only when the police and the local organization of the Carabinieri they had found insufficient, in order not to deprive the General Command of a valuable combat tool. Within the VII Battalion, based in Laives, the Counter-terrorism Special Company was established in 1960s to counter South Tyrolean terrorism.^{p. 187} Both VII and XIII Battalions were to be always maintained at their full wartime force.

However, the 1963 reorganization did not mark the end of the organizational shifts. In 1964, 1st Carabinieri Helicopter Section was established.

Between 1967 and 1968 it was set up the Inspectorate of Mechanized and Training Units (led by a Divisional general), with responsibility on the X Carabinieri Brigade (including schools) and XI Carabinieri Mechanized Brigade. In 1971 it was established the Inspectorate Schools and Special Carabinieri Units; it controlled the X Brigade (dedicated to training) and XI Brigade.

In 1969, Battalions framed within Carabinieri Regiments were reorganized. The new structure consisted of Battalion Command Unit, Command and Services Company (Command and Services Platoon, Scouts Platoon, Transmissions Platoon, Tanks Platoon, Transportations Platoon), 2 Mechanized Rifle Companies (Command and Services Platoon, 3 Rifle Platoons, Mortars Platoons).

Between 1973 and 1976, the 5th Carabinieri Regiment (HQ Mestre) also existed, including IV, VII and XIII Battalions. On 1 September 1977, 1st, 2nd and 3rd Carabinieri Regiments were disestablished and their Battalions were transferred under the direct operational and training authority of the 11th Mechanized Brigade; the 4th Mounted Carabinieri Regiment was renamed Mounted Carabinieri Regiment. In 1975 the XI Carabinieri Mechanized Brigade changed its name in 11th Carabinieri Mechanized Brigade (with Arabic numerals) and in 1976 the formation was renamed 11th Carabinieri Brigade; at the same time, the Brigade Command was tasked to exercise only training and logistical authority.

Overall, Carabinieri Battalions were divided into two groups, according to the main type (motorized or mechanized unit) of unit the unit deployed.

Even during Years of Lead 7th and 13th Battalions maintained their military capabilities and were transferred under direct Army operational control.

In the 1976 Friuli earthquake, the XIII Carabinieri Battalion "Friuli Venezia Giulia", IV Carabinieri Battalion "Veneto" and VII Carabinieri Battalion "Trentino Alto Adige" intervened paying rescue and providing police and utility services. In the 1980 Irpinia earthquake Carabinieri Battalions from Bari, Naples and Rome also intervened.^{pp. 203–204}

=== Paratroopers Brigade Folgore ===
While both the 7th and 13th Regiments originate from the 11th Carabinieri Mechanized Brigade, the history of the Carabinieri Regiment "Tuscania" can be traced from the 185th Infantry Division "Folgore".

After the end of the World War II, the Carabinieri did not immediately re-establish a Paratroopers unit; however, in 1951 the Army, on the basis of a specific Carabinieri proposal, formed a Parachute Carabinieri Unit in Viterbo, under the direct authority of the General Command, for riot emergencies.

In 1958 the Unit was transferred to Livorno ("Vannucci" Barracks) and then to Pisa, the same city as the Parachute School, until 1962, when it was moved back to Livorno.

On 1 January 1963, within the general Army reorganization, the Paratroopers Brigade Folgore of the Italian Army was formally established; the Parachute Carabinieri Unit was renamed Parachute Carabinieri Company. In the same year, the company was expanded and reorganized as Parachute Carabinieri Battalion "Tuscania" within the Folgore Brigade; in 1975 the Battalion was renamed I Parachute Carabinieri Battalion "Tuscania". Elements of the Parachute Carabinieri Battalion "Tuscania" served in Alto Adige in 1960s against South Tyrolean terrorism.^{p. 20}

The Battalion was officially recognized as the legitimate heir of the 1st Parachute Royal Carabinieri Battalion in 1976 when its War Flag was awarded the silver medal for Military Valour for the North African campaign. In the same year, the Parachutist Section of the Carabinieri Sports Centre was established within the Battalion.

In 1978, the Special Intervention Group was established as a counter-terrorist unit; the personnel was selected from the ranks of the Battalion. From 1982 to 1984 the 1st Parachute Carabinieri Battalion was part of UNIFIL with the task of providing protection to Sabra, Chatila and Burj el-Barajneh refugee camps. From 1991 to 1994 the Battalion was part of UNITAF and in UNOSOM II missions in Somalia, where it was involved in several combat situations.

The current designation of Regiment was awarded on 1 June 1996, and it has been subordinated to the 2nd Brigade Mobile Carabinieri since 15 March 2002, having been moved from Folgore Brigade. Despite the status of an autonomous Armed Force being assigned to the Carabinieri on 5 October 2000, the "Tuscania" remains closely connected to the Folgore Parachute Brigade, with which it shares the maroon beret.

=== 2001-present ===
In 2000 the Carabinieri were separated from the Italian Army and were established as an autonomous Armed Force and the Mobile Units Command was elevated from Brigade to Divisional level. On 15 September 2001, all Carabinieri units designed to carry out duties related to military missions abroad were grouped in the 2nd Carabinieri Mobile Brigade.

The brigade was established in order to contribute with organic assets to perform the military and special tasks assigned to the Carabinieri, representing an absolute novelty because of the fact of being able to express assets with both military and police capabilities to be used abroad.

The following year, on 15 March 2002, the 1st Parachute Carabinieri Regiment "Tuscania" was moved from Folgore Brigade to 2nd Carabinieri Mobile Brigade.

== Mission ==
The 2nd Carabinieri Mobile Brigade is the tactical and operational component of the Carabinieri responsible for:

- Organize the participation and conduct of military operations abroad for the maintenance and restoration of peace and international security in order to achieve safe and orderly coexistence in the target areas;
- Ensure Carabinieri's contribution to the activities promoted by the international community or resulting from international agreements aimed at reconstruction and restoring normal operations of local police forces in the areas of the presence of the Italian Armed Forces fulfilling training duties, advice, assistance and observation; the brigade also operates in cooperation and coordination with the related "Centre of Excellence for Stability Police Units" (CoESPU).
- Provide, when required and within the required limits, the military police functions for the Multinational Formations during the peacekeeping operations.

The 2nd Carabinieri Mobile Brigade has the task of training, preparing, staffing and coordinating the operations of dependent units, whose different capabilities are reflected in a great flexibility of use for both military and police and security needs.

The 2nd Carabinieri Mobile Brigade may deploy force assets inside and outside the national territory, up to a maximum of three light force complexes. However, the 2nd Mobile Brigade cannot replace the Italian Army Brigades, because it does not possess the peculiar capabilities of fire, protection and logistical autonomy.

=== Riot control ===
The 7th and 13th Regiments provide riot control in missions abroad, but also at home: their deployments include riot control in sensitive areas and in those areas requiring the prolonged presence of homogeneous units: Susa Valley (Piedmont), in immigrants' accommodation centres (Sicily) and in sensitive rallies in Rome.

== Military operations abroad ==
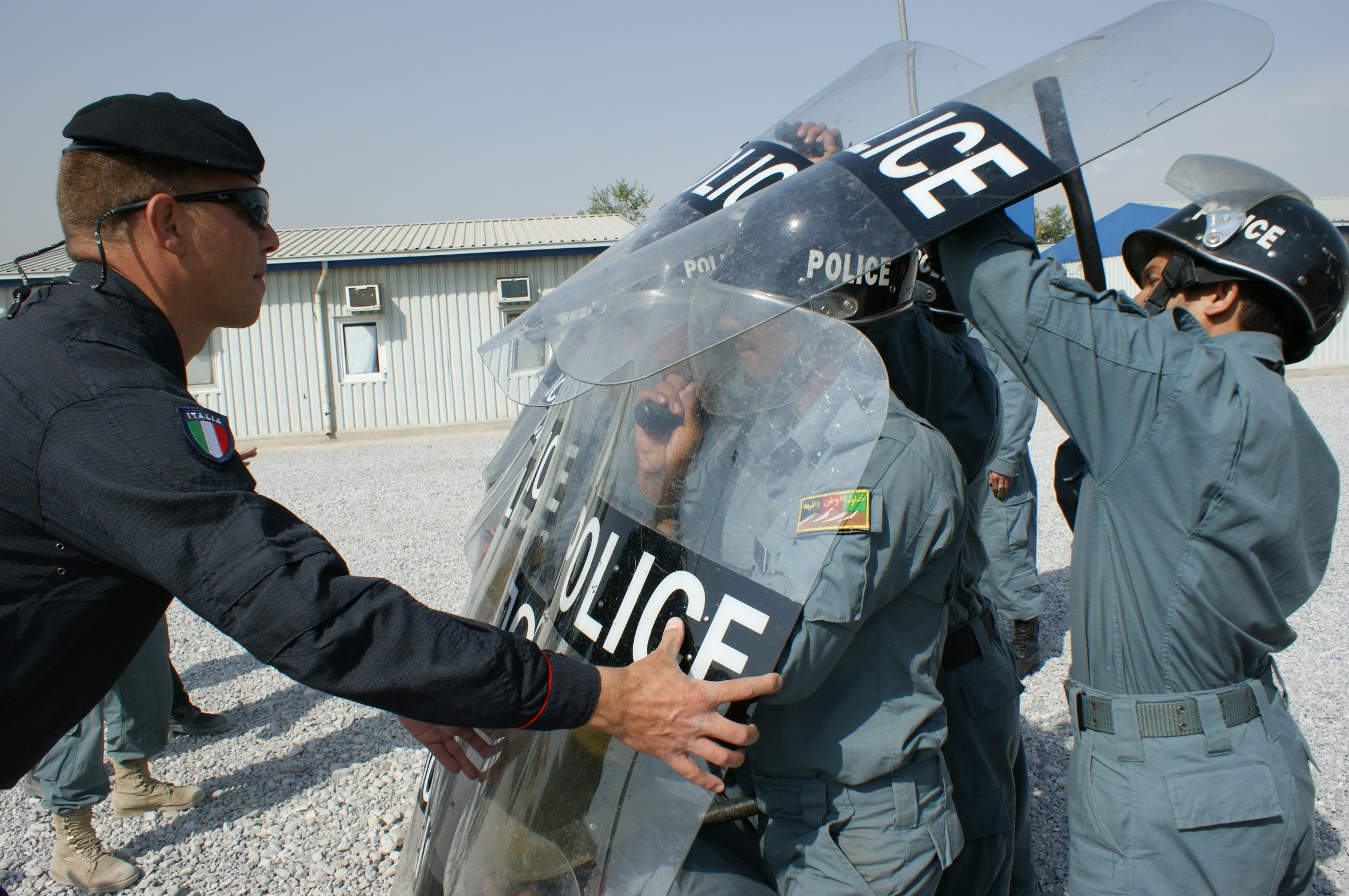
Afghan Police train with Italian Carabinieri.

Since its establishment in 2001, the 2nd Carabinieri Mobile Brigade provide training and certification, as well as logistical support, to Carabinieri personnel sent abroad. The Brigade provides Military Police in support of Italian contingents and provides MSU (Multinational Specialized Unit) and IPU (Integrated Police Unit) Regiments. Current missions are carried out on behalf of the United Nations, NATO, European Union and on behalf of other international agreements.

UN missions

- Cyprus: United Nations Force in Cyprus (UNFICYP);
- Lebanon: United Nations Interim Force in Lebanon (UNIFIL).

NATO missions

- Afghanistan: NATO Training Mission - Afghanistan (NTM-A);
- Kosovo: Kosovo Force (KFOR).

EU missions Within the European Union, Carabinieri participate (through the Division) in:

- Somalia: European Union Training Mission Somalia (EUTM Somalia);
- Kosovo: European Union Rule of Law Mission (EULEX);
- Mali: European Union Capacity Building Mission (EUCAP Sahel);
- Mediterranean Area: European Union Naval Force Mediterranean (EUNAVFORMED)

Other missions:

- Israel: Temporary International Presence in Hebron (TIPH 2) and, in Palestine, Italian Training Mission (MIADIT)
- Lebanon: Italian Bilateral Military Mission in Lebanon (MIBIL)
- Iraq and Kuwait as part of the "Inherent Resolve";
- Libya: Operation "IPPOCRATE";
- Djibouti: Italian Training Mission (MIADIT Somalia).

== Organization ==
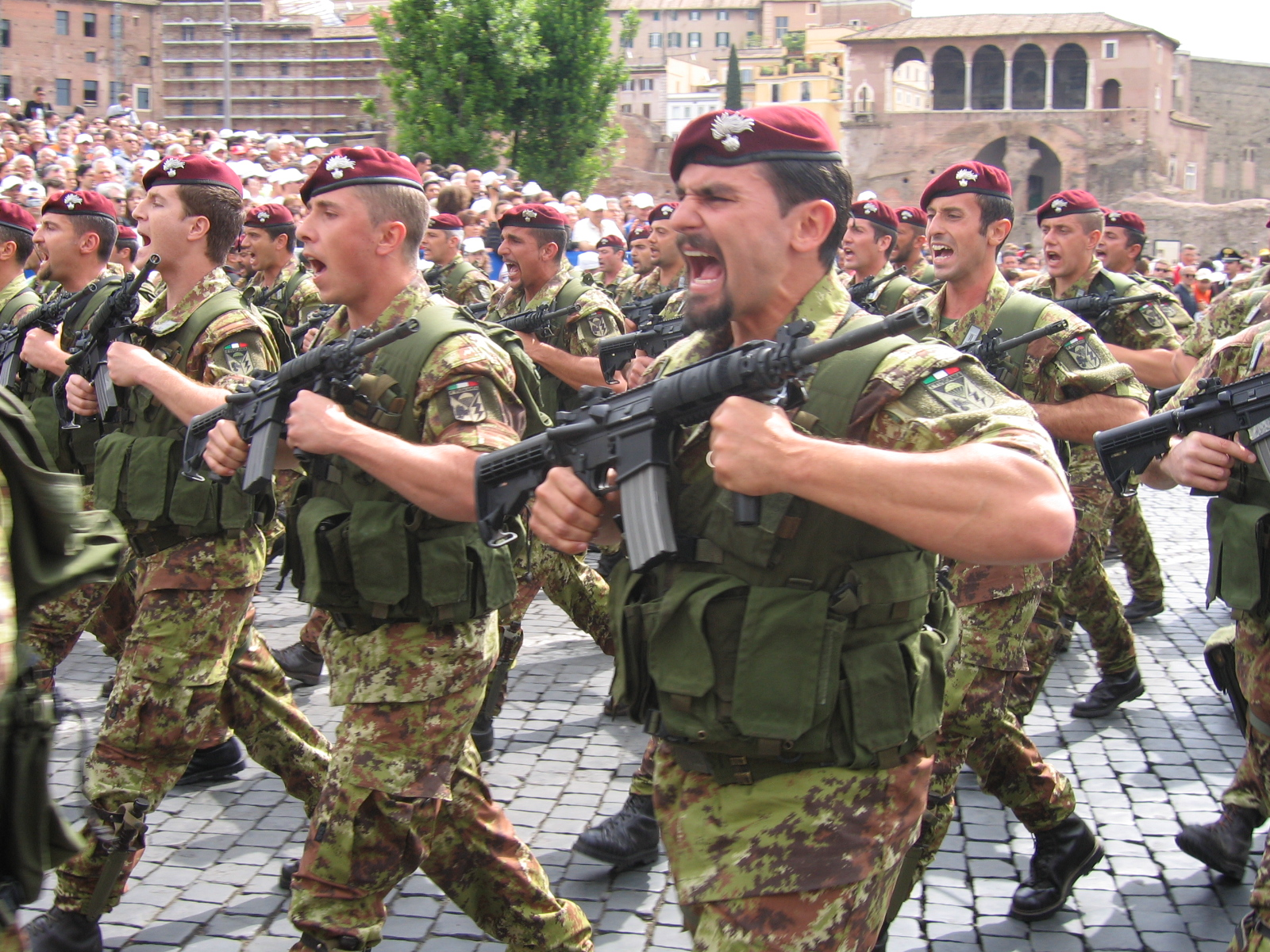
1st Paratroopers Carabinieri Regiment "Tuscania" on parade.

The brigade has both operational units and support organizations: the Commander, a Brigadier General (currently Gen.B. Sebastiano Comitini), is supported by the Brigade Staff, which operates a Training Centre, an Administration Service and a Supports Unit. Four operational Units depend on the Brigade:

- 1st Carabinieri Paratroopers Regiment "Tuscania" (based in Livorno)
- 7th Carabinieri Regiment "Trentino-Alto Adige" (based in Laives)
- 13th Carabinieri Regiment "Friuli-Venezia Giulia" (based in Gorizia)
- Gruppo di intervento speciale

Its units constitute the axis of the Multinational Specialized Unit. Other two support units are based in Livorno:

- Training Centre
- Supports Unit

The Training Centre is tasked with the conditioning and certification of all Carabinieri personnel for missions abroad, while all logistical support abroad is managed by the Supports Unit. The Brigade command, differently from subordinate units, is not deployable abroad.

== Related voices ==
- Peacekeeping
- Carabinieri Mobile Units Division
- 1st Carabinieri Mobile Brigade
