= Combat Dress =

Combat Dress was the name of the uniform worn by members of the Land Force Command of the Canadian Forces from 1968 to 2002.

The Olive Green Combat Dress replaced the 1949 Pattern Battle Dress. Olive green uniforms were adopted by NATO members in the 1960s, but abandoned for camouflage and disruptive patterns by all but Canada. Development of CADPAT started in the 1990s, but it was not until the turn of the 21st century that widespread adoption began. The Royal Canadian Army Cadets and the Royal Canadian Air Cadets issue parts of the Combat Dress uniform in limited numbers alongside the Field Training Uniform for training in the field.

For more on combat dress, see CF Operational Dress.

== Components ==
- Olive Green t-shirt
- Combat Shirt Coat
- Combat Trousers
- Combat Cap
- General Service Combat Coat (A jacket with a detachable liner)
- Extreme Cold Weather Parka (with a detachable liner)
- Combat Boots

The basic combat clothing was a flocked cotton over nylon. There are many different variations of the Canadian Combat Shirt Coat. The GS Combat Shirt was made of heavy cotton while the ECW Parka had a nylon shell. Both the Combat Shirt and the Parka had two lower cargo pockets with inserts that could hold three C1 20 round magazines each. The upper two pockets were angled inward and could hold one C1 magazine each. The combat shirts also have one inner pocket that was held closed by velcro and was clearly visible by an outline of thread on the outer right side of the shirt. Both the jackets and combat shirts have drawstrings on the bottom and in the middle of the shirt; these were there to prevent debris and winds from entering the shirt as well as to prevent billowing during parajumping. Combat Trousers also had "blousers" which were tucked into the boots and the drawstring on the bottom of the pant leg would be tightened around the top of the boot to keep out foreign objects and pests.

== See also ==
- CADPAT
