= 13th Carabinieri Regiment =

13th Carabinieri Regiment "Friuli Venezia Giulia"
- 13° Reggimento Carabinieri "Friuli Venezia Giulia"
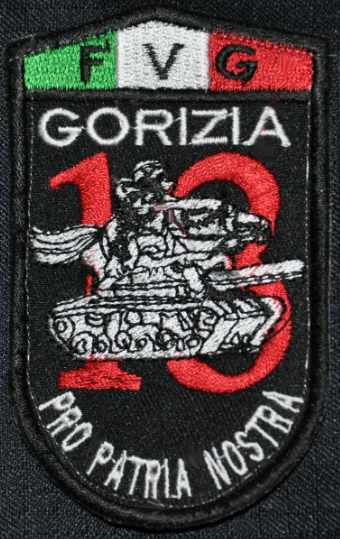
- Coat of Arms of the 13th Carabinieri Regiment "Friuli Venezia Giulia"
- Active: 1940 - 1943; 1947 - present
- Country: Italy
- Branch: Carabinieri
- Type: Gendarmerie
- Role: Military police, Stability police, Riot control
- Size: Regiment
- Part of: 2nd Carabinieri Mobile Brigade
- Garrison/HQ: Gorizia
- Motto: Pro Patria Nostra

Commanders
- Current commander: Col. Nicola Pio Michele Ferrucci

The 13th Carabinieri Regiment "Friuli Venezia Giulia" (Italian: 13° Reggimento Carabinieri "Friuli Venezia Giulia") is a unit of the Carabinieri of Italy. It is based in Gorizia and subordinated to the 2nd Carabinieri Mobile Brigade.

== History ==
=== Second World War ===
On 21 December 1940, the "XIII Mobilized Royal Carabinieri Battalion" was established with personnel drawn from the Carabinieri Territorial Legion of Bologna. The battalion was deployed to the Albanian front. On 8 September 1943, the battalion was disbanded after the armistice of Cassibile.

=== Cold War ===
On 5 November 1947, the Mobile Carabinieri Battalion "Gorizia" was established in Padua under the local Carabinieri Legion. It was tasked with border and domestic security.

On 31 January 1948, the battalion moved to Gorizia. It was renamed to "XIII Carabinieri Mobile Battalion" in 1 March 1950 and was subordinated to the Carabinieri Territorial Legion of Udine on 1 November 1950.

On 15 October 1964 the battalion was assigned military duties under the Italian Army's V Army Corps. The corps provided training during peacetime and assumed operational control during wartime.

On 13 February 1976, the battalion changed from a mechanized to an armoured unit and was renamed as the 13th Carabinieri Battalion "M.O. Gallo". It received its war flag on 12 November 1976.

On 1 September 1977, the battalion became a Corps Command and, on the following 1 December 1977, it came under the control of the 11th Carabinieri Brigade. The shift from to meant that The transition from Unit Command (Italian: Comando di reparto) to Corps Command (Italian: Comando di Corpo) meant that the Commander of the 13th Battalion assumed command of the organically constituted Unit and, above all, granted autonomy in its operations and in logistics, technical, and administrative matters. As the head of a "Corps Command," the commander of the 13th Battalion thus became directly responsible for discipline, organization, deployment, and personnel training.

However, the Battalion still remained under the V Army Corps for duties related to wartime use. On 1 February 1978, the battalion was renamed as the 13th Carabinieri Battalion "Friuli Venezia Giulia".

On 7 January 1988, the battalion was subordinated to the Northeast Military Region Command as part of changes to the army's General Plan concerning the use of forces in an emergency.

=== After the Cold War ===
In the 1990s, following the end of the Cold War, the battalion was reorganized for the domestic security role.

The 7th and 13th Carabinieri Battalions served as expeditionary element for international peacekeeping and stability operations. Battalion units began participating in foreign military missions in 1991.

The battalion was elevated to the regimental level on 15 September 2001 and was subordinated to the new 2nd Carabinieri Mobile Brigade, like all Carabinieri units designed primarily for foreign deployment.

In 2003, the 13th Carabinieri Regiment was part of the initial Carabinieri's Multinational Specialized Unit (MSU) deployment for Operation Ancient Babylon, the Italian military mission for the Iraq War based in Nasiriyah. The regiment suffered three killed by suicide attack in the 2003 Nasiriyah bombing.

On 25 May 2012, the regiment suffered one killed in Adraskan during the war in Afghanistan from a 107mm rocket attack.

On 22 February 2021, the Italian ambassador to the Democratic Republic of the Congo Luca Attanasio was murdered in North Kivu by gunmen. Attanasio's bodyguard, a member of the regiment, was also killed.

=== List of commanders ===
- Col. Luciano Zubani (2003 - 2006)
- Col. Claudio D’Angelo (September 2010 - 23 September 2015)
- Col. Patrizio La Spada (23 September 2015 - 21 September 2019)
- Col. Saverio Ceglie (21 September 2019 - 19 September 2022)
- Col. Nicola Pio Michele Ferrucci (since 20 September 2022)

== Mission ==
The regiment participates in international missions, including through the MSU. It provides security and surveillance services to Italian embassies in high-risk locations.

The regiment is mainly used in missions abroad, contributing to forming a large part of the contingents for the IPU (Integrated Police Unit) Regiments in Bosnia and Herzegovina, employing military police units for the UNIFIL mission in Lebanon, also operating in Albania, North Macedonia, Haiti, Georgia, Eritrea, Palestine, Chad, Somalia, Libya, Djibouti.

The regiment has also been employed in public order tasks, providing riot control service in the event of events of national importance such as street demonstrations or football matches, as well as in civil defence operations during natural disasters and other critical issues.

== Organisation ==
The 13th Carabinieri Regiment "Friuli Venezia Giulia" includes three Operational Companies and a Command and Services Company.

== Honours and decorations ==
The 13th Carabinieri Regiment "Friuli Venezia Giulia" has been awarded with the following honours and decorations:

- Knight of the Military Order of Italy (2019)
- Knight of the Military Order of Italy (2021)
