= 1st Carabinieri Paratroopers Regiment "Tuscania" =

- 1° Reggimento Carabinieri Paracadutisti "Tuscania"
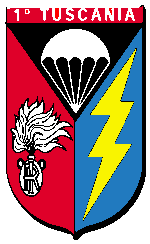
- Active: 1940–1942; 1963–present
- Country: Kingdom of Italy; Italy
- Branch: Carabinieri
- Type: Special operations forces
- Size: Regiment
- Part of: 2nd Carabinieri Mobile Brigade
- Garrison/HQ: "Vannucci" Barracks, Livorno, Italy
- Nickname: "I Leoni del Deserto" (Desert Lions)
- Mottos: "Se il destino è contro di noi, peggio per lui." (If Destiny is against us, too bad for him.)
- Engagements: Lebanon, Namibia, Somalia, West Bank, Bosnia, Kosovo, Afghanistan, Iraq
- Decorations

Commanders
- Commander: Col. Antonio Bruno
- Notable commanders: Leonardo Leso

The 1st Carabinieri Paratroopers Regiment "Tuscania" (Italian: 1° Reggimento Carabinieri Paracadutisti "Tuscania") is a special operations unit of the Italian Carabinieri. Together with the 7th Carabinieri Regiment in Laives, the 13th Carabinieri Regiment in Gorizia, and the Special Intervention Group it forms the 2nd Carabinieri Mobile Brigade. The regiment is based in Livorno, and has approximately 550 personnel.

The regimental emblem includes elements from its speciality (paratroopers), its Armed Force (Carabinieri) and its longtime association (Folgore Brigade).

== History ==
The history of Carabinieri Paratroopers dates back to World War II. On 5 June 1940, the Chief of Staff of the Italian Royal Army, then Army General Mario Roatta, requested the Commandant General of the Royal Carabinieri, at the time Lieutenant General Riccardo Moizo, to establish a Royal Carabinieri Paratroopers Battalion, approving an earlier request of General Moizo.^{p. 24}

=== World War II ===
On 1 July 1940 the 1st Royal Carabinieri Paratroopers Battalion (1° Battaglione Reali Carabinieri Paracadutisti) was established with three companies in Tarquinia. On 9 July, Undersecretary Army General Ubaldo Soddu objected to the establishment of a Carabinieri battalion, arguing that a single-arm of single-speciality battalion could not be established (also in order to avoid rivalries); under the terms of Soddu's report, the Royal Carabinieri could establish only platoon-level units. The Higher Air Force Command, nonetheless, kept the Carabinieri Battalion in force.^{p. 27} The following year the unit was framed within the 1st Paratroopers Regiment.

The first commander was Major Bruto Bixio Bersanetti; on 28 August 1940 he was replaced by Major Edoardo Alessi.^{pp. 95–96}

When deployed in Libya, the battalion consisted of:^{p. 99}

- Command unit: led by Lieutenant Max Ambrosi;
- 1st Company: led by Lieutenant Gennaro Piccinini Leopardi;
- 2nd Company: led by Lieutenant Giuseppe Casini;
- 3rd Company: led by Lieutenant Osmano Bonapace;
- Engineers-Saboteurs Platoon: led by Lieutenant Renato Mattei.

For a total of 26 officers, 51 non-commissioned officers and 322 troops.

The battalion performed counter commando activity in Libya (a platoon) and fought in Eluet el Asel area in December 1941 and in Ajdabiya as a company (under Lieutenant Osmano Bonapace),^{pp. 128–129} being disbanded in 1942 in Castelvetrano.

With the surviving personnel, two Carabinieri Sections were formed: the 184th Carabinieri Section was assigned to the Folgore Division, while the 314th Carabinieri Section was assigned to the Nembo Division and fought in the Italian Civil War on the loyalist side.

=== Carabinieri Paratroopers Unit ===
After the end of the war, the Carabinieri did not immediately re-establish a paratroopers unit. However, on 15 May 1951 the Army, on the basis of a specific Carabinieri proposal, formed a Carabinieri Paratroopers Unit in Viterbo, under the immediate authority of the General Command, for riot emergencies. The Unit was devoted to the fulfilment of the Carabinieri gendarmerie tasks and was 140 troops-strong.

On 10 January 1956, the Carabinieri Paratroopers Unit participated in the rescue operations for Viterbo and its surroundings, whose inhabitants had remained isolated, without food and without medical assistance, due to the violent blizzards that had paralyzed the road network and communications in that province.

In 1958 the unit was moved to Livorno ("Vannucci" Barracks) and then to Pisa, the same city as the Parachute School, until 1962, when it was moved back in Livorno.

=== Paratroopers Brigade Folgore ===
On 1 January 1963, within the general Army reorganization, the Paratroopers Brigade Folgore was formally established (although it received the name only in 1967); the Carabinieri Paratroopers Unit was renamed Carabinieri Paratroopers Company and was assigned to the Paratroopers Brigade. The Carabinieri Paratroopers Company depended for administrative purposes on Livorno Carabinieri Legion. On 15 July of the same year the company was expanded and reorganized as Carabinieri Paratroopers Battalion "Tuscania" within the Folgore Brigade.

On 14 June 1964, then-President Antonio Segni awarded the Silver Medal of Military Valor to the Carabinieri War Flag for the Battle of Elet el Ausel.

Carabinieri Paratroopers served in Alto Adige in the 1960s against South Tyrolean terrorism,^{p. 20} within the 150-troops strong Special Antiterrorism Company, along with Paratrooper Saboteurs (predecessors of present-day Italian special forces), Alpine, Guard of Finance and police troops. The Special Antiterrorism Company was led by Paratrooper Carabinieri Captain Francesco Gentile, dead in the 1967 Cima Vallona attack.

On 1 October 1975 the battalion was renamed 1st Carabinieri Paratroopers Battalion "Tuscania". On 8 April 1976 the battalion received the War Flag. The battalion was officially recognized as the legitimate heir of the 1st Royal Carabinieri Paratroopers Battalion in the same year, when its War Flag was awarded with the silver medal for Military Valour for the North African campaign. On 10 December 1976, the Parachutism Section of the Carabinieri Sports Centre was established within the battalion.

On 2 February 1978, the Special Intervention Group was established as a counter-terrorist unit; the personnel were selected from the ranks of the battalion. In the 1980s, the battalion was included into the Special Operations Group in order to support the Italian part of the stay-behind network Operation Gladio.

From 1982 to 1984 the 1st Carabinieri Paratroopers Battalion "Tuscania" was part of UNIFIL with the task of providing protection to Sabra, Chatila and Burj el-Barajneh refugee camps: the battalion, based in Beirut, was the only unit consisting of career personnel and fulfilled sensitive tasks. From 1983 to 1986 and from 1989 to 1993, the battalion was deployed in Calabria, Sardinia, and Sicilia, supporting the arrests of several mafia bosses.

In the late 1980s the battalion was deployed to protect the Italian Embassy in Mogadishu, Somalia. On 25 December 1989, a detachment of the battalion evacuated Italian diplomatic personnel from Bucharest.

The early 1990s saw the battalion deployed both at home and abroad. Until the establishment of the Carabinieri Heliborne Squadron "Cacciatori di Calabria" in 1991 and of the Sardinian counterpart in 1993, the "Tuscania" Battalion was deployed again against organized crime in Aspromonte and in Barbagia. Meanwhile, from 1991 to 1994 the battalion was part of UNITAF and in UNOSOM II missions in Somalia, where it was involved in several combat situations. Diplomatic security was also provided in Zaire (until 1994) and in Peru (1992).

On 5 November 1994, the War Flag was awarded a silver medal for Army Valor for the performance of the 1st Carabinieri Paratroopers Battalion "Tuscania" in Somalia.

In 1995, as part of IFOR, the battalion was deployed in Bosnia-Herzegovina as military police and commander's protection, with one Platoon in Sarajevo and one in Mostar. Then-Battalion Commander, Lieutenant Colonel Leonardo Leso, was also the command's legal advisor. In the same year, the battalion was deployed in Barbagia for anti-banditry duties.

As of 1995, only two operational Companies existed within the Battalion: the 1st Company, consisting of young Carabinieri and conscripted auxiliaries, and the 3rd Company, made up of veterans.

On 25 September 1995, the Organisation Office of the General Command of the Carabinieri officially requested to the Italian Army Staff the elevation of the Battalion to Regimental status.

The current designation of Regiment was awarded on 1 June 1996, when a third operational Company was added. In 1997 the regiment evacuated non-Albanian personnel from that country. In 1999, the regiment was deployed in Kosovo and in East Timor. In East Timor the regiment operated as a special operations force. In 2000, the regiment deployed fifty paratroopers in Naples in the Operation "Golfo". On occasion of the 2001 27th G8 summit held in Genoa, the regiment was deployed as part of the security apparatus with tactical reserve tasks.

=== 2nd Carabinieri Mobile Brigade ===
The regiment has been subordinated to the 2nd Carabinieri Mobile Brigade since 15 March 2002,^{p. 184} having been moved from Paratroopers Brigade "Folgore". Despite the status of an Armed Force being awarded to the Carabinieri on 5 October 2000, the "Tuscania" shares the maroon beret of the paracadutisti.

In 2003 the "Tuscania" Regiment was deployed in Iraq as part of Operation Ancient Babylon. The regiment provided security in Nasiriyah and trained the Iraqi Police.The regiment took also part to 2004 Nasiriyah battle.

According to Major General Nicola Zanelli, Commander of the CO.F.S. (the Italian joint Command of special forces), in 2017 a company of the 1st Paratroopers Carabinieri Regiment "Tuscania" is intended to be upgraded to the special forces (Tier 2) level. As of 2018, some military expert call for the establishment of an additional operational Company or even of an additional Battalion. In 2021, troops from the Regiment were deployed in Afghanistan to assist evacuation efforts during the fall of Kabul.

== List of Commanders ==
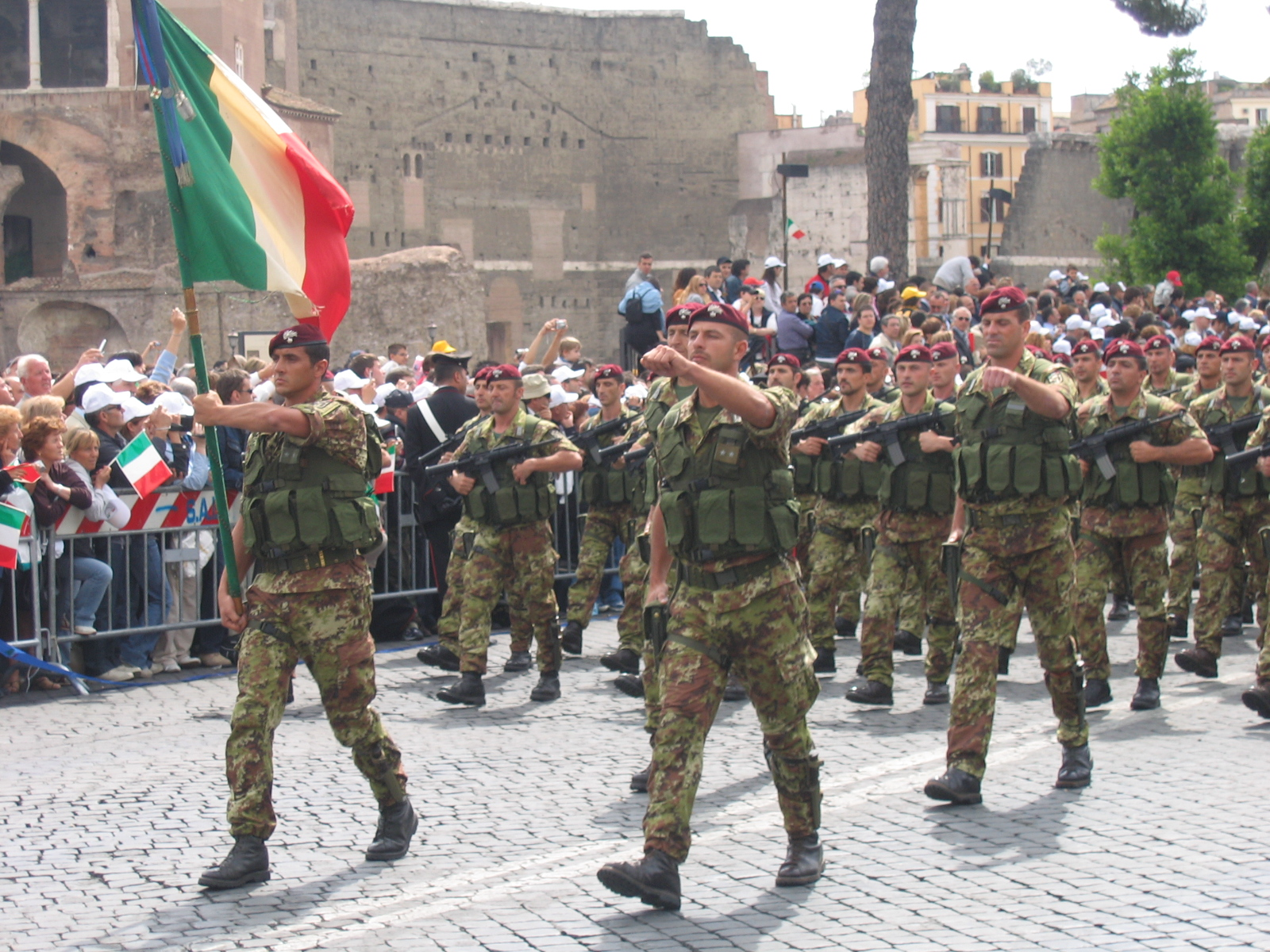
Paratroopers of the regiment parade in Rome in 2006.

=== 1st Royal Carabinieri Paratroopers Battalion ===
The 1st Royal Carabinieri Paratroopers Battalion had two Commanders from 1940 to 1942:

- Magg. Bruto Bixio Bersanetti: 1 July 1940 – 28 August 1940;
- Magg. Edoardo Alessi: 29 August 1940 – 6 March 1942.

=== Carabinieri Paratroopers Unit ===
The Carabinieri Paratroopers Unit had seven Commanders from 1951 to 1962:

- Ten. Leonardo Leonardi: 15 May 1951 – 20 October 1951;
- Cap. Manlio Iannaccone: 21 October 1951 – 10 April 1952;
- Cap. Osmano Bonapace: 11 April 1952 – 19 July 1953;
- Cap. Salvatore Troja: 20 July 1953 – 25 August 1957;
- Ten. Bruno Tibaldi: 26 August 1957 – 17 January 1958;
- Cap. Argeo Paolo D'Anchise: 18 January 1958 – 24 April 1961;
- Cap. Francesco Gentile: 25 April 1961 – 31 December 1962.

=== Carabinieri Paratroopers Company ===
The Carabinieri Paratroopers Company had two Commanders in 1963:

- Cap. Francesco Gentile: 1 January 1963 – 17 March 1963;
- Magg. Salvatore Troja: 18 March 1963 – 14 July 1963.

=== Carabinieri Paratroopers Battalion ===
The 1st Carabinieri Paratroopers Battalion "Tuscania", under the various designation changes, had ten Commanders from 1963 to 1996:

- Ten. Col. Salvatore Troja: 15 July 1963 – 30 November 1971;
- Ten. Col. Vincenzo Oresta: 1 December 1971 – 27 August 1974;
- Ten. Col. Romano Marchisio: 28 August 1974 – 10 January 1978;
- Ten. Col. Giuseppino Quartararo: 11 January 1978 – 14 June 1981;
- Ten. Col. Raffaele Petrarchi: 15 June 1981 – 10 September 1981;
- Ten. Col. Armando Talarico: 11 September 1981 – 4 September 1984;
- Ten. Col. Pietro Pistolese: 5 September 1984 – 8 September 1986;
- Ten. Col. Angelo Carano: 9 September 1986 – 13 September 1989;
- Ten. Col. Alberto Raucci: 14 September 1989 – 5 September 1991;
- Ten. Col. Angelo Carano: 6 September 1991 – 9 September 1993;
- Ten. Col. Leonardo Leso: 10 September 1993 – 31 May 1996.

=== 1st Carabinieri Paratroopers Regiment "Tuscania" ===
After being raised to Regiment, the 1st Carabinieri Paratroopers Regiment "Tuscania" remained within the Folgore Brigade until 2002 with four Commanders:

- Col. Leonardo Leso: 1 June 1996 – 6 September 1997;
- Col. Michele Franzè: 7 September 1997 – January 2000;
- Col. Alberto Raucci: January 2000 – 2001;
- Col. Carlo Chierego: 2001 – 14 March 2002.

On 15 March 2002, the 1st Carabinieri Paratroopers Regiment "Tuscania" has been moved to the 2nd Carabinieri Mobile Brigade.

- Col. Carlo Chierego: 15 March 2002 – 29 September 2002;
- Col. Carmelo Burgio: 30 September 2002 – 14 November 2003
- Col. Sebastiano Comitini; 15 November 2003 – 7 September 2006
- Col. Gino Micale: 8 September 2006 – 26 September 2008;
- Col. Paolo Nardone: assumed command on 27 September 2008
- Col. Antonio Frassinetto: assumed command on 11 May 2013 – 2017
- Col. Francesco Marra
- Col. Salvatore Demontis
- Col. Antonio Bruno

== Operations ==
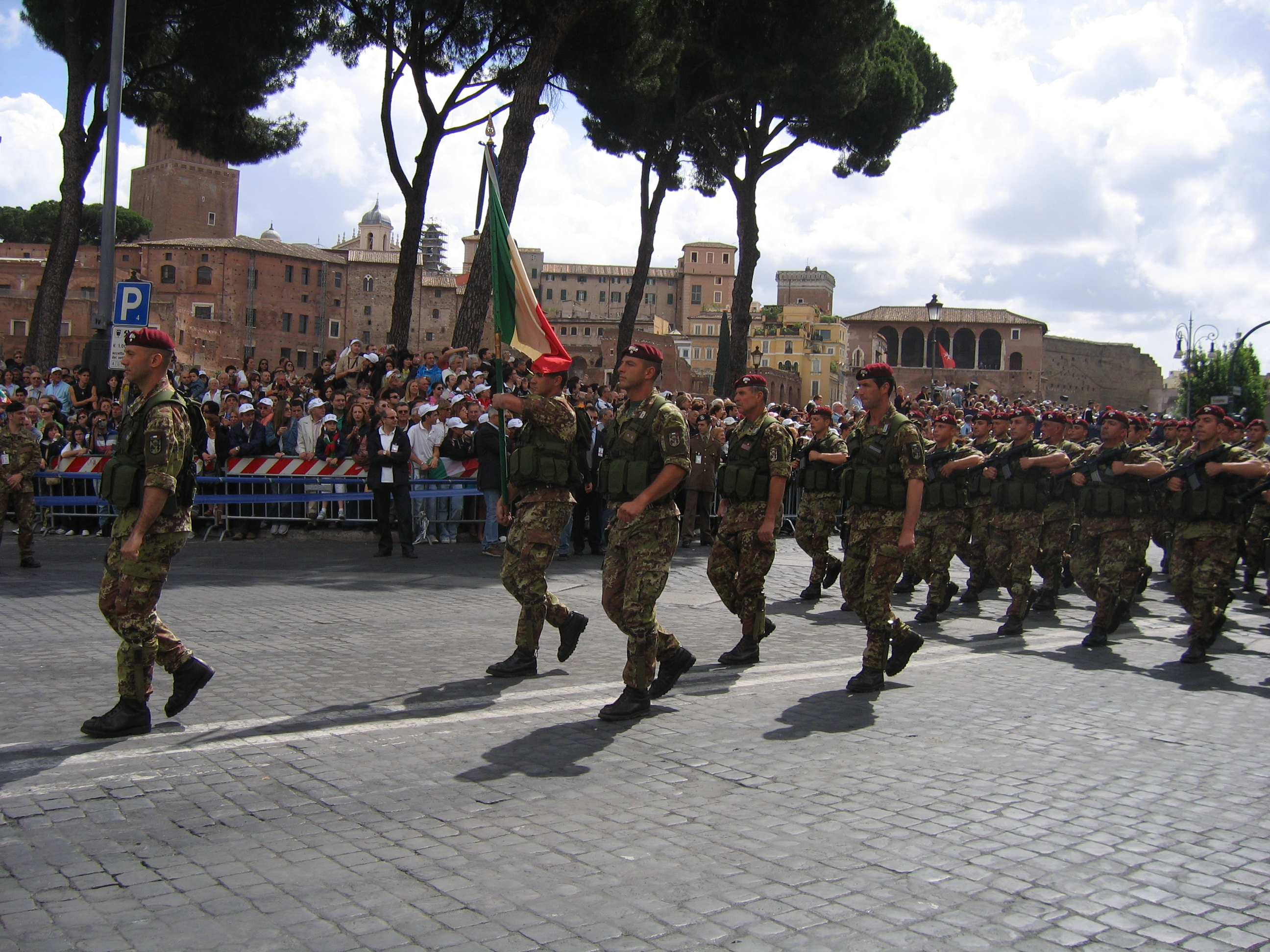
Tuscania parading in 2007

The unit has been involved in all major operations abroad of the Italian Armed Forces:

- Namibia (1989–1990), UNTAG;
- Kurdistan (1991), AIRONE 1;
- Turkey (1991), AIRONE 2;
- Somalia (1992–1994), IBIS (covering UN-sanctioned mission UNITAF): military police and rapid reaction unit;
- Cambodia (1992), UNTAC;
- Somalia (1993), UNOSOM II;
- Israel (2 May 1994 – 8 August 1994), TIPH 1;
- Bosnia and Herzegovina (1996–2003), IFOR/SFOR;
- Palestinian territories (27 January 1996 – 25 July 1996), TIPH 2;
- Albania (1997–1999), Operation Alba: military police services, coordination of military police entities of all other contingents, escort of the mission commander, of the International Commission, of VIPs and journalists, human intelligence, high-risk interventions, liaison with local authorities and Albanian Police, territory surveillance;
- East Timor (1999–2000), United Nations Mission in East Timor;
- Kosovo (2000–2003), Kosovo Force;
- Republic of Macedonia (2001–2002), AMBER FOX;
- Afghanistan (since 2001), ISAF;
- Iraq (since 2003), MSU, Prima Parthica;^{p. 21}
- Gaza Strip (2005–2009), EUBAM RAFAH;
- Palestinian territories (Jericho, March–July 2014), MIADIT PALESTINA;
- Libya (Tripoli, March–July 2014), MMIL.

== Mission ==
Missions entrusted to the regiment are of three broad types:

- Military duties (typical of paratroopers):
  - Entry forces;
  - Military polices;^{p. 20}
  - Quick reaction force by air assault or airborne special operations;
  - Crowd control and riot control (particularly difficult or complex situations);^{p. 23}
  - Support to territorial units of the Carabinieri;

The Carabinieri Regiment "Tuscania" is a Crowning unit for special operations (Italian: Unità di coronamento per le operazioni speciali), i.e. is tasked with the protection and belting of special forces, mainly the Special Intervention Group, as well as operational support to Special Forces units of other Armed Forces.

All members of the Special Intervention Group come from the ranks of the regiment.

=== Support to territorial units ===
The Tuscania Regiment can assist the territorial units of the Carabinieri in the control and surveillance of mountainous or otherwise impervious terrain and the search for dangerous fugitives (alongside the specialized Cacciatori units).

=== Counterterrorism ===
In order to cope with counterterrorism needs, in 2016 the Special Intervention Group and the Tuscania Regiment formed two Counter Terrorism Task Units (Task Unit Anti Terrorismo, "T.U.A.T.") in Central and Northern Italy in order to allow G.I.S. to carry out hostage rescue and urban warfare operations while being protected by the "Tuscania" units.^{p. 4}

The Counter Terrorism Task Units are deployed in sensitive locations and on special occasions; these units are designed in order to be able to anti-irregular forces, executive protection, fighting in urban areas, providing security in areas at risk of terrorisms, and urban counterterrorism when terrorists attack scenarios, as well as hostage rescue.

== Recruitment and training ==
Those aspiring to the regiment, of all ranks, are first submitted to a psycho-physical selection, aimed at ascertaining their attitude toward the specific military occupation. According to former Regimental commander Leonardo Leso, 1 out 30 candidates is accepted. Following the selection then they are admitted to taking a training Explorers Course lasting 44 weeks, including:

- Parachuting course;
- Patrol and platoon-level training (guerilla warfare and counter-insurgency);
- Training in the use of special weapons and materials.

Passing the Explorers Course is the indispensable condition for admission to the ranks of the regiment. Only one candidate out of four attains the rank of Explorer Paratrooper, but the training does not end then. After passing the final test of the course, the paratrooper Carabiniere passes in the battalion, in which performs operational, maintenance training and further specialization activities. In particular, the Paratrooper Carabiniere specializes in:

- Airborne assault
- Shooting with individual and unit weapons;
- Use of special and explosive materials;
- Special fighting techniques;
- Military police techniques;^{p. 24}
- Evasion;^{p. 24}
- Resistance to interrogation;^{p. 24}
- Tactical information gathering.^{p. 24}

== Organization ==
The regiment consists of:

- Command Office: Commander support;
- Training Unit;
- Command and Services Company: logistics support;
- Carabinieri Paratroopers Battalion "Eluet el Asel":
  - Command Platoon
  - 3 Companies
  - Proximity Support Section^{p. 24}

The regiment also has a Sport Parachute Section, which is placed directly under the General Command of the Carabinieri.

=== Regimental Command ===
The Regiment Command has the traditional subdivisions of the Personnel, Operations Training Information, Logistics, Administrations and Health Sections; the Command controls the Training Unit, the Supports Unit and the Paratrooper Carabinieri Battalion. All Regiment personnel is considered capable to be deployed on operations and all personnel is sent on mission on rotational basis. The Training Unit, led by a field officer, provides recruitment, selection and training of the personnel of all ranks. This ensures a standard training.

=== Battalion ===
The Battalion "Eluet el Asel" (named after the battle of Eluet el Asel where the 1st Royal Carabinieri Paratroopers Battalion fought with distinction)^{pp. 100–102} is the operational element of the whole Regiment, and it consists of a Battalion Command and of three operational Paratrooper Carabinieri Companies. The Battalion Command has a limited operational capability to make tactical plans, with a Tactical Command and Pianification Squad, a Specialist Training Squad and of a Proximity Support Section (in charge of weapons and vehicles).

There are also three operational Paratrooper Carabinieri Companies. Each Company has three Platoons specialized in three different combat environments: amphibious warfare, military free fall launch techniques, and mountain warfare. Each of the three Paratrooper Carabinieri Companies include a command element and three Platoons, in turn consisting of 8 Teams of 4 Troops each; the organization is designed in order to operate in urban warfare scenarios and to be transported on a Lince vehicle. Each Team is led by a non commissioned officer, while a Team in each Platoon is led by the Platoon leader, usually a Lieutenant or an expert Marshal. Each Platoon also has specialized troops, organically part of the various Teams: Joint terminal attack controllers, EOD experts, laser-guidance operators, snipers and military rescuers.

== Individual armament ==
Apart from special allocations of certain operators (see, for example Barrett M82), possibly related to the use of squad weapons or to the needs of unconventional warfare, any Tuscania member carries the same sidearm as common Carabinieri, the Beretta 92FS, and, like most Italian paratroopers, the foldingstock SC 70/90 or the shortened SCS 70/90 version of the Beretta AR70/90 assault rifle, M4 Bushmaster assault rifle, or Beretta Model 12 sub-machine gun currently provided to the Italian armed forces. Since 2018, the Carabinieri Paratroopers also have been equipped with the Beretta ARX160 assault rifle.

By the late 1990s, the Beretta rifle has been replaced by a version of the American carbine M4A1 built by Bushmaster and equipment vests are a special version of the Israeli "Ephod" made for the Tuscania regiment by an Israeli firm, Hagor. They also use the HK53 with a British-made 40mm grenade launcher.

== Sports ==
Regiment "Tuscania" also includes a Sport Parachute Unit, which boasts significant results, both in the civil and military spheres, including several world titles achieved in the years 1990, 1994, 1998, 1999.

== See also ==
- Gendarmerie
- Italian special forces
- Paratroopers Brigade Folgore
