= Luigi Efisio Marras =

Italian military officer (1888–1991)

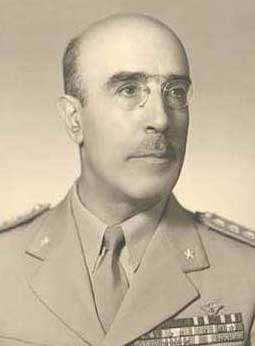

6th Chief of the Defence Staff
- In office 2 December 1950 – 15 April 1954
- President: Luigi Einaudi
- Prime Minister: Alcide De Gasperi; Giuseppe Pella
- Preceded by: Claudio Trezzani
- Succeeded by: Giuseppe Mancinelli

2nd Chief of Staff of the Italian Army
- In office 1 December 1947 – 2 December 1950
- President: Enrico De Nicola (Acting Head of State); Enrico De Nicola; Luigi Einaudi
- Prime Minister: Alcide De Gasperi
- Preceded by: Raffaele Cadorna, Jr.
- Succeeded by: Ernesto Cappa

Personal details
- Born: 2 August 1888 Cagliari, Kingdom of Italy
- Died: 28 January 1991 (aged 102) Rome, Italy
- Education: Royal Academy of Turin

Military service
- Allegiance: Italy
- Branch/service: Royal Italian Army; Italian Army
- Rank: Army Corps General (Lieutenant General)
- Commands: Chief of the Defence Staff; Chief of Staff of the Italian Army
- Battles/wars: World War I World War II
- Awards: Order of Merit of the Italian Republic; Silver Medal of Military Valor; Bronze Medal of Military Valor; War Merit Cross (3); Medaglia militare al merito di lungo comando Croce per anzianità di servizio militare Commemorative Medal for the Italo-Turkish War 1911-1912; Commemorative Medal for the Italo-Austrian War 1915–1918; Commemorative Medal of the Unity of Italy; Allied Victory Medal (Italy); Medaglia commemorativa del periodo bellico 1940-43

Luigi Efisio Marras (Cagliari, 2 August 1888 - Rome, 29 January 1991) was an Italian general who held the positions of Chief of Staff of the Italian Army and Chief of the Defence Staff.

== Biography ==
=== From Birth to Promotion to Colonel ===
Born and raised in Sardinia, Luigi Efisio Marras began his career in 1906 when he began his training at the Military Academy of Turin. After graduating, he served as an officer in various artillery departments. He would later take part in the Italo-Turkish War and was particularly involved in the occupation of the Dodecanese.

During the First World War he fought in the Balkans against the troops of the Central Powers and after the war, he returned home to work in the operations department of the Italian General Staff.

From 1926, he was serving in a field artillery regiment stationed in Livorno and at the same time was a teacher at the local Military Academy. In 1931 he was promoted to colonel and from 1936 he was given command of a heavy artillery regiment.

=== His Actions as Military Attaché to Germany and Later Life ===
In October 1936, Marras was chosen for the delicate task of being a military attaché in Berlin. In this capacity, he was responsible for the North European area and for relations with the Baltic states. Marras, who soon became known for his courteous nature, also wrote numerous reports on the German armaments situation, paying particular attention to the Wehrmacht and the training of personnel in the war academies. He gave an unusually accurate picture of the German war effort in terms of practical and pragmatic training, but also on human aspects and weaknesses such as pride and arrogance.

From July to November 1939, he was active in Rome and Libya and then transferred back to Berlin.

After 8 September in 1943, he was promoted to lieutenant general and then interned in Germany. On 31 March 1944, the German authorities handed him over to the fascists of the Republic of Salò in northern Italy and since then he was imprisoned in Verona then Gavi and finally in Alexandria, but in August of that same year, he managed to escape to Switzerland.

From May 1945, he was at the head of the Territorial Military Command of Milan and from 1 December 1947 he became Chief of Staff and from 2 December 1950 he was Chief of the Defence Staff, contributing significantly to the reconstruction of the Italian Army after the war.

He retired from active service on 15 April 1954 would die in Rome in 1991.
