= Chief of Staff of the Italian Air Force =

- Flag of the Chief of Staff of the Italian Air Force
- Incumbent; Generale di squadra Luca Goretti since 28 October 2021
- Ministry of Defence
- Member of: Italian Air Force
- Reports to: Chief of the Defence Staff
- Formation: 1 January 1926
- First holder: Pier Ruggero Piccio

The Chief of Staff of the Italian Air Force refers to the Chiefs of Staffs of the Royal Italian Air Force from 1926 to 1946 and the Italian Air Force from 1946 to the present.

== List of chiefs of staff ==
=== Kingdom of Italy ===
Flag of the chief of staff of the Royal Air Force

No.	Portrait	Chief of Staff	Took office	Left office	Time in office
1	Pier Ruggero Piccio	Generale di divisione Pier Ruggero Piccio (1880–1965)	1 January 1926	6 February 1927	1 year, 36 days
2	Armando Armani [it]	Generale di squadra Armando Armani (1879–1970)	10 February 1927	13 October 1928	1 year, 246 days
3	Giuseppe Valle	Generale di brigata Giuseppe Valle (1886–1975)	22 February 1930	23 November 1933	3 years, 274 days
4	Antonio Bosio (general) [it]	Generale di divisione Antonio Bosio (general) (1885–1967)	23 November 1933	22 March 1934	119 days
(3)	Giuseppe Valle	Generale di squadra Giuseppe Valle (1886–1975)	22 March 1934	10 November 1939	5 years, 233 days
5	Francesco Pricolo	Generale di squadra Francesco Pricolo (1891–1980)	10 November 1939	15 November 1941	2 years, 5 days
6	Rino Corso Fougier	Generale di squadra Rino Corso Fougier (1894–1963)	15 November 1941	27 July 1943	1 year, 254 days
7	Renato Sandalli	Generale di divisione Renato Sandalli (1897–1968)	27 July 1943	18 June 1944	327 days
8	Pietro Piacentini	Generale di divisione Pietro Piacentini (1898–1963)	19 June 1944	13 December 1944	177 days
9	Mario Ajmone Cat	Generale di squadra Mario Ajmone Cat (1894–1952)	13 December 1944	5 February 1951	6 years, 54 days

=== Italian Republic ===
No.	Portrait	Chief of Staff	Took office	Left office	Time in office
1	Aldo Urbani	Generale di squadra Aldo Urbani	5 February 1951	10 November 1955	4 years, 278 days
2	Ferdinando Raffaelli [it]	Generale di squadra Ferdinando Raffaelli (1899–1981)	10 November 1955	1 February 1958	2 years, 83 days
3	Silvio Napoli [it]	Generale di squadra Silvio Napoli (1902–1961)	1 February 1958	1 September 1961	3 years, 212 days
4	Aldo Remondino [it]	Generale di squadra Aldo Remondino (1908–1990)	1 September 1961	28 February 1968	6 years, 180 days
5	Sergio Duilio Fanali [it]	Generale di squadra Sergio Duilio Fanali (1911–1987)	28 February 1968	1 November 1971	3 years, 246 days
6	Vincenzo Lucertini	Generale di squadra Vincenzo Lucertini (1914–1985)	1 November 1971	27 February 1974	2 years, 118 days
7	Dino Ciarlo [it]	Generale di squadra Dino Ciarlo (1917–2012)	27 February 1974	20 June 1977	3 years, 113 days
8	Alessandro Mettimano	Generale di squadra Alessandro Mettimano (1920–1983)	20 June 1977	1 April 1980	2 years, 286 days
9	Lamberto Bartolucci [it]	Generale di squadra Lamberto Bartolucci (born 1924)	2 April 1980	12 October 1983	3 years, 193 days
10	Basilio Cottone	Generale di squadra Basilio Cottone (born 1926)	19 October 1983	17 September 1986	2 years, 333 days
11	Franco Pisano	Generale di squadra Franco Pisano (1930–2018)	18 September 1986	15 April 1990	3 years, 210 days
12	Stelio Nardini [it]	Generale di squadra Stelio Nardini (1932–2016)	16 April 1990	24 March 1993	2 years, 342 days
13	Adelchi Pillinini [it]	Generale di squadra Adelchi Pillinini (1934–2016)	25 March 1993	3 June 1995	2 years, 71 days
14	Mario Arpino	Generale di squadra Mario Arpino (born 1937)	4 June 1995	5 February 1999	3 years, 246 days
15	Andrea Fornasiero	Generale di squadra Andrea Fornasiero (born 1937)	5 February 1999	3 August 2001	2 years, 179 days
16	Sandro Ferracuti	Generale di squadra Sandro Ferracuti (born 1940)	3 August 2001	4 August 2004	3 years, 1 day
17	Leonardo Tricarico	Generale di squadra Leonardo Tricarico (born 1942)	5 August 2004	19 September 2006	2 years, 45 days
18	Vincenzo Camporini	Generale di squadra Vincenzo Camporini (born 1946)	20 September 2006	30 January 2008	1 year, 132 days
19	Daniele Tei	Generale di squadra Daniele Tei (1946–2011)	30 January 2008	25 February 2010	2 years, 26 days
20	Giuseppe Bernardis	Generale di squadra Giuseppe Bernardis (born 1948)	25 February 2010	25 February 2013	3 years, 0 days
21	Pasquale Preziosa	Generale di squadra Pasquale Preziosa (born 1953)	25 February 2013	30 March 2016	3 years, 34 days
22	Enzo Vecciarelli	Generale di squadra Enzo Vecciarelli (born 1957)	30 March 2016	31 October 2018	2 years, 215 days
22	Alberto Rosso	Generale di squadra Alberto Rosso (born 1959)	31 October 2018	28 October 2021	2 years, 362 days
23	Luca Goretti	Generale di squadra Luca Goretti (born 1962)	28 October 2021	Incumbent	5 years, 5 days

== See also ==
- Italian Armed Forces
  - Chief of the Defence Staff (Italy)
- Royal Italian Air Force
- Italian Air Force
