= Pietro Piacentini =

Italian politician (1898–1963)

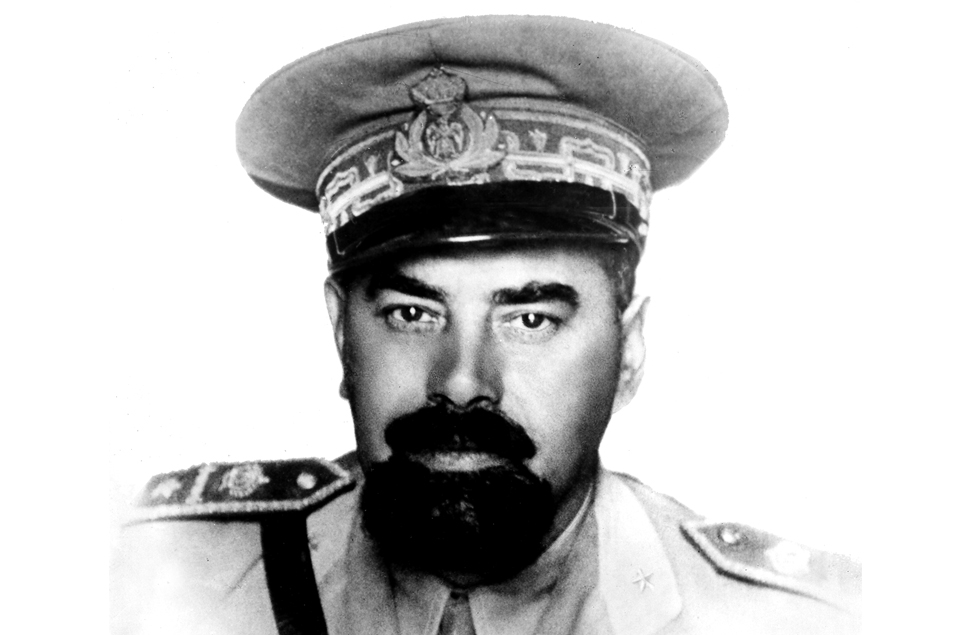

Chief of Staff of the Regia Aeronautica
- In office 18 June 1944 – 12 December 1944
- Preceded by: Renato Sandalli
- Succeeded by: Mario Ajmone Cat

Personal details
- Born: 26 November 1898 Varmo, Kingdom of Italy
- Died: 25 November 1963 (aged 64) Como, Italy
- Awards: Silver Medal of Military Valor (four times); Bronze Medal of Military Valor; Military Order of Savoy

Military service
- Allegiance: Kingdom of Italy
- Branch/service: Royal Italian Army; Regia Aeronautica
- Rank: Air Fleet General
- Commands: XXIX Air Group; Northern Air Sector, Italian East Africa; Italian Co-belligerent Air Force; Air Force Chief of Staff
- Battles/wars: World War I; Italian Front; Macedonian front; Pacification of Libya; Second Italo-Ethiopian War; World War II; East African campaign

Pietro Piacentini (26 November 1898 – 25 November 1963) was an Italian Air Force general during World War II, Minister of the Air Force, and Chief of Staff of the Italian Air Force from 19 June to 12 December 1944.

== Biography ==
He was born in Varmo on 26 November 1898. Having enlisted in the Royal Italian Army in the midst of World War I, in November 1917 he was appointed artillery second lieutenant and later assigned to the Italian expeditionary force in Macedonia. After the end of the war he continued his military career in the 8th Fortress Artillery Regiment, the 2nd Mountain Artillery Group (which had been mobilized and sent to Thessaloniki), the 34th Field Artillery Regiment and the 3rd Artillery Regiment.

In August 1920 he was promoted to the rank of lieutenant; having developed an interest about the world of aviation, he obtained a pilot's license in October 1922, and a military pilot license in February 1923. On October 16 of the same year, he left the Army and joined the newly established Regia Aeronautica.

Between 1923 and 1937 he held various positions at the Ghedi Fighter Aviation Center, the Air Force of the Royal Colonial Corps of Cyrenaica (participating in the Pacification of Libya and being awarded a Silver Medal of Military Valor), the 21st Wing, the 19th Wing, the 13th Wing, the 3rd Fighter Wing, and the 9th Land Bombardment Wing, as well as at the Royal Air Force Academy of Caserta and the Air Warfare School of Florence. On 15 January 1936, he became commander of the XXIX Air Group, at the command of which he participated in the conquest of Ethiopia, being awarded another Silver and a Bronze Medal of Military Valor.

Between July 1937 and December 1939 he held the position of Deputy Chief of Staff of the East African Air Force Command, and later that of commander of the Northern Air Sector in Italian East Africa. In June 1940 he was promoted to Air Brigade General (equivalent to air commodore). After the Kingdom of Italy entered World War II on 10 June 1940, he participated in the operations against the British, planning and personally leading a raid on the British air base at Khartoum in August 1940, for which he was awarded another Silver Medal of Military Valor. He was captured in June 1941 following the fall of Assab, and sent to a prisoner-of-war camp in Kenya and later to India. In December 1943, following the armistice between Italy and the Allies, he was released and returned to Italy, assuming command of the Air Units of the Italian Co-belligerent Air Force on 27 December.

On 19 June 1944 he was appointed Minister of the Air Force in the Bonomi II Cabinet, while also assuming the position of Chief of Staff, with the rank of Air Division General (air vice marshal). The fall of the Bonomi government in December, and the changed political scenario decreed the end of his career; he was also replaced as Chief of Staff of the Air Force by General Mario Ajmone Cat. After the end of the war he was part of the National Council, later joining the Italian Socialist Party. He died in Como on 25 November 1963.

Military offices
Preceded by Renato Sandalli	Chief of Staff of the Regia Aeronautica; 19 June – 12 December 1944	Succeeded by Mario Ajmone Cat
