= Giuseppe Mancinelli =

Giuseppe Mancinelli may refer to:

- Giuseppe Mancinelli (painter)
- Giuseppe Mancinelli (general)
