= Alberto Rosso =

Italian Air Force general

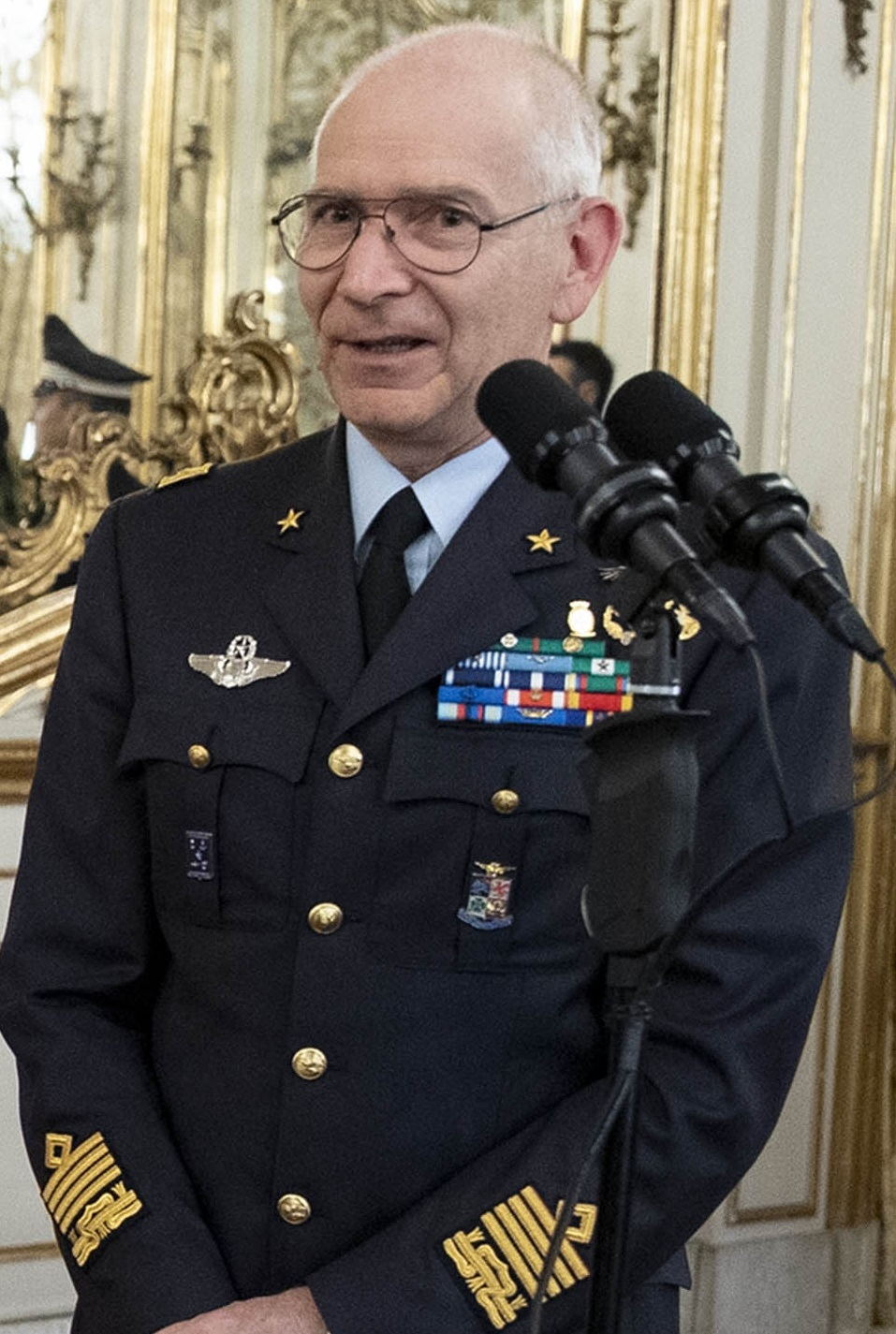
- Rosso in 2019

Chief of Staff of the Italian Air Force
- In office 31 October 2018 – 28 October 2021
- Preceded by: Enzo Vecciarelli
- Succeeded by: Luca Goretti

Personal details
- Born: 29 September 1959 (age 67)

Alberto Rosso (born 29 September 1959) is an Italian Air Force general. He served as Chief of Staff of the Italian Air Force from 31 October 2018 to 28 October 2021.

== Biography ==
After graduating from the Accademia Aeronautica, Corso Urano III, and obtaining a degree in Military Aeronautical Sciences from the University of Naples Federico II, he obtained his military pilot's license in the United States in 1983.

With the rank of lieutenant colonel pilot, he commanded the IX Fighter Group of the 4th Wing in Grosseto Airport from 1994 to 1995, a wing he commanded from 2002 to 2004.He was Head of the 4th Department of the Air Force General Staff (military) from 2011 to 2013 and, from that date, promoted to Air Force Major General, Head of the IV Department of the Defense General Staff.

In July 2014, he was also appointed member of the Board of Directors (CDA) of the Italian Space Agency, representing the Ministry of Defense. Promoted to Air Force General, in June 2016 he was appointed Chief of Staff to the Minister of Defense Roberta Pinotti, a position he retained in 2018 with her successor Elisabetta Trenta.

On October 25, 2018, the Chief of Staff of the Italian Air Force appointed him as the new Chief of Staff of the Italian Air Force, and he took office six days later. He left office on October 28, 2021, when General Luca Goretti succeeded him.

Military offices
Preceded by Enzo Vecciarelli	Chief of Staff of the Italian Air Force; 2018–2021	Succeeded by Luca Goretti
