= Francesco Pricolo =

Italian aviator

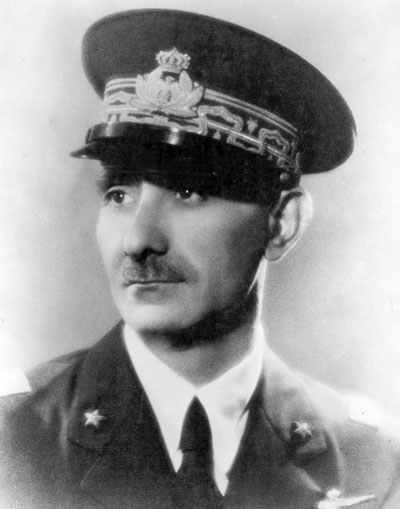

Chief of Staff of the Regia Aeronautica
- In office 31 October 1939 – 15 November 1941
- Preceded by: Giuseppe Valle
- Succeeded by: Rino Corso Fougier

Personal details
- Born: 30 January 1891 Grumento Nova, Kingdom of Italy
- Died: 14 October 1980 (aged 89) Rome, Italy
- Education: Military Academy of Modena; Scuola di applicazione di artiglieria of Turin
- Profession: Military officer

Military service
- Allegiance: Kingdom of Italy
- Branch/service: Regio Esercito; Regia Aeronautica
- Rank: Generale di divisione aerea
- Commands: airship Norge; Airship wing 21º Stormo; 1ª Brigata Aerea da Bombardamento; 2ª Zona Aerea Territoriale (Z.A.T.); 2ª Squadra aerea Chief of Staff of the Air Force
- Battles/wars: Italo-Turkish War; World War I World War II

Francesco Pricolo (30 January 1891 – 14 October 1980) was an Italian aviator. He was undersecretary of Italian Minister of Air Force (currently merged into the Minister of Defence) and the Chief of staff of the Italian Regia Aeronautica during World War II (1939–1941).

== Military career ==
In 1909 he enlisted as a volunteer in Regio Esercito, he enrolled in the Royal Academy of Artillery and Engineers, subsequently attending Scuola di applicazione di artiglieria in Turin. He was appointed second lieutenant of the Engineers in August 1911. He was assigned to the dirigibles Battalion and with it he took part in the Italian-Turkish war of 1910–1911.

He participated in the First World War in the rank of captain of the Engineers, obtained in September 1915. He obtained the airship pilot's license in December 1915, and that of commander in August 1917. During the war he took part in more than sixty missions on board of various airships. For his courage he was decorated with two silver and two bronze medals. Immediately after the war he was assigned command of the airship Norge, he was also made second-in-command of the Accademia Aeronautica and head of the secretariat of the Commander General of Regia Aeronautica.

In 1926 he commanded the airship Wing, in 1928 he was promoted to colonel, from 1 January to 30 May 1928 he commanded the 21st Wing and until 1929 he was chief of staff of the 2nd Territorial Air Zone (2a Zona Aerea Territoriale). Between 1931 and 1932 he commanded the 1st Air Bombardment Brigade (1ª Brigata Aerea da Bombardamento). He was Deputy Chief of Staff of the Regia Aeronautica between December 1932 and October 1933, when he was assigned to command the 2nd Territorial Air Zone (Z.A.T.), in July 1938 he became commander of the 2nd Air Corps (2ª Squadra aerea). On 10 November 1939 he became undersecretary of state and chief of staff of the Air Force.

He commanded the Italian air forces in the first 18 months of the war until 15 November 1941, when he had to leave office both because he was in serious conflict with General Cavallero and because he was not liked by the Germans who held him responsible for the disappointing Italian air operations. In a report in Berlin of 8 October 1941, Rommel insisted that Albert Kesselring be sent to Italy as commander of the German forces in the Mediterranean, and plans made for the conquest of Malta and Bizerte, Rommel further added: "Warn Comando Supremo against the fickleness of the Italian general Pricolo". In the month of November, when the situation on the Libyan front deteriorated due to the British offensive, the new fighter MC. 202 began to arrive from production lines. While the High Command demanded all the planes that are available to be brought to the front, Pricolo ordered the MC 202s to remain in the warehouses, so as not to send them into combat with untrained personnel and without sand filters. This decision, even though motivated by technical reasons, undermined Pricolo in his post of the Chief of Staff of the Air Force, because he was blamed for having delayed the delivery of new aircraft and therefore disobeyed higher orders (14 November 1941). Put on leave on 15 August 1945, he retired in May 1954.

== Contributions to aviation ==
General Pricolo had the insight to start the development of torpedo bombers, which was long opposed by the top leadership of the Air Force and Navy, convinced that it was an "expensive toy". He took to heart the transformation of the SM 79 into a torpedo bomber version, and did everything he could to persuade the managers of the Whitehead Torpedo Factory in Fiume to cancel a German order of submarine torpedoes and to instead produce 80 torpedoes to mount on these airplanes, making SM 79 torpedo bombers operational in August 1940.

Pricolo also worked to build the Macchi C. 202, which was intended to modernize the Regia Aeronautica, whose aircraft, although numerous, were technically unable to compete with the German Messerschmitt Bf 109s and the British Supermarine Spitfires. The big problem to be solved was the engine, because the Fiat A.38 engine did not provide the required power. In January 1940, Pricolo decided to cancel the Fiat A.38 engine project, and ordered the creation of assembly lines to produce the DB 601, the German engine of the Messerschmitt Bf 109, under license from Daimler-Benz, at the Alfa Romeo factory in Milan. This engine, mounted on the Macchi C.200 with a completely redesigned fuselage but unchanged wings and tail, gave rise to the Macchi C 202, whose prototype first took off in Lonate Pozzolo on 10 August 1940.

Military offices
Preceded by Giuseppe Valle	Chief of Staff of the Royal Italian Air Force; 31 October 1939 – 15 November 1941	Succeeded by Rino Corso Fougier
