= Giuseppe Valle (general) =

Italian politician and air force general

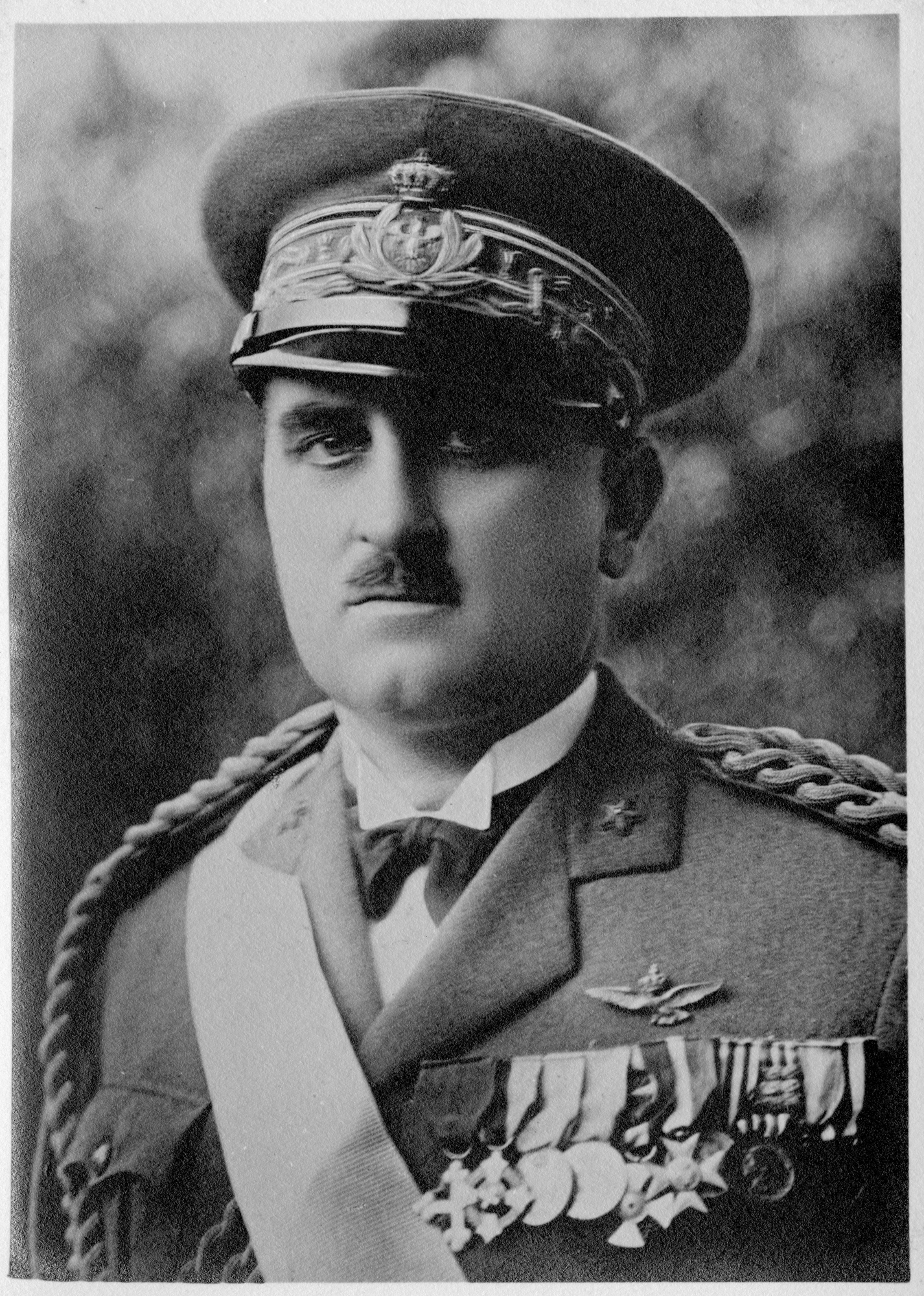

Chief of Staff of the Regia Aeronautica
- In office 22 March 1934 – 10 November 1939
- Preceded by: Antonio Bosio
- Succeeded by: Francesco Pricolo
- In office 22 February 1930 – November 23, 1933
- Preceded by: Antonio Bosio
- Succeeded by: Armando Armani

Personal details
- Born: 17 December 1886 Sassari, Kingdom of Italy
- Died: 20 July 1975 (aged 88) Rome, Italy
- Awards: Silver Medal of Military Valor (twice); War Merit Cross (three times); Military Order of Savoy; Order of the Crown of Italy; Order of Saints Maurice and Lazarus; Colonial Order of the Star of Italy; Croix de Guerre 1914-1918 (France)

Military service
- Allegiance: Kingdom of Italy
- Branch/service: Royal Italian Army; Regia Aeronautica
- Rank: Air Fleet General
- Commands: P 4 (airship); V 2 (airship); M 14 (airship); M 9 (airship); Accademia Aeronautica; Air Force Chief of Staff
- Battles/wars: Italo-Turkish War; World War I; Second Italo-Ethiopian War; Spanish Civil War; World War II

Giuseppe Valle (Sassari, 17 December 1886 – Rome, 20 July 1975) was an Italian Air Force general during the interwar period, Chief of Staff of the Regia Aeronautica from 1928 to 1939 and State Undersecretary for the Air Force from 1933 to 1939. He was also a member of the Chamber of Fasces and Corporations.

== Biography ==
=== Military career ===
After attending the Military Academy of Modena and the School of Application of artillery and Engineers, on 5 September 1907 he was commissioned as second lieutenant. In November 1911 he was assigned to the Army air service, serving on the airship P.1, based in Vigna di Valle; on the following month he was transferred to the airship P.2, participating in operations in Libya during the Italo-Turkish War, remaining there until May 1912.

On 19 June 1914 he was appointed airship commander, and after Italy entered the First World War, on 24 May 1915, he assumed command of P.4; on 30 May he commanded this airship during a bombing raid on the Austro-Hungarian naval base of Pola, with Lieutenant Francesco Pricolo as executive officer. He later commanded airships V.2 (from October 1915 to May 1916) and M.14 as well as serving as director of the Airship Yards of Padua and of Ferrara from November 1915 to May 1916. On 6 May 1916 he carried out a bombing raid with V 2 on the Nabresina railway junction, and on 25 May he carried out another such mission, dropping bombs on the Austro-Hungarian shore installations of Punta Salvore, Istria. From 1 July 1916 to June 1917 he commanded the airship M.9. Altogether, he carried out over a dozen bombing missions against factories, shipyards, military installations and railway junctions in Pola, Nabresina, Trieste, Muggia, Divača, Parenzo and Sistiana, always bringing his airship back to the base despite heavy damage caused by anti-aircraft fire and being awarded two Silver Medals of Military Valor and the Military Order of Savoy.

After the establishment of the Regia Aeronautica in 1923, Valle joined the new armed force with the rank of colonel, assuming the position of commander of the airship group. In 1926 he obtained the seaplane pilot license, being then appointed commander of the newly formed Accademia Aeronautica. In November 1928 he left the command of the Aeronautical Academy to assume the functions of head of the Central State Property Office, and in 1929 he became Deputy Chief of Staff of the Air Force, being then promoted to Chief of Staff on 22 February 1930. Between December 1930 and January 1931 he took part in Italo Balbo's Italy-Brazil transatlantic air cruise. On 10 November 1933, after Benito Mussolini dismissed Balbo from the post of Air Force Minister and assumed that post for himself, Valle left the post of Chief of Staff to assume that of State Undersecretary for the Air Force, reporting directly to Mussolini, who however granted him considerable autonomy, leaving him as de facto Minister of the Air Force. From 22 March 1934 he also resumed service as Chief of Staff of the Regia Aeronautica.

After assuming office, Valle wrote Mussolini a secret report in which he showed that Balbo had inflated the figures on the numbers of available aircraft – a practice he would be in turn accused of by his successor, Francesco Pricolo, years later. In 1939 Valle was appointed national councilor of the Chamber of Fasces and Corporations. In September 1939, during a meeting of the chiefs of staff of the Italian armed forces shortly after the outbreak of the Second World War, he opposed Italy's entry into the war, declaring to Mussolini that the Air Force was unprepared for war. On that occasion Valle proposed to suspend the sale of a batch of Savoia-Marchetti S.79 bombers to Yugoslavia, diverting them to the Regia Aeronautica, but was not listened. On 10 November 1939 he was replaced as Air Force Chief of Staff by General Francesco Pricolo.

After the end of the Second World War, Valle was tried for having exploited his position for illicit enrichment and for having fascistized the Italian Air Force, but was acquitted in 1947.

=== Sports career ===
In his youth Valle was an athlete and one of the founders of the Polisportiva S.S. Lazio, of which he was elected honorary president on 18 March 1932. He was an excellent runner, student champion over the 20 km distance. Between 1913 and 1925 he participated in numerous balloon competitions in France, Belgium, the United States, Switzerland and Spain.

=== Death ===
He died in Rome on 20 July 1975, at age 88.
