= Comando Supremo =

Highest command echelon of the Italian armed forces during World War II

Supreme Command
- Comando Supremo
- Active: 27 June 1941 – 31 May 1945
- Country: Kingdom of Italy
- Type: High command
- Role: Nominally oversaw: Army High Command; Naval High Command; Air Force High Command
- Headquarters: Rome
- Engagements: World War II in the Mediterranean and Middle East; World War II in Europe

Commanders
- Chief of the General Staff: Ugo Cavallero; Vittorio Ambrosio; Giovanni Messe; Claudio Trezzani

Comando Supremo (Supreme Command) was the highest command echelon of the Italian Armed Forces between June 1941 and May 1945. Its predecessor, the Stato Maggiore Generale (General Staff), was a purely advisory body with no direct control of the several branches of the armed forces and with very little staff. Created amidst the exigencies of World War II, Comando Supremo was a large organization with several departments and operational command of the armed forces on the active fronts. At the end of the war, it was reduced to a purely advisory role again.

== Background ==
At the time of Italy's entry into World War II on 10 June 1940, the Italian armed forces were not unified, although Prime Minister Benito Mussolini held the ministries of War, the Navy and Air Force concurrently. On 11 June 1940, King Victor Emmanuel III named Mussolini "Supreme Commander of the Armed Forces Operating on all Fronts". The Stato Maggiore Generale (Supreme General Staff), despite its exalted name, had only seven employees and was a purely advisory body to Mussolini. It did not have direct communication with the ministries and no authority over the staffs of the army, navy and air force. It was led by the Capo di Stato Maggiore Generale (Chief of the General Staff), whose deputy chief was in practice often consulted instead.

== Creation and structure ==
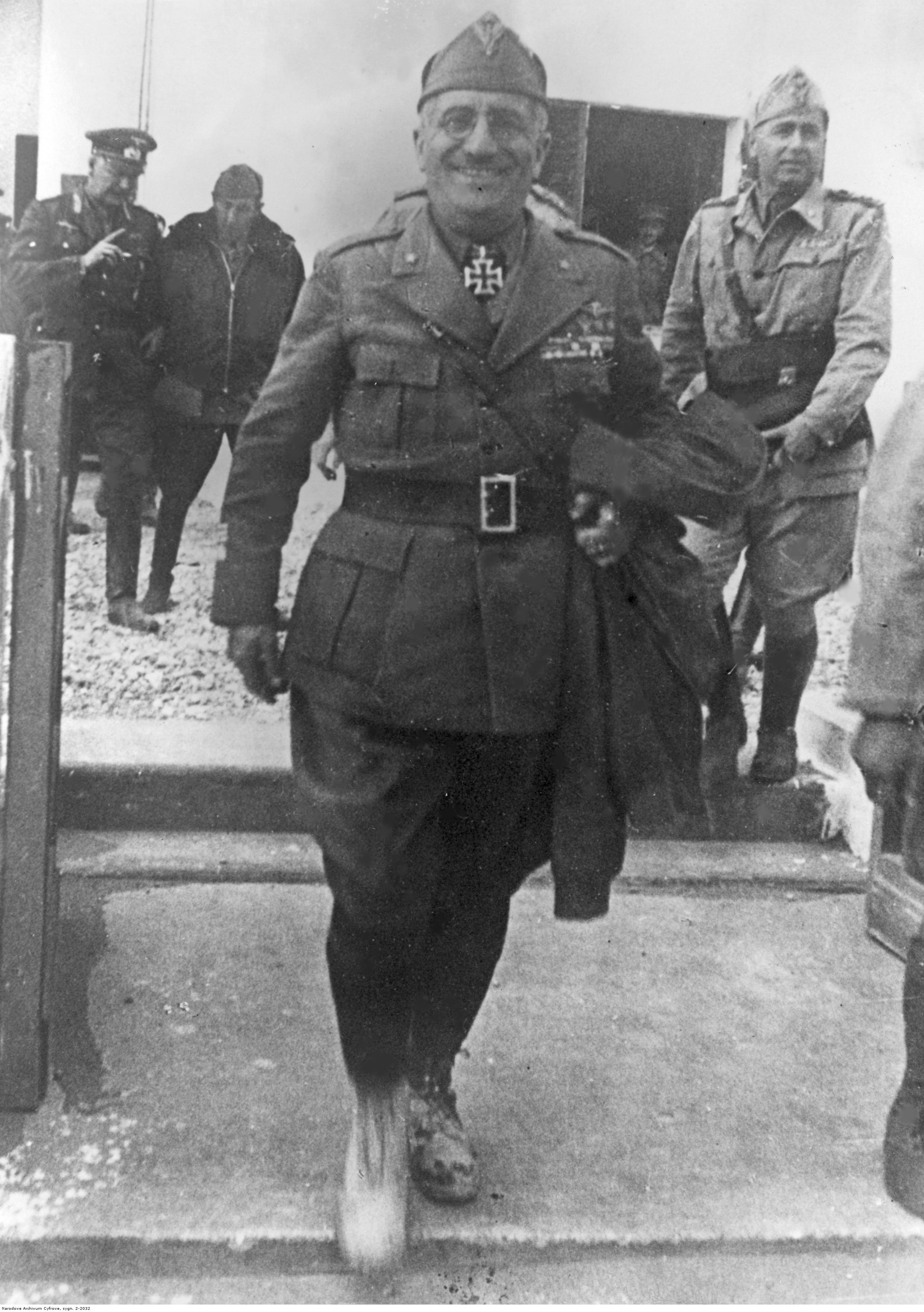
Ugo Cavallero, first chief of Comando Supremo and largely responsible for its organization

Following Italy's disastrous invasion of Greece, the chief of staff, Pietro Badoglio, was dismissed on 6 December 1940. His replacement, Ugo Cavallero, submitted proposals for the Stato Maggiore's complete reorganization to Mussolini on 15 and 19 May 1941. This was implemented in June. The Stato Maggiore Generale was redesignated Comando Supremo. The office of deputy chief of staff was abolished and Comando Supremo was given operational control of the armed forces, standing between them and Mussolini. Comando Supremo acquired the right to command the staffs of the four service branches (army, navy and air force) and of the Milizia Volontaria per la Sicurezza Nazionale (Voluntary Militia for National Security), which was previously directly subordinate to Mussolini as the Duce del Fascismo (Leader of Fascism). Each service now had an operations section at Comando Supremo. In addition, Comando Supremo had direct command of most Italian forces operating outside of Italy.

The new Comando Supremo was much larger than the old Stato Maggiore Generale. The chief of staff was served by a secretary and a generale addetto (attached general) and presided over three departments and three coordinating offices. The First Department contained the offices of operations; organization and training; order of battle; and press and propaganda. The Second Department contained the offices of serves; fuel oils and transportation; and war potential. The Third Department contained the offices of personnel; general affairs (statistics, military law and prisoners); code; and general headquarters. It also included a secretaryship of the general staffs. The three coordinating offices not part of the departments were the Servizio Informazioni Militare (Military Intelligence Service), which was taken over from the ministry of war; the Office of War Economy; and the Office of Communications. Comando Supremo did not control research and development or procurement and production, which matters were left to the service branches.

The Comando Supremo represented a complete transformation of the high command. The chief of staff of the armed forces went from being an advisor with responsibility for planning only to being in direct control of operations on most of Italy's battle fronts. Mussolini retained supreme command, but after June 1941 it was mostly exercised through Comando Supremo. The staffs and ministries of the service branches lost much of their competence. The change was opposed by Mussolini's undersecretaries for navy and air, Arturo Riccardi and Francesco Pricolo, respectively.

== Evolution ==
=== Fascist period, 1941–1943 ===
In November 1941, the Servizio Informazioni Esercito (Army Information Service) was formed at the Ministry of War to cover operational intelligence, leaving only higher-level intelligence to Comando Supremo. In June 1943, the former was renamed Reparto Informazioni Esercito (Army Intelligence Section) and downgraded to operational intelligence collecting, with Comando Supremo resuming its wider remit.

Comando Supremo followed a different trajectory from its German counterpart, Oberkommando der Wehrmacht (OKW). Whereas the German leader Adolf Hitler exercised increasing control over his armed forces as the war progressed, limiting OKW's influence on the Eastern Front, Italy's early defeats forced Mussolini to accept more and more the advice of Comando Supremo. By 1 January 1943, it had direct command of Italian forces operating in Africa, Albania, Croatia, Dalmatia, the Dodecanese, Greece, Montenegro, Slovenia and the Soviet Union.

Under Cavallero, Comando Supremo maintained good relations with Oberbefehlshaber Süd, the command of German forces in Italy. The German military attaché in Rome, Enno von Rintelen, was seconded to Comando Supremo. By early 1943, Cavallero's subservient attitude to the Germans was an embarrassment. On 1 February 1943, he was replaced by Vittorio Ambrosio. On 11 March, Ambrosio reinstated the office of deputy chief of staff and appointed Francesco Rossi. He appointed Giuseppe Castellano as his generale addetto. Although he told Mussolini in their first meeting that he intended to lighten the Comando Supremo's load, its structure remained mostly as it had been under Cavallero.

The division of command between Comando Supremo and the army general staff ceased to have a functional basis in 1943, with the end of active Italian participation on the Eastern Front, the loss of Africa and the Allied invasion of Sicily. According to the division, the defence of Italy fell to the army. Ambrosio did get his nominee, Mario Roatta, appointed chief of the army general staff, but the two were at odds over Germany. Ambrosio wanted to limit German forces in Italy, while Roatta called for reinforcements.

=== Badoglio period, 1943 ===
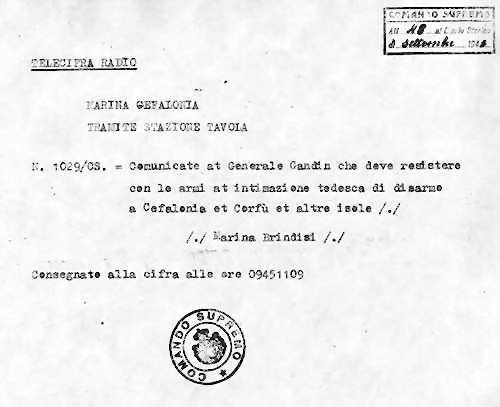
Order from Comando Supremo to the 33rd Infantry Division Acqui on 11 September 1943

The overthrow of Mussolini on 25 July 1943, was planned in Comando Supremo by Castellano. When Victor Emmanuel approved the plan on 20 July, he informed Ambrosio, who made arrangements to arrest Mussolini and bring more troops to Rome. After the appointment of Badoglio as prime minister, the king resumed his command of the armed forces and Comando Supremo became directly subordinate to him. Although Roatta was later to describe this as a return to normality, in fact the situation was entirely new, since nothing like Comando Supremo had existed in Italy before the king delegated his command to Mussolini. The situation was also unusual in that Badoglio disclaimed any authority in military affairs, leaving military matters almost entirely to Comando Supremo. The result was a government in which Ambrosio was the de facto equal of the political head of government, both under the king.

After the signing of the armistice with the Allies on 3 September 1943, Comando Supremo made no effort to notify the other staffs, ministries or headquarters under its command prior to the armistice's publication on 8 September. It had apparently convinced itself that the announcement would come on 12 September. On 9 September, Comando Supremo, along with the king and the government, abandoned Rome for Brindisi.

=== Allied period, 1943–1945 ===
Most of Comando Supremo's records fell into the hands of the Italian Social Republic in September 1943. As a result, many of them were lost in April 1945. On 18 November 1943, Ambrosio was replaced by Giovanni Messe.

On 1 May 1945, Messe was replaced by Claudio Trezzani. On 31 May, on the advice of the minister of war, Alessandro Casati, the lieutenant-general of the realm, Prince Umberto, issued a legislative decree reducing the chief of staff of Comando Supremo to a purely advisory role. This was renamed Stato Maggiore della Difesa (Defence General Staff).

== List of chiefs ==
No.	Portrait	Chief of the General Staff	Took office	Left office	Time in office	Defence branch
1	Ugo Cavallero	General; Ugo Cavallero (1880–1943)	27 June 1941 (Note: Chief of the General Staff since 5 December 1940)	1 February 1943	1 year, 8 months	Royal Italian Army
2	Vittorio Ambrosio	General; Vittorio Ambrosio (1879–1958)	1 February 1943	18 November 1943	9 months	Royal Italian Army
3	Giovanni Messe	General; Giovanni Messe (1883–1968)	18 November 1943	1 May 1945	1 year, 5 months	Royal Italian Army
4	Claudio Trezzani	General; Claudio Trezzani (1881–1955)	1 May 1945	31 May 1945	30 days	Royal Italian Army
