= Aldo Urbani =

Italian Air force chief of staff

- Born: 28 September 1896; Viterbo, Kingdom of Italy
- Died: 5 April 1973 (aged 76); Rome, Italy
- Military career
- Allegiance: Kingdom of Italy; Italy
- Branch: Regia Aeronautica; Italian Air Force
- Rank: Air Fleet General
- Commands: Italian Air Force Academy; 19th Wing; 10th Wing; Air Force of Western Libya; Air Force of Sardinia; Air Force Chief of Staff
- Conflicts: World War I; Second Battle of the Piave River; World War II
- Awards: Silver Medal of Military Valor

Aldo Urbani (Viterbo, 28 September 1896 – Rome, 5 April 1973) was an Italian Air Force general during and after World War II. He was Chief of Staff of the Italian Air Force from 1951 to 1954.

== Biography ==
He was born in Viterbo on 28 September 1896, the son of a senior officer of the Royal Italian Army, and attended the Military Academy of Modena, graduating with the rank of second lieutenant of the Alpini Corps on 30 November 1916, during the First World War. He was then sent to the front and, after having attended a short course as aerostat pilot, he took part in operations as an aerostat observer, earning a Silver Medal of Military Valor when he was wounded during the Second Battle of the Piave River on 16 June 1918, when his aerostat was strafed by Austro-Hungarian fighter planes while flying over the battlefield and providing information on the evolution of the battle.

He was appointed airship officer in August 1920, and in 1923 he joined the newly formed Regia Aeronautica ("Royal Air Force"), becoming airplane observer from May 28, 1924, and obtaining the seaplane pilot license on February 9, 1928, with the rank of major. After having served as deputy commander and later commander of the Air Force Academy from 1931 to 1935, with the rank of lieutenant colonel, he was promoted to colonel in 1935 and assigned to the 19th Wing and later the 10th Wing, being then appointed Chief of Staff of the Air Force of Libya from 1936 to July 1937. In 1938 he was promoted to Air Brigade General (air commodore) and in 1939 he became commander of the Air Force of Western Libya.

From December 1939 until January 1942 he held the position of Chief of Staff of the Ministry of Aeronautics, reaching the rank of Air Division General (air vice marshal) in 1941; from January 1942 to April 1943 he commanded the Air Force of Sardinia, after which he returned to the post of Chief of Staff of the Ministry of Aeronautics until the proclamation of the Armistice of Cassibile on 8 September 1943. After the Armistice, he escaped capture by the Germans. In 1946 he became Air Fleet General (air marshal), from June 1948 he was assigned to the Secretary General of the Air Force, and in October 1948 he was assigned to the High Council of the Armed Forces. From 15 February 1949 he served as Secretary General of the Air Force, and on 5 February 1951 he became Chief of Staff of the Italian Air Force, a post he held until 10 November 1954. He died in Rome on 5 April 1973.

Military offices
Preceded by Mario Ajmone Cat	Chief of Staff of the Italian Air Force; 5 February 1951 – 10 November 1954	Succeeded by Ferdinando Raffaelli
