= Enzo Vecciarelli =

Italian Air Force general

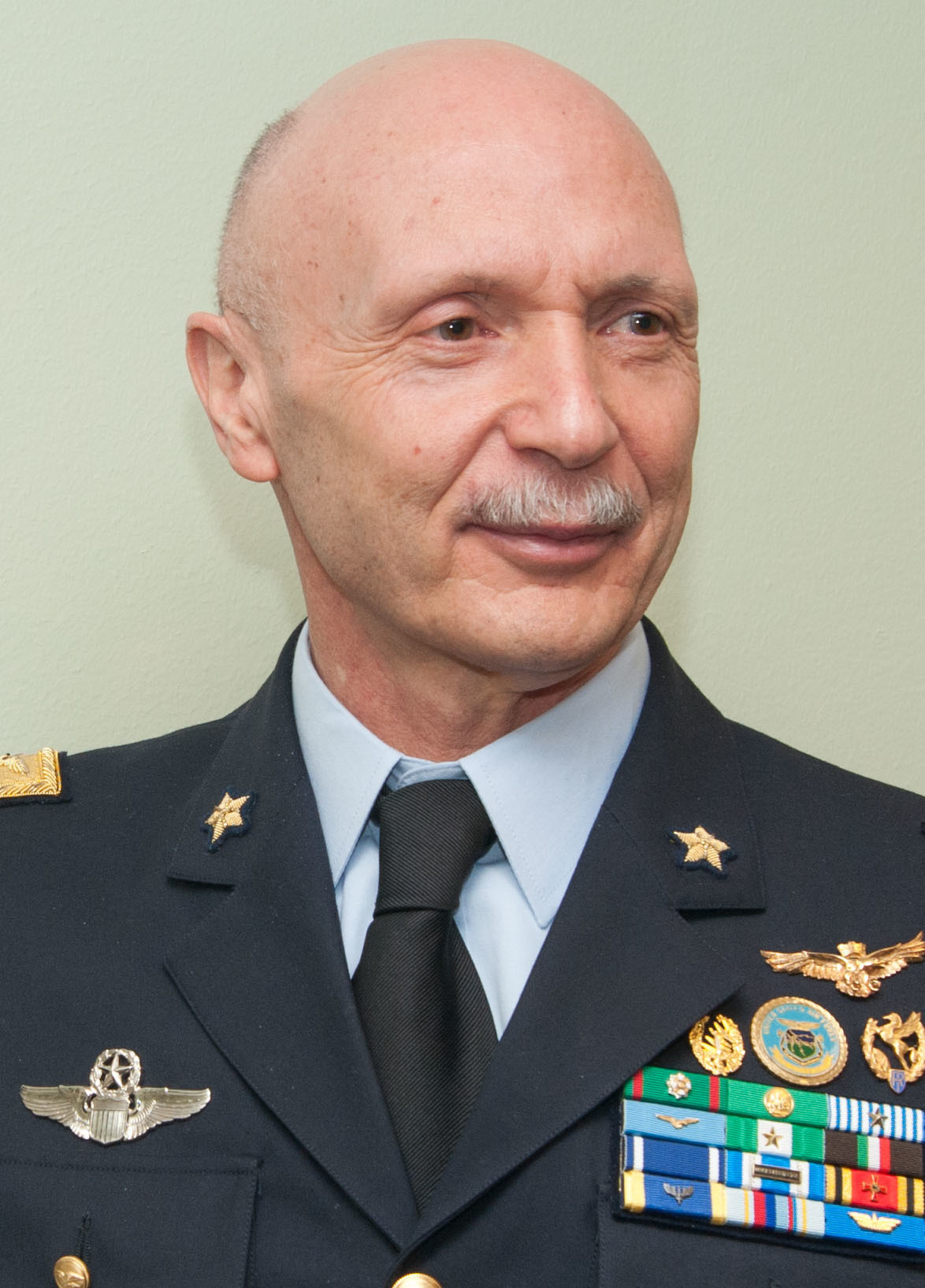
- General Enzo Vecciarelli as Chief of the Defence Staff
- Born: 13 May 1957 (age 69); Colleferro, Italy
- Military career
- Allegiance: Italy
- Branch: Italian Air Force
- Service years: 1975–2021
- Rank: General
- Commands: Chief of the Defence Staff; Chief of Staff of the Italian Air Force; Deputy Chief of Staff of Defence; Air Combat Forces Command; 4° Stormo; 9º Stormo
- Conflicts: Iraq War; Operation Odyssey Dawn; Operation Unified Protector

Air Squadron General Enzo Vecciarelli (born 13 May 1957) is an Italian Air Force officer, former Chief of the Defence Staff of the Italian Armed Forces. He previously served as the Chief of Staff of the Italian Air Force before being appointed Chief of the Defence Staff.

== Background ==
Gen. Enzo Vecciarelli was born in Colleferro, Italy, and attended the Accademia Aeronautica from 1975 to 1979, and graduated in Aeronautical Sciences at the University of Naples Federico II, and in International and Diplomatic Sciences at the University of Trieste.

He earned his pilot's license at the Laughlin Air Force Base in Texas, and his Fighter Pilot Qualification at the Holloman Air Force Base, in New Mexico. He attended various courses such as the Normal Course and Superior Course of the Air War School in Florence, the Air War College at the Air University at the Maxwell Air Force Base in Alabama, the Defense Resource Management Course at the Naval Postgraduate School in Monterey, California and the EVENING (Session Européenne des Responsables d'Armement) at the Centre des Hautes Etudes de l'Armement - École Militaire in Paris

Vecciarelli is a well-trained Fighter and Interceptor pilot, and held positions in the Italian Air Force such as commander of the 9º Stormo (9th Fighter Group) in 1991, and the 4° Stormo (4th Wing) from 1999 to 2002, achieving in total over 2600 hours of flight, most of his time spent flying the Lockheed F-104 Starfighter. From 1993 to 1999 he was stationed at the Personnel Division of Air Force Staff and from 2002 to 2004, he served at the Air Force Logistic Command Staff. He was assigned to the National Armament Directorate as the Deputy Chief of the III Division Armaments Policy Department, where he also holds the position as the National Representative in the European Defence Agency, and the Organisation Conjointe de Coopération en matiere d’Armament (OCCAR). He also launched the “Letter of Intent” for the overall materialization of the restructuring of the European Defence industry.

Vecciarellialso served as the commander of the Italian Air Force Contingent in Iraq during the Iraq War at the Nasiriya Air Base under the “Ancient Babylon Operation” framework. From 2007 to 2010, he was served at the Italian Embassy in Berlin as a Defence and Air Force Attaché with secondary accreditation for The Netherlands and Denmark.

He became the Commander of the Air Combat Forces Command during Operation Odyssey Dawn and Operation Unified Protector in Libya, and became the Chief of Staff of the Air Operations Command. He became the Deputy Chief of Staff of Defence from February 2015 to February 2016, and was named as the Chief of Staff of the Italian Air Force from March 2016 to November 2018. He was appointed by President Sergio Mattarella as the new Chief of the Defence Staff on 6 November 2018, replacing General Claudio Graziano, who was named Chairman of the European Union Military Committee.

== Awards ==
- Knight Grand Cross Order of Merit of the Italian Republic
- Great Cross of Merit of the Federal Republic of Germany
- Medal of Merit Santos Dumont from the Brazilian Defense Ministry
- NATO medal for the former Yugoslavia

== Personal life ==
He is married to Mrs. Amelia Vecciarelli, and they have two children, named Claudio and Federica.

Military offices
Preceded by Pasquale Preziosa	Chief of Staff of the Italian Air Force; 2016–2018	Succeeded by Alberto Rosso
Preceded by Claudio Graziano	Chief of the Defence Staff; 2018-2021	Succeeded by Giuseppe Cavo Dragone
