= Ursel Air Base =

Air Base in Belgium

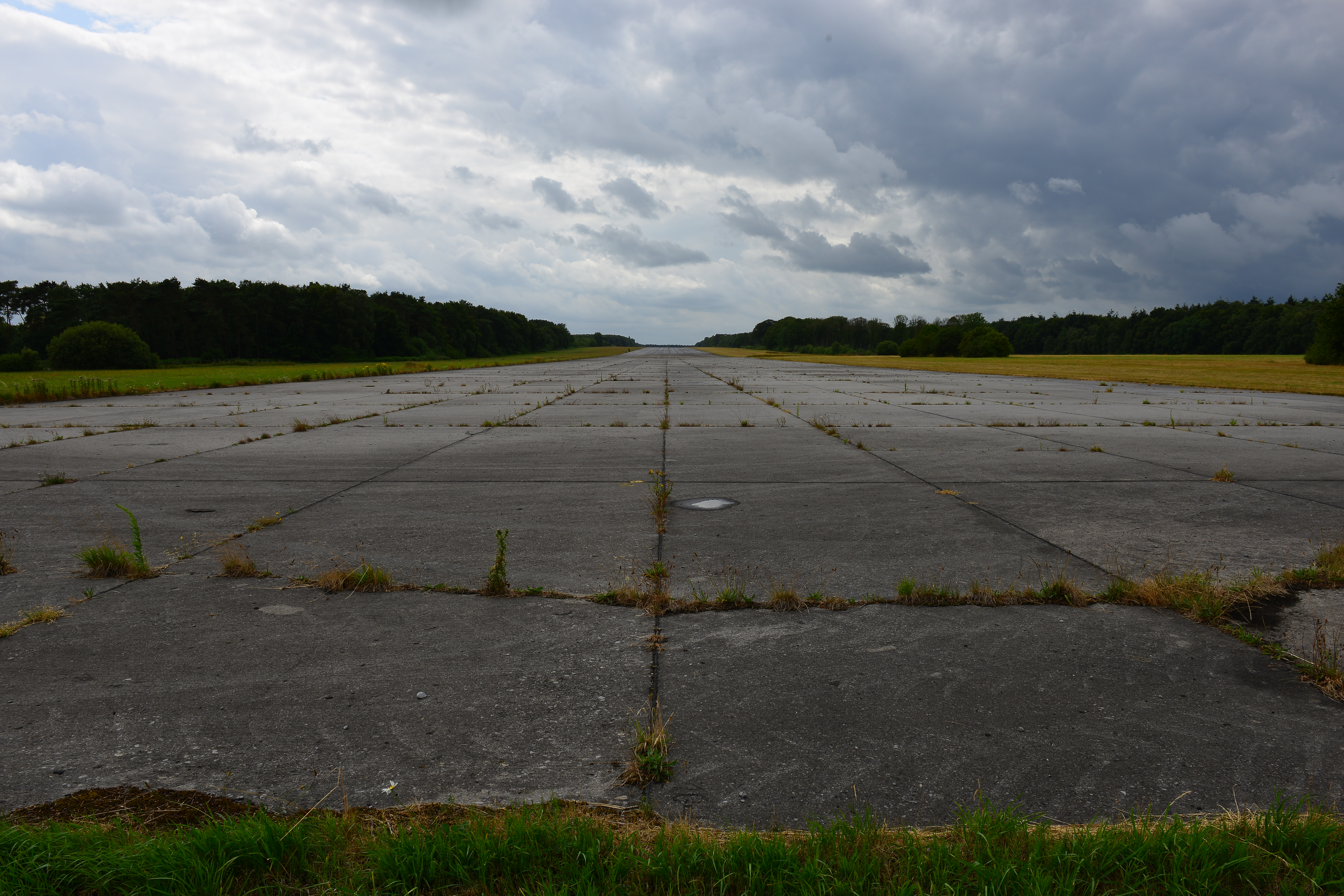
- IATA: none; ICAO: EBUL

Summary
- Airport type: Military/Public
- Operator: Belgian Air Force
- Serves: Ursel
- Location: Belgium
- Elevation AMSL: 87 ft (27 m)
- Coordinates: 51°08′39″N 003°28′32″E

Map
- Location in Belgium

Runways
Direction	Length		Surface
Direction	m	ft	Surface
07/25	2,980	9,777	Concrete
- Sources: Belgian AIP

Ursel Air Base (ICAO: EBUL) is a joint public/military airport located 10 km (6 miles) southwest of Eeklo near Ursel, East Flanders, Belgium.

== History ==
The airfield was established in the summer 1939 for the Belgian Air Force. The 14th Company Aviation-Auxiliary laid down a grass landing strip 2,950 feet (900 meters) long. On 11 May 1940, the Belgian Air Force moved Fairey Foxes and Renard R16s for attacking the German invaders here. Five days later the airfield was bombed for the first time by the Germans, that occupied the badly damaged base on the 27th of May. After the Battle of Belgium was over, it was taken over by the Luftwaffe and used as an airfield during the German occupation period. In July 1940, the runway was re-laid in concrete and hangars and operational buildings restored. In autumn 1940, the Germans assigned the airfield to the Corpo Aereo Italiano, the air corps sent by Regia Aeronautica for operations against Britain. Ursel was the base of 18° Gruppo, equipped with 50 Fiat CR.42 fighters, that arrived on the 19th of October. Italian occupation created a diplomatic break between Italy and the Belgian government in exile which led to a Belgian offensive against Italian East Africa.

The area was liberated by British Army forces in September 1944, and the Royal Engineers converted the airfield to Royal Air Force (RAF) use, designating the field as Advanced Landing Ground B-67. Four squadrons of Hawker Typhoon fighter-bombers operated from the field, their mission being to break the resistance of German troops at the Dutch island of Walcheren, which controlled the entrance to the harbours of Antwerp. Once the entrance to Antwerp was cleared, the RAF moved out and the airfield was abandoned.

Ursel was used during Exercise Reforger 76 in August/September 1976, for the re-assembly of United States-based US Army helicopters arriving by ship into the Port of Zeebrugge for onward deployment to Kitzingen Army Airfield, West Germany.

Ursel remains a reserve base for the Belgian Air Force. It is available for civilian recreational use during weekends, and hosts two aeroclubs.

== Bibliography ==
- Haining, Peter The Chianti Raiders The Extraordinary Story of the Italian Air Force in the Battle of Britain London Robson 2005 ISBN 1-86105-829-2

== See also ==
- List of airports in Belgium
