= Biagio Abrate =

Italian general

OMRI Biagio Abrate
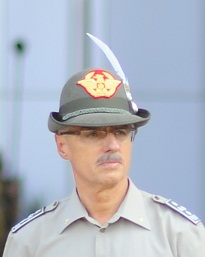
- Born: 8 November 1949 (age 76); Cuneo, Italy
- Military career
- Allegiance: Italy
- Branch: Italian Army
- Rank: General
- Commands: Chief of the Defence Staff

Biagio Abrate, Knight Grand Cross (born 8 November 1949) is a retired Italian general who served as Chief of Defence Staff.

== Life and career ==
Born in Sant'Albano Stura, he was admitted at Military Academy of Modena and he graduated with the rank of tenente in 1974. From 1975 to 1979 he held the posts of platoon and company commander in various battalion of mountain infantry, from 1979 he held a position at the Alpini Formation Center in Aosta. From 1987 to 1990 he had his staff assignment and from 1990 to 1992 he led Bassano alpine infantry battalion in Innichen. After other staff duties he led Alpine Brigade Taurinense from 1998 to 2000, from July to November 2000 he led Multinational Brigade West in Kosovo. From 2001 to 2007 he led the staff of Italian Minister of Defence serving under 3 different ministers. In 2007 he was named head of the Italian procurement defence agency. In 2010 the Italian president Giorgio Napolitano following the advice of the council of ministers named Abrate Chief of the Defence Staff.

== Honour ==
- Italy: Knight Grand Cross of the Order of Merit of the Italian Republic (10 february 2010)

Military offices
Preceded by Vincenzo Camporini	Chief of Staff of the Italian Armed Forces; 2011 – 2013	Succeeded by Luigi Binelli Mantelli
