= Flugplatz Maldegem =

Former WW II airfield in Belgium

Flugplatz Maldegem Advanced Landing Ground B-65

Site information
- Type: Military Airfield

Location
- Coordinates: 51°11′53″N 003°28′41″E

Site history
- In use: 1939–1945
- Battles/wars: World War II

Location of Flugplatz Maldegem, Belgium

Flugplatz Maldegem is a former World War II airfield, located 2.8 km southeast of Maldegem in East Flanders, Belgium.

== History ==
Established in 1939 by the Belgian Air Force. After the Battle of Belgium, the Luftwaffe took over the airfield and began expanding it, putting down a concrete runway. Between October 1940 and April 1941 the airfield was used by Fiat G.50s of the Corpo Aereo Italiano, an expeditionary force from the Regia Aeronautica ("Royal Air Force") that participated in the Battle of Britain and the Blitz during the final months of 1940 during World War II. From 1941 onwards Luftwaffe squadrons (III./JG 53 and II./JG 26) began operating from the airfield.

It was seized by British Forces in September 1944, and Royal Engineers repaired the field, designating it "Advanced Landing Ground B-65". It became home to the 135 Wing.

It was abandoned after the war, the facility being redeveloped into an industrial area.
