= Raffaele Cadorna Jr. =

Italian politician (1889–1973)

The Honourable General Raffaele Cadorna Jr.
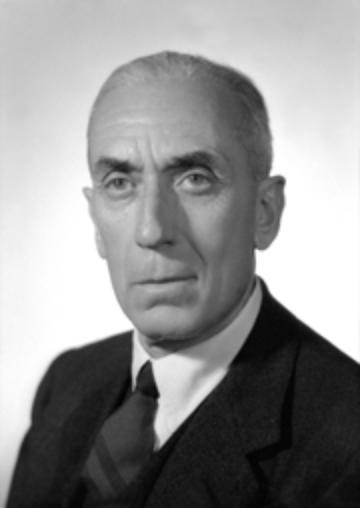

Member of the Senate of the Republic
- In office 8 May 1948 – 15 May 1963
- Constituency: Verbano-Cusio-Ossola

Personal details
- Born: 12 September 1889 Verbania, Italy
- Died: 20 December 1973 (aged 84) Rome, Italy
- Party: Christian Democracy
- Relations: Luigi Cadorna (father), Raffaele Cadorna (grandfather)
- Education: Military Academy of Modena
- Profession: Military officer
- Awards: Interallied Medal; Bronze Star Medal; Legion of Merit
- Website: Senate website

Military service
- Allegiance: Kingdom of Italy
- Branch/service: Royal Italian Army
- Years of service: 1909–1947
- Rank: Lieutenant General
- Commands: Ariete Armoured Division; CLN
- Battles/wars: Italo-Turkish War; First World War; Italian Front; Second World War; Italian campaign; Italian Civil War

Raffaele Cadorna Jr. (12 September 1889 – 20 December 1973) was an Italian military officer who fought during World War I and World War II. He is best known for being one of the commanders of the Italian Resistance against German occupying forces in northern Italy after 1943.

== Early life ==
Cadorna was born in Verbania in 1889, the son of the First World War Field Marshal Luigi Cadorna and grandson of General Raffaele Cadorna. In 1909 he was named sub-lieutenant, becoming part of the Italian troops that fought the Italo-Turkish War. During the First World War, he was a lieutenant and later promoted to captain. In the early years of the 1920s, he was part of the Allied commission for the new border of Germany. He was later named military attaché to the Italian embassy in Prague.

In 1935 he opposed the decision of Benito Mussolini to invade Ethiopia. Two years later he was promoted to the rank of colonel as commander of Italy's Regiment "Savoia Cavalleria" (3rd).

== World War II ==
During the early years of World War II, he took part in some actions against France, and was then named commander of the school of cavalry in Pinerolo. On 1 April 1943 he was named commander of the 135th Armored Cavalry Division "Ariete", one of the strongest divisions of the Regio Esercito. After the Armistice of Cassibile was announced on 8 September 1943 the Ariete participated in the defense of Rome against the German attack, but was disbanded after the military commander of Rome, General Calvi di Bergolo, had signed a ceasefire with the German commands.

On 11 August 1944 he was parachuted into Val Cavallina near Bergamo and appointed Military commander of the Gruppo Volontari per la Libertà ("Group of Volunteers for Freedom"), with Ferruccio Parri, and deputy commander Luigi Longo, in north central Italy. Captain W O Churchill was seconded by Special Operations Executive (1944/45 Operation Floodlight) to act as British Liaison Officer to General Cadorna at the request of the CLNAI in northern Italy.

In April 1945, he was a member of the partisan delegation that tried to reach an agreement with Mussolini in the archbishop's palace of Milan.

On 15 June 1945 he was awarded the Patriot's Certificate, a decoration reserved to those who had contributed to the Italian resistance movement. He was also awarded the Legion of Merit – Degree of Commander for service between September 1943 to May 1945 (General Order 124, 27 December 1945).

In July 1945 he was named chief of staff of the Italian Army. In 1947 he resigned from this post due to different points of view with the Minister of Defence.

== Later life ==
From 1948 to 1963 he was a senator of the Christian Democracy party. He enrolled in the Mixed Group and became President of the Senate 4th Permanent Commission for Defence sector. Subsequently, he was promoted Army corps general of the military reserve force. In 1953, Cadorna was re-elected at the Senate and in 1959 resulted the first among the non-elected candidates. He became deputy in the seat of Teresio Guglielmone after the latter's death on 24 January 1959. In 1961 he returned to be a member of the Italian Chamber of Deputies Defence Commission and remained in charge until the legislature's term in 1963.

In 1964, along with Randolfo Pacciardi, Tomaso Smith, Alfredo Morea, Mario Vinciguerra, Ivan Matteo Lombardo, the journalist Giano Accame (1928–2009), Salvatore Sanfilippo, Alberto Rossi Longhi, Giuseppe Mancinelli and Giuseppe Caronia, Cadorna was the first to sign the manifesto of the Democratic Union for the New Republic, a complex plan which proposed the introduction of Presidentialism within the constitutional parliamentary form of the State. The related political movement melted down in 1968 when none of its candidates was elected.

He died in Rome in 1973.

== Bibliography ==
- Giuseppe Sircana, «CADORNA, Raffaele». In: Dizionario Biografico degli Italiani, Volume 34, Roma: istituto dell'Enciclopedia Italiana, 1988

== See also ==
- Italian Social Republic
- Enrico Martini, a fellow recipient of the Bronze Star Medal.
