= Corpo Aereo Italiano =

Italian expeditionary force during the Battle of Britain

Italian Air Corps
- Corpo Aereo Italiano
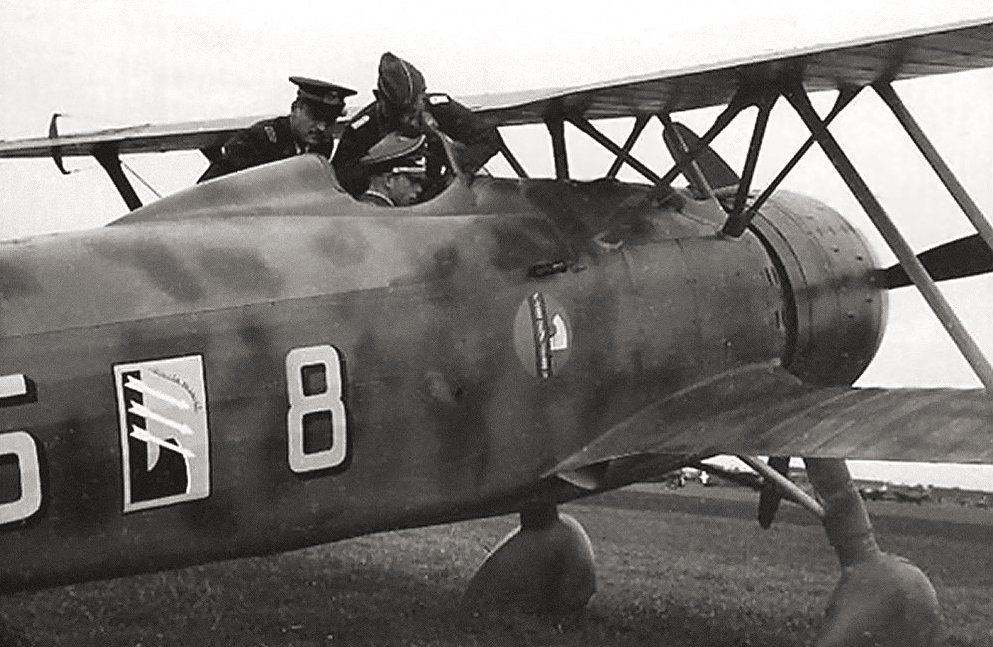
- An Italian Fiat CR.42 of the CAI deployed in Belgium
- Active: 10 September 1940 – April 1941
- Country: Kingdom of Italy
- Branch: Regia Aeronautica
- Type: Expeditionary air force
- Role: Aerial warfare
- Engagements: World War II: Battle of Britain; The Blitz

Commanders
- Notable commanders: Generale di Squadra Aerea Rino Corso Fougier

The Corpo Aereo Italiano (CAI; lit. 'Italian Air Corps') was an expeditionary force from the Italian Regia Aeronautica that participated in the Battle of Britain and the Blitz in the final months of 1940 during World War II. The CAI supported the German Luftwaffe and flew against the British Royal Air Force (RAF) and Fleet Air Arm (FAA). The CAI achieved limited success during its brief existence, but it was generally hampered by the inadequacy of its equipment.

== Formation ==
The Italian dictator Benito Mussolini insisted on providing an element of the Italian Royal Air Force (Regia Aeronautica) to assist his German ally during the Battle of Britain. On 10 September 1940, the CAI was formed, under the formal aegis of the 1a Squadra Aerea di Milano (1st Milan Air Command). Generale di Squadra Aerea Rino Corso-Fougier was appointed Air Officer Commanding.

== Aircraft ==
- Fiat CR.42 of 18° Gruppo, 56° Stormo. The Italian CR.42 was a manoeuvrable and fast biplane fighter. Despite its good manoeuvrability and speed (440+ km/h) it was technically outclassed by the faster and better armed Hurricanes and Spitfires of the British Royal Air Force.
- Fiat G.50 Freccia of 20° Gruppo, 56° Stormo. The Italian G.50 monoplane fighter was restricted by its range of 400 miles (640 km), which was roughly the same as that of Bf 109E models used by the Luftwaffe, and the lack of a radio unit in most participating aircraft.
- Fiat BR.20 bombers of 13° and 43° Stormo. The Italian BR.20 was a twin-engined bomber capable of carrying 1,600 kg (3,530 lb) of bombs.

Supporting aircraft included six CANT Z.1007bis of 172a Squadriglia used for reconnaissance and Caproni Ca.133 transport planes.

On 25 September, the bombers arrived at their airfield in Melsbroek, Belgium after an eventful journey in which several planes force landed or even crashed due to malfunctions and poor weather. The fighters arrived later: the 50 Fiat CR.42s were based at Ursel, while the 45 Fiat G.50s in Flugplatz Maldegem, Belgium.

As late as 4 November, a Time magazine article only indicated that there was a possibility that an Italian air force unit might be sent to participate in the Battle of Britain.

== Operations ==
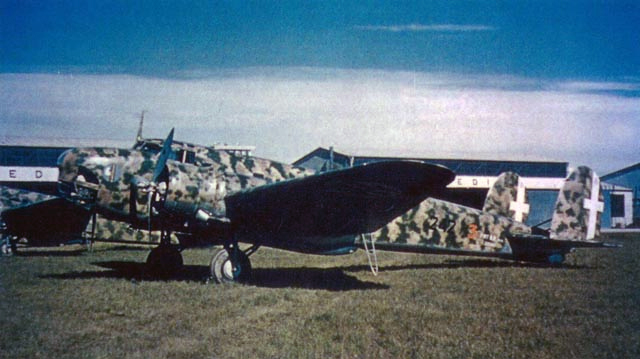
Fiat BR.20M MM.22267 of 242^{a} squadriglia on the airfield. This particular plane was shot down on 11 November 1940.

On the night of 24/25 October 1940, the CAI conducted its first raid, when 18 BR.20s took off to attack Harwich and Felixstowe. Not all aircraft found their targets and three were lost in accidents. The Harwich Gun Defence Area (GDA) covering the ports of Harwich, Felixstowe, Ipswich and Parkeston was manned by 99th (London Welsh) Heavy Anti-Aircraft Regiment, Royal Artillery. However, the number of heavy AA guns in the GDA had dwindled to eight by September 1940 as they had been redeployed to guard the RAF's vital fighter airfields.

The next major operation of the CAI was on 29 October. This date is regarded by some historians as the last day of the Battle of Britain. In response to a raid on several northern Italian cities, fifteen BR.20s with a strong CR.42 fighter escort bombed Ramsgate by day. The Italian bombers were sighted crossing Kent at a relatively low level. The bombers flew in formation, wingtip to wingtip. The open-cockpit, fixed-undercarriage fighter escorts accompanied them in a similar immaculate order. The Italian aircraft were painted pale sand yellow with green and red-brown mottling. This was camouflage more suitable for a more exotic climate than that found in Britain in late October. Five Italian aircraft suffered damage due to anti-aircraft guns. At least one of the bombers was seen at 16:40 hours in Deal, Kent that afternoon, some 14 miles from Ramsgate and dropped three high-explosive bombs, one just outside the Officers' Mess at the Royal Marine Depot, Deal, killing Second Lieutenant Nelson, four Marines, and one private from the King's Shropshire Light Infantry. All but one were buried together in the Hamilton Road Cemetery, Deal.

The next few days saw several small raids.

On 11 November 1940, the day before the battle fleet of the Regia Marina (the Italian navy) was attacked at Taranto by the Royal Navy's aircraft and as a result lost half of its capital ships, the CAI saw its first major combat against the RAF. Ten bombers were escorted by forty-two CR.42s, G.50s, and some German Messerschmitt Bf 109s assigned to them. The G.50 mission was aborted due to bad weather that caused too much fuel consumption and the Fiat monoplanes had to go, leaving only the CR.42 as escort. However, Hurricanes from several units, belonging to 257, 46, and 42 (Note: There is still much confunsion about the involved units, depending on the sources they were for sure No.46 and 257 Sqn, that made some claims to BR.20s; often cited are also No. 245, 249 and No.17, plus one or more Spitfire from No.41 Sqn; Gustavson quotes No.257, 17, 46, 249, but apparently only No.46, 249 and 257 made contact with italians, plus one or more Spitfire from No.41.(source)) Squadrons intercepted the aircraft and destroyed three bombers and two fighters, while another was lost to mechanical fault or navigation error, the pilot (Salvatori) was captured. In addition, four bombers eventually force landed, two fighters were destroyed on landing, and another eight fighters landed with damage, with over 20 aviators missing, dead or wounded. British had two fighters slightly damaged. One of the Fiats (MM.5701) was repaired by the British and subsequently evaluated by Eric Brown; this is one of the best conserved CR.42s, and it is owned by a UK museum (Hendon).

Fighter to fighter combat was no more successful for the CAI. On 23 November, 29 Italian fighters making an offensive sweep were engaged near the South Foreland. The Italian biplanes were "bounced" by Spitfire Mk.IIs and two were shot down by Archibald Winskill with several others damaged, in return for one Spitfire damaged (though the Italian pilots claimed the destruction of at least five British fighters).

Further bombing raids were carried out by the CAI, mainly on the Harwich and Ipswich areas.

By the end of December, shortly before its redeployment, the CAI had flown 97 bomber sorties, for the loss of three aircraft. The Italian planes had dropped 44.87 tonnes of bombs in 77 night sorties, most of them over Harwich.

Between October 1940 and January 1941 the CAI fighters flew 454 offensive and 480 defensive sorties (including 113 bomber escort).

== Redeployment ==
Near the beginning of January 1941, all of the bombers and biplanes were redeployed. This left the CAI with only the Fiat G.50s, which remained until mid-April 1941, when they too were redeployed.

From January to April 1941 the two remaining squadrons based in Belgium flew a further 662 defensive sorties.

== Biplane versus monoplane ==
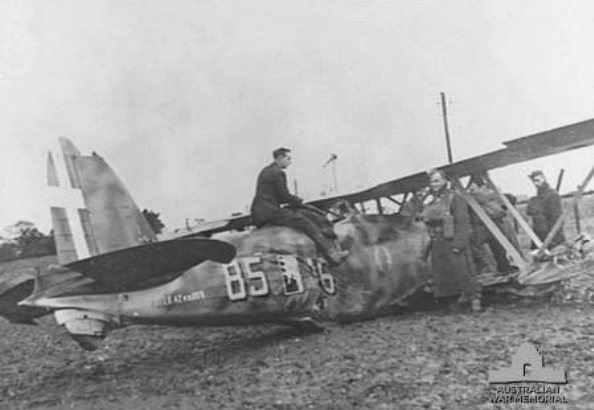
A Falco biplane fighter after crash-landing near Lowestoft, Suffolk on 11 November 1940. The pilot successfully evaded three British Hurricanes, but was forced down by a propeller malfunction.

Although the main fighter used by the Corpo Aereo Italiano was a biplane, which, in purely technical terms, would be outclassed by more modern monoplanes, this was not the case all the time. On 11 and 23 November 1940, CR.42s flew two raids against Great Britain as part of the Corpo Aereo Italiano. Although the German Luftwaffe aircraft had difficulty flying in formation with the slower biplanes, the Falcos, though slower, and with an open cockpit, no radio, and armed with only two machine guns (a 12.7 mm/.5 in and a 7.7 mm/.303 in Breda-SAFAT), could easily out-turn Hurricanes and Spitfires, making them difficult to hit. "The CR 42 turned to fight using all the aeroplane's manoeuvrability. The pilot could get on my tail in a single turn, so tightly was he able to pull round." As the RAF intelligence report stated, the Falcos were hard targets. "As I fired he half rolled very tightly and I was completely unable to hold him, so rapid were his manoeuvres. I attacked two or three more and fired short bursts, in each case the enemy aircraft half-rolled very tightly and easily and completely out-turned me. In two cases as they came out of their rolls, they were able to turn in almost on my tail and opened fire on me."

Against British monoplanes, the CR.42s were not always outclassed. "I engaged one of the British fighters from a range of between 40 to 50 metres (130–165 ft). Then I saw a Spitfire, which was chasing another CR.42, and I got in a shot at a range of 150 metres (500 ft). I realised that in a manoeuvered flight, the CR.42 could win or survive against Hurricanes and Spitfires, though we had to be careful of a sweep from behind. In my opinion, the English .303 bullet was not very effective. Italian aircraft received many hits which did no material damage and one pilot even found that his parachute pack had stopped a bullet."

== Summary of bombing operations ==
CAI operations
Date	Target	Bomber/Fighter	Notes
24/25 October	Ramsgate	17/–	3 BR.20M lost, 1 damaged, 1 crew killed
27 October	Ramsgate	15/73	Attack cancelled
29 October	Ramsgate	15/−	1 BR.20 shot down, crew wounded
5 November	Ipswich, Harwich	8/−	1 BR.20M damaged
9 November	Ramsgate	5/−	Cancelled, bad weather
11 November	Harwich, London	15/40	10 BR.20M, 5 Cant Z.1007, 3 BR.20M shot down, 3 damaged, two fighters shot down by defences; 10 fighters slightly damaged by forced landings; pilots claimed at least nine British fighters
17/18 November	Harwich	6/–	
20/21 November	Harwich, Ipswich	12/–	
29/30 November	Ipswich, Lowestoft, Great Yarmouth	9/–	
14/15 December	Harwich	11/–	
21/22 December (night)	Harwich	6/–	
22 December	Harwich	4/–	
2/3 January	Ipswich	5/–	
Totals	102	113	Bomb tonnages: Day, 9.4; Night 44.9

== See also ==
- Military history of Italy during World War II
- RAF Fighter Command

== Bibliography ==
- Collier, B. (2004) [1957]. Butler, J. R. M. (ed.). The Defence of the United Kingdom. History of the Second World War United Kingdom Military Series (facs. pbk. repr. Naval & Military Press, Uckfield ed.). London: HMSO. ISBN 978-1-845-74055-9 – via Archive Foundation.
- De Decker, Cyrnik (November 1998). "Faisceaux italienes sur la Manche: Le Corpo Aero Italiano (CAI) en 1940/1941" [Italian Fasces on the English Channel: The Italian Air Corps in 1940–1941]. Avions: Toute l'aéronautique et son histoire (in French) (80): 5–19. ISSN 1243-8650.
- Guglielmetti, Luca; Rebora, Andrea (2014). La Regia Aeronautica nella Battaglia d'Inghilterra [The Royal Air Force in the Battle of Britain] (in Italian). Roma: Aeronautica Militare - Ufficio Storico. ISBN 978-88-98234-08-0.
- Gunston, Bill (2001), The Illustrated Directory of Fighting Aircraft of World War II, Salamander, ISBN 1-84065-092-3
- Haining, Peter (2005). The Chianti Raiders The Extraordinary Story of the Italian Air Force in the Battle of Britain. London: Robson. ISBN 1-86105-829-2.
- Hough, Richard, and Richards, Denis, The Battle of Britain, W.W. Norton Company, New York and London, 1989, ISBN 0-393-02766-X
- Mondey, David (1984), The Concise Guide to Axis Aircraft of World War II, Chancellor Press, ISBN 1-85152-966-7
- Neulen, Hans Werner (2005) [2000]. In the Skies of Europe: Air Forces Allied to the Luftwaffe 1939–1945. Translated by Vanags-Baginskis, Alex (pbk. repr. ed.). Ramsbury, Marlborough: The Crowood Press. ISBN 1-86-126799-1.
- Ramsey, Winston C. (1988). The Blitz. Battle of Britain Prints International Limited. ISBN 0900913541.
- Townshend Bickers, Richard (1990). The Battle of Britain. Salamander. ISBN 0-86101-477-4.
