= Patriot's Certificate =

Document given to the Italian resistance fighters during WWII

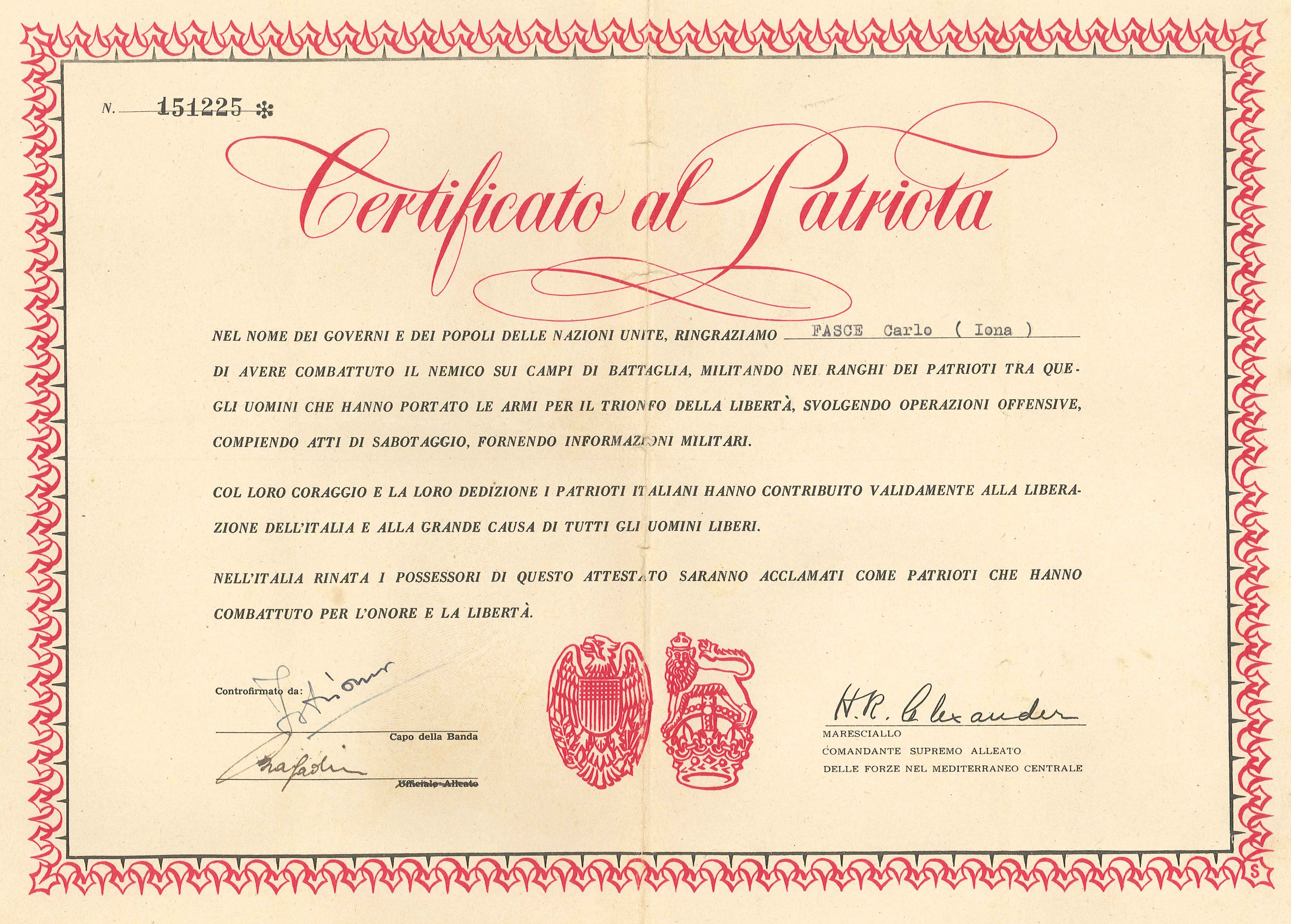
The Patriot's Certificate given to the Italian partisans

The Patriot's Certificate (Italian: Certificato al Patriota) is a document that was given to the partisans of the Italian resistance movement during and after the Second World War, signed by the British field marshal Harold Alexander, commander of Allied forces in Italy, attesting to their active collaboration with the Allied forces against the Axis forces.

One of first of them was awarded to Nello Iacchini who, on August 26, 1944, saved the life of the Marshal himself and the British Prime Minister Winston Churchill during a visit to Italy.

Among those who received the certificate are Raffaele Cadorna Jr., a World War I veteran who commanded Italian resistance forces against Wehrmacht forces in northern Italy during World War II.

== The text (translated into English) ==
In the name of the governments and peoples of the United Nations, we thank [NAME AND PSEUDONYM] for having fought the enemy in the battle fields on service in the patriot ranks, among these men, who have use the arms for the triumph of liberty, developing offensive operations, doing acts of sabotage, giving military information.

With their courage, and their pluck, the Italian Patriots have greatly contributed to the liberation of Italy and the great cause of all free men.

In the re-born Italy, the owners of this certificate will be considered as patriots, who have fought for the honour and for the Liberty.

[signed] H.R. Alexander
Field-Marshal
Supreme Allied Commander, Mediterranean Theatre
