= Renato Sandalli =

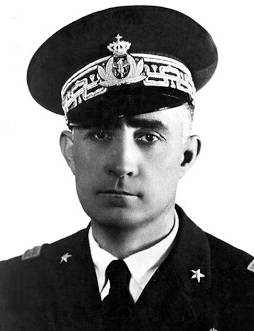

Chief of Staff of the Regia Aeronautica
- In office 27 July 1943 – 18 June 1944
- Preceded by: Rino Corso Fougier
- Succeeded by: Pietro Piacentini

Personal details
- Born: 25 February 1897 Genoa, Kingdom of Italy
- Died: 23 October 1968 (aged 71) Rome, Italy

Military service
- Allegiance: Kingdom of Italy
- Branch/service: Regia Aeronautica
- Years of service: 1916–1955
- Rank: General
- Commands: Chief of Staff of the Royal Italian Air Force

Renato Sandalli (25 February 1897 – 23 October 1968) was an Italian Air Force general that led the Regia Aeronautica between 27 July 1943 to 18 June 1944.

== Life and career ==
Born in Genoa, Sandalli joined the Regio Esercito in the February 1916 and fought as Army officer for the entire World War I. In the early years of the 1920s he became a pilot and after the establishment of the Regia Aeronatica he left the army to become an air force officer. In the years between the two world wars he also led various units posted in Italy and in the colonies. From January 1939 he led the Experimental Flight Center then was named commander of all Regia Aeronautica forces in the Italian occupied Albania. In July 1943 when Mussolini was ousted he was a general with duties in the Air Force general staff in Rome, he was named by the king Minister of the Air Force and chief of the staff of the air force. After the Armistice, he escaped in Brindisi together with the king. In June 1944, when Badoglio resigned from his post as prime minister he left his duties as minister and chief of staff. After the war he remained in the air force with other duties. He died in Rome in 1968.

Military offices
Preceded by Rino Corso Fougier	Chief of Staff of the Royal Italian Air Force; 27 July 1943 – 18 June 1944	Succeeded by Pietro Piacentini
