= Vincenzo Camporini =

Italian general and politician (born 1946)

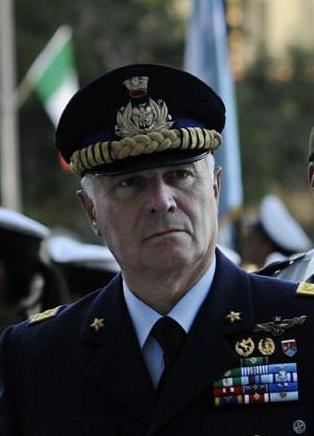
- Born: 21 June 1946 (age 80); Como, Italy
- Military career
- Allegiance: Italy
- Branch: Italian Air Force
- Service years: 1965–2011
- Rank: General
- Commands: Italian Air Command
- Awards: Long Navigation Medal, Grand Officer of the Order of Merit of the Italian Republic, Commandeur of the Order of Merit of the French Republic, Santos Dumont Medal of Merit of the Republic of Brazil, the Italian Defence General Staff Decoration of Honour, and the Paul Tissandier Diploma

Vincenzo Camporini, KGC (born 21 June 1946), is an Italian general and politician. He was the Chief of the Defence General Staff in Italy from 12 February 2008 until 2011. He became chief of staff of the Italian Air Force on 20 September 2006. Camporini has over 2,500 hours' flying time in over twenty different aircraft types, including helicopters. General Camporini is qualified in Aeronautical Sciences and International and Diplomatic Sciences. He is a Fellow of the Royal Aeronautical Society.

== Military career ==
He was in the Accademia Aeronautica in 1965, where he later graduated in 1969. During his time as a lieutenant colonel he served as an F-104 RECCE pilot with the 3rd Wing in Villafranca di Verona, during which he commanded the 28th Squadron right after his graduation at the NATO Defence College in 1977 with the rank of lieutenant colonel. After graduating at the ITAF Air War College in 1982, he served as staff officer at the Personnel Division of the Air Staff.

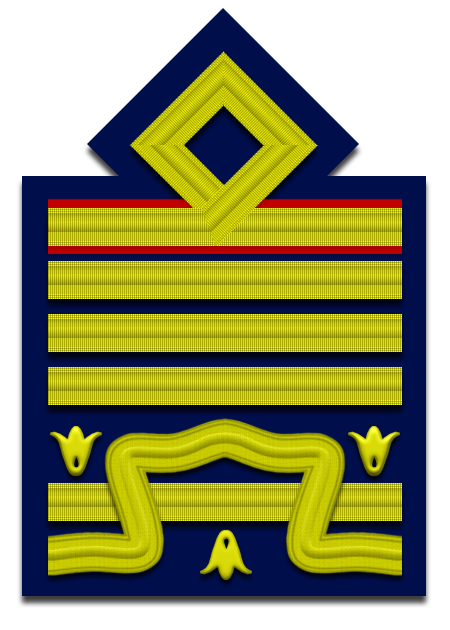
The air force rank insignia for a general

Between 1983 and 1985 he was the aide-de-camp to the chief of staff. With the rank of colonel, which he earned in 1985, he served in the Weapon Systems Research and Development Office. In 1988 Camporini commanded the Air Force Flight Test Centre and represented Italy to the Aerospace Application Study Committee of AGARD. In the Air Force General Staff he served as the chief of the New Weapon Systems Technical Development, including EFA, and was the Italian Representative in the NAEW program. During his time at the rank of brigadier general, starting from 1993, he directed the Plans, Operations and Training Division and in April 1996 he was given the title of Inspector of the Aviation for the Navy. As a major general, he has been appointed as inspector for flight safety and chief of the 3rd Division of the Defence General Staff Military Policy, International Affairs, Armament Control and Civil Defence. On 20 April 2001, with the rank of lieutenant general, took up the position of deputy chief of Defence General Staff until 29 February 2004, when he was designated as president of the Italian Centre for High Defence Studies.

== Chief of staff ==
Camporini began holding office as a general in the chief of staff of the Italian Air Force on 20 September 2006. He is now a command pilot with experience in over twenty different aircraft including F-104, Tornado, AMX, heavy transport aircraft and helicopters. As of December 2003 he had flown around 2500 hours. On 12 February 2008, General Camporini was appointed to chief of Defence General Staff. After retirement in January 2011, he has been elected vice president of the Istituto Affari Internazionali (IAI), the most prominent Italian think tank for foreign policy and strategy.

=== DNMG conference ===
==== Air Force objective ====
In a Defense News Media Group conference, "Camporini: Create Interoperability Through Modeling and Simulation" Camporini said that the objective for the Air Force is to develop an infrastructure that could support decision-makers in the procurement phase and operational sites in the employment of new systems and technologies to be used for training purposes and for operational reasons.

==== Modeling and simulation ====
Camporini wishes to acquire modeling and simulation gear in four areas: air and ballistic missile defense; operational planning, tasking and evaluation; operational training and mission practice in distributed environments; and coalition operations and crisis response. Camporini's opinion of the modeling and simulation department's vision is that the key concept in the Air Force modeling and simulation is a joint synthetic battle space connecting analysis and training, as well as tying together many types of models and simulations with different kinds of operators. Camporini says that he believes the simulations extend from high-level aggregate models to detailed engineering models, from pilots in live aircraft and simulators to hardware components and laboratory test beds.

=== OSCE seminar ===
==== Ministry of defence ====
Camporini believes that in the future the ministry of defence needs to rewrite their military doctrines, taking into account the redistribution of responsibility imposed by the new technology and conversely they have to take the greatest care in nurturing the maturity and the cultural level of the troops, throughout the education that is provided. he has stated that he wonders whether the Organization for Security and Co-operation in Europe (OSCE) is not in the position to take any initiative in the field of education of military personnel, or to make everybody aware of the specifics related to the operations peculiar to its mission.

==== Jobs and challenges ====
Camporini states that he is fully convinced that the greatest challenge is not technology in itself, is not security and integrity of data, is not the decluttering of information, but the quantum leap in culture required at all echelons. Generals must learn to do and stick to their job of strategists and planners, leaving tactics where they belong; platoon commanders must learn to take their own growing share of responsibility to conduct actions that concur with the intent indicated by generals, without minute by minute directions.

== Honours and awards ==
His awards and decorations include Gold Medal for Flying Merit, Command Gold Medal, Gold Cross for Military Service, Italian Defence General Staff Medal of Honour, Commandeur of the Order of Merit of the French Republic, Santos Dumont Medal to the Merit of the Republic of Brazil, and the Paul Tissandier Diploma awarded by the Fédération Aéronautique Internationale. He received the Knight of the Grand Cross of the Order of Merit of the Italian Republic

== Personal life ==
Camporini earned University degrees in Aeronautical Sciences and International and Diplomatic Sciences. He is a Fellow of the Royal Aeronautical Society. He is member of the Italy–USA Foundation. He was married to the late Silvana Alemanno, with whom he has a daughter and two grandchildren. He is now married with Paola Tarantini.

Military offices
Preceded by Leonardo Tricarico	Chief of Staff of the Italian Air Force; 2006–2008	Succeeded by Daniele Tei
Preceded by Giampaolo Di Paola	Chief of the Defence General Staff; 2008–2011	Succeeded by Biagio Abrate
