= Rino Corso Fougier =

General of the Italian Air Force

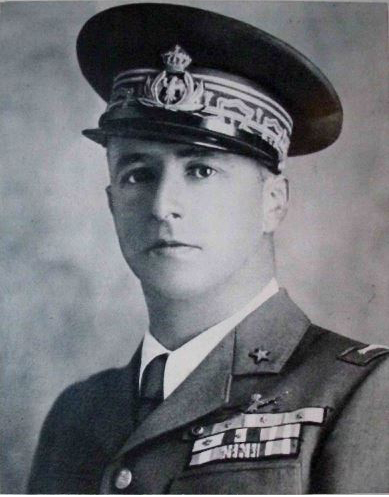

Chief of Staff of the Regia Aeronautica
- In office 15 November 1941 – 27 July 1943
- Preceded by: Francesco Pricolo
- Succeeded by: Renato Sandalli

Personal details
- Born: 14 November 1894 Bastia, France
- Died: 24 April 1963 (aged 68) Rome, Italy

Military service
- Allegiance: Kingdom of Italy
- Branch/service: Royal Italian Army; Regia Aeronautica
- Rank: Generale di divisione aerea
- Commands: 70th Fighter Squadron; 5th Defence Sector of Padua; Corps of Staff of the Air Force; III Air Brigade; Corpo Aereo Italiano; Air Force Chief of Staff
- Battles/wars: World War I; Spanish Civil War; Second Italo-Ethiopian War; World War II

Rino Corso Fougier (14 November 1894 – 24 April 1963) was a general of the Italian Royal Air Force. From 1940 to 1941 he served as the commander of the Corpo Aereo Italiano which, in concert with the Luftwaffe, took part in the Battle of Britain. From 1941 to 1943 he commanded the Regia Aeronautica. He was awarded the German Cross in Gold in January 1943.

== Military career ==
On 31 December 1912 he enlisted in the Royal Army and participated in the course for additional officer student. He was appointed second lieutenant of the Infantry in 1914 and was entrusted with the command of a platoon of cyclist Bersaglieri.

He participated in the First World War with the 7th Bersaglieri Regiment. On June 23, 1915, he was wounded by a mine during a reconnaissance mission to the quarries northwest of Seltz, but he continued to serve. For this act of heroism, he was awarded the Silver Medal of Military Valor.

On 29 June 1916, he went to the Aviator Schools Battalion as an aspiring pilot student: in Venaria Reale on Blériot and in Cascina Costa on SAML/Aviatik BI and S. 200, obtaining a pilot's license on 26 October and that of military pilot on 4 February 1917. Assigned to the 113th Squadron, he participated in several fights. In April, Lieutenant Fougier commanded the 1st Section of SAML S.1 in Feltre. On May 20, 1917, he engaged in aerial combat with three Austrian fighters, including the Hansa-Brandenburg D.I of the Godwin Brumowski flying ace claiming the eighth victory, in collaboration with the ace Károly Kaszala (8 wins), over the Banjšice Plateau, with the plane out of order he was wounded twice and received another silver medal.

From 2 December 1917 he commanded the 70th Fighter Squadron, flying the Hanriot HD.1, until January 1918. On 12 January, he commanded the 5th Defense Section of Padua, flying the Nieuport 27, until March. In March, he flew with the 83rd Marcon Squadron. On 18 March he went with the 1st Section to the San Pietro in Gu airfield and on March 22 he commanded the squadron on Nieuport 27; on 23 August he received promotion to captain of the Bersaglieri. On 14 September Fougier with Sergeant Adamo Bortolini, soldier Romeo Sartori and Lieutenant Enrico Rizzi shot down a hunting Albatros on Arsiè. On 16 September, Fougier claimed a small two-seater in Val di Nos di Gallio and on 4 October the department moved to Poianella di Bressanvido.

From April 1919 he was with the 87th Airplane Squadron. He received a third silver medal. On 10 April 1921, he moved to the Air Force, going to the 3rd Air Force Grouping as squadron leader. In 1923, he was in command of the 83rd Serenissima Squadron.

On October 16, 1923, he moved to the Corps of Staff of the Regia Aeronautica as a captain of the Air Force, a fighting role as Chief of Staff of the 2nd Territorial Air Zone (ZAT) until 1 June 1928. In 1925 he was promoted to major and in 1927 to lieutenant colonel. From 1 June 1928 to 1 June 1933, he commanded the 1st Stormo Caccia Terrestre, receiving the praise of Italo Balbo. In 1930 in Campoformido, he founded the first aerobatic flight school with the Fiat C.R.20, where the Frecce Tricolori would soon be born.

On 9 April 1931, he was promoted to colonel. From June 1933 to March 1934 he commanded the III Air Brigade. From 1 July 1935 to 16 December 1937, he commanded the air force of Libya at the request of the commander of Libya, Balbo. On 17 February 1936, he became an Air Division general. During the Second Italo-Ethiopian War, he was in command of the air force in Italian East Africa. Then he participated in the Spanish Civil War. Between 29 December 1937 and 1 August 1938, he was inspector of schools and then commander of the 3rd Territorial Air Zone (ZAT) until 1 September 1939. On 14 April 1939 he became an air squad general and commanded the 3rd Air Squad from 1 September and from 15 May 1940 the 1st Air Squad until 15 June 1941.

Between 10 September 1940 and 28 January 1941 he participated in the Battle of Britain in command of the Italian Air Corps in Belgium. After Benito Mussolini's decision to dismiss General Francesco Pricolo, from 15 November 1941 to 27 July 1943 he held the position of Undersecretary of State for the Air Force and Chief of Staff of the Air Force. He was finally promoted to general in the air force on October 28, 1942. After the fall of fascism, on 27 July 1943, he was removed from office and retired to private life.

He died on 24 April 1963.

Military offices
Preceded by Francesco Pricolo	Chief of Staff of the Royal Italian Air Force; 15 November 1941 – 27 July 1943	Succeeded by Renato Sandalli
