= Eugenio Henke =

Italian admiral

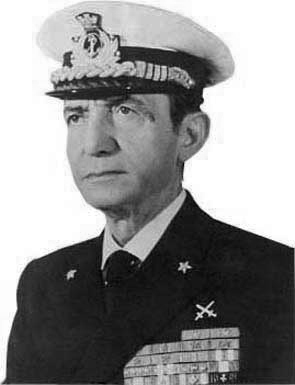

Chief of Defense Staff
- In office 1 August 1972 – 31 January 1975
- Preceded by: L.General Enzo Marchesi
- Succeeded by: L. General Andrea Viglione

Servizio Informazioni Difesa(SID)
- In office 1 July 1966 – 18 October 1970
- Preceded by: established
- Succeeded by: Vito Miceli

Personal details
- Born: 15 November 1909 Genoa, Italy
- Died: 4 February 1990 (aged 80) Rome, Italy
- Cause of death: heart attack

Military service
- Allegiance: Italy
- Branch/service: Italian Navy

Eugenio Henke (1909-1990) was an admiral of the Italian Armed forces who served as the director of the Defense Information Service (SID) from July 1966 to October 1970. He became the Chief of Defense Staff from August 1972 to January 1975; he was the first naval officer to hold the position in Italy.

Eugenio Henke, an admiral of the Italian Royal Navy, was born 15 November 1909 in Genoa, Italy; he enrolled in the Royal Naval Academy Livorno in ordinary courses and graduated in 1931. He became lieutenant during the outbreak of Second World War and was the deputy in command of the Vincenzo Gioberti destroyer until 1941. Eugenio Henke had participated in over 40 wars and missions, 16 convoys escort missions, in inclusion was the battle of Capo Matapan, the Punta Stilo and the Capo Teulada.

== Commands and ranks ==
He was the commander of Escort Torpedo boat Orsa during his promotion to lieutenant captain, in March 1942, at La Spezia he was in command of VAS 235, in 1943.

=== German troops in La Spezia ===
During the German troops in La Spezia, was between September 1943, he was persuaded to leave the La Spezia port with the VAS 234, although the German troops were sent to occupy the Italian by surprise. The VAS 234 was under command of Rear Admiral Federico Martinengo. The German troops opened fire during the furious clash; the VAS 234 was hit and exploded; Eugenio Henke managed to escape with the other crew on it.

He was the commander of Sant'Alfonso a submarine fighter which was in November 1943, he headed the superior torpedo command under it training service until 1947 of which he rose up to be the deputy Chief of Staff of the Navy, he later became the frigate captain in January 1948 until when he was made the commander of the 1st Corvette Squadron school of the Naval command Rome in December 1951.

He was moved to the Ministry of Defence in 1953 until a promotion to captain of vessel in 1954, he rose to become the deputy chief of Navy and served as the head of general secretary of the Navy together as commander of the navy of Rome. He was promoted to rear admiral in 1960 and was commander of 4th Italian naval division in December 1964 before he rose to be the head of Defence Information Service at the rank of vice admiral in 1965, that experience great strategy of tension and massacre, although he already became an admiral since January 1968.

As the director of SID, he was involved in conducting Investigation of the incident but denied all it after the Ministry of the Interior in 1970 reported that it was from the SID that had reported a certain in Guerin Serac, in that 1970 during October he left the office of and moved on to command the Central Mediterranean of NATO and at same time Vice President of the Marine Section of the Superior Council of the Armed Forces, he was also a Commander-in-Chief of the Naval Squad was between 1970 until when he was made the Chief of Staff of Defence in August 1972 by the Council of Ministers, he left the office on 31 January 1975.

== Coup and testimony ==
He was called by the judiciary department to testify some investigation which although he was involved, the one of Borghese coup and oil scandal during 1974, other was the one of which have to do with murder of a journalist Mino Pecorelli. He was later tried for helping to hide the truth of the intelligence plane that crashed in Marghera in 1973, the trial happened in 1989.

== Death ==
He died in Rome at the Celio military hospital on February 4, 1990.

== Awards ==
- Bronze Medals for Military Valor.

Military offices
Preceded by Enzo Marchesi	Chief of Defense Staff; 1972–1975	Succeeded by Andrea Viglione
Preceded by established	Defense Information Service; 1966–1972	Succeeded by Vito Miceli
