= Daniele Tei =

Italian Air Force general

Chief of Staff of the Italian Air Force
- In office 30 January 2008 – 25 February 2010
- Preceded by: Vincenzo Camporini
- Succeeded by: Giuseppe Bernardis

Personal details
- Born: 30 June 1946
- Died: 17 September 2011 (aged 65) Trevignano Romano

Daniele Tei (30 June 1946 – 17 September 2011) was an Italian Air Force general. He served as Chief of Staff of the Italian Air Force from 30 January 2008 to 25 February 2010.

Military offices
Preceded by Vincenzo Camporini	Chief of Staff of the Italian Air Force; 2008–2010	Succeeded by Giuseppe Bernardis
