= Sandro Ferracuti =

Italian Air Force general

Chief of Staff of the Italian Air Force
- In office 3 August 2001 – 4 August 2004
- Preceded by: Andrea Fornasiero
- Succeeded by: Leonardo Tricarico

Personal details
- Born: 8 May 1940 (age 85)

Sandro Ferracuti (born 8 May 1940) is a former Italian Air Force general. He served as Chief of Staff of the Italian Air Force from 3 August 2001 to 4 August 2004.

Military offices
Preceded by Andrea Fornasiero	Chief of Staff of the Italian Air Force; 2001–2004	Succeeded by Leonardo Tricarico
