= Giuseppe Bernardis =

Italian Air Force general

Chief of Staff of the Italian Air Force
- In office 25 February 2010 – 25 February 2013
- Preceded by: Daniele Tei
- Succeeded by: Pasquale Preziosa

Personal details
- Born: 5 January 1948 (age 78)

Giuseppe Bernardis (born 5 January 1948) is a retired Italian Air Force general. He served as Chief of Staff of the Italian Air Force from 25 February 2010 to 25 February 2013. Pasquale Preziosa was appointed as his successor.

== Honour ==
- Italy: Knight Grand Cross of the Order of Merit of the Italian Republic (24 February 2010)

Military offices
| Preceded by Daniele Tei | Chief of Staff of the Italian Air Force; 2010–2013 | Succeeded by Pasquale Preziosa |
