= Leonardo Tricarico =

Italian Air Force general

Chief of Staff of the Italian Air Force
- In office 5 August 2004 – 19 September 2006
- Preceded by: Sandro Ferracuti
- Succeeded by: Vincenzo Camporini

Personal details
- Born: 9 September 1942 (age 83)

Leonardo Tricarico (born 9 September 1942) is a former Italian Air Force general. He served as Chief of Staff of the Italian Air Force from 5 August 2004 to 19 September 2006. Vincenzo Camporini was appointed as his successor.

Military offices
Preceded by Sandro Ferracuti	Chief of Staff of the Italian Air Force; 2004–2006	Succeeded by Vincenzo Camporini
