= Mario Ajmone Cat =

Italian Air Force general during World War II

- Born: 5 February 1894; Salerno, Kingdom of Italy
- Died: 20 March 1952 (aged 58); Rome, Italy
- Military career
- Allegiance: Kingdom of Italy; Italy
- Branch: Regia Aeronautica; Italian Air Force
- Rank: Air Fleet General
- Commands: 33rd Farman Squadron; 111th SAML Squadron; XXI Airplane Group; Air Observation School; 2nd Wing; 7th Night Bombardment Wing; Air Warfare School; Air Force of Eritrea; Italian East Africa Air Force Command; 4th Territorial Air Zone; 3rd Air Fleet; 5th Air Force; General Command of Air Force Military Schools; Air Force Chief of Staff
- Conflicts: World War I; Italian Front; Macedonian front; Second Italo-Ethiopian War; World War II; North African campaign
- Awards: Silver Medal of Military Valor (five times); War Merit Cross; Military Order of Savoy; Order of the Crown of Italy; Order of Saints Maurice and Lazarus; Colonial Order of the Star of Italy; Legion of Honour; Croix de guerre 1914-1918; Iron Cross First Class; Order of St. Olav; Order of St. Sava

Mario Ajmone Cat (Salerno, 5 February 1894 – Rome, 20 March 1952) was an Italian Air Force general during World War II. He was Chief of Staff of the Italian Air Force from 1944 to 1951.

== Biography ==
He was born in Salerno on February 5, 1894, the son of Ferdinando Ajmone Cat, a Bersaglieri officer, and Maria Domenica Sparano. In 1907 he entered the Military School of Rome, and in 1911 he entered the Royal Military Academy of Artillery and Engineers in Turin. In February 1913 he graduated as artillery second lieutenant, subsequently passing to the Turin Artillery and Engineer Application School. After completing his studies he was assigned to the 9th Field Artillery Regiment, stationed near Pavia. In March 1915 he requested to attend the aircraft observer course held at the School of Nettuno, obtaining the brevet on May 23, 1915, the day before Italy's entry into World War I. On September 13, with the rank of lieutenant, he was assigned to the 10th Farman Reconnaissance and Fighter Squadron, attached to the 3rd Army of General Emanuele Filiberto of Savoy-Aosta. On 12 October he entered service with the 6th Farman reconnaissance and fighter squadron, and on 14 February 1916 he and Sergeant Antonio Locatelli, flying on a Farman 14 with a 100 HP Fiat A.10 engine, shot down an enemy aircraft. On April 15, the squadron was renamed 30th Farman Squadron, assigned to the 2nd Army, serving in that unit until May, when Ajmone Cat was promoted to captain and assigned first to the Aviator Squadron Battalion and then, from early July, to the 5th Squadron.

Between August and October 1916 he attended a pilot course at the Mirafiori airfield near Turin, obtaining the pilot's license on October 16 and that of Aviatik pilot on January 16, 1917. Initially assigned to the 72nd Aviatik Squadron (later 72nd Fighter Squadron) in Brescia, on 10 April he assumed command of the 33rd Farman Squadron (later 33rd Savoia-Pomilio SP.2 and Savoia-Pomilio SP.3 Squadron), and on its dissolution, from 5 May he was in command of the 111th SAML Squadron of Campoformido until 31 July, when the squadron was transferred to Taliedo to be assigned to the Italian Expeditionary Force in Macedonia, which left on 13 September for Taranto, reaching its destination in October. At the head of this squadron he participated in the Macedonian campaign, later becoming interim commander of the XXI Airplane Group formed in Thessaloniki on May 25, 1918.

After the war he joined the 3rd Reconnaissance Aircraft Group until October 16, 1923, when he left the Army and joined the newly established Regia Aeronautica, assigned to the 19th Reconnaissance Wing. In November 1926 he was promoted to the rank of lieutenant colonel, taking command of the Air Observation School from July 1927. He held this role until October 1929, when he was promoted to the rank of colonel, taking command of the 2nd Wing, and then receiving that of the General Directorate of Services, Materials and Airports, a role he covered until March 19, 1931. In the same month he became commander of the 7th Night Bombardment Wing, holding this position until October 15, 1932, the day when he assumed the functions of deputy Chief of Staff of the 3rd Territorial Air Zone (ZAT) based in Rome-Centocelle. He held this position until 1 March 1934, and on 1 November of the same year he assumed command of the Air Warfare School in Florence, holding this position for various periods until 15 February 1940.

He participated in the Rome-London-Berlin-Rome, in Italo Balbo’s Eastern Mediterranean Seaplane Cruise (June 1929), and in the Day of Wing, an air show held on 27 May 1932. On March 21, 1935, he was promoted to the rank of Air Brigade General (equivalent to air commodore), and given command of the Air Force of Eritrea. Between 5 September 1935 and 14 August 1936 he participated in the Second Italo-Ethiopian War, as commander of the Italian East Africa Air Force Command. During the campaign he was promoted to general of air division (equivalent to air vice marshal) "for extraordinary merits" in February 1936. In August 1936 he returned to the command of the Air War School, which he left on November 19, 1936, to become commander of the 4th Territorial Air Zone of Bari. While serving in this position, he was promoted to the rank of air fleet general (equivalent to air marshal) on April 14, 1939. On 16 May 1939 he returned to the command of the Air War School.

After Italy entered the Second World War on 10 June 1940, on the 28th of the same month he assumed command of the 3rd Air Fleet. In February 1941 he assumed command of the 5th Air Force in Libya. Here he came into conflict with both the German General Staff and the Italian Army command, and on 6 November he was relieved of his post and assigned to the General Command of the Air Force Military Schools. After the Armistice of Cassibile he was ordered by the Chief of Staff of the Air Force Ministry to dissolve his command, which he did by destroying all personnel lists and secret documents. He was placed on unlimited leave, remaining in Rome during the period of the Nazi occupation. He was repeatedly asked to join the Aeronautica Nazionale Repubblicana, even with threats, but always refused.

After the liberation of the capital, on 13 November 1944, he was subjected to an "epuration" procedure but acquitted of all charges, and on 13 December 1944 he was appointed Chief of Staff of the Air Force, a post he held even after the end of the war and the establishment of the Italian Republic, until 5 February 1951. He died in Rome on March 20, 1952.

He was married to Countess Carla Angela Durini of Monza, the first woman to cross equatorial Africa on mechanized vehicles (from the Red Sea to Lobito) in 1930–1931. His son Giovanni Ajmone Cat was an Antarctic explorer.

Military offices
Preceded by Pietro Piacentini	Chief of Staff of the Italian Air Force; 13 December 1944 – 5 February 1951	Succeeded by Aldo Urbani
