= Fast Army Corps (Italy) =

Royal Italian Army army corps during World War II

The Fast Army Corps or Cavalry Army Corps (Italian: Corpo d'Armata Celere) was a Royal Italian Army army corps during World War II that participated in the invasion of Yugoslavia.

== History ==
The Fast or Rapid Army Corps Command was formed on 10 November 1938 in Padua, where it remained stationed until 1941.

On 6 April 1941, the Corps was added to the 2nd Army and took part in operations against Yugoslavia. On 13 April, it entered Yugoslav territory, reaching Bacce, Karlovac, Duga Resa and Ogulin. After the end of the conflict, the units of the Army Corps remained in central-northern Croatia as an occupation force.
On 15 July 1941, the Corps returned to the national territory. By 28 September, all 3 of its Fast Divisions had been replaced and transferred to other units. On 15 November, the Command was moved to form the Special Army Corps Command, which was to operate on the Greek-Albanian front. By that time, the Fast Army Corps had lost all characteristics of Fast Corps, except for its name. What remained of the Corps stayed near Padua until 10 May 1942, when it was absorbed by the XXII Army Corps.

== Composition (Yugoslavia) ==
- 1st Cavalry Division "Eugenio di Savoia"
- 2nd Cavalry Division "Emanuele Filiberto Testa di Ferro"
- 3rd Cavalry Division "Principe Amedeo Duca d'Aosta"

== Commanders ==
- Claudio Trezzani (11 November 1938 – 5 May 1940)
- Angelo Pivano (interim)
- Giovanni Messe (16 May 1940 – 15 November 1940)
- Federico Ferrari Orsi (15 November 1940 – 10 May 1942)
