= Pasquale Preziosa =

Italian Air Force officer

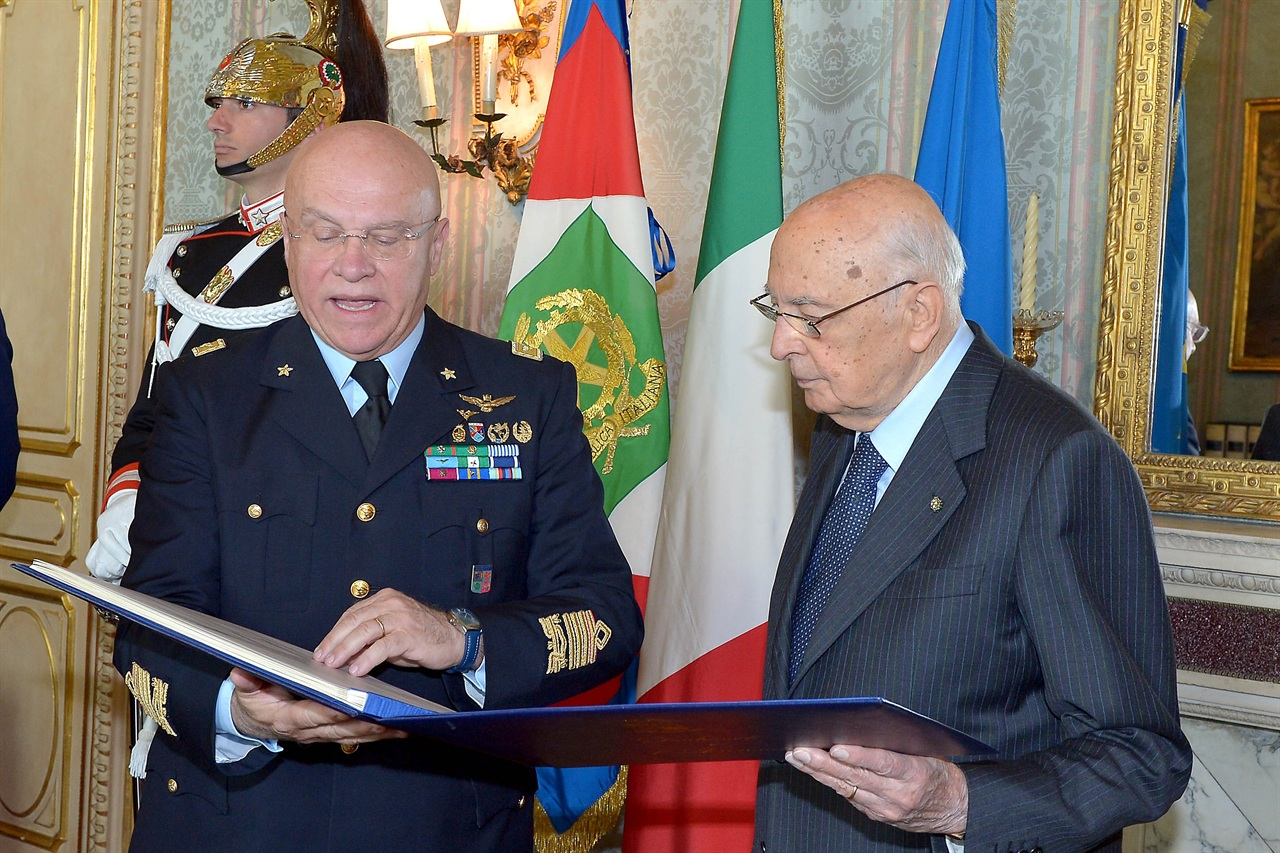
- Born: 21 March 1953 (age 73); Bisceglie, Italy
- Military career
- Allegiance: Italy
- Branch: Italian Air Force
- Service years: 1971–2016
- Rank: Lieutenant General
- Commands: Chief of the Italian Air Force
- Awards: Knight Grand Cross of the Order of Merit of the Italian Republic

Lieutenant General Pasquale Preziosa (born 21 March 1953) is a retired Italian Air Force officer, who served as Chief of the Italian Air Force.

He joined the Air Force in 1971 and qualified as a pilot.

From August 2003 to September 2006 he served as the Defense Attaché at the Embassy of Italy, Washington, D.C., and Chief of the Cabinet of the Minister of Defence from December 2011 to February 2013. He was appointed Chief of the Air Force in 2013.

Military offices
Preceded by Giuseppe Bernardis	Chief of the Italian Air Force; 2013–2016	Succeeded by Enzo Vecciarelli
