= Claudio Trezzani =

Italian general during World War II

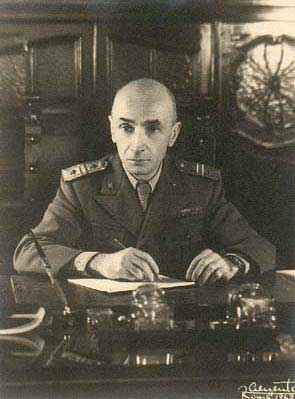

Chief of the Italian General Staff
- In office 1 May 1945 – 31 May 1945
- Preceded by: Giovanni Messe
- Succeeded by: Office abolished

Personal details
- Born: 22 March 1881 Savigliano, Kingdom of Italy
- Died: 13 September 1955 (aged 74) Rome, Italy
- Awards: Silver Medal of Military Valour; Military Order of Savoy; Order of Saints Maurice and Lazarus; Order of Merit of the Italian Republic

Military service
- Allegiance: Kingdom of Italy; Italy
- Branch/service: Royal Italian Army; Italian Army
- Years of service: 1903–1950
- Rank: General
- Commands: 90th Infantry Regiment; 2nd Cavalry Division Emanuele Filiberto Testa di Ferro; Padua Army Corps; Chief of General Staff; Chief of Defense Staff
- Battles/wars: Italo-Turkish War; World War I; Battle of Caporetto; Battle of Vittorio Veneto; World War II; East African campaign; Battle of Amba Alagi

Claudio Trezzani (Savigliano, 22 March 1881 – Rome, 13 September 1955) was an Italian general during World War II, Chief of Staff of the Armed Forces of Italian East Africa. After the war he became the last Chief of General Staff of the Kingdom of Italy and the first Chief of the Defence Staff of the Italian Republic.

== Biography ==
Trezzani was born in Savigliano, Piedmont, and joined the Royal Italian Army in his youth, enlisting in the Alpini corps. He participated in the Italo-Turkish War and in the First World War, serving as a staff officer in the later part of the war and earning a Silver Medal of Military Valour and a Knight's Cross of the Military Order of Savoy for his behaviour during the retreat that followed the battle of Caporetto and for his role in the battle of Vittorio Veneto.

After the end of the war he became a teacher at the Italian Army War School in Turin, and was later transferred to the Army Corps of Udine. In the early 1920s he commanded the 90th Infantry Regiment "Salerno". In 1937 he was then given command of the 2nd Cavalry Division Emanuele Filiberto Testa di Ferro and later that of the Army Corps of Padua.

In 1938 he was promoted to Lieutenant General for exceptional merits, and in the same year he was sent to Italian East Africa where he assumed the post of Chief of Staff of the armed forces in the colony, as well as serving as deputy governor under Pietro Badoglio. He was still serving in this capacity, now under the Duke of Aosta, when the Second World War broke out, and commanded Italian forces during the East African campaign. In May 1941, at the end of the siege of Amba Alagi, he surrendered to the British along with the Duke and Generals Luigi Frusci, Pietro Pinna Parpaglia and Marino Valletti-Borgnini. He was then sent to Great Britain as a prisoner of war, and later transferred to the United States, initially at Camp Crossville and later at Camp Monticello.

After the Armistice of Cassibile, Trezzani was released and attached to the headquarters of the Italian Service Units in Washington. In December 1944 he was repatriated and returned to active service in the Italian Co-belligerent Army. On 2 May 1945 he was appointed Chief of General Staff, a post he retained even after the establishment of the Italian Republic; from 1948 it was renamed Chief of Defense Staff. He held this position until 1950. Trezzani died in Rome in 1955, after a long illness.
