= Chief of the Defence Staff (Italy) =

Italian military officer

- Capo di stato maggiore della difesa
- Flag of the Chief of the Defence Staff

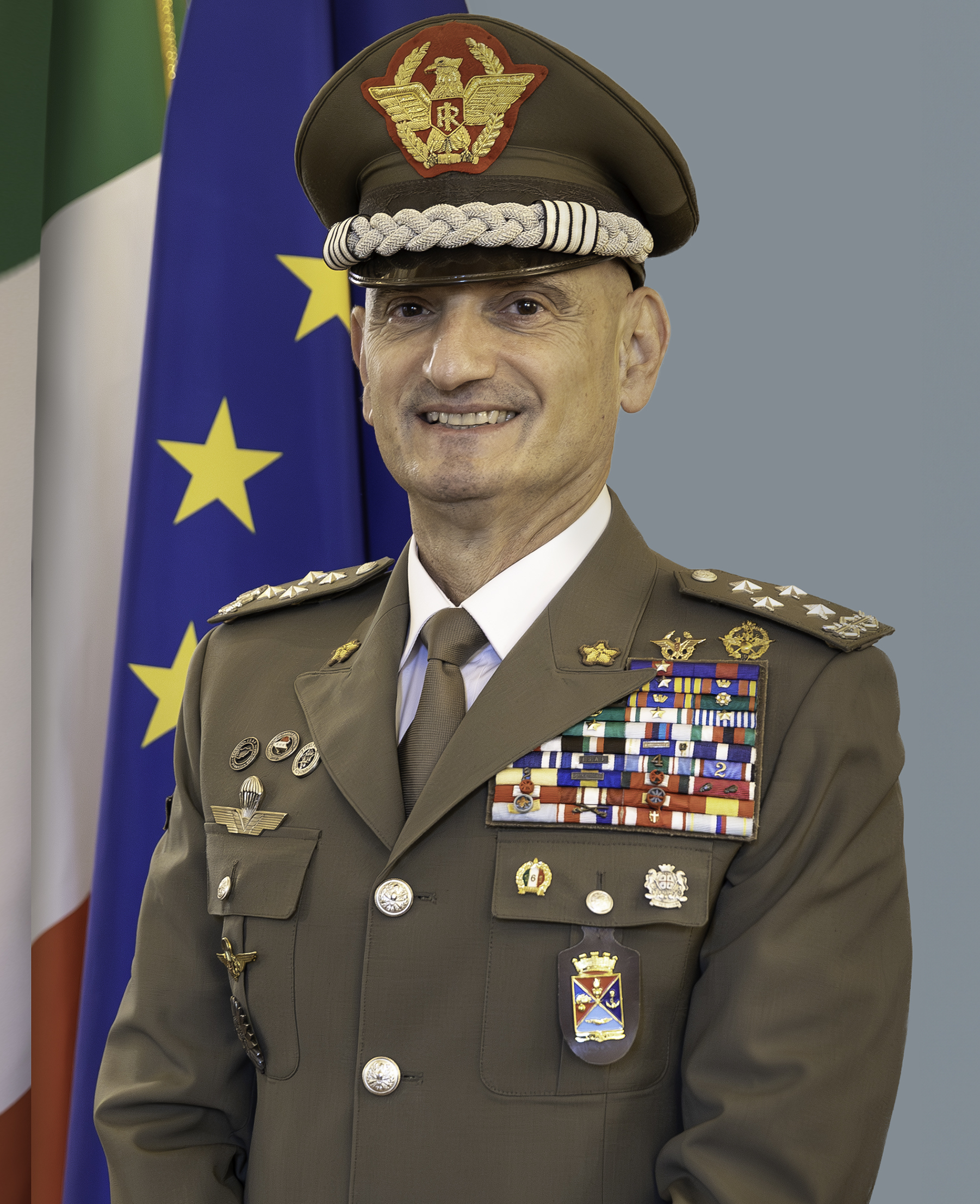
- Incumbent; General Luciano Portolano since 4 October 2024
- Ministry of Defence
- Reports to: Minister of Defence
- Nominator: Minister of Defence
- Appointer: President of Italy in consultation with the Council of Ministers
- Constituting instrument: Decree 66, articles 25, 26 & 27
- Formation: 4 May 1925
- First holder: Pietro Badoglio
- Website: Official website

The Chief of the Defence Staff of Italy is the service head of the Italian Armed Forces.

The current Chief of the Defence staff is General Luciano Portolano.

== History ==
The post was established in 1925 as Chief of the General Staff (Capo di Stato Maggiore Generale). From 1941 until 1945, it was Capo del Comando Supremo. In 1947 it assumed its present name.

The Chief of the Defense staff, since 1998, to exercise his duties, uses two joint bodies:

- Stato maggiore della Difesa (Defense Staff)
- Comando operativo di vertice interforze (Joint-top operational command)

== List of chiefs of the defence staff ==
=== Kingdom of Italy (1925–1946) ===
No.	Portrait	Chief of the General Staff	Took office	Left office	Time in office	Defence branch
1	Pietro Badoglio	Marshal of Italy; Pietro Badoglio (1871–1956) (Note: Resigned due to setbacks in the Greco-Italian War.)	4 May 1925	4 December 1940	15 years, 214 days	Royal Italian Army
2	Ugo Cavallero	Marshal of Italy; Ugo Cavallero (1880–1943) (Note: Dismissed due to setbacks in the North African campaign and on the Eastern Front.)	5 December 1940	1 February 1943	2 years, 58 days	Royal Italian Army
3	Vittorio Ambrosio	General; Vittorio Ambrosio (1879–1958) (Note: Served at the time of the fall of the Fascist regime and the Armistice of Cassibile.)	2 February 1943	18 November 1943	289 days	Royal Italian Army
4	Giovanni Messe	Marshal of Italy; Giovanni Messe (1883–1968) (Note: Chief of Staff of the Italian Co-belligerent Army.)	19 November 1943	1 May 1945	1 year, 163 days	Royal Italian Army

=== Italian Republic (1945−present) ===
No.	Portrait	Chief of the Defence Staff	Took office	Left office	Time in office	Defence branch
5	Claudio Trezzani	General; Claudio Trezzani (1881–1955)	2 May 1945	1 December 1950	5 years, 213 days	Italian Army
6	Luigi Efisio Marras	Lieutenant General; Luigi Efisio Marras (1888–1991)	2 December 1950	15 April 1954	3 years, 134 days	Italian Army
7	Giuseppe Mancinelli	Lieutenant General; Giuseppe Mancinelli (1895–1976)	16 April 1954	31 March 1959	4 years, 349 days	Italian Army
8	Aldo Rossi	Lieutenant General; Aldo Rossi (1898–1990)	1 April 1959	31 January 1966	6 years, 305 days	Italian Army
9	Aldo Aloia	Lieutenant General; Aldo Aloia (1905–1980)	1 February 1966	24 February 1968	2 years, 23 days	Italian Army
10	Guido Vedovato	Lieutenant General; Guido Vedovato (1906–2001)	25 February 1968	14 January 1970	1 year, 323 days	Italian Army
11	Enzo Marchesi	Lieutenant General; Enzo Marchesi (1907–1996)	15 January 1970	31 July 1972	2 years, 198 days	Italian Army
12	Eugenio Henke	Vice Admiral; Eugenio Henke (1909–1990)	1 August 1972	31 January 1975	2 years, 183 days	Italian Navy
13	Andrea Viglione	Lieutenant General; Andrea Viglione (1914–1992)	1 February 1975	31 January 1978	2 years, 364 days	Italian Army
14	Francesco Cavalera	Lieutenant General; Francesco Cavalera (1919–2013)	1 February 1978	31 January 1980	1 year, 364 days	Italian Air Force
15	Giovanni Torrisi	Vice Admiral; Giovanni Torrisi (1917–1992)	1 February 1980	2 September 1981	1 year, 213 days	Italian Navy
16	Vittorio Santini	Lieutenant General; Vittorio Santini (1920–2012)	3 September 1981	12 October 1983	2 years, 39 days	Italian Army
17	Lamberto Bartolucci	Lieutenant General; Lamberto Bartolucci (1924–2020)	13 October 1983	8 January 1986	2 years, 88 days	Italian Air Force
18	Riccardo Bisogniero	Lieutenant General; Riccardo Bisogniero (1923–2018)	9 January 1986	31 March 1988	2 years, 82 days	Italian Army
19	Mario Porta	Vice Admiral; Mario Porta (1925–2018)	1 April 1988	31 March 1990	1 year, 364 days	Italian Navy
20	Domenico Corcione	Lieutenant General; Domenico Corcione (1929–2020)	1 April 1990	31 December 1993	3 years, 274 days	Italian Army
21	Guido Venturoni	Admiral; Guido Venturoni (1934–2025)	1 January 1994	14 February 1999	5 years, 44 days	Italian Navy
22	Mario Arpino	General; Mario Arpino (born 1937)	15 February 1999	31 March 2001	2 years, 44 days	Italian Air Force
23	Rolando Mosca Moschini	General; Rolando Mosca Moschini (born 1939)	1 April 2001	9 March 2004	2 years, 343 days	Italian Army
24	Giampaolo Di Paola	Admiral; Giampaolo Di Paola (born 1944)	10 March 2004	11 February 2008	3 years, 338 days	Italian Navy
25	Vincenzo Camporini	General; Vincenzo Camporini (born 1946)	12 February 2008	17 January 2011	2 years, 339 days	Italian Air Force
26	Biagio Abrate	General; Biagio Abrate (born 1949)	18 January 2011	30 January 2013	2 years, 12 days	Italian Army
27	Luigi Binelli Mantelli	Admiral; Luigi Binelli Mantelli (born 1950)	31 January 2013	27 February 2015	2 years, 28 days	Italian Navy
28	Claudio Graziano	General; Claudio Graziano (1953–2024)	28 February 2015	5 November 2018	3 years, 250 days	Italian Army
29	Enzo Vecciarelli	General; Enzo Vecciarelli (born 1957)	6 November 2018	18 October 2021	2 years, 347 days	Italian Air Force
30	Giuseppe Cavo Dragone	Admiral; Giuseppe Cavo Dragone (born 1957)	19 October 2021	3 October 2024	2 years, 351 days	Italian Navy
31	Luciano Portolano	General; Luciano Portolano (born 1960)	4 October 2024	Incumbent	1 year, 338 days	Italian Army

== See also ==
- Italian Armed Forces
- Royal Italian Army
- Italian Army
  - Chief of Staff of the Italian Army
