= Giuseppe Mancinelli (general) =

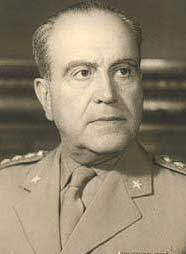
- Born: 1895; Urbino, Italy
- Died: 1976 (aged 80–81); Rome
- Military career
- Allegiance: Italy
- Branch: Italian Army
- Service years: 1912 – 1959
- Rank: Tenente Generale
- Commands: Chief of the Defence Staff; Chairman of the NATO Chief of Staffs' Committee
- Conflicts: World War I World War II: North African Campaign
- Awards: Knight of the Grand Cross of the Order of Merit of the Italian Republic

General Giuseppe Mancinelli (1895–1976) was Chief of the Italian Defence Staff from 1954 to 1959 and chairman of the NATO Military Committee from 1956 to 1957.

During World War II he served as Chief of Staff of the liaison office with Panzer Army Africa from March 1942 to January 1943, and Chief of Staff of the First Italian Army in Tunisia, serving under Marshal of Italy Giovanni Messe, from January 1943 until its surrender on 13 May 1943. He was then a prisoner of war in Great Britain until 1944.
