= Accademia Aeronautica =

Italian Air Force academy

Coordinates: 40.822°N 14.141°E

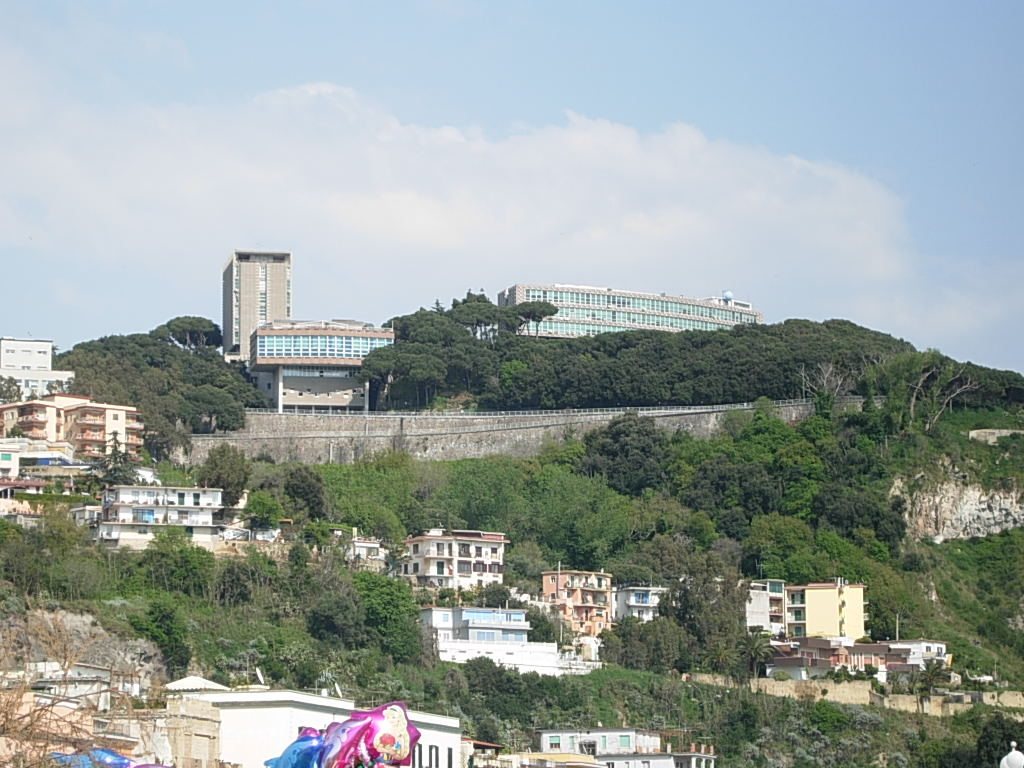
- Type: Air force academy
- Established: 5 November 1923
- Head: Generale di Brigata Aerea Enrico Degni
- Location: Pozzuoli, Campania, Italy
- Website: www.aeronautica.difesa.it

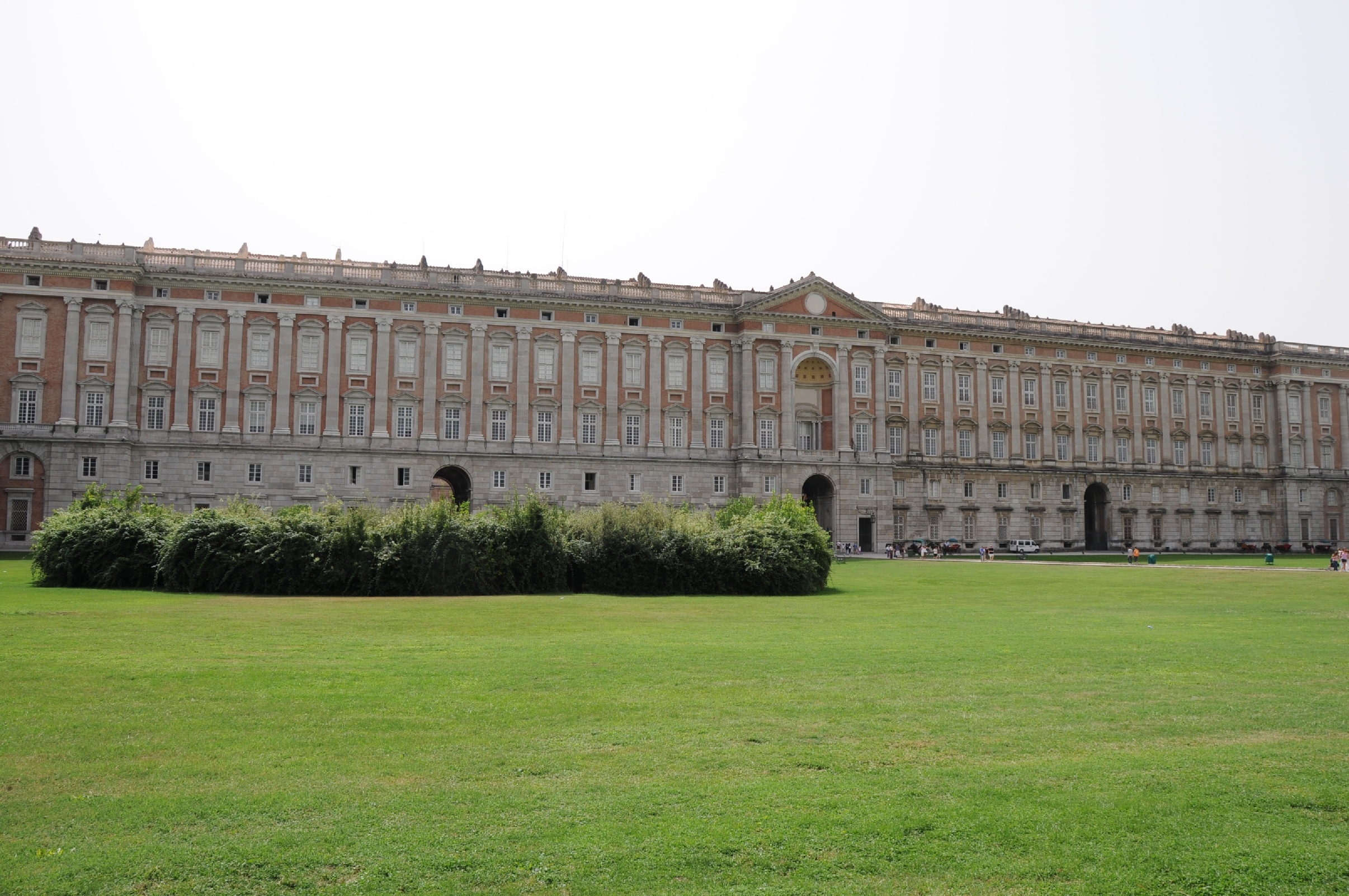
The Palace of Caserta, second seat of the Accademia from 1926 to 1943. Prior to 1926, classes were held at the Italian Naval Academy in Livorno

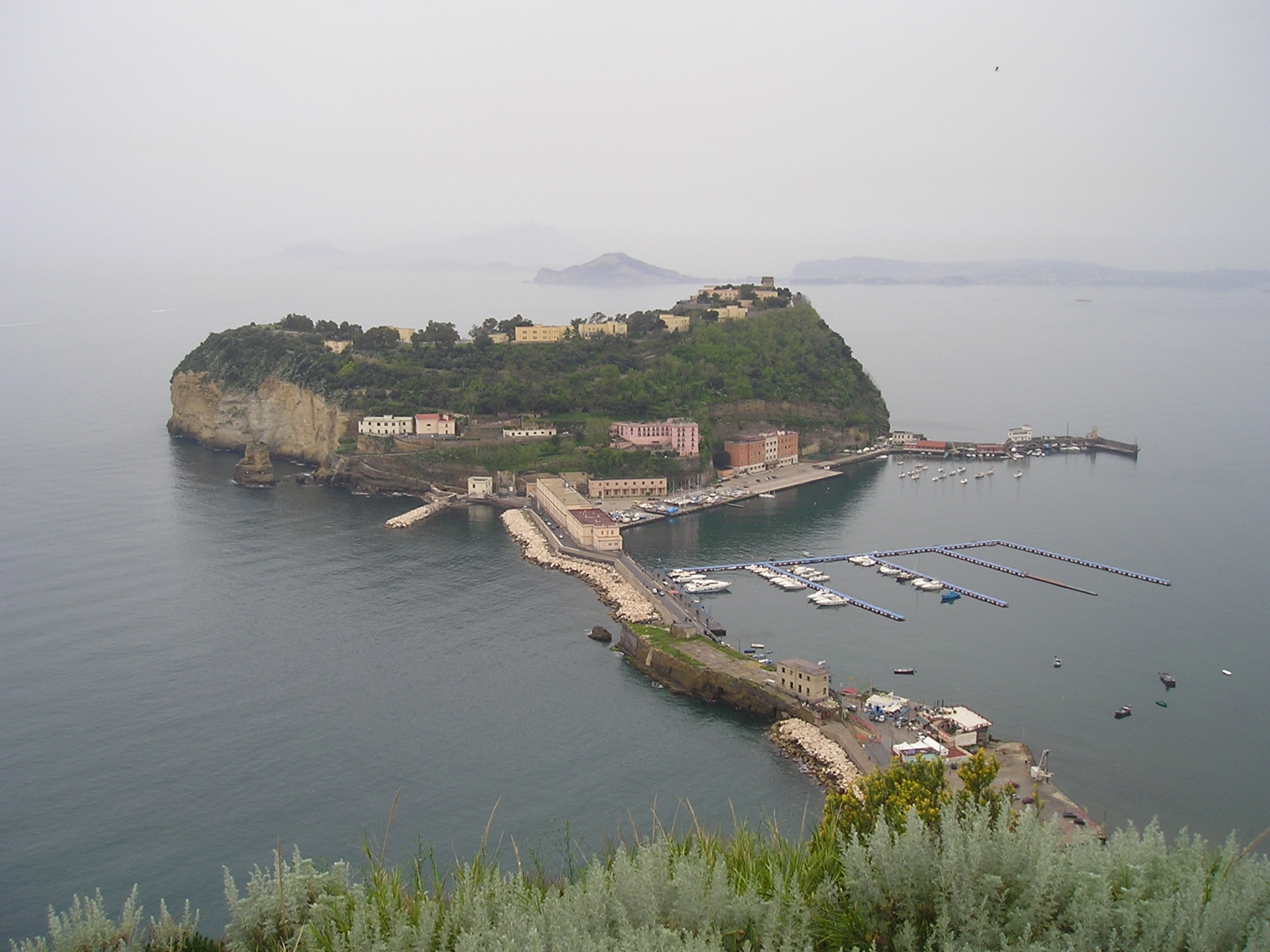
The island Nisida was the site of the academy from 1945 to 1962

The Accademia Aeronautica is the Italian Air Force Academy, the institute for the training of Air Force officers. It's located in Pozzuoli in the province of Naples, in the Italian region of Campania. Among the oldest aviation academies in the world, it was founded in 1923.

In its academic programs, the academy coordinates with the nearby University of Naples Federico II. Admission to the academy is subject to the passing of a test open to all Italian citizens between 17 and 22 years old, with a high school diploma. The selection process, which happens between February and September, includes an examination, a medical check, and written and oral tests.

== History ==
The Italian air force was founded as an independent service by King Vittorio Emanuele III of the Kingdom of Italy (Regno d'Italia) on March 28, 1923. The air force was then known as the Regia Aeronautica (Royal Air Force). The first commander of the academy was Ship-of-the-line captain Giulio Valli; the top student in the first graduating class in 1926 was the noted aviator Fausto Cecconi.

By 1928 the officers' school was supported by separate schools for aircraft mechanics and meteorologists, then further specialized training for bomber pilots and fighter pilots.

From 1926 through 1943 the academy was housed in the Palace of Caserta, a Baroque royal palace of the 18th century, now a UNESCO World Heritage Site. The 1942 film The Three Pilots provides a glimpse of the palace as an aviation school. The academy also trained international students, for instance a large group of Peruvian students who began the three-year course in 1939, acquiring "impressive expertise".

The battles of World War II on Italian soil led to the Italian Armistice of September 3, 1943, which split the Air Force into the Italian Co-Belligerent Air Force in the south aligned with the Allies, and the pro-Axis Aeronautica Nazionale Repubblicana in the north until the end of the war.

In 1946 the re-constituted post-war Aeronautica Militare Italiana established the academy on the island of Nisida in the Bay of Naples. In December 1961 the academy moved to its current purpose-built facility on a hilltop overlooking the bay.
