= Paolo Treu =

Italian naval officer (born 1958)

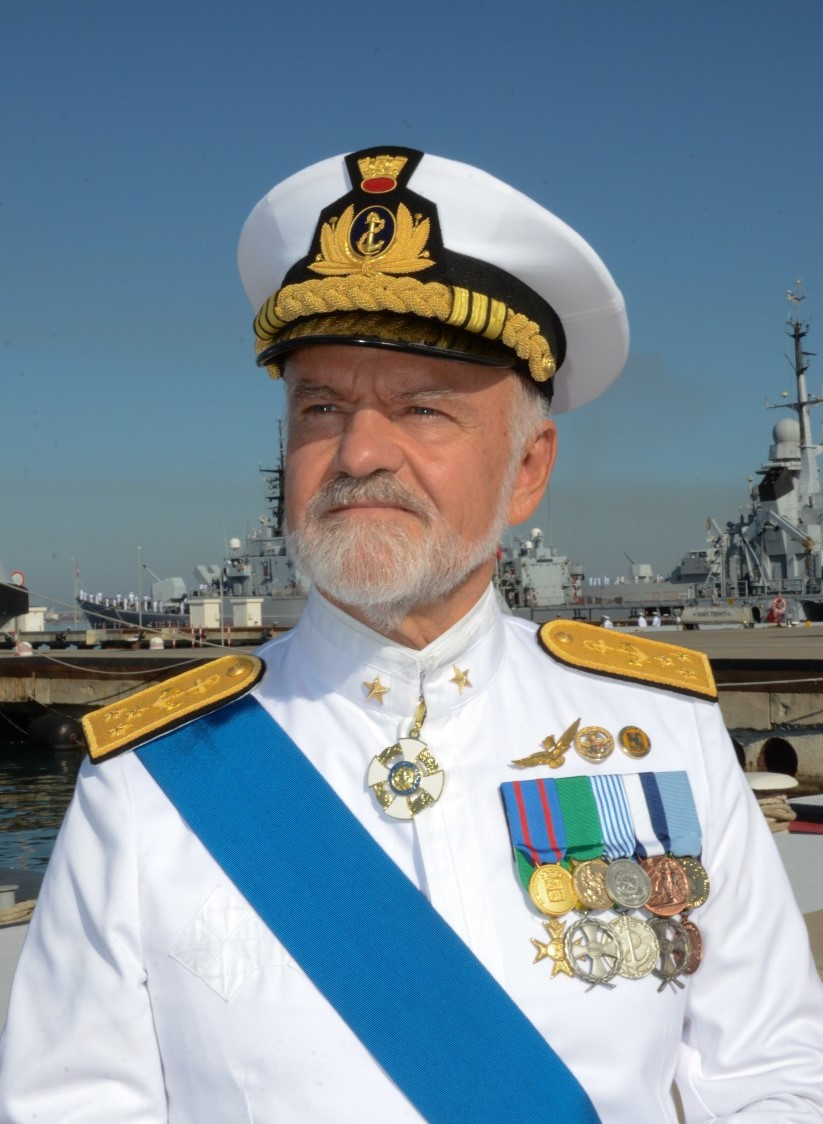
- Treu in 2019
- Born: 15 July 1958 (age 68); San Vito al Tagliamento (Italy)
- Military career
- Branch: Italian Navy
- Service years: 1977–2021
- Rank: Ammiraglio di Squadra
- Commands: Italian Naval Fleet; Joint Force Maritime Component - Operation "NATO Response Force 2014"; Italian 30th Naval Task Group - "The Country in Motion" Campaign; Italian Navy's Major Surface Combatants; Italian Maritime Forces (NATO); Task Group for "NATO Response Force 2005" Operation; Giuseppe Garibaldi (C 551); Espero (F 576); Embarked Aircraft Squadron; Milazzo (M5552) (Lerici-class minehunter)

Paolo Treu (born 15 July 1958 in San Vito al Tagliamento (Italy), is a retired Italian Ammiraglio di Squadra (OF-8 NATO rank) who served as Commander in Chief Naval Fleet, the highest operational appointment in the Italian Navy. During a distinguished naval career spanning more than four decades, he commanded numerous naval units and concluded his active service as Commander in Chief of the Italian Naval Fleet.

== Early life and education ==
Paolo Treu entered the Italian Naval Academy in October 1977, after completing his education at the Francesco Morosini Naval Military School. In 1981, he was commissioned as an Guardiamarina (OF-1 NATO rank), Saoren Class, and graduated with a degree in Maritime and Naval Sciences.

From 1982 to 1983, he attended flight training with the United States Navy, qualifying both as a fixed-wing pilot on the Beechcraft T-44 Pegasus and as a helicopter pilot on the Bell UH-1 Iroquois.

Upon returning to Italy as a Sottotenente di Vascello (OF-1 NATO rank), he converted to the Agusta-Bell AB-212 and served as a shipborne helicopter pilot.

In 1990, following the Italian Navy's decision to introduce the AV-8B Harrier II Plus into service, then Tenente di Vascello (OF-2 NATO rank), Treu returned to the United States to begin advanced fast-jet training.

After qualifying for aircraft carrier operations aboard USS Lexington (CV-16) flying the North American T-2 Buckeye, and subsequently qualifying as a jet pilot on the TA-4J Skyhawk, he completed operational conversion training on the AV-8B Harrier, before joining VMA-542 of the United States Marine Corps.

In 1994, he became the first Italian pilot to qualify as a flight instructor on the radar-equipped AV-8B Harrier II Plus.

== Career ==
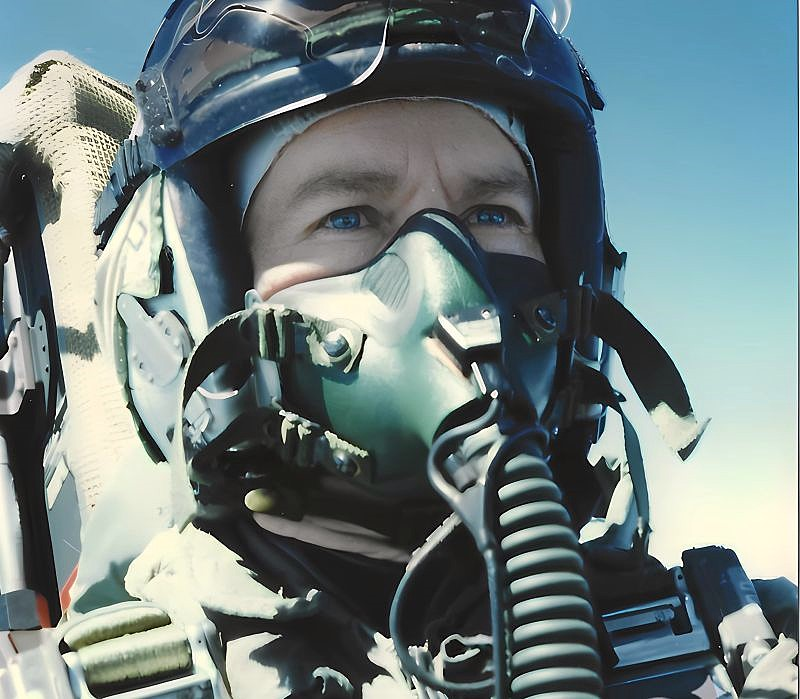
Paolo Treu on AV-8B Harrier II Plus as Capitano di Corvetta – 1994

As a Tenente di Vascello, during the 1987–1988 Gulf War, he served as Air Operations Officer aboard the Italian frigate Libeccio (F 572).

From 1988 to 1989, he commanded the italian ship Milazzo (M 5552) (Lerici-class minehunter).

In January 1995, after returning to Italy as Executive Officer of the Italian Navy's Embarked Aircraft Squadron (GRUPAER), he took part in Operation Somalia III, operating from the italian aircraft carrier Giuseppe Garibaldi (C 551).

From 1996 to 1997, he commanded the Embarked Aircraft Squadron, participating in Operation Alba (Non-Combatant Evacuation Operation). From 1997 to 1998, he commanded the italian frigate Espero (F 576) during her deployment with the Standing NATO Maritime Group 2 (SNMG2) in the Mediterranean Sea.

From 1998 to 1999, he served at Fleet Headquarters (CINCNAV) as Assistant to the Deputy Chief of Staff for AV-8B Plus Operations, supporting the operational employment of the aircraft during Operation Allied Force.

On 1 January 2000, following the establishment of the Italian Navy Fleet Air Arm Command (COMFORAER), he was appointed Head of the Fixed-Wing Office and Chairman of NATO's VSTOL Working Group.

Following service as the Italian Navy Representative at the United States Central Command (CENTCOM) in Tampa, Florida, where he supported Operation Enduring Freedom, he was appointed Chief of Staff of the Italian Navy Fleet Air Arm Command (COMFORAER) on 17 August 2002.

On 27 September 2004, after promotion to the rank of Capitano di Vascello (OF-5 NATO rank), he assumed command of the aircraft carrier ITS Giuseppe Garibaldi (C 551). From 1 July 2005, he also served as Commander Task Group during Italy's participation in NATO Response Force 5.

He subsequently served as Assistant to the Chief of Staff of the Italian Navy and was promoted to Contrammiraglio (OF-6 NATO rank) on 23 March 2007.

On 5 September 2008, he was appointed Head of the Sixth Aircraft Division of the Italian Navy General Staff and Commander of the Italian Navy Fleet Air Arm. He was promoted to Ammiraglio di Divisione (OF-7 NATO rank) on 1 July 2012.

On 30 July 2013, he was appointed Commander of the Italian Navy's Major Surface Combatants - including destroyers, frigates and support ships — and Commander, Italian Maritime Forces (NATO).

Between 12 November 2013 and 9 April 2014, he also commanded the 30th Naval Task Group, comprising the Italian aircraft carrier Cavour (C 550), the replenishment Italian ship Etna (A 5326), the Italian frigate Carlo Bergamini (F 590) and the offshore vessel Comandanti-class patrol vessel Borsini (P 491). During this deployment, entitled "The Country in Motion", the task group promoted Italy's strategic, diplomatic, industrial and humanitarian interests throughout the Middle East and Africa.

From 1 January to 11 September 2014, he also served as Maritime Component Commander for the NATO Response Force 2014.

On 26 September 2014, he was appointed Director of the Fourth Department (Armament Programme Coordination) within the General Secretariat of Defence / National Armaments Directorate of the Italian Ministry of Defence (Italy). He was promoted to the rank of Ammiraglio di Squadra (OF-8 NATO rank) on 1 July 2016.

From 8 September 2016 to 10 October 2019, he served as Deputy Chief of Staff of the Italian Navy.

From 13 October 2019 until his retirement on 15 July 2021, he served as Commander in Chief Naval Fleet (CINCNAV), the Italian Navy's highest operational command.

He retired from active service on 16 July 2021, bringing to a close fortyfour years of distinguished service in the Italian Navy.

== Awards in military service ==
- – 4th Class / Officer of the Military Order of Italy
- – 2nd Class – Grand Officer – Order of Merit of the Italian Republic
- – Italian Navy Gold Cross of Merit
- – Maurician medal (for 50 years military career)
- – Gold Medal for Long Aerial Navigation
- – Gold Medal for Distinguished Long Command
- – Bronze Medal for Long Maritime Service (10 Years)
- – Gold Service Cross with Star
- – Commemorative Cross for Military Operations in Somalia
- – Commemorative Medal for Italian Navy Personnel Deployed to Afghanistan
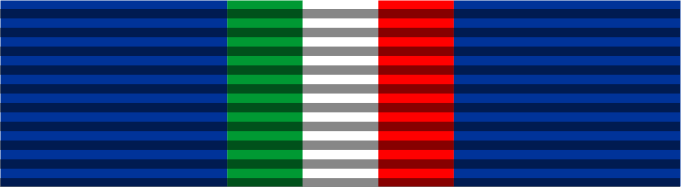
- – Commemorative Medal for Italian Navy Personnel Deployed to the Persian Gulf
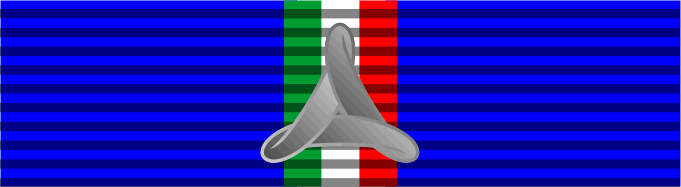
- – Italian Civil Protection Medal for Public Merit (Third Class)

== Qualification Badges and Merit Distinctions ==
- – Merit Badge for Service on the Italian Navy General Staff

Military offices
Preceded by Donato Marzano	Commander in Chief Naval Fleet; 2019–2021	Succeeded by Enrico Credendino
