= Filippo Foffi =

Italian Navy officer

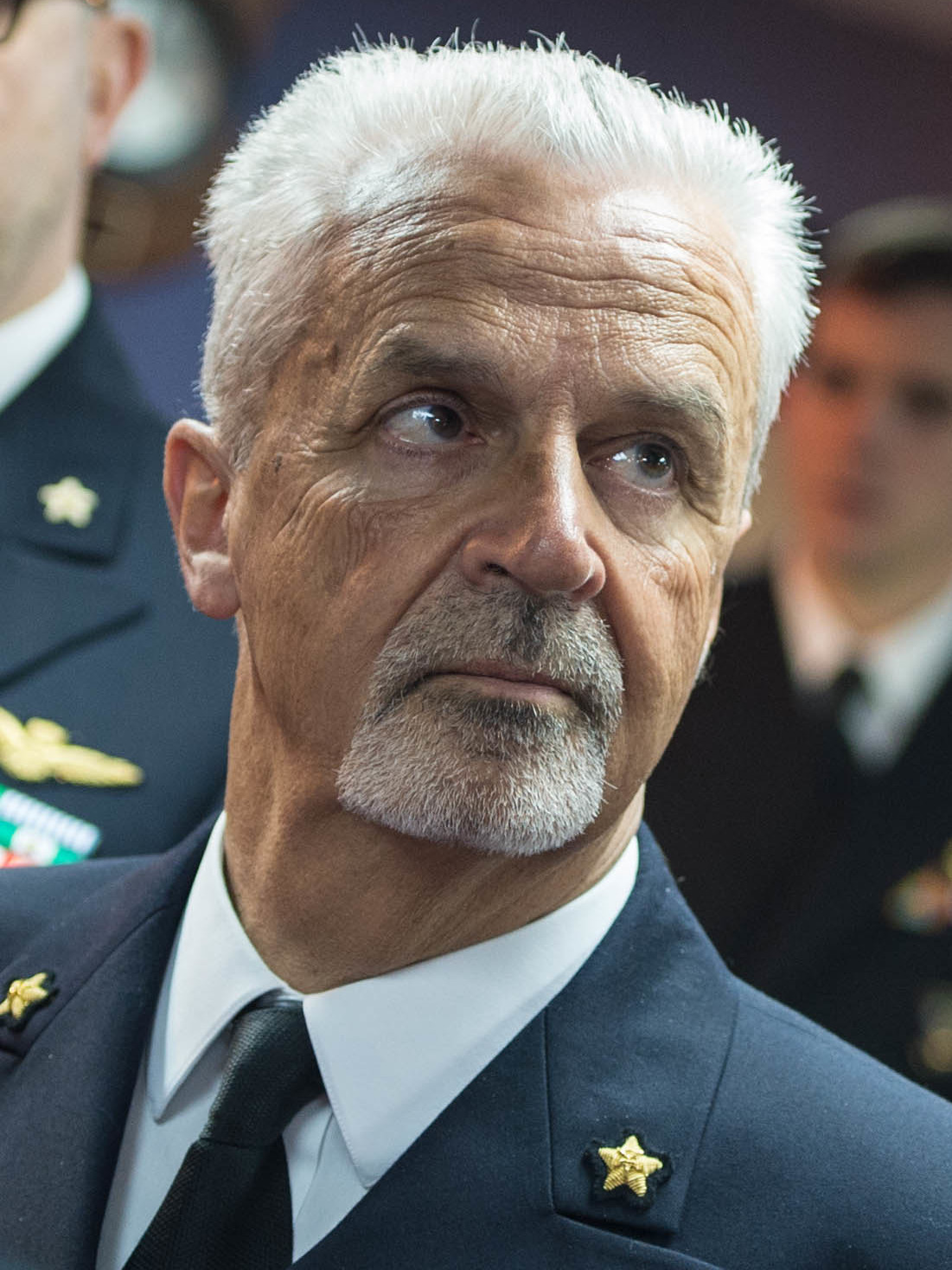
- Born: Filippo Maria Foffi; 15 September 1953 (age 73); Rome, Italy
- Military career
- Allegiance: Italy
- Branch: Italian Navy
- Service years: 1972 -
- Rank: Vice Admiral
- Commands: Commander in Chief Naval Fleet; ITS Espero; ITS Garibaldi

Vice Admiral Filippo Maria Foffi is an Italian Navy officer, who served as Head of Fleet Command of the Italian Navy. He joined the Navy and attended the Italian Naval Academy from 1972 to 1976.

In January 2012, he was appointed Chief of Personnel before being promoted to vice admiral on 1 July 2012 and appointed Deputy Chief of Naval Staff.

He served as Commander in Chief of the Italian Fleet from 25 January 2013 until 14 September 2016.

Military offices
Preceded by Giuseppe De Giorgi	Commander in Chief Naval Fleet; 2013-2016	Succeeded by Donato Marzano
