= Donato Marzano =

Italian naval officer (born 1956)

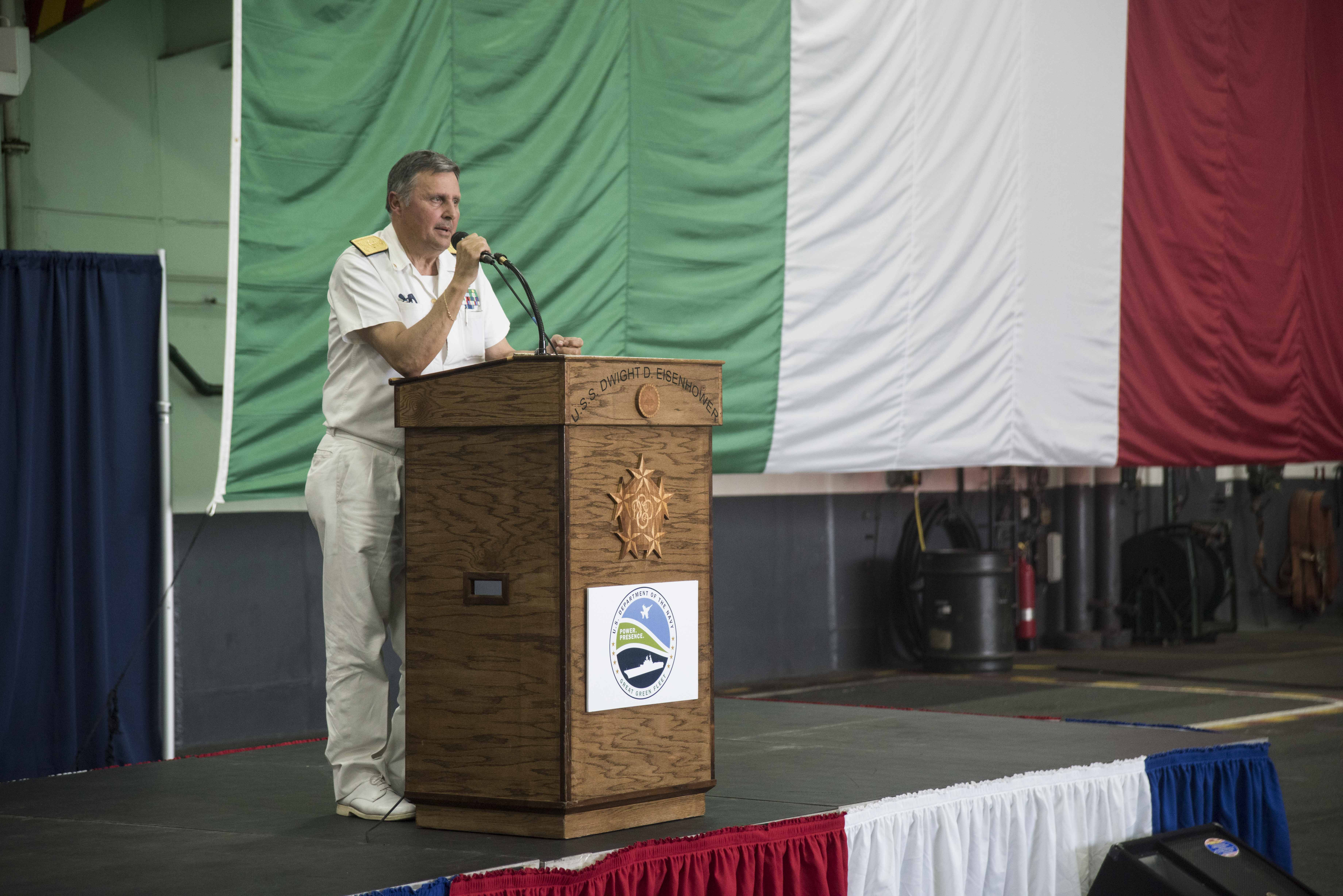
- Born: 12 October 1956 (age 70); Taranto, Italy
- Military career
- Allegiance: Italy
- Branch: Italian Navy
- Service years: 1975 -
- Rank: Vice Admiral
- Commands: Commander in Chief Naval Fleet; Head of Logistics Command; ITS Durand De La Penne; ITS Lerici

Vice Admiral (Ammiraglio di Squadra) Donato Marzano is an Italian naval officer currently serving as Commander in Chief Naval Fleet.

He joined the Navy in 1975 and graduated from the Naval Academy in 1978. He served on surface ships and commanded the minehunter ITS Lerici and commanded Luigi Durand De La Penne during Operation Enduring Freedom. He served as the Chief of the General Office of the Chief of Defence from 31 January 2013 to 27 February 2015.

He served as Head of Logistics Command from 4 March 2015 to September 2016, when he was appointed Commander in Chief Naval Fleet.

Military offices
Preceded by Filippo Maria Foffi	Commander in Chief Naval Fleet; 2016-2019	Succeeded by Paolo Treu
