= Italian Naval Aviation =

- Aviazione Navale
- Active: 1913-1937; 1956-Present
- Country: Italy
- Branch: Italian Navy
- Type: Naval aviation
- Size: 2,000 personnel (2015)
- Part of: Commander in Chief Naval Fleet

Commanders
- Current commander: Rear Admiral Giancarlo Ciappina

Insignia
- Roundel

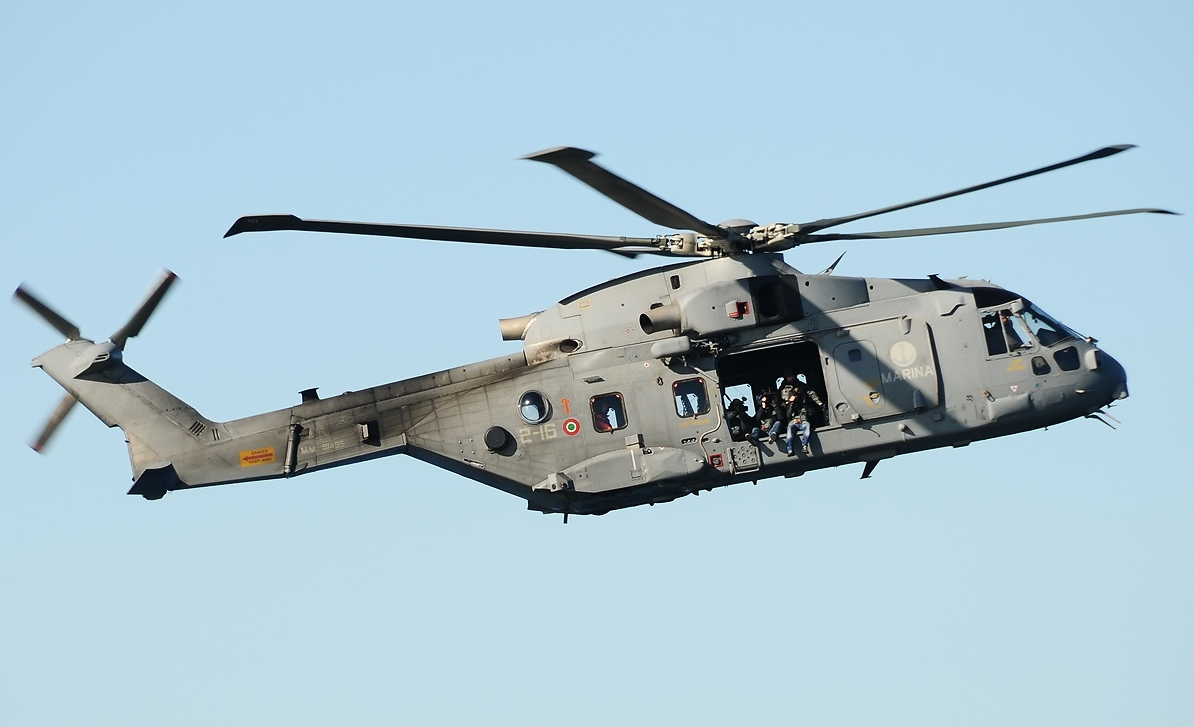
EH-101-410 Merlin

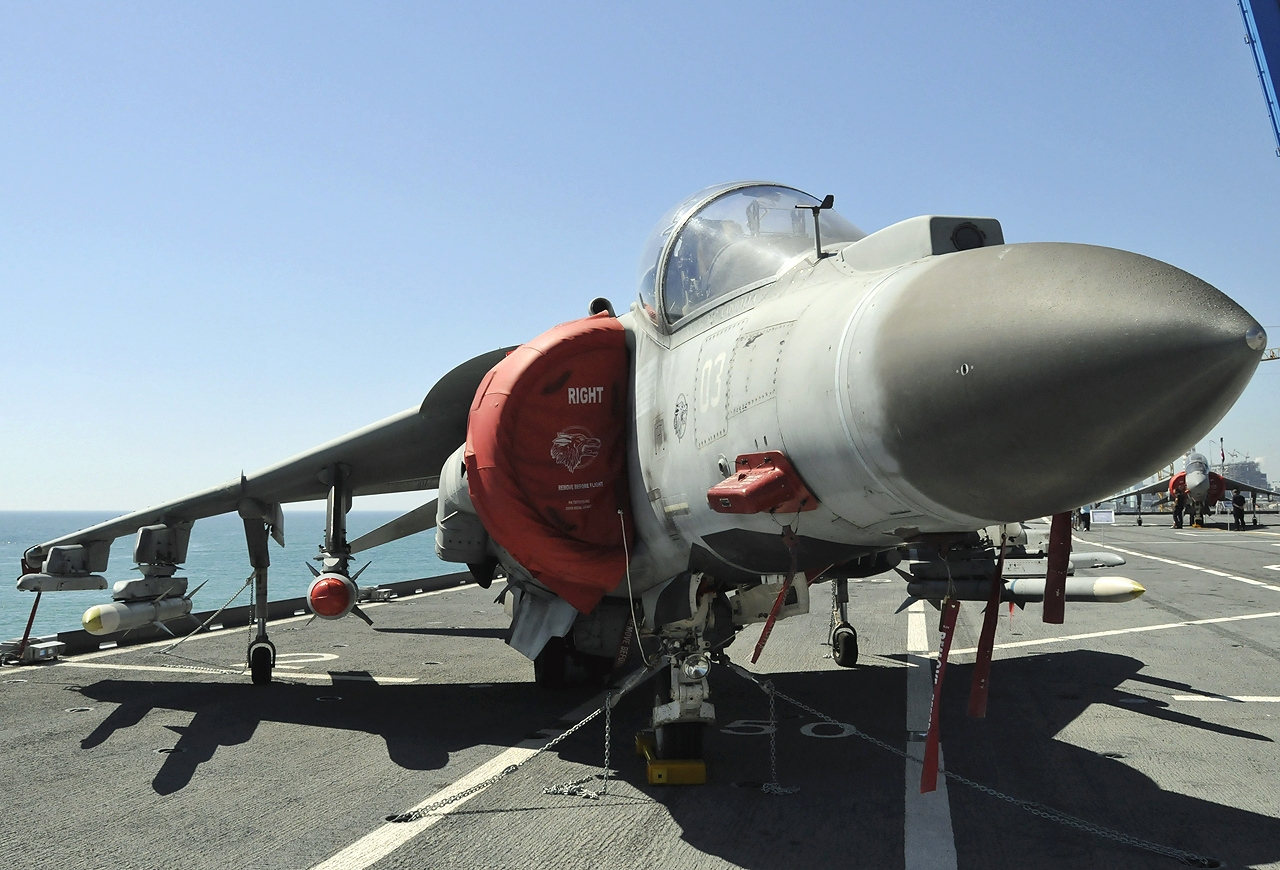
A Marina Militare AV-8B Harrier II aboard Cavour

The Italian Naval Aviation (Italian: Aviazione Navale) is the naval air component of the Italian Navy composed of around 2000 men and women and 69 aircraft and helicopters.

== History ==
It is more commonly known as Naval Aviation as it received various official designations throughout its service and its origins date back to 1913, when it was created as the air branch of the Navy. The service was then disbanded and integrated into the Italian Air Force, upon the creation of this new branch in 1937, when a law gave control of all national fixed-wing air assets to the Italian Air Force.

Having been reactivated in 1956 to operate the Navy's new shipborne helicopters entering service with the Italian frigates. The ban on fixed-wing aircraft was lifted in 1989, and the Italian Navy acquired Harrier II fighters to fly from the aircraft carrier Giuseppe Garibaldi.

In 2009, the Giuseppe Garibaldi was replaced as the flagship of the Italian navy by the new and larger aircraft carrier Cavour.

== Organisation ==
The units of the Italian Naval Aviation are based at three civil airports. A small detachment is based at the Italian Air Force's the Pratica di Mare Air Base.

- Air Forces Command (Comando delle Forze Aeree - COMFORAER), in Rome
  - Aerial Section (Sezione Aerea - SEZAER), at Pratica di Mare Air Base with 3x P.180 Maritime liaison planes
  - Naval Aircraft Station (Stazione Aeromobili della Marina Militare - MARISTAER), at Taranto-Grottaglie Airport
    - Carrier Air Group (Gruppo Aerei Imbarcati - GRUPAER)
      - Operations Unit (Reparto Operazioni) with AV-8B+ Harrier II fighters (being replaced by F-35B Lightning II)
      - Operational Support Unit (Reparto Supporto Operativo)
      - Operational Informations Unit (Reparto Informazioni Operative)
    - 4th Helicopter Group (Quarto Gruppo Elicotteri - GRUPELICOT QUATTRO)
      - Operations Unit (Reparto Operazioni) with SH-90A ASuW/ASW helicopters and Camcopter S-100 unmanned aerial vehicles
      - Training Unit (Reparto Addestramento) with SH-90A ASuW/ASW helicopters
      - Operational Support Unit (Reparto Supporto Operativo)
      - Operational Informations Unit (Reparto Informazioni Operative)
  - Naval Helicopter Station Luni (Stazione Elicotteri della Marina Militare Luni - MARISTAELI Luni), at Sarzana-Luni Airport
    - 1st Helicopter Group (Primo Gruppo Elicotteri - GRUPELICOT UNO)
      - Helicopter Assault Unit (Reparto Eliassalto) with MH-101A transport helicopters supporting COMSUBIN
      - ASuW/ASW/EW Unit (Reparto AWW/ASW/EW) with EH-101A HEW helicopters
      - Operational Support Unit (Reparto Supporto Operativo)
      - Operational Informations Unit (Reparto Informazioni Operative)
    - 5th Helicopter Group (Quinto Gruppo Elicotteri - GRUPELICOT CINQUE)
      - Helicopter Assault Unit (Reparto Eliassalto) with MH-90A tactical transport helicopters supporting COMSUBIN
      - ASuW/ASW Unit (Reparto AWW/ASW) with SH-90A ASuW/ASW helicopters
      - Operational Support Unit (Reparto Supporto Operativo)
      - Operational Informations Unit (Reparto Informazioni Operative)
  - Naval Helicopter Station Catania (Stazione Elicotteri della Marina Militare Catania - MARISTAELI Catania), at Catania–Fontanarossa Airport
    - 2nd Helicopter Group (Secondo Gruppo Elicotteri - GRUPELICOT DUE)
      - Operations Unit (Reparto Operazioni) with SH-90A ASuW/ASW helicopters
      - Operational Support Unit (Reparto Supporto Operativo)
      - Operational Informations Unit (Reparto Informazioni Operative)
    - 3rd Helicopter Group (Terzo Gruppo Elicotteri - GRUPELICOT TRE)
      - Operations Unit (Reparto Operazioni) with SH-101A ASuW/ASW helicopters
      - Training Unit (Reparto Addestramento) with SH-101A ASuW/ASW helicopters
      - Operational Support Unit (Reparto Supporto Operativo)
      - Operational Informations Unit (Reparto Informazioni Operative)

== Aircraft ==
=== Current inventory ===
Picture	Aircraft	Origin	Type	Variant	In service	Notes
Combat aircraft
	F-35 Lightning II	USA	Multirole stealth fighter, STOVL	F-35B	10	F-35B acquisition: 15 (2012); 5 (2024)
	AV-8B Harrier II	UK; USA	V/STOL	AV-8B+	11	Being replaced by the F-35B.
Transport
	P-180	Italy	Transport	P-180 Maritme	3	
Helicopters
	AW101	Italy; UK	SAR	SH-101A	10	
	AW101	Italy; UK	VERTREP	MH-101A	8	
	AW101	Italy; UK	ASW / ASuW	EH-101A	4	
	NH90	European Union	ASW / ASuW	SH-90A (NFH)	45	Delivered between 2011 and October 2023. 1 lost in July 2023.
	NH90	European Union	Transport	MH-90A (TTH)	10	Delivered between 2011 and October 2023. 1 lost in July 2023.
	AB-212	USA; Italy	ASW	SH-212A	22	Licensed built by Agusta.
	AB-212	USA; Italy	Utility	MH-212B	22	Licensed built by Agusta.
Trainer aircraft
	AV-8B Harrier II	UK; USA	Conversion trainer	TAV-8B	1	
UAV
	Camcopter S-100	Austria	ISR, helicopter UAV		2	
	ScanEagle	USA	ISR, fixed-wing UAV		10	

== Bibliography ==
- Stefano Reduzzi (2013). Cent'anni di aviazione navale. Italian Naval Aviation: The first 100 years. 1913-2013. Aviation Collectables Company. ISBN 978-8890523182.
