= Italian ship Espero =

Espero has been borne by at least three ships of the Italian Navy and may refer to:

- Italian destroyer Espero (1904), a Nembo-class destroyer launched in 1904 renamed Turbine in 1921 and discarded in 1923.
- Italian destroyer Espero (1927), a Turbine-class destroyer launched in 1927 and sunk in 1940.
- Italian frigate Espero (F 576), a Maestrale-class frigate launched in 1983.
