= Ernesto Rubin de Cervin (admiral) =

Italian admiral

- Born: 19 November 1860; Turin, Kingdom of Sardinia
- Died: 27 September 1915 (aged 54) Brindisi, Italy
- Allegiance: Kingdom of Italy
- Branch: Regia Marina
- Service years: 1874–1915
- Rank: Contrammiraglio (Rear Admiral)
- Conflict: Italo-Turkish War, World War I

Ernesto Rubin de Cervin (19 November 1860 – 27 September 1915) was an Italian admiral.

== Life ==
Born into a noble family, Ernesto Rubin de Cervin joined the Naval Academy in 1874, and graduated as a guardiamarina in 1879. He participated in 1888, as a Tenente di Vascello to the Italian effort to penetrate the Horn of Africa. Reaching the rank of Capitano di vascello by 1907, he took part in the Italo-Turkish War as commander of the battleship Vittorio Emanuele.

Promoted to the rank of Contrammiraglio in 1913, he took command of the 3rd Division, flying his flag on the battleship Benedetto Brin, stationed at Brindisi. On the morning of 27 September 1915, months after Italy had entered World War I on the side of the Entente, the Benedetto Brin suffered an accidental magazine explosion, killing 456 of its 943-strong crew, including Rubin de Cervin.
