= List of Harrier variants =

This is a list of variants of the Harrier jump jet family of V/STOL ground attack fighter aircraft.

== Hawker Siddeley P.1127 ==
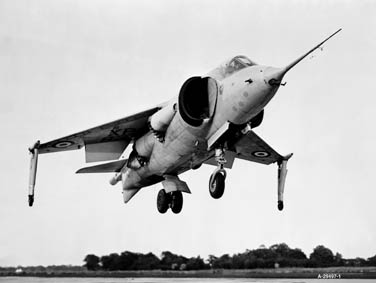
Prototype Hawker P.1127 XP831 in 1962

P.1127
Experimental V/STOL fighter, two prototypes and four development aircraft.

Kestrel FGA.1
Aircraft for the tripartite evaluation squadron, nine built, six later transferred to the United States where they were designated XV-6A.

P.1127 (RAF)
Development V/STOL ground attack and reconnaissance fighter, six built as pre-production evaluation aircraft before the type was ordered into production as the Harrier GR.1.

XV-6A
United States military designation for the six Kestrel FGA.1 transferred to the United States.

VZ-12
United States Army designation for two P.1127 development aircraft, not delivered.

== Hawker Siddeley Harrier ==
=== Single-seat ===
Harrier GR.1
Initial production version for RAF, powered by 19,000 lbf (84.7 kN) Rolls-Royce Pegasus 6 (Pegasus Mk 101 in RAF service). A total of 61 built.

Harrier GR.1A
Upgraded version of the GR.1, the main difference being the uprated (20,500 lbf (91.4 kN)) Pegasus 10 (or Pegasus Mk 102) engine. 17 GR.1As new-built and a further 41 GR.1s upgraded to GR.1A configuration, for a total of 58 GR.1As.

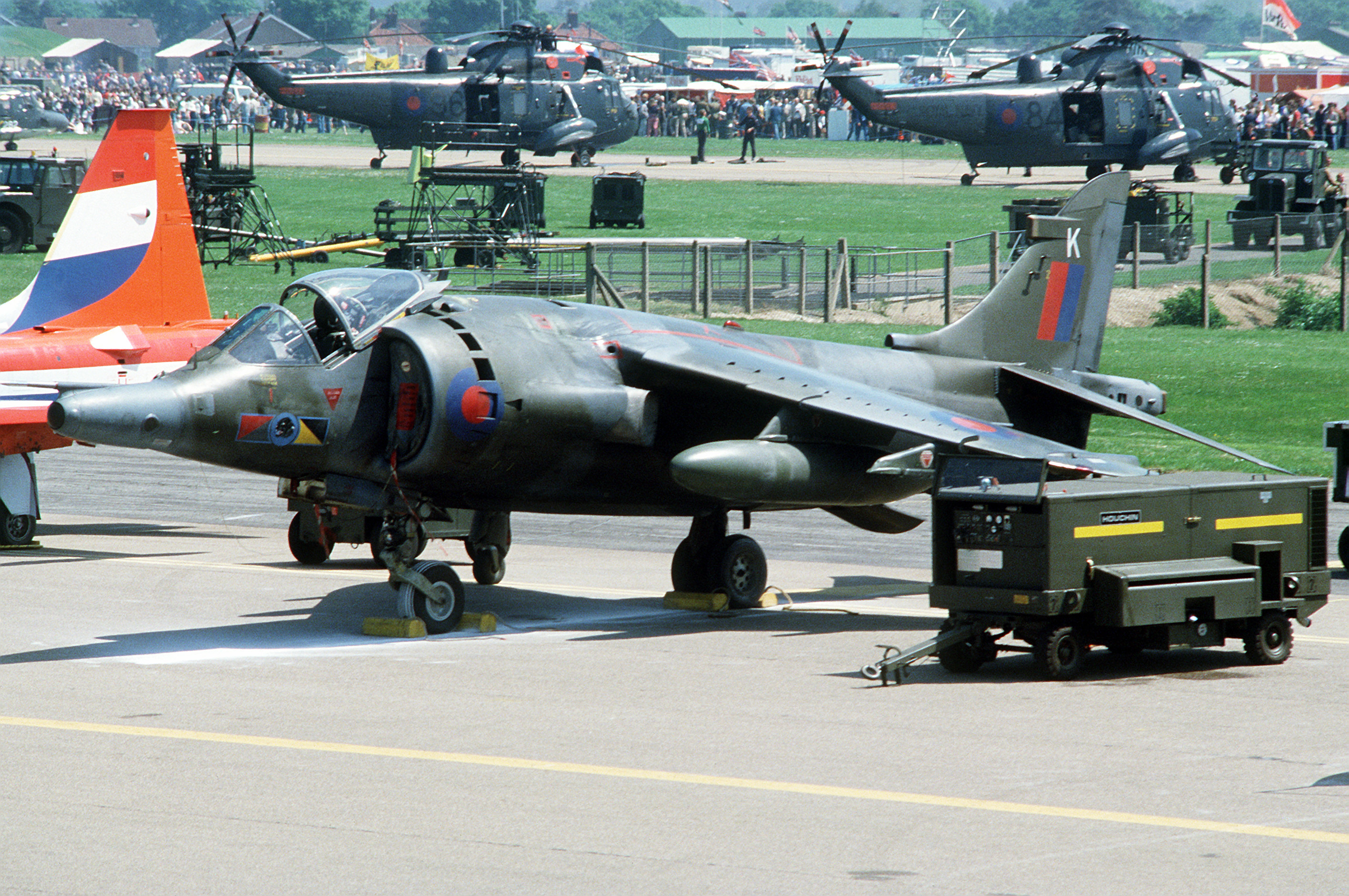
A Royal Air Force Harrier GR.3 aircraft parked on the flight line during Air Fete '84 at RAF Mildenhall.

Harrier GR.3
Featured its sensors (such as a laser tracker in the lengthened nose and radar warning receiver on the fin and tail boom) and a further uprated (21,500 lbf (95.9 kN)) Pegasus 11 (Pegasus Mk 103). A total of 40 new built, with last delivered in December 1986, and about 62 converted from GR.1/GR.1As.

AV-8A Harrier
Single-seat ground-attack, close air support, reconnaissance, and fighter aircraft, powered by Pegasus 11 (designated F102-RR-402 by US) with simplified nav/attack system. 102 ordered for the USMC. Company designation Harrier Mk 50. (Note: Under British military aircraft designations export variants of aircraft tend to receive Mark numbers starting from 50.)

AV-8C
Upgraded AV-8A for the USMC. Designated Model 258AP by McDonnell Douglas.

AV-8S Matador
Export version of the AV-8A Harrier for the Spanish Navy, later sold to the Royal Thai Navy. Spanish Navy designation VA-1 Matador. Company designation Harrier Mk 53 for the first production batch, and Mk 55 for the second batch.

=== Two-seat ===
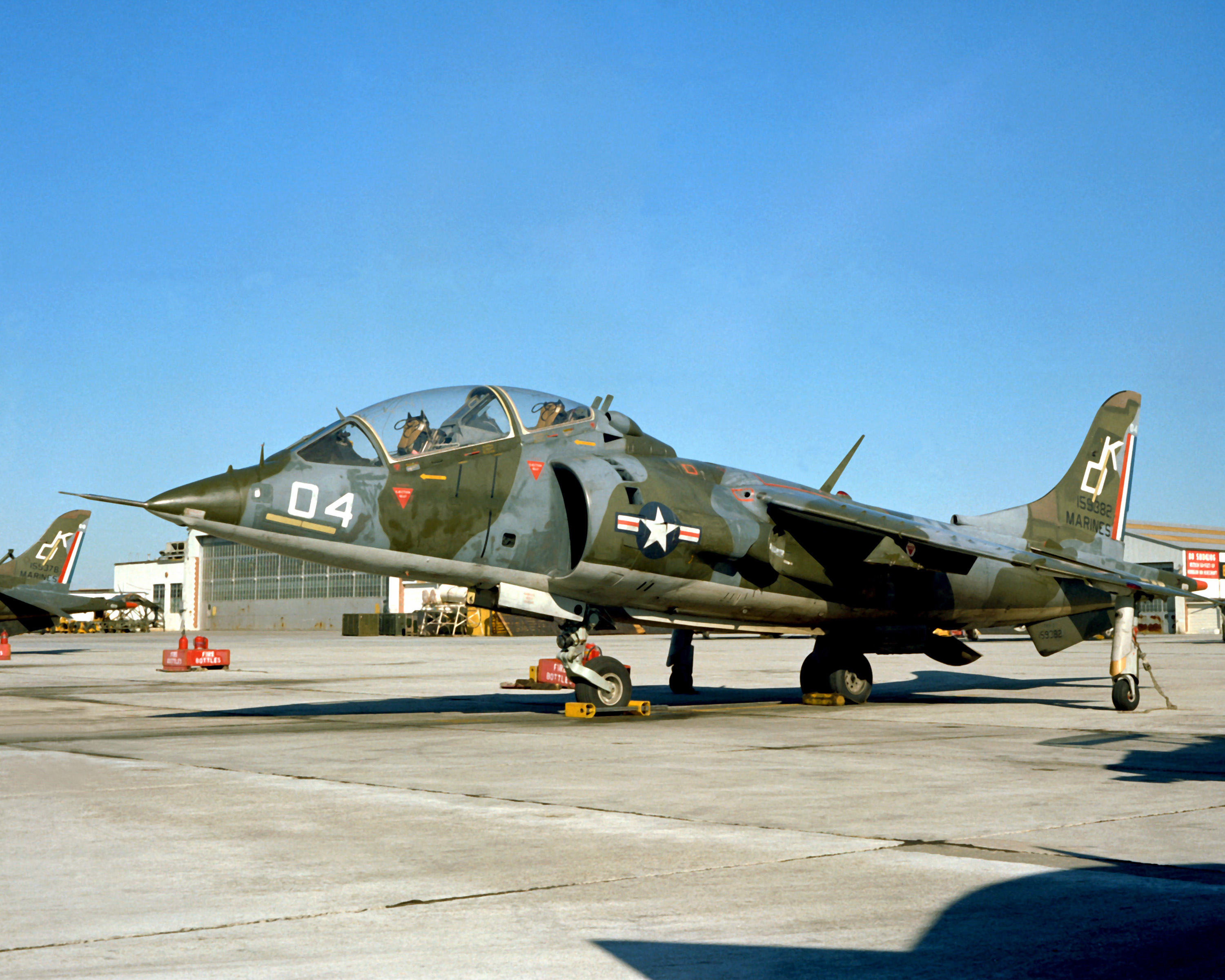
A USMC TAV-8A Harrier from VMAT-203 on the flight line.

Harrier T.2
Lengthened two-seat training version for the RAF, powered by Pegasus Mk 101 engine and with taller fin.

Harrier T.2A
Upgraded T.2, powered by a Pegasus Mk 102.

Harrier T.4
Two-seat training version for the Royal Air Force, equivalent to the GR.3, with Pegasus Mk 103 engine, laser seeker and radar warning receiver. Reverted to short fin of single seater.

Harrier T.4A
T.4 without laser seeker .

Harrier T.4N
Two-seat training version of the T.4A for the Royal Navy, with avionics (excluding radar) based on Sea Harrier FRS.1.

Harrier T.4(I)
Conversion of ex-RAF T.4 airframes by BAE Systems, for the Indian Navy. Attrition replacements for India's Harrier T.60. Delivered from December 2003.

Harrier T.8
Naval trainer modified from early trainer variants and fitted with Sea Harrier F(A).2 avionics.

Harrier T.52
Two-seat company demonstrator of an export variant of the T.2, originally Pegasus 102 powered but uprated to Pegasus 103 following an accident in 1971, one built first flown 15 September 1971. Registered G-VTOL

Harrier T.60
Export version of the T.4N two-seat training version for the Indian Navy.

TAV-8A Harrier
Two-seater training version for the USMC, powered by a Pegasus Mk 103. Company designation Harrier Mk 54. Eight built.

TAV-8S Matador
Export version of the TAV-8A Harrier for the Spanish Navy. Later sold to the Royal Thai Navy. Spanish Navy designation VAE-1 Matador. Company designation Harrier Mk 54.

== British Aerospace Sea Harrier ==
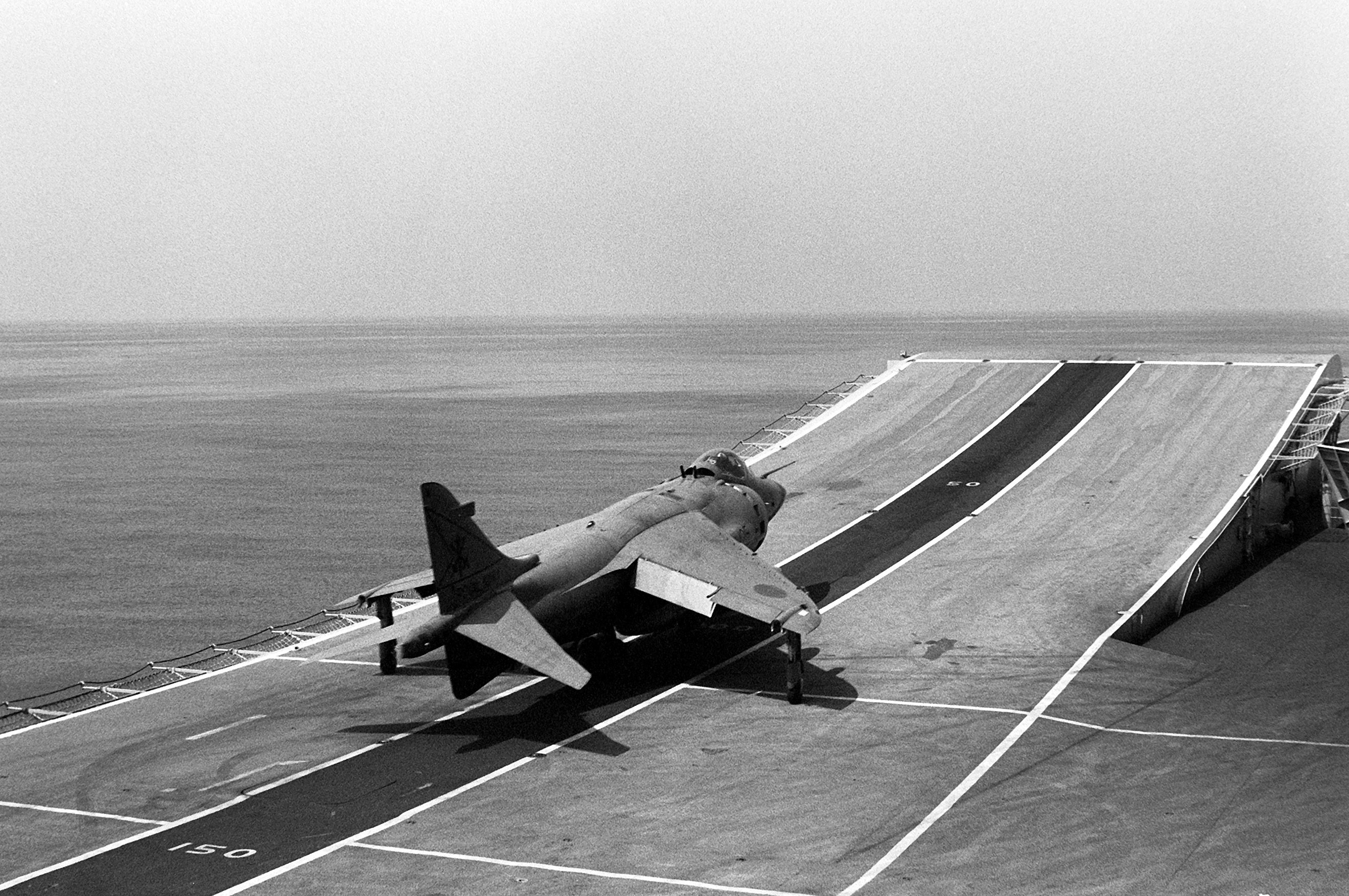
A Sea Harrier FRS.1 on HMS Invincible

Sea Harrier FRS.1
57 FRS1s were delivered between 1978 and 1988; most survivors converted to Sea Harrier FA.2 specifications from 1993.

Sea Harrier FRS.51
Single-seat fighter, reconnaissance and attack aircraft made for the Indian Navy, similar to the British FRS.1. Unlike the FRS1 Sea Harrier, it is fitted with Matra R550 Magic air-to-air missiles. These aircraft were later upgraded with the Elta EL/M-2032 radar and the Rafael Derby BVRAAM missiles.

Sea Harrier F(A).2
Upgrade of FRS.1 fleet in 1993, featuring the Blue Vixen Pulse-Doppler radar and the AIM-120 AMRAAM.

== McDonnell Douglas AV-8B Harrier II ==
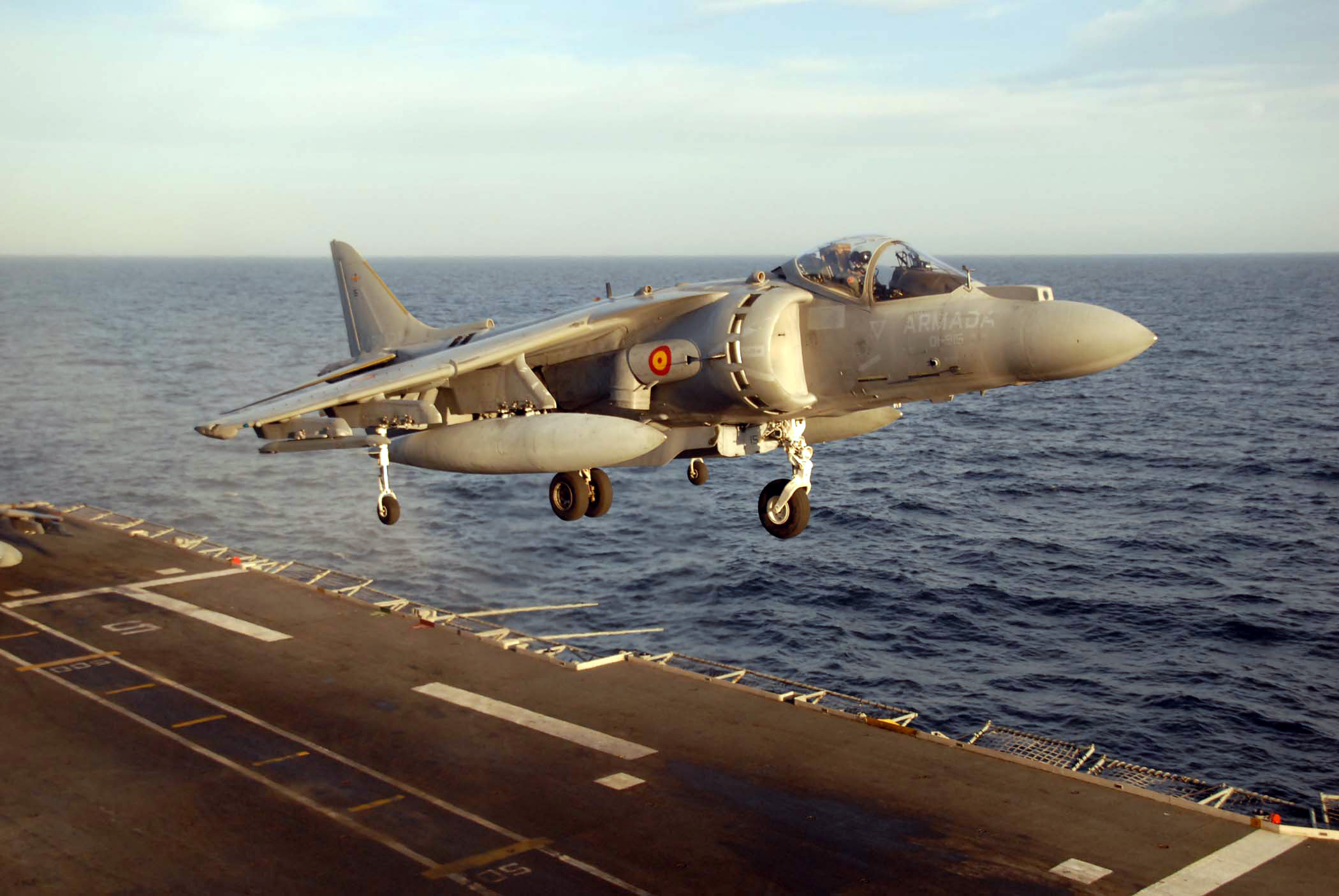
An AV-8B Harrier II Plus from the Spanish aircraft carrier Principe de Asturias prepares to land.

YAV-8B
Two prototypes converted in 1978 from existing AV-8A airframes (BuNo 158394, 158395).

AV-8B Harrier II
"Day Attack" variant. 4 full scale development (FSD) aircraft were built in 1982, followed by 162 production aircraft, built 1983–1989. Most were later upgraded to one of the following two variants, while the remainder were withdrawn from service.

AV-8B Harrier II Night Attack
Incorporates a Navigation Forward Looking Infrared camera (NAVFLIR). Upgraded cockpit, compatible with night vision goggles. More powerful Rolls-Royce Pegasus 11 engine. Originally designated AV-8D.

AV-8B Harrier II+
Similar to the Night Attack variant, with the addition of an APG-65 radar. It is used by the USMC, Spanish Navy, and Italian Navy. 72 were converted from existing AV-8B, 43 were newly built from 1993 to 1997.

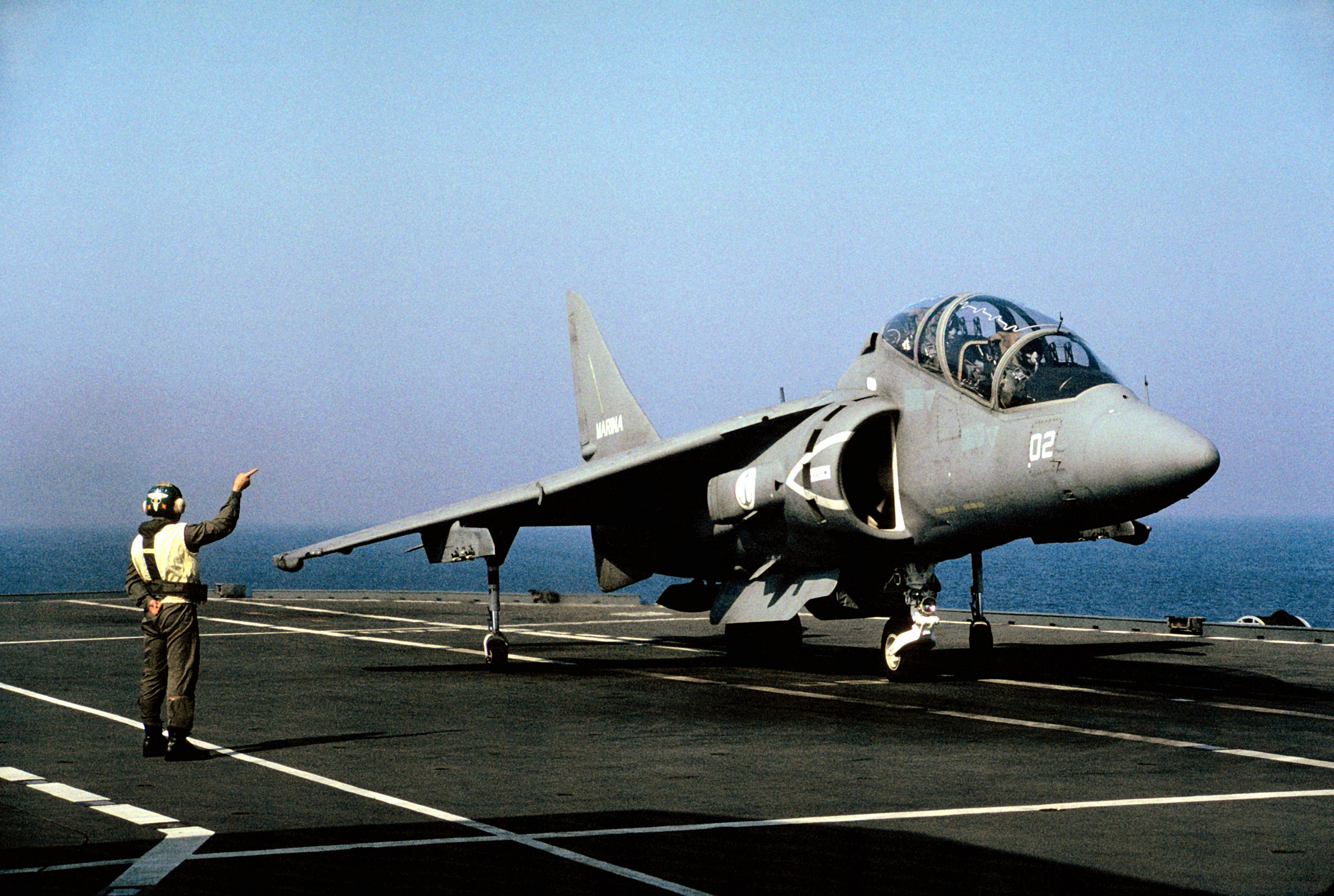
An Italian TAV-8B Harrier II aboard Giuseppe Garibaldi

TAV-8B Harrier II
Two-seat trainer version. 23 were built between 1986 and 1992.

TAV-8B Harrier II+
Two two-seat trainer aircraft built for Italy 1990 to 1991.

EAV-8B Matador II
Company designation for the Spanish Navy version. 12 were built 1987 to 1988.

EAV-8B Matador II+
AV-8B Harrier II+ for Spanish Navy, 11 were converted from EAV-8B, 8 were new built 1995 to 1997.

== British Aerospace Harrier II ==
GR.5
The GR.5 was the RAF's first second-generation Harrier. The GR.5 differed from the USMC AV-8B in avionics fit, weapons and countermeasures. Forty one GR.5s were built.

GR.5A
The GR.5A was a minor variant of the Harrier which incorporated changes in the design in anticipation of the GR.7 upgrade.

GR.7
The GR7 was an upgraded version of the Harrier GR.5.

GR.7A

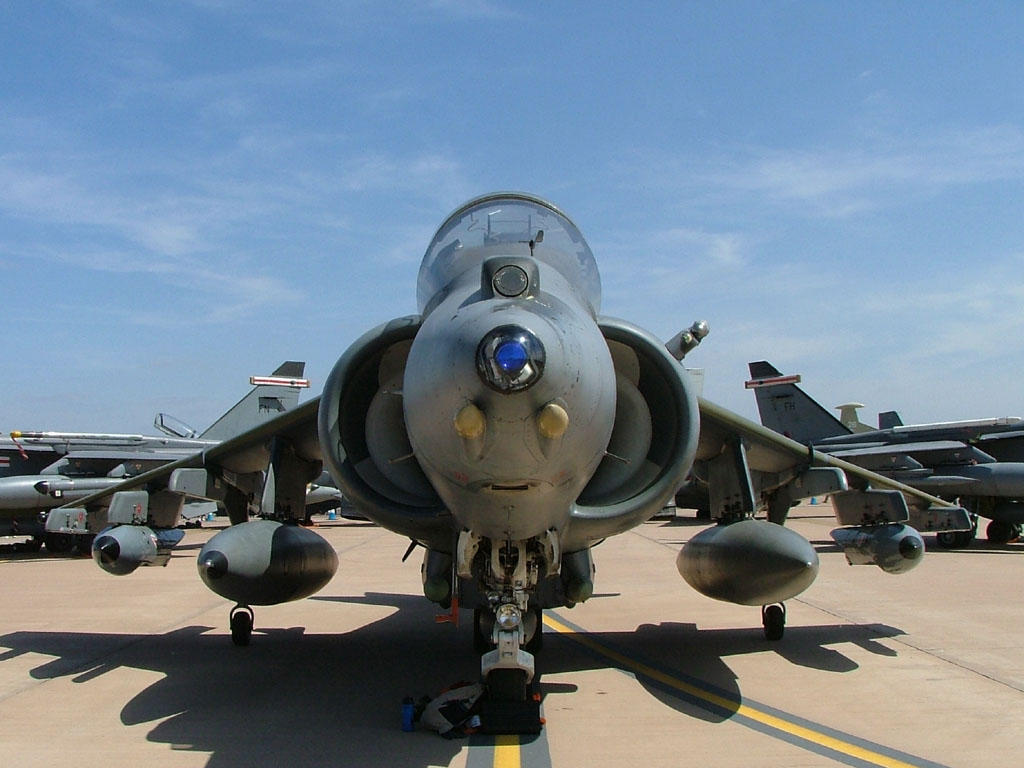
An RAF Harrier GR.7A at RIAT 2005

The GR.7A is a GR.7 with an uprated Rolls-Royce Pegasus 107 engine. The Mk 107 engine provides around 3,000 lbf (13 kN) extra thrust than the Mk 105's 21,750 lbf (98 kN) thrust, increasing aircraft performance during "hot and high" and carrier-borne operations.

GR.9
The Harrier GR.9 is an avionics and weapons upgrade of the standard GR.7.

GR.9A
The Harrier GR.9A is an avionics and weapons upgrade of the uprated engined GR.7As. All GR.9s are capable of accepting the Mk 107 Pegasus engine to become GR.9As.

T.10
The Harrier T.10 is the original two seat training variant of the second-generation RAF Harrier. The RAF used the USMC trainer, the TAV-8B, as the basis for the design.

T.12
The RAF needed trainers to reflect the upgrade of the GR.7 to GR.9. Nine T.10 aircraft were to receive the JUMP updates under the designation T.12, but retain the less powerful Pegasus 105 engine.

== See also ==
- Harrier jump jet, an overview of the Harrier family
- List of Harrier family losses
- Aircraft in fiction § Harrier family

Related development

- Hawker Siddeley P.1154
- Hawker Siddeley Harrier
- McDonnell Douglas AV-8B Harrier II
- McDonnell Douglas MiniCAS
- BAE Systems Harrier II
- British Aerospace Sea Harrier
- Hawker P.1127/Kestrel

Aircraft of comparable role, configuration, and era

- Bell X-14
- Boeing X-32
- Hunting H.126
- Lockheed Martin F-35 Lightning II
- Lockheed Martin X-35
- Ryan XV-5 Vertifan
- Rockwell XFV-12
- Short SC.1
- Yakovlev Yak-36
- Yakovlev Yak-38
- Yakovlev Yak-141

Related lists

- List of VTOL aircraft
- List of aircraft of the Fleet Air Arm
- List of attack aircraft
- List of fighter aircraft
- List of aircraft of the RAF
- List of military aircraft of the United States
- List of Harrier family losses
- List of active United States military aircraft
- List of active United Kingdom military aircraft
