= Italian Navy ranks =

The rank insignia of the Italian Navy are worn on epaulettes of shirts and white jackets, and on sleeves for navy jackets and mantels.

== Rank structure ==
=== Officers ===
NATO code	OF-10	OF-9	OF-8	OF-7	OF-6	OF-5	OF-4	OF-3	OF-2	OF-1
Role	Admirals					Senior officers			Junior officers
Italian Navy
Italian Navy		Ammiraglio	Ammiraglio di squadra	Ammiraglio di divisione	Contrammiraglio	Capitano di vascello	Capitano di fregata	Capitano di corvetta	Tenente di vascello	Sottotenente di vascello	Guardiamarina
English translation		Admiral	squadron admiral (lieutenant admiral)	divisional admiral (vice admiral)	counter admiral (rear admiral)	Ship-of-the-line captain	Frigate captain	Corvette Captain	Ship-of-the-line lieutenant	Ship-of-the-line sublieutenant	Gardemarine (Ensign)

Notes:
^{1} The rank of "ammiraglio" (admiral) is assigned to the only naval officer promoted as chief of the defense staff.

^{2} The rank of "ammiraglio di squadra con incarichi speciali" (squadron admiral with special assignments) is assigned to the naval officer promoted as chief of the naval staff and/or as secretary of defense.

=== Student officer ranks ===
Rank group	Student officer
Italian Navy
Italian Navy	Aspirante guardiamarina

=== Non-commissioned officers and ratings ===
NATO code	OR-9			OR-8	OR-7		OR-6	OR-5	OR-4	OR-3	OR-2	OR-1
Role	Marshals				Sergeants				Permanent service volunteers	Temporary service volunteers
Italian Navy				Capo di prima classe / Capo di seconda classe / Capo di terza classe					Sottocapo aiutante / Sottocapo scelto / Sottocapo di prima classe / Sottocapo di seconda classe / Sottocapo di terza classe			No insignia
Italian Navy	Primo luogotenente	Luogotenente	Primo maresciallo	Capo di prima classe / Capo di seconda classe / Capo di terza classe	Secondo aiutante	Secondo capo scelto	Secondo capo	Sergente	Sottocapo aiutante / Sottocapo scelto / Sottocapo di prima classe / Sottocapo di seconda classe / Sottocapo di terza classe	Comune scelto	Comune di prima classe	Comune di seconda classe
English rank name translation	First sub-lieutenant	Sub-lieutenant	First marshal	Chief 1st class / Chief 2nd class / Chief 3rd class	Second chief adjutant	Chosen second chief	Second chief	Sergeant	Subchief adjutant / Chosen subchief / Subchief 1st class / Subchief 2nd class / Subchief 3rd class	Chosen commoner	Commoner 1st class	Commoner 2nd class

Notes:
^{1}No rank insignia, sailors just wear category or specialty badge, in this case the rating of "tecnico di macchine" (machinist's mate).

== History ==
=== Enlisted ranks introduced in 1995 ===
NATO code	OR-7	OR-4
Shoulder board
Italian	Secondo capo scelto	Sottocapo di prima classe scelto	Sottocapo di prima classe	Sottocapo di seconda classe	Sottocapo di terza classe
English	Chosen second chief	Chosen subchief first class	Subchief first class	Subchief second class	Subchief third class

=== Enlisted ranks introduced in 2018 ===
NATO code	OR-9	OR-7	OR-4
Shoulder board
Italian	Primo luogotenente q.s. (Note: q.s. - (qualifica speciale - special rank))	Secondo capo scelto q.s.	Sottocapo di prima casse scelto q.s.
English	First sub-lieutenant (special class)	Chosen second chief (special class)	Chosen subchief first class (special class)

=== Enlisted name changes in 2022 ===
On 5 August 2022 multiple ranks across the armed forces were renamed.

NATO code	OR-9	OR-7	OR-4		OR-3
Insignia
(2018–2022)	Primo luogotenente q.s.	Secondo capo scelto q.s.	Sottocapo di prima classe scelto q.s.	Sottocapo di prima classe scelto	Sottocapo
(2022–Present)	Primo luogotenente	Secondo aiutante	Sottocapo aiutante	Sottocapo scelto	Comune scelto

== Bibliography ==
- Decreto legislativo 15 marzo 2010 n.66
- "Riordino delle carriere del 27/02/2018" (PDF). Archived from the original (PDF) on 2018-07-03.

== See also ==
- Italian Army ranks
- Italian Air Force ranks
