= Italian battleship Benedetto Brin =

Pre-dreadnought battleship of the Italian Royal Navy

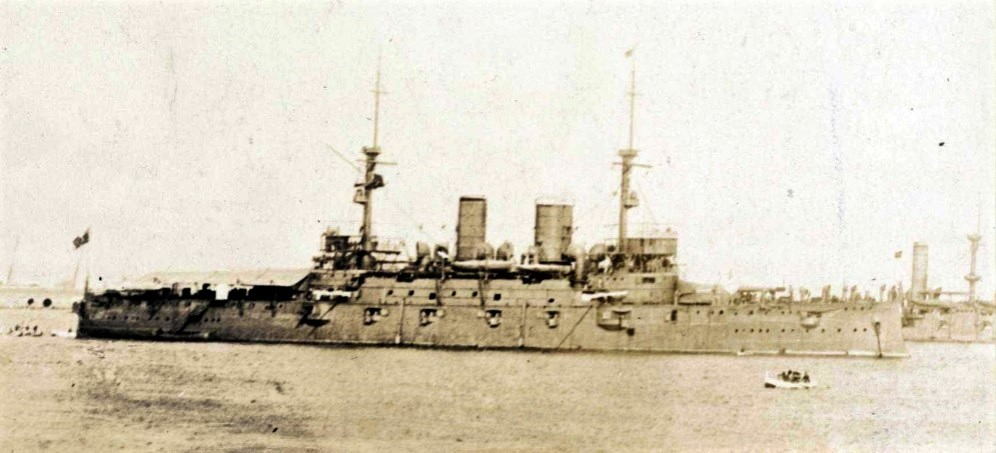
- Benedetto Brin

History

Italy
- Name: Benedetto Brin
- Namesake: Benedetto Brin
- Operator: Regia Marina
- Builder: Regio Cantiere di Castellammare di Stabia
- Laid down: 30 January 1899
- Launched: 7 November 1901
- Completed: 1 September 1905
- Fate: Destroyed by explosion 27 September 1915

General characteristics
- Type: Regina Margherita-class battleship
- Displacement: Normal: 13,215 long tons (13,427 t); Full load: 14,737 long tons (14,973 t)
- Length: 138.65 m (454 ft 11 in)
- Beam: 23.84 m (78 ft 3 in)
- Draft: 9 m (29 ft 6 in)
- Installed power: 28 × Belleville boilers; 20,475 ihp (15,268 kW)
- Propulsion: 2 × triple-expansion steam engines; 2 × screw propellers
- Speed: 20 knots (37 km/h; 23 mph)
- Range: 10,000 nmi (18,520 km; 11,508 mi) at 10 kn (19 km/h; 12 mph)
- Complement: 812–900
- Armament: 4 × 305 mm (12 in)/40 guns; 4 × 203 mm (8 in)/45 guns; 12 × 152 mm (6 in)/40 guns; 20 × 76 mm (3 in)/40 guns; 2 × 47 mm (1.9 in)/40 guns; 2 × 37 mm (1.5 in)/40 guns; 4 × 450 mm (17.7 in) torpedo tubes
- Armor: Belt and side: 152 mm; Deck: 79 mm (3.1 in); Turrets: 203 mm; Conning tower: 152 mm; Casemates: 152 mm

Benedetto Brin was the second and final member of the Regina Margherita class of pre-dreadnought battleships built for the Italian Regia Marina between 1899 and 1905. She was armed with a main battery of four 305 mm (12 in) guns and had a top speed of 20 knots (37 km/h; 23 mph).

Benedetto Brin was assigned to the Mediterranean Squadron after she entered service in late 1905. In her early career, she took part in routine training exercises with the rest of the squadron. saw combat in the Italo-Turkish War of 1911–1912, including the bombardment of Tripoli in October 1911. In May 1915, Italy entered World War I; Benedetteo Brin had been reduced to a training ship by this time, and she saw no combat. She was destroyed by an internal explosion in September 1915, which killed over 450 of the ship's crew.

== Design ==
Plan and profile drawing of the Regina Margherita class

Benedetto Brin was 138.65 meters (454 ft 11 in) long overall and had a beam of 23.84 m (78 ft 3 in) and a draft of 9 m (29 ft 6 in). She displaced 13,215 long tons (13,427 t) normally and up to 14,737 long tons (14,973 t) at full load. The ship had a flush deck and an inverted bow with a ram below the waterline. Benedetto Brin had a crew that varied between 812 and 900 officers and enlisted men.

Her propulsion system consisted of two triple expansion steam engines that drove a pair of screw propellers. Steam for the engines was provided by twenty-eight coal-fired Belleville boilers, which were vented into three funnels, two of which were placed side by side. The ship's propulsion system provided a top speed of 20 knots (37 km/h; 23 mph) from 20,475 indicated horsepower (15,268 kW), and a range of approximately 10,000 nautical miles (19,000 km; 12,000 mi) at 10 knots (19 km/h; 12 mph).

As built, the ship was armed with a main battery of four 305 mm (12 in) 40-caliber guns placed in two twin gun turrets, one forward and one aft. The ship was also equipped with a secondary battery of four 203 mm (8 in) 40-cal. guns in casemates in the superstructure, and twelve 152 mm (6 in) 40-cal. guns, also in casemates in the side of the hull. Close-range defense against torpedo boats was provided by a battery of twenty 76 mm (3 in) 40-cal. guns. The ship also carried a pair of 47 mm (1.9 in) guns, two 37 mm (1.5 in) guns, and two 10 mm (0.4 in) Maxim guns. Benedetto Brin was also equipped with four 450 mm (18 in) torpedo tubes placed in the hull below the waterline.

The ship was protected with Harvey steel manufactured in Terni. The main belt was 152 mm thick, and the deck was 79 mm (3.1 in) thick. The conning tower and the casemate guns were also protected by 152 mm of armor plating. The main battery guns had stronger armor protection, at 203 mm thick.

== Service ==
The ship was built by the Castellammare di Stabia shipyard. Her keel was laid down on 30 January 1899, and the completed hull was launched on 7 November 1901 in the presence of the King and Queen of Italy, government officials, and the whole Italian Mediterranean squadron. Fitting out work lasted for the next four years, and she was completed on 1 September 1905. It took so long primarily because of non-delivery of material, particularly the heavy armor. After she entered active service, the ship was assigned to the Mediterranean Squadron. The Squadron was usually only activated for seven months of the year in peacetime, which was occupied with training maneuvers, and the rest of the year the ships were placed in reserve. In 1907, the Mediterranean Squadron consisted of Benedetto Brin, her sister Regina Margherita, and three of the Regina Elena-class battleships. The ships participated in the annual maneuvers in late September and early October, under the command of Vice Admiral Alfonso di Brocchetti. Benedetto Brin remained in the active duty squadron through 1910, by which time the fourth Regina Elena-class ship was completed, bringing the total number of front-line battleships to six. (Note: These were all pre-dreadnought battleships, and were thus obsolescent by this period, but Italy's first dreadnought, Dante Alighieri, did not enter service until 1913.)

=== Italo-Turkish War ===
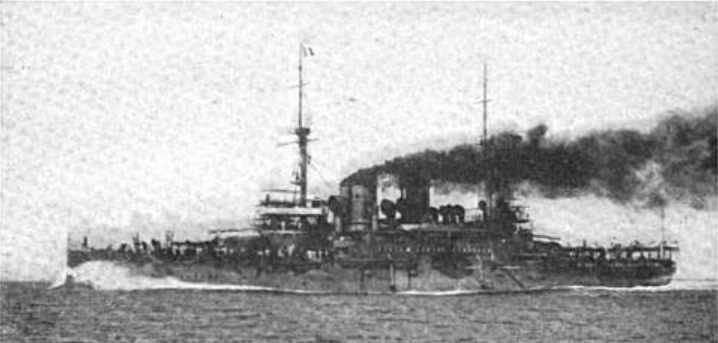
Benedetto Brin steaming at high speed

On 29 September 1911, Italy declared war on the Ottoman Empire in order to seize Libya. During the Italo-Turkish War Benedetto Brin was assigned to the 1st Division of the 2nd Squadron, along with her sister and the two Ammiraglio di Saint Bon-class battleships. Benedetto Brin served as the squadron flagship of Vice Admiral Farvelli. In early October, she arrived off Tripoli to relieve Roma on blockade duty outside the port. On 3–4 October, she participated in the bombardment of the fortifications protecting Tripoli. The Italian fleet used their medium-caliber guns to preserve their ammunition for the heavy guns. Turkish counter-battery fire was completely ineffective.

On 13 April 1912, Benedetto Brin and the rest of the Squadron sailed from Tobruk to the Aegean Sea to rendezvous with the 1st Squadron. The two squadrons met off Stampalia on 17 April. The next day, the fleet steamed into the northern Aegean and cut several Turkish submarine telegraph cables. Most of the ships of the Italian fleet then bombarded the fortresses protecting the Dardanelles in an unsuccessful attempt to lure out the Turkish fleet. While they were doing this, Regina Margherita, Benedetto Brin, and two torpedo boats were detached to cut additional cables between Rhodes and Marmaris. In July, Benedetto Brin and the rest of the division had withdrawn to Italy to replace worn-out gun barrels, along with other repairs. Also in 1912, the ship had four 3-inch guns added, increasing her battery from 20 to 24 pieces.

=== World War I ===
Italy declared neutrality after the outbreak of World War I in August 1914, but by April 1915, the Triple Entente had convinced the Italians to enter the war against the Central Powers which it did in May. The primary naval opponent for the duration of the war was the Austro-Hungarian Navy; the Naval Chief of Staff, Admiral Paolo Thaon di Revel, planned a distant blockade with the battle fleet, while smaller vessels, such as the MAS boats conducted raids. The heavy ships of the Italian fleet would be preserved for a potential major battle should the Austro-Hungarian fleet emerge from its bases. As a result, the ship's career during the war was limited. In addition to the cautious Italian strategy, Benedetto Brin—long-since obsolescent—was reduced to a training ship in the 3rd Division, along with her sister ship. On 27 September 1915, Benedetto Brin was destroyed in a huge explosion in the harbor of Brindisi. At the time, the explosion was believed to have been the result of Austro-Hungarian sabotage. The Italian Navy now believes the explosion to have been accidental. A total of 8 officers and 379 enlisted men survived but 454 members of the crew, including Rear Admiral Ernesto Rubin de Cervin died. Two of the ship's 12-inch guns (those in the frontal gun turret) were salvaged from the wreck and were reused as coastal guns protecting Venice.
