= Squadron admiral =

Senior naval flag officer rank

Squadron admiral and squadron vice-admiral are senior naval flag officer ranks, usually equivalent to vice admiral in Anglophone countries. A squadron admiral or squadron vice-admiral is typically senior to a vice admiral and junior to an admiral.

== Squadron admiral ==
Squadron admiral is commissioned officer rank used the navies of Brazil and Italy.

=== Brazil ===
Squadron admiral (Almirante de esquadra) is a rank used by the Brazilian Navy. It ranks directly above the vice admiral and immediately below an admiral. It is equivalent to an army general in the Brazilian Army and lieutenant brigadier of air in the Brazilian Air Force.

=== Italy ===
Squadron admiral (Ammiraglio di squadra) is a rank used by the Italian Navy. It ranks directly above the divisional admiral and immediately below a squadron admiral with special assignments. It is equivalent to an army corps general in the Italian Army and air squadron general in the Italian Air Force.

When appointed to the Chief of the Defence Staff, squadron admirals will be given the rank of squadron admiral with special assignments (ammiraglio di squadra con incarichi speciali).

=== Colombia ===
In Colombia, squadron admiral (Almirante de escuadra) was used by the Colombian Navy. It ranks directly above vice admiral immediately below an admiral. It was equivalent to lieutenant general in the Colombian Army and lieutenant general of the air in the Colombian Air Force, but these ranks abolished in 2010.

=== Users ===
Almirante de esquadra
(Brazilian Navy)

Ammiraglio di squadra con incarichi speciali
(Italian Navy)

Ammiraglio di squadra
(Italian Navy)

== Squadron vice-admiral ==
Squadron vice-admiral Vice-amiral d'escadre
- Pennant of a French Squadron vice-admiral

- French shoulder and sleeve insignia
- Service branch: Navy
- Abbreviation: VAE
- Rank group: Flag officer
- NATO rank code: OF-8
- Next higher rank: Amiral
- Next lower rank: Vice-amiral
- Equivalent ranks: Général de corps d'armé

Squadron vice-admiral (French: Vice-amiral d'escadre) is a naval rank found in navies of the world which follow the French tradition of naval ranks. The squadron vice-admiral leads a squadron and is typically senior to a vice-admiral and junior to an admiral.

This translation is not often used in practice, as the rank is usually kept in the original language or rendered as vice-admiral. The main navy to use the rank of squadron vice-admiral is the French Navy, where it is a three-star rank with a NATO code of OF-8, equivalent to Army corps general or lieutenant general in seniority. Officially, it is not a rank, but a style and position (French: rang et appelation) bestowed upon some vice-admiral (which is the highest actual substantive rank and is a two-star rank with NATO code OF-7 equivalent to rear admiral (upper half) or major general).

=== Users ===
Vice-amiral d'escadre
(Benin Navy)

Vice-amiral d'escadre
(Cameroon Navy)

Vice-amiral d'escadre
(Congolese Navy)

Vice-amiral d'escadre
(French Navy)

Vice-amiral d'escadre
(Gabonese Navy)

Vice-amiral d'escadre
(Navy of Ivory Coast)

Vice-amiral d'escadre
(Madagascar Navy)

Vice-amiral d'escadre
(Royal Moroccan Navy)
