= Divisional admiral =

Divisional admiral is a commissioned officer rank used in the navies of Belgium and Italy.

It is rated OF-7 within the NATO ranking system and is equivalent to rear admiral in the Royal Navy and rear admiral (upper half) in the United States Navy.

== Belgium ==
Divisional admiral (Flemish: Divisieadmiraal; French: Amiral de division; German: Divisionsadmiral) is a rank used by the Belgian Naval Component. It ranks directly above a flotilla admiral and immediately below a vice-admiral. It is equivalent to a major general in the Belgian Land Component, Air Component and Medical Component.

== Italy ==
Divisional admiral Ammiraglio di divisione
- Rank flag

- Shoulder and sleeve insignia
- Country: Italy
- Service branch: Italian Navy
- Formation: 1926
- Next higher rank: Squadron admiral
- Next lower rank: Counter admiral
- Equivalent ranks: Divisional general

Divisional admiral (Italian: Ammiraglio di divisione) is a rank used by the Italian Navy. It ranks directly above a counter admiral and immediately below a squadron admiral. It is equivalents to divisional general the Italian Army and the Air Force. In addition, another designation is vice admiral just like the vice-amiral of the French Navy.

== See also ==
- Divisional General
- Division (naval)
