= Italian aircraft carrier Giuseppe Garibaldi =

Italian aircraft carrier

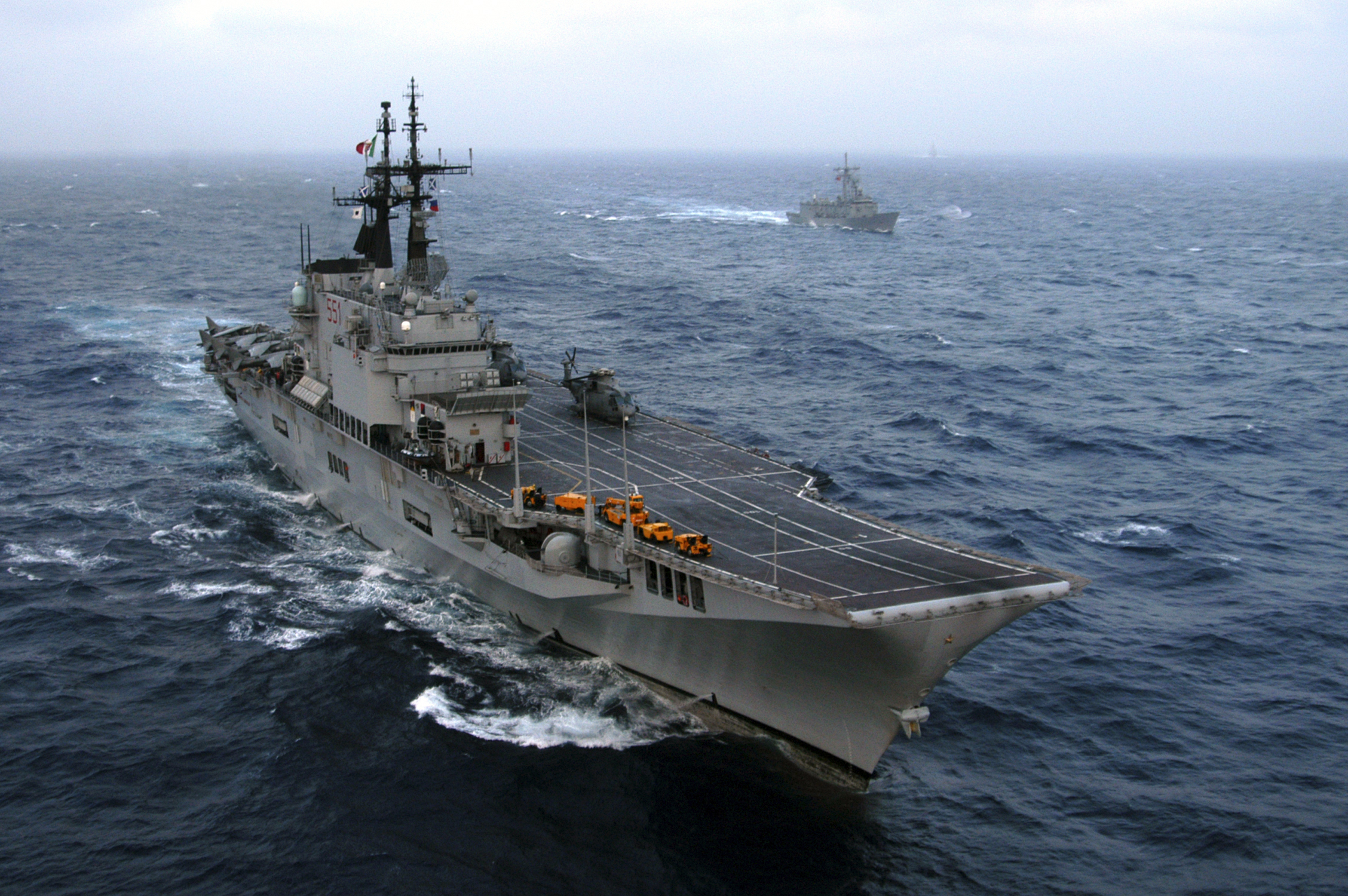
- Giuseppe Garibaldi in 2004

History

Italy
- Name: Giuseppe Garibaldi
- Namesake: Giuseppe Garibaldi
- Builder: Fincantieri, Monafalcone Shipyard, Monfalcone (Gorizia)
- Cost: Lire 428 billion (1981) (equivalent to €903.63 million in 2019)
- Laid down: 26 March 1981
- Launched: 11 June 1983
- Commissioned: 30 September 1985
- Decommissioned: 1 October 2024
- Home port: Taranto
- Identification: Pennant number: 551
- Motto: Obbedisco ("I Obey")
- Status: Retired, transferred to the Indonesian Navy as KRI Sriwijaya

General characteristics
- Type: ASW aircraft cruiser/aircraft carrier
- Displacement: - 10,100 t (9,900 long tons) (standard); - 13,850 t (13,630 long tons) (full load); - 14,150 t (13,930 long tons) (full load, after 2003 MLU)
- Length: 180.2 m (591 ft)
- Beam: 33.4 m (110 ft)
- Draught: 8.2 m (27 ft)
- Propulsion: - 4 × General Electric/Avio LM2500 gas turbines, 60,400 kW (81,000 hp); - 6 × diesel engine generators Grandi Motori Trieste B230/12, 9,360 kW (12,550 hp) with electric generator Ansaldo-Elettrital, 1,560 kW (2,090 hp) each
- Speed: 30 kn (56 km/h; 35 mph)+
- Range: 7,000 nmi (13,000 km; 8,100 mi) at 20 kn (37 km/h; 23 mph)
- Complement: - 830, of which: 550 Crew; up to 180 for Fleet Air Arm; up to 100 C^{4} staff
- Sensors & processing systems: - Selenia MM/SPS-768 (RAN 3L) long-range radar; - Selenia SPS-774 (RAN-10S) early warning radar; - Hughes AN/SPS-52C early warning, E band radar; - Selenia SPS-702 CORA surface search radar; - 2 × GEM Elettronica SPN-749 navigation radar; - Selenia SPN-728 approach radar; - 3 × Selenia RTN-30X fire control radar, for Albatross/Aspide; - 3 × Selenia RTN-20X fire control radar, for CIWS 40/70 mm; - Raytheon DE 1160 LF hull sonar (replaced by WASS DMS-2000 in 2003); - Selenia CMS SADOC-3; - TACAN Face Standard URN-25
- Electronic warfare & decoys: - Elettronica Spa SLQ-732 jamming system; - 2 × OTO Melara SCLAR decoy launcher; - AN/SLQ-25 Nixie towed torpedo decoy
- Armament: 2 × Mk.29 octuple launcher for Sea Sparrow/Selenia Aspide SAM; 3 × Oto Melara Twin 40L70 DARDO; 2 × 324 mm triple torpedo tubes; 4 × Otomat Mk 2 SSMs (removed in 2003)
- Aircraft carried: up to 18; AV-8B Harrier II fighter/bombers; Augusta SH-3D or AgustaWestland AW101 helicopters (ASW, ASH and AEW)
- Notes: flight deck is length 174.0 m (570.9 ft) and 30.0 m (98.4 ft) wide

Giuseppe Garibaldi was an Italian aircraft carrier, the first through-deck aviation ship ever built for the Italian Navy, and the first Italian ship built to operate fixed-wing aircraft. Although she was widely recognised as a carrier first and foremost, she was officially designated as an aircraft-carrying cruiser.

The ship was equipped with short take-off and vertical landing (STOVL) aircraft and helicopters. Giuseppe Garibaldi was involved in combat air operations off Somalia, Kosovo, Afghanistan and Libya.

She is now in commission with the Indonesian Navy as KRI Sriwijaya.

== Design ==
Giuseppe Garibaldi's deck layout

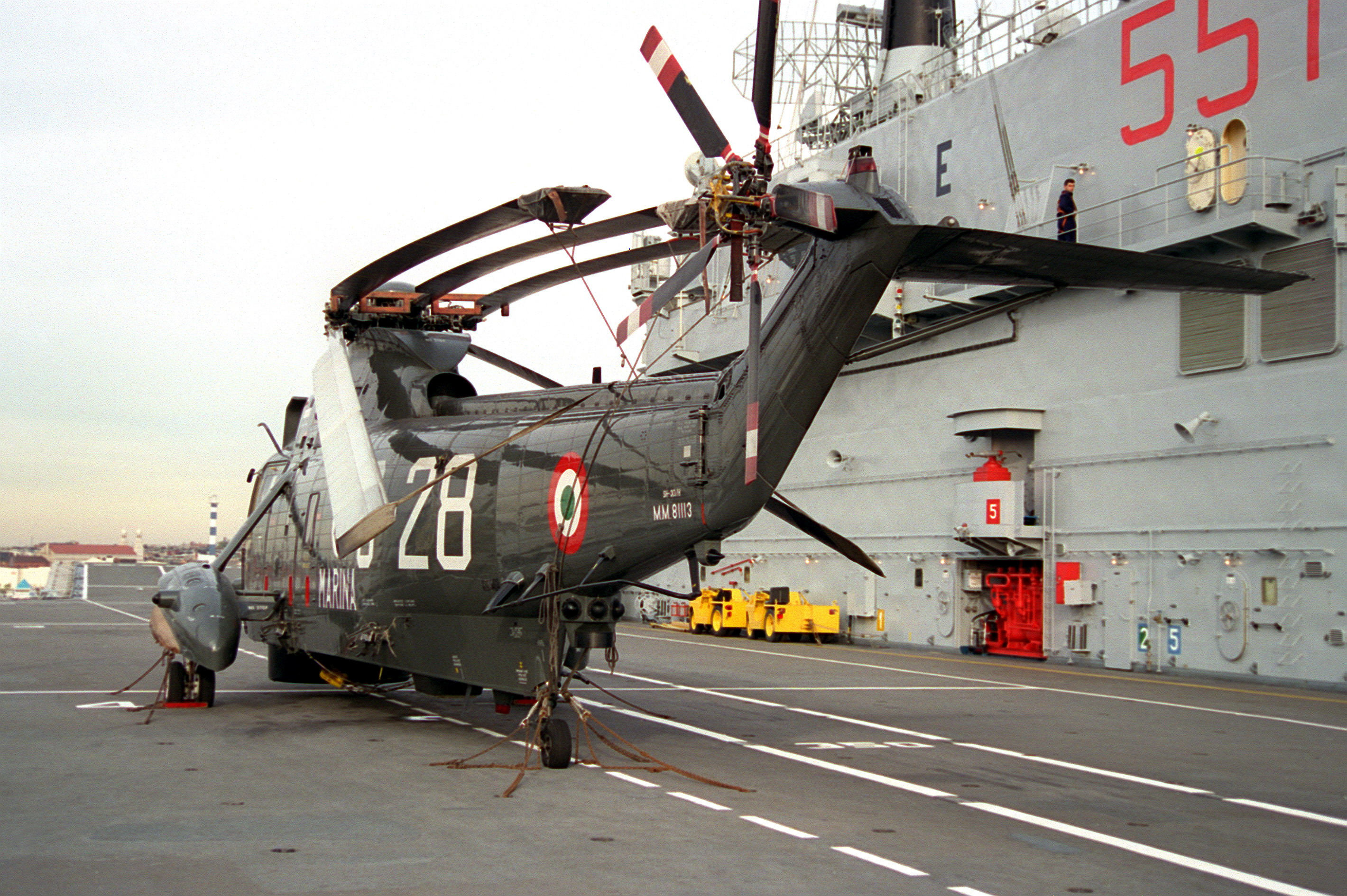
SH-3 Sea King on deck

The ship was powered by four Fiat COGAG gas turbines built under license from GE, offering a sustained power of 81,000 hp (60 MW). Driving two shafts the ship had a maximum speed of 30 knots (56 km/h; 35 mph) and could travel for 7,000 nautical miles (13,000 km; 8,100 mi) at around 20 knots (37 km/h; 23 mph).

The ship was equipped with four Otomat Mk2 short range surface-to-surface missile system installed at the stern of the vessel (removed in 2003 to improve the flight deck and satellite communications) and two ILAS three triple tube torpedo launchers. Defences was provided by two eight-cell SAM launchers firing the SARH Aspide missile, and three Oto Melara Twin 40L70 DARDO close in weapon system.

The ship also had several countermeasures, including two SCLAR twenty-barrel launchers for chaff, decoy, flares, or jammers, the SLQ-25 Nixie and SLAT anti-torpedo systems and ECM systems.

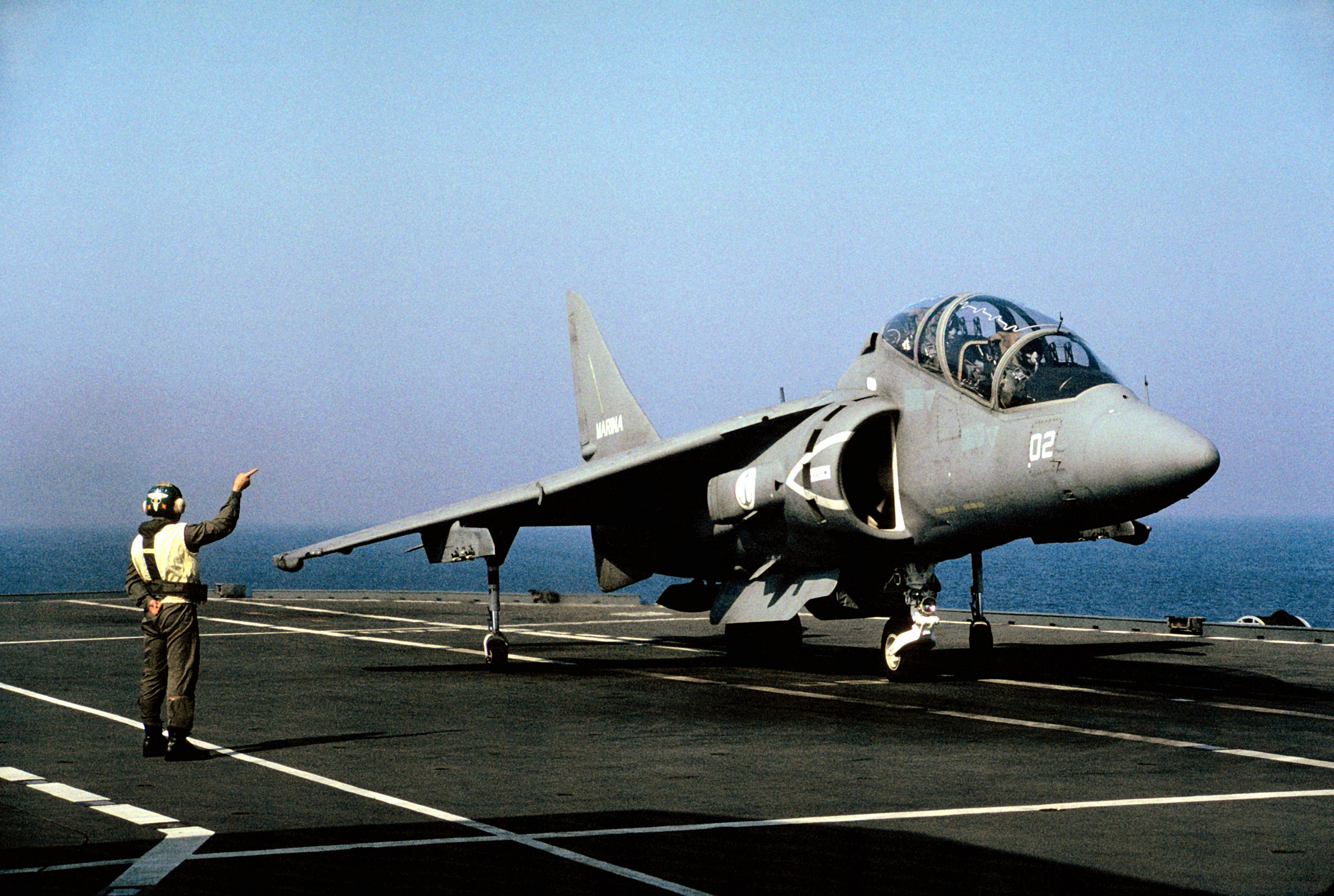
A Marina Militare TAV-8B Harrier II aboard Giuseppe Garibaldi

The air arm consisted of a maximum of sixteen AV-8B Harrier IIs and two search and rescue helicopters, or eighteen Agusta helicopters or a mix of helicopters and fighters. The flight deck had the characteristic off-axis design with a 6.5-degree ski-jump for STOL aircraft; it was 174 m (571 ft) long and 30.4 m (100 ft) wide.

A 1937 law gave control of all national fixed-wing air assets to the Italian Air Force, and the navy was only permitted to operate helicopters. At the time of the ship's commissioning of Garibaldi, the Italian Naval Aviation did not receive her Harriers, so it was reclassified as an Incrociatore portaeromobili (Italian: "aircraft carrying cruiser"). Until 1988 only Italian helicopters landed on her deck, as well as Royal Navy Sea Harriers during NATO joint maneuvers. The ban on fixed-wing aircraft was lifted in 1989, and the Italian Navy acquired Harrier II fighters to fly from the Giuseppe Garibaldi.

The ship underwent a modernization in 2003 and a major restructuring in 2013.

== Construction ==
The Giuseppe Garibaldi was the fourth ship of the Italian Navy to be named after the 19th-century Italian General Giuseppe Garibaldi. All four ships, including the missile cruiser, together with an image of Garibaldi, were depicted in the crest.

Built by Fincantieri (Italcantieri) at the Monfalcone shipyards on the Gulf of Trieste, it was laid down on 26 March 1981, launched on 11 June 1983, and commissioned on 30 September 1985.

== Career ==
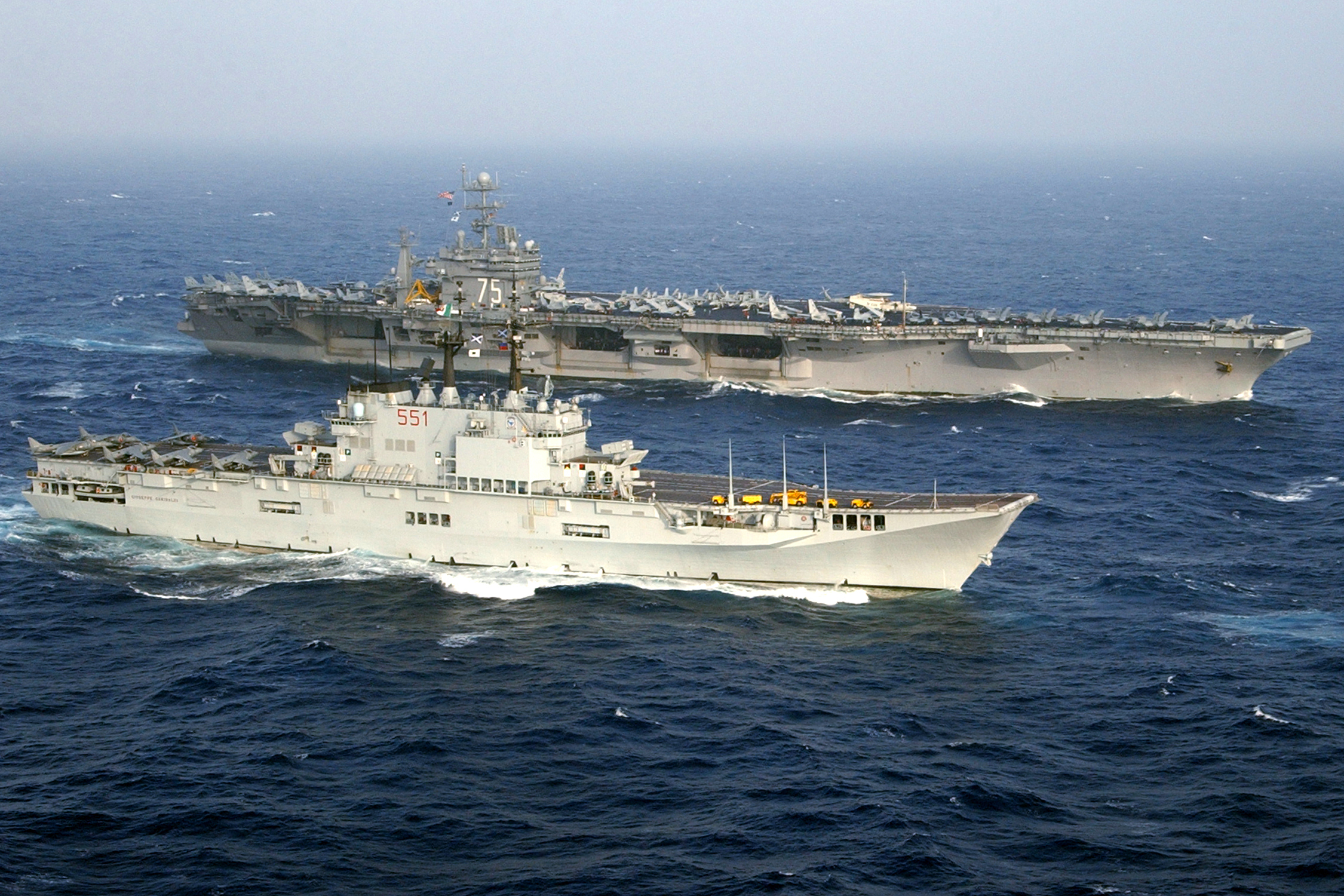
Giuseppe Garibaldi and the US aircraft carrier USS Harry S. Truman operate near each other in the Atlantic Ocean while participating in Majestic Eagle 2004, a multinational war exercise conducted off the coast of Morocco

Garibaldi was classed as an anti-submarine warfare carrier (ASW), and was based in Taranto.

In 1999 with the Kosovo War in the Balkans, Italy committed Harrier AV-8B II+ fighters embarked aboard Giuseppe Garibaldi from 13 May to early June 1999. The planes carried out 30 sorties in 63 hours of flight. The aircraft used Mk 82 GBU-16 bombs and AGM-65 Maverick missiles. The Italian naval force, in addition to the aircraft carrier Giuseppe Garibaldi with her air group, included the Maestrale-class frigate Zeffiro.

Following the attacks of 11 September 2001 and the war on terror declared by U.S. President Bush, Italy participated in Operation Enduring Freedom in Afghanistan. Giuseppe Garibaldi was engaged as the command ship of GRUPNAVIT I, 1 Italian Naval Group, which also included Zeffiro, the patrol team and the airman supplier in Etna. The group set sail from Taranto on 18 November 2001. They trained in the Indian Ocean from 3 December 2001 to 1 March 2002 and returned to Taranto on 18 March 2002. During the mission, the AV-8B Harrier unit carried out 288 missions for a total of 860 hours of flight. Tasks carried out included interception/interdiction, sea and air support, and aircraft interdiction in Afghanistan.

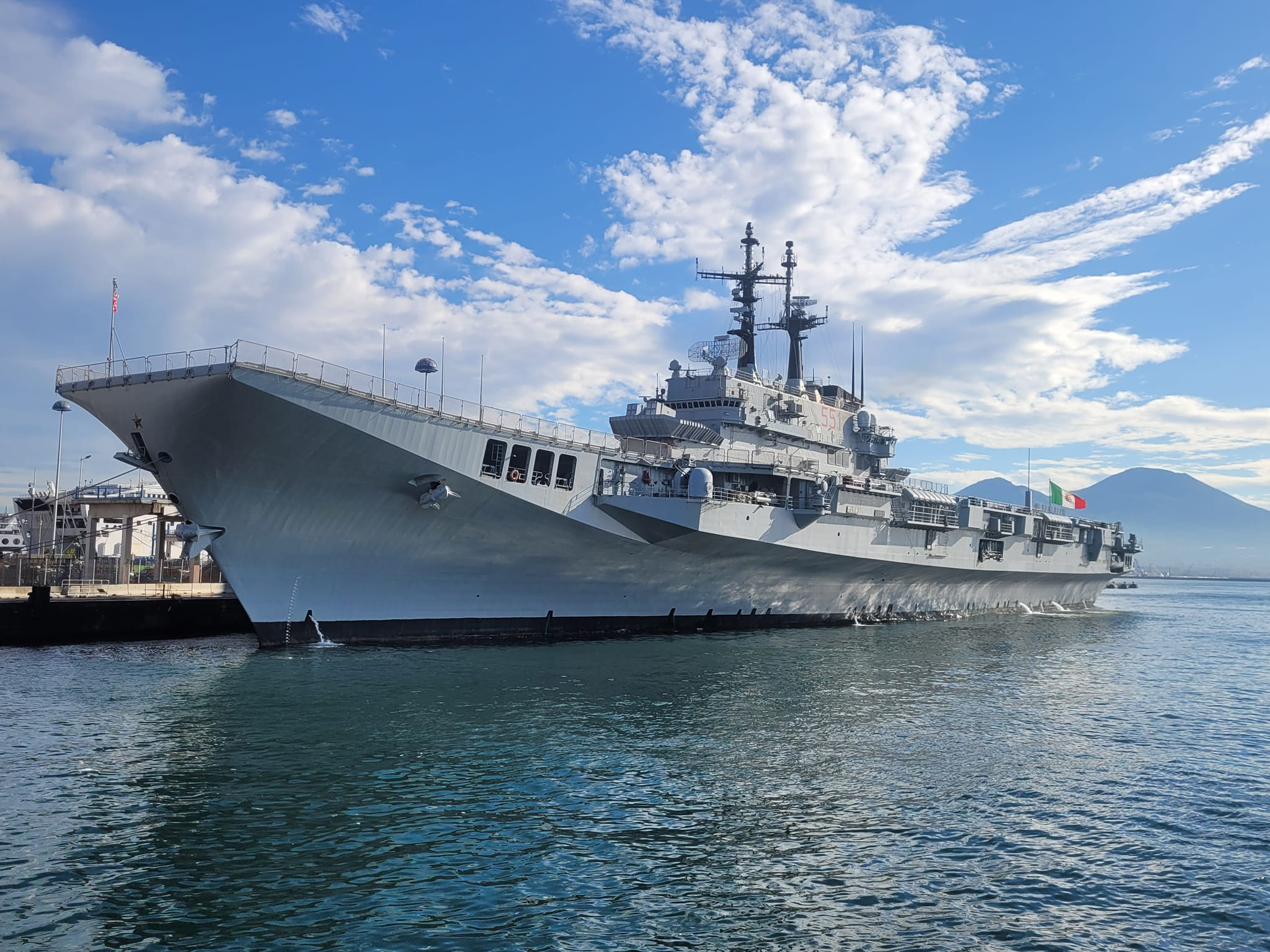
Giuseppe Garibaldi anchored in Naples in October 2024

In 2009 Giuseppe Garibaldi was replaced as the flagship of the Italian Navy by the new and larger carrier Cavour.

Participating in the 2011 military intervention in Libya after the transfer of authority to NATO and the decision to participate in strike air-ground operations, the Italian government assigned under NATO command four Italian Navy AV-8B plus (from Garibaldi) in addition to Italian air force aircraft. As of 24 March, the Italian Navy was engaged in Operation Unified Protector with the light aircraft carrier Garibaldi, the Maestrale-class frigate Libeccio and the auxiliary ship Etna. Additionally the Orizzonte-class frigate Andrea Doria and Maestrale-class frigate Euro were patrolling off the Sicilian coast in an air-defence role. In total, until the end of the mission in Libya, the eight Italian Navy AV-8Bs flying from the carrier Giuseppe Garibaldi dropped 160 guided bombs during 1221 flight hours.

The ship was retired in 2024 and replaced by the LHD Trieste.

== Indonesian sale ==
In March 2025, it was stated that the Indonesian Navy was interested in acquiring the ship from Italy, along with her airwing of Harrier II jets. Fincantieri presented a proposal to the Indonesian Navy in July 2025 to convert Giuseppe Garibaldi into a helicopter and UAV assault ship. In September 2025, the Chief of Staff of the Indonesian Navy Admiral Muhammad Ali stated that the acquisition of Giuseppe Garibaldi is still being discussed with the Italian side.

As of 17 February 2026, negotiations remained ongoing between the Indonesia and Italy navies and Fincantieri, with the ship set to be transferred as a grant. On 10 March, a Senate Foreign Affairs and Defence Committee (Commissione Affari esteri e difesa del Senato) vote for the transfer of Giuseppe Garibaldi was delayed by the opposition Five Star Movement (M5S) and Democratic Party (PD). M5S members also asked if the ship could be sold rather than gifted for free to the Indonesian Navy. On 24 March, speaking in front of the Committee, Admiral Giacinto Ottaviani said that maintenance and scrapping costs made the transfer of the ship for free the "most convenient solution" (soluzione più conveniente). The draft decree for a vote was approved by the Committee the same day, and forwarded to the Committees of the Chamber (Commissioni competenti della Camera).

Representatives of M5S, PD and Italia Viva (IV) indicated that their parties would vote to oppose the transfer, while Brothers of Italy (FdI) and Lega (LSP) representatives expressed a favourable opinion. On 28 April 2026, the transfer was approved.

On 20 July, at a meeting of the First Commission of the House of Representatives of Indonesia, Air Vice Marshal Haris Haryanto, the Director General of Defense Power of the Ministry of Defense, confirmed that the former Giuseppe Garibaldi is expected to arrive in Indonesia on 20 September 2026. The Indonesian House of Representatives also approved the transfer of the aircraft carrier in an open parliamentary forum. The decision was made after the Ministry of Defense requested approval for transfer of the ship to Indonesia at a cost of €54 million. The forum also explained that the construction of the Ratai Bay Naval Base in Lampung is expected to be completed before the ship's arrival and its inauguration at the Indonesian National Armed Forces Anniversary on 5 October 2026.

The former Giuseppe Garibaldi departed Taranto for Indonesia in the evening of 24 August. The Indonesian Navy announced that the ship will be named Sriwijaya. The Italian flag aboard the ship was lowered for the last time on 24 September 2026 and the ship was commissioned into the Indonesian Navy. The ship's full name is KRI Sriwijaya (100).

== See also ==
- Italian Naval Aviation
- Italian aircraft carrier Cavour
- Italian landing helicopter dock Trieste
- List of naval ship classes in service
