= Commander in Chief Naval Fleet =

- Il Comando in Capo della Squadra Navale
- Active: 1952 to date
- Country: Italy
- Branch: Italian Navy
- Part of: Italian Navy

Commanders
- Current commander: Aurelio De Carolis

Aircraft flown
- Attack: Boeing AV-8B Harrier II
- Fighter: Lockheed Martin F-35 Lightning II
- Multirole helicopter: NHIndustries NH90
- Utility helicopter: AgustaWestland EH101
- Piaggio P.180 Avanti

The Commander in Chief Naval Fleet (Italian: Comandante in Capo della Squadra Navale) (CINCNAV) is a post in the Italian Navy that is responsible for the operational aspects of the Italian Navy, including ships, submarines and aircraft. The post was established in 1952 and since 1972 has been based in Santa Rosa near Rome.
