= Italian Navy =

Maritime warfare branch of Italy's military

- Marina Militare
- Coat of arms of the Italian Navy, displaying the coats of arms of former Italian maritime republics (clockwise from top left: Venice, Genoa, Pisa and Amalfi)
- Founded: 1861 as Regia Marina (official); 1946 as Marina Militare
- Country: Italy
- Type: Navy
- Role: Naval warfare
- Size: 29,300 personnel 184 vessels (incl. minor auxiliaries); 70 aircraft
- Part of: Italian Armed Forces
- Mottos: Italian: Patria e Onore "Motherland and Honour"
- March: La Ritirata (ritirata is the return of soldiers to their barrack, or sailors to their ship after a leave) by Tommaso Mario
- Anniversaries: 10 June – Sinking of the Austro-Hungarian battleship SMS Szent István by Luigi Rizzo
- Decorations: 1 Cavalier Cross of the Military Order of Savoy; 3 Cavalier's Crosses of the Military Order of Italy; 2 Gold Medals of Military Valor; 1 Silver Medal of Military Valor; 1 Gold Medal for Merited Public Honor

Commanders
- Chief of Staff of the Italian Navy: Ammiraglio di squadra Giuseppe Berutti Bergotto
- Deputy Chief of Naval Staff: Ammiraglio di squadra Claudio Gaudiosi

Insignia
- Roundels

- Ensign

- Jack

The Italian Navy (Italian: Marina Militare, lit. 'Military Navy'; abbreviated as MM) is one of the four branches of Italian Armed Forces and was formed in 1946 from what remained of the Regia Marina (Royal Navy) after World War II. The Italian Navy has a strength of approximately 29,300 active personnel, with 184 vessels and 70 aircraft in service. It is considered a multiregional and a blue-water navy.

== History ==
=== Before and during World War II ===
The Regia Marina was formed on 17 March 1861, after the proclamation of the Kingdom of Italy. The Italian Navy assumed its present name after the Italian monarchy was abolished following a popular referendum held on 2 June 1946.

=== After World War II ===
At the end of its five-year involvement in World War II, Italy was a devastated nation. After the end of hostilities, the Regia Marina – which at the beginning of the war was the fourth largest navy in the world, with a mix of modernised and new battleships – started a long and complex rebuilding process. The combat contributions of the Italian naval forces after the signing of the armistice with the Allies on 8 September 1943, and the subsequent cooperation agreement on 23 September 1943, left the Regia Marina in a poor condition, with much of its infrastructure and bases unusable and its ports mined and blocked by sunken ships. However, a large number of its naval units had survived the war, albeit in a low efficiency state, which was due to the conflict and the age of many vessels. The vessels that remained were:

- 5 battleships
- 10 cruisers
- 10 destroyers
- 20 frigates
- 20 corvettes
- 50 fast coastal patrol units
- 50 minesweepers
- 19 amphibious operations vessels
- 5 school ships
- 1 support ship and plane transport

=== The peace treaty ===
The peace treaty signed on 10 February 1947 in Paris was onerous for Regia Marina. Apart from territorial and material losses, also the following restrictions were imposed:

- A ban on owning, building or experimenting with atomic weapons, self-propulsion projectiles or relative launchers, etc.
- A ban on owning battleships, aircraft carriers, submarines and amphibious assault units.
- A ban on operating military installations on the islands of Pantelleria, Pianosa and on the archipelago of the Pelagian Islands.

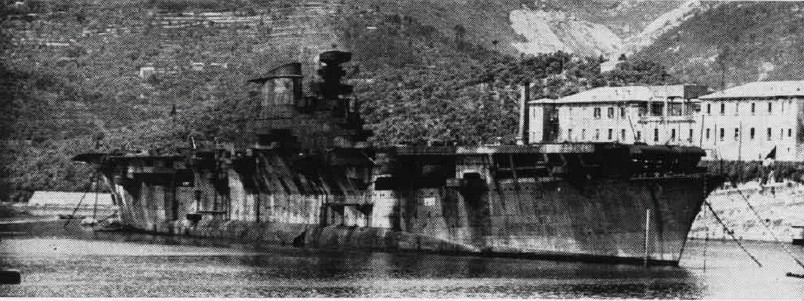
Aircraft carrier Aquila just before being scrapped in La Spezia, 1951

The treaty also ordered Italy to put the following ships at the disposals of the victorious nations United States, Soviet Union, the United Kingdom, France, Greece, Yugoslavia and Albania as war compensation:

- 3 battleships: Giulio Cesare, Italia, Vittorio Veneto;
- 5 cruisers: Emanuele Filiberto Duca d'Aosta, Attilio Regolo, Scipione Africano, Eugenio di Savoia and Eritrea;
- 7 destroyers, 5 of the Soldati class and Augusto Riboty and Alfredo Oriani;
- 6 minesweepers: like Aliseo and Fortunale;
- 8 submarines: 3 of the Acciaio class;
- 1 sailing school ship: Cristoforo Colombo.

=== The entry into NATO ===
Great changes in the international political situation, which were developing into the Cold War, convinced the United Kingdom and United States to discontinue the transfer of Italy's capital ships as war reparations. Some had already been dismantled in La Spezia between 1948 and 1955, including the aircraft carrier Aquila. However, the Soviet Union demanded the surrender of the battleship Giulio Cesare and other naval units designated for transfer. The cruisers Attilio Regolo and Scipione Africano became the French Chateaurenault and Guichen, while Eugenio di Savoia became the Greek Elli. After break up and transfers, only a small part of the fleet remained to be recommissioned into the Marina. As Western attention turned to the Soviets and the Mediterranean Sea, Italian seas became one of the main sites of confrontation between the two superpowers, and Italy's geographical position gave it renewed naval importance within NATO.

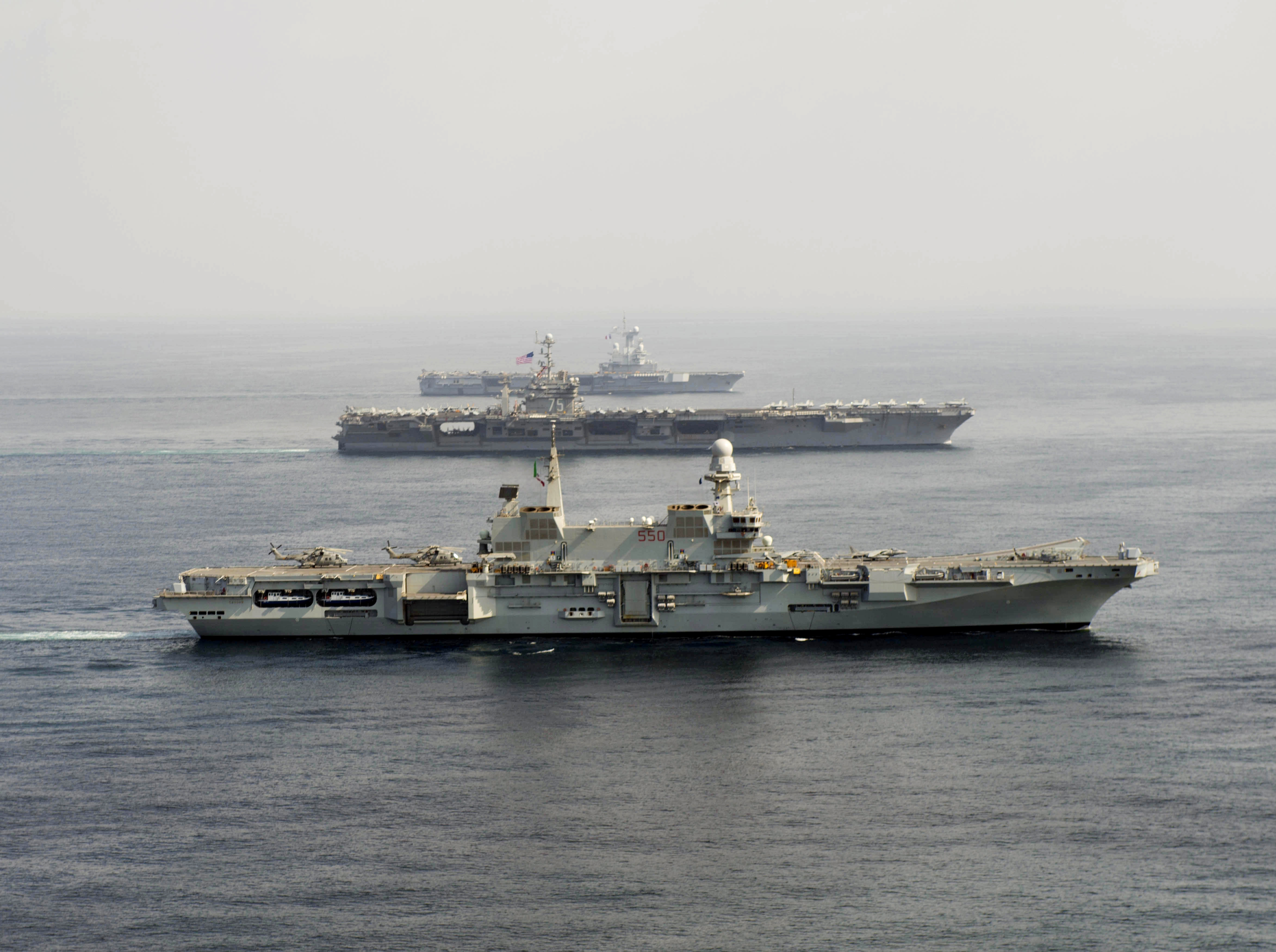
The carrier Cavour in the Gulf of Oman, 2013

With the new elections in 1946, the Kingdom of Italy became a republic, and the Regia Marina took the name of Marina Militare (lit. 'Military Navy'). As the Marshall Plan began to rebuild Italy and Europe was rapidly being divided into two geopolitically antagonistic blocs, Italy began talks with the United States to guarantee adequate security considerations. The US government in Washington wished to keep its own installations on the Italian Peninsula and relaxed the Treaty restrictions by including Italy in the Mutual Defense Assistance Programme (MDAP). On 4 April 1949, Italy joined the North Atlantic Treaty Organization (NATO) and, in order for the navy to contribute actively in the organization, the Treaty restrictions were definitively repealed by the end of 1951, with the consent of all of Western nations.

Within NATO, the Italian Navy was assigned combat control of the Adriatic Sea and Strait of Otranto, as well as the defence of the naval routes through the Tyrrhenian Sea. To ensure these tasks a Studio sul potenziamento della Marina italiana in relazione al Patto Atlantico (Study on the development of the Italian Navy with reference to the Atlantic Pact) was undertaken, which researched the structures and the methods for the development of the navy.

== Naval ensign ==
Naval ensign of Italy

The ensign of the Italian Navy is the flag of Italy bearing the coat of arms of the Italian Navy. The shield's quarters refer to the four Medieval Italian Maritime Republics:

- 1st quarter: on red, a golden winged lion (the lion of St. Mark) wielding a sword (Republic of Venice)
- 2nd quarter: on white field, red cross, the Saint George's Cross (Republic of Genoa)
- 3rd quarter: on blue field, white Maltese cross (Republic of Amalfi)
- 4th quarter: on red field, white Pisan cross (Republic of Pisa)

The coat of arms is surmounted by a golden crown, which distinguishes military vessels from those of the merchant navy.

The crown, corona rostrata, was proposed in 1939 as a conjectural link to the Roman navy by Admiral Domenico Cavagnari, then a member of the Chamber of Fasces and Corporations in the Fascist government. In the proposal, Admiral Cavagnari wrote that "in order to recall the common origin [of the Navy] from the Roman mariners, the Insignia will be surmounted by the towered Crown with rostra, the emblem of honour and valour the Roman Senate awarded to the leaders of naval victories, conquerors of lands and cities across the seas".

A further difference is that St. Mark's lion, symbolising the Republic of Venice, does not hold the gospel in its paw (as it does on the civil ensign, where the book is open at the words "Pax tibi Marce, evangelista meus", meaning "peace to you, Mark, my evangelist") and is wielding a sword instead: such an image is consistent with the pictorial tradition from Venetian history, in which the book is shown open during peacetime and closed during wartime.

== Structure and organisation ==
=== Organization ===
In 2012 the Navy began a restructuring process that will see a 21% decrease in personnel by 2025. A new structure was implemented in January 2014.

| Position | Italian title | Rank | Incumbent |
|---|---|---|---|
| Chief of Staff of the Navy | Capo di Stato Maggiore della Marina | Squadron admiral | Giuseppe Berutti Bergotto |
| Deputy Chief of Staff of the Navy | Sottocapo di Stato Maggiore della Marina | Divisional admiral | Fabio Gregori |
| Commander in Chief Naval Fleet | Comandante in Capo della Squadra Navale (CINCNAV) | Squadron admiral | Aurelio De Carolis |
| Commander Schools Command | Comandante Scuole (MARICOMSCUOLE) | Squadron admiral | Stefano Barbieri |
| Commander Logistics Command | Comandante Logistico (MARICOMLOG) | Squadron admiral | Vincenzo Montanaro |
| Commander Maritime Command North | Comandante del Comando Marittimo Nord (MARINANORD) | Divisional admiral | Flavio Biaggi |
| Commander Maritime Command South | Comandante del Comando Marittimo Sud (MARINASUD) | Divisional admiral | Andrea Petroni |
| Commander Maritime Command Sicily | Comandante del Comando Marittimo Sicilia (MARISICILIA) | Divisional admiral | Andrea Cottini |
| Commander Maritime Command Rome | Comandante del Comando Marittimo Capitale (MARICAPITALE) | Divisional admiral | Fabio Agostini |
| Raiders and Divers Grouping | Comandante Raggruppamento Subacquei ed Incursori (COMSUBIN) | Rear Admiral | Paolo Pezzuti |

=== Coast Guard ===
The Corps of the Port Captaincies – Coast Guard (Corpo delle Capitanerie di porto – Guardia costiera) is part of the coast guard forces of Italy and is part of the Italian Navy under the control of the Ministry of Infrastructures and Transports, the Ministry of the Environment, the Ministry of Agricultural, Food and Forestry Policies, as well as the Ministry of Defence. In Italy, it is commonly known as simply the Guardia costiera or Capitaneria di Porto. The Coast Guard has approximately 11,000 staff.

=== Corps ===
The Italian Navy is divided into six corps (by precedence):

- Corpo di stato maggiore – Staff Officers Corps (SM): line officers
- Corpo del genio della Marina – Naval Engineers Corps (GM)
  - Specialità genio navale – Marine engineering branch (GM/GN): engineer officers
  - Specialità armi navali – Naval ordnance branch (GM/AN): weapon engineer officers
  - Specialità genio infrastrutture – Infrastructure engineering (GM/INFR): civil engineer officers
- Corpo sanitario militare marittimo – Maritime Military Medical Corps: (MD) for medics, (FM) for pharmacists
- Corpo di commissariato militare marittimo – Military Maritime Supply Corps (CM): administration, paymaster, legal executive, supply, logistics officer
- Corpo delle capitanerie di porto – Port Captaincies Corps (CP): the search and rescue corps for Italy
- Corpo degli equipaggi militari marittimi – Military Maritime Crews Corps (CEMM)

=== Fleet ===
Command of the Italian Fleet (ships, submarines and amphibious forces) and Naval aviation falls under the Commander in Chief Naval Fleet.

== Current equipment ==
=== Ships and submarines ===
The fleet includes the following oceangoing units:

- 1 Light STOVL aircraft carrier
- 1 Landing helicopter dock
- 3 amphibious assault ships
- 3 destroyers
- 14 frigates
- 8 attack submarines
- 4 auxiliary ships

Hydrographic Naval Squadron includes:

- 3 hydrographic Ships
- 2 research vessels operated in cooperation with NATO STO CMRE

Patrol and littoral warfare units include:

- 9 offshore patrol vessels
- 10 mine countermeasure vessels
- 6 coastal patrol boats

and a varied fleet of auxiliary ships are also in service.

The flagship of the fleet is the carrier Cavour.

== Future equipment ==
=== Ships and submarines ===
- 1× Bergamini-class GP-enhanced (GP-e, General Purpose with Anti-Submarine Warfare capabilities) frigates, being built to replace two vessels from the Italian FREMM-class build program that were transferred to Egypt in 2020 and 2021; delivery is anticipated in the 2025–26 period.
- 2× Bergamini-class EVO (Anti-Submarine Warfare) frigates; delivery is anticipated in the 2029–30 period.

The 2014 Naval Act allocated €5.4 billion for the following vessels:

- 7× Thaon di Revel-class offshore patrol vessel/frigate— 4× commissioned

The 2017 budget allocated €12.8 billion (2017–2032 years) for the following ships:

- 1× Special & Diving Operations – Submarine Rescue Ship (SOD – SuRS), to replace the submarine rescue ship Anteo
- 1× Major Hydro-oceanographic Ship (NIOM), to replace the hydrographic survey vessel Ammiraglio Magnaghi
- 12× minehunters to replace the Lerici and Gaeta-class minehunters:
  - 8× Cacciamine Nuova Generazione-Costieri (CNG-C, New Generation Minehunter – Coastal) for homeland security roles (about 800 t and 57 m)
  - 4× Cacciamine Nuova Generazione-Altura (CNG-A, New Generation Minehunter – Ocean-going) for expeditionary roles (about 1,300 t and 75–80 m)
- 8× European Patrol Corvettes in a joint program with France (about 3,200 t)

The 2018 budget allocated about €1 billion for:

- 4 x U212NFS attack submarines, for commissioning in 2027–2029–2030–2032. In December 2022, an amended contract was signed for production of a third NFS Submarine based on the design of the previous two submarines. The third Submarine (NFS 3) is planned to be delivered at the end of 2030, while a contract for the fourth boat was signed in 2024.

The "Documento Programmatico Pluriennale 2021–2023" funds the following ships:

- 2× 14,500-ton DDX-class destroyers, a development of the Horizon class to replace the Durand de la Penne-class guided missile destroyers by 2028 to 2030
- 3× Vulcano-class logistic support ships, to replace Vesuvio and Etna (increased to four ships under Defence Planning Document 2023–2025)
- 1× UBOS, diving support vessel
- 10× MTC, coastal transport vessels to replace the Gorgona class and Ponza class
- 4× training vessels
- Mid-Life Update (MLU) of the Horizon-class destroyers
- 3 offshore patrol vessels (OPV) (FCX-20 variant of Fincantieri's FCX; about 2300 tons) ordered August 2023 + 3 ships in option

=== Planned equipment ===
- 2× amphibious transport docks, to replace the San Giorgio-class amphibious transport docks (about 16,500 t) in 2028–2030 period
- 1× electronic surveillance ship to add to the existing Elettra
- 1× submarine and minehunter support ship

For the Naval Aviation the Navy plans to expand or replace the following assets:

- 9× maritime patrol aircraft (currently 4 x ATR 72MP in service)
- 30× heavy helicopters (currently 22 x AW101 in service)
- 12× light utility helicopters, a new acquisition of AW169 helicopters
- 16× tactical unmanned aerial vehicles (currently 10 x ScanEagle in service)

For the San Marco Marine Brigade, the Navy plans to acquire following assets:

- 72× Iveco SuperAV amphibious 8x8 combat vehicles (36 vehicles ordered December 2022)
- 90× VTMM Orso armored 4x4 vehicles

== Rank structure ==
=== Commissioned officer ranks ===
The rank insignia of commissioned officers.

| NATO code | OF-10 | OF-9 | OF-8 | OF-7 | OF-6 | OF-5 | OF-4 | OF-3 | OF-2 | OF-1 |
|---|---|---|---|---|---|---|---|---|---|---|---|
| Italian Navy |
| Italian Navy | | Ammiraglio | Ammiraglio di squadra | Ammiraglio di divisione | Contrammiraglio | Capitano di vascello | Capitano di fregata | Capitano di corvetta | Tenente di vascello | Sottotenente di vascello | Guardiamarina |

=== Other ranks ===
The rank insignia of non-commissioned officers and enlisted personnel.

| NATO code | OR-9 | | | OR-8 | OR-7 | | OR-6 | OR-5 | OR-4 | OR-3 | OR-2 | OR-1 |
|---|---|---|---|---|---|---|---|---|---|---|---|---|
| Italian Navy | | | | Capo di prima classe / Capo di seconda classe / Capo di terza classe | | | | | Sottocapo aiutante / Sottocapo scelto / Sottocapo di prima classe / Sottocapo di seconda classe / Sottocapo di terza classe | | | No insignia |
| Italian Navy | Primo luogotenente | Luogotenente | Primo maresciallo | Capo di prima classe / Capo di seconda classe / Capo di terza classe | Secondo aiutante | Secondo capo scelto | Secondo capo | Sergente | Sottocapo aiutante / Sottocapo scelto / Sottocapo di prima classe / Sottocapo di seconda classe / Sottocapo di terza classe | Comune scelto | Comune di prima classe | Comune di seconda classe |

== See also ==
- Italian Armed Forces
- Uniforms of the Italian Armed Forces
- Gruppo Sportivo della Marina Militare
- List of active Italian Navy ships
- List of decommissioned ships of the Italian Navy
- Regia Marina
