= Italian frigate Alpino (F 594) =

FREMM class multi-purpose frigates in the Italian Navy

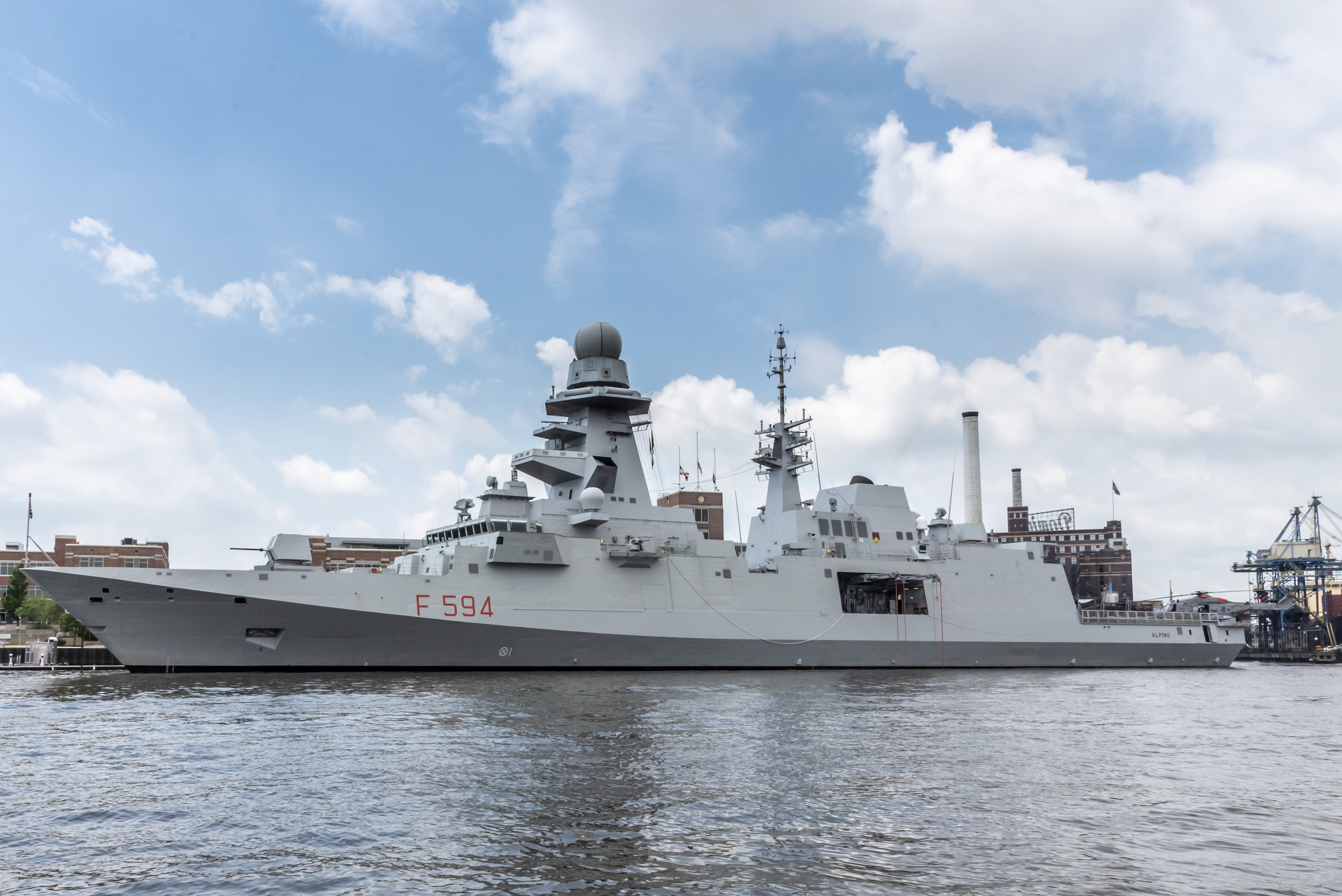
- Alpino at Baltimore on 27 May 2018

History

Italy
- Name: Alpino
- Namesake: Alpino, a mountain infantryman of the Italian Alpini
- Builder: Fincantieri, Riva Trigoso and Muggiano
- Laid down: 23 February 2012
- Launched: 13 December 2014
- Commissioned: 30 September 2016
- Home port: Taranto
- Identification: MMSI number: 247364400; Callsign: IAIL; Pennant number: F 594
- Motto: Di qui non si passa; 'You can't go through here'
- Status: Active

General characteristics
- Class & type: Carlo Bergamini-class frigate
- Displacement: 6,700 tons
- Length: 144.6 m (474.4 ft)
- Beam: 19.7 m (64.6 ft)
- Draught: 8.7 m (28.5 ft)
- Propulsion: CODLAG; 1 × 32 MW gas turbine General Electric/Avio LM2500+G4; 2 × 2.5 MW electric motors Jeumont Electric; 4 × diesel generators; VL 1716 (T2ME series by 2,15 MW everyone, on first two frigate; HPCR series by 2,8 MW everyone, since the third frigate); 2 × shafts, driving controllable pitch propellers; 1 × 1 MW bow thruster
- Speed: 27 knots (50 km/h; 31 mph); max cruise speed 15.6 knots (28.9 km/h; 18.0 mph)
- Range: 6,800 nmi (12,600 km; 7,800 mi) at 15 knots (28 km/h; 17 mph)
- Complement: 201
- Sensors & processing systems: Leonardo Kronos Grand Naval (MFRA) Active electronically scanned array radar; CAPTAS-4 towed-array sonar; UMS 4110 CL hull-mounted sonar
- Armament: 16-cell MBDA SYLVER A50 VLS for 16 MBDA Aster 15 and 30 missiles; 2 × Leonardo OTO Melara 76/62 mm Davide/Strales CIWS guns; 2 × Leonardo Oto Melara/Oerlikon KBA 25/80 mm remote weapon systems; 4 × MBDA Teseo Mk-2/A anti-ship and land attack missiles; 4 × MBDA MILAS anti-submarine missiles; 2 x triple Leonardo (WASS) B-515/3 launcher for MU 90 torpedoes; 2 x SITEP MASS CS-424 acoustic guns
- Aircraft carried: 2 × SH90; 1 × SH90; 1 × AW101 (armed with MU 90 torpedoes or MBDA Marte Mk2/S missiles)
- Aviation facilities: Double hangar

Alpino (F 594) is a Carlo Bergamini-class frigate of the Italian Navy. Which in turn were developed by the FREMM multipurpose frigate program.

== Development and design ==
Planning assumptions for the Italian Navy are 10 FREMM-IT (4 ASW variants and 6 GP variants) at a cost of €5.9 billion. FREMM-IT will replace the Maestrale and Lupo-class frigates in service with the Italian Navy. In the 2013 Italian budget, the Italian government laid out the necessary financing for two more GP variants (FREMM-IT 7 & 8) and the contract was awarded in September 2013. On 15 April 2015, the Italian Parliament confirmed the deal between OCCAR and Orizzonte Sistemi Navali Spa (Fincantieri and Finmeccanica, since 2017 Leonardo) to begin building units 9 and 10, for 764 million Euros.

As of 16 April 2015, the Italian government has approved funding for all ten FREMM-IT to be delivered to the Italian Navy (4 ASW variants and 6 GP variants).

FREMM-IT 9 & 10 will have undisclosed enhanced capabilities. All 10 Italian FREMM-ITs have extended AAW capabilities, with SAAM-ESD CMS, Aster 30 and Aster 15 missiles for extended area defence. SAAM-ESD CMS use Leonardo MFRA, a 3D active radar (AESA), an evolved version of the Leonardo EMPAR PESA radar (previously embarked on Horizon-class destroyers and the aircraft carrier Cavour). Since the 7th FREMM-IT, there will be updates, such as new conformal IFF antenna and much more stealth response. Since the 9th FREMM-IT, SCLAR-H replaced with Leonardo ODLS-20. In 2017 the Italian FREMM refit started with the installation on each of 2 SITEP MS-424 acoustic guns.

In 2020 it was reported that Italy would sell its last two FREMM-class frigates in the current production line (Spartaco Schergat and Emilio Bianchi) to Egypt. Spartaco Schergat was in the final stage of her sea trials while Emilio Bianchi would follow within one year. The deal reportedly also involved other military equipment and was worth 1.2 billion Euros. It was reported that Italy would then order two additional FREMM frigates to replace those transferred to Egypt with the anticipated delivery of the replacements by 2024.

== Construction and career ==
On 13 December 2014, the launching ceremony of the ship took place at the Fincantieri plants in La Spezia, in the presence of the Nicola Latorre, president of the Senate Defense Commission, of the Chief of Defense, Admiral Luigi Binelli Mantelli, of the Chief of Staff of the Navy Military, Squad Admiral Giuseppe De Giorgi, the Chief of Staff of the Army, Corps General Claudio Graziano, and various representatives of the ANMI.

On 5 and 6 October, Carrier Strike Groups of the Indian Navy and the Italian Navy led by INS Vikramaditya and ITS Cavour and accompanied by INS Visakhapatnam and ITS Alpino participated in a maritime bilateral exercise in the Arabian Sea. The exercise included aircraft like MiG-29K, F-35B and AV-8B Harrier II and integral helicopters. Operations in the sea phase included intense flight operations with fighter jets and helicopters for combined Large Force Engagements, Air Combat Missions, Helicopter Operations and Search & Rescue missions as well as co-ordinated weapon firings & joint manoeuvres to enhance joint operations, Command & Control capabilities and interoperability. The exercise also saw the participation of the Indian Air Force. During the Harbour Phase from 1 to 4 October, the exercise saw Subject Matter Expert exchanges and other key interactions as well as a Pre-Sail Planning Conference.

On September 24, 2025, the Alpino was authorized to intervene immediately by the Minister of Defense Guido Crosetto to provide assistance to the Italian citizens on the Global Sumud Flotilla after the convoy reported attacks by drones piloted by currently unidentified perpetrators. The Italian frigate will be joined by the Spanish vessel Furor (P-46).

== Gallery ==
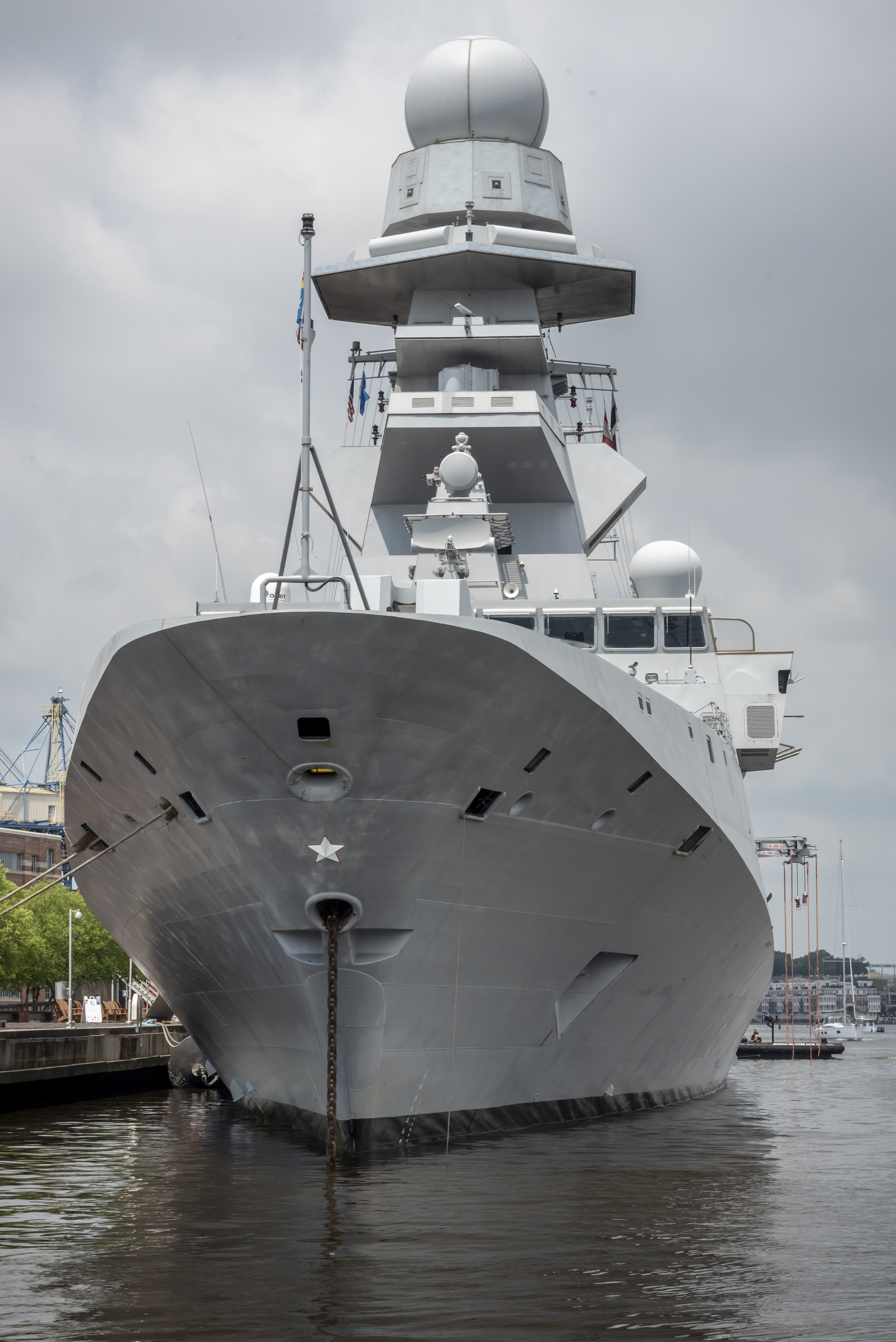
Alpino at Baltimore on 27 May 2018.

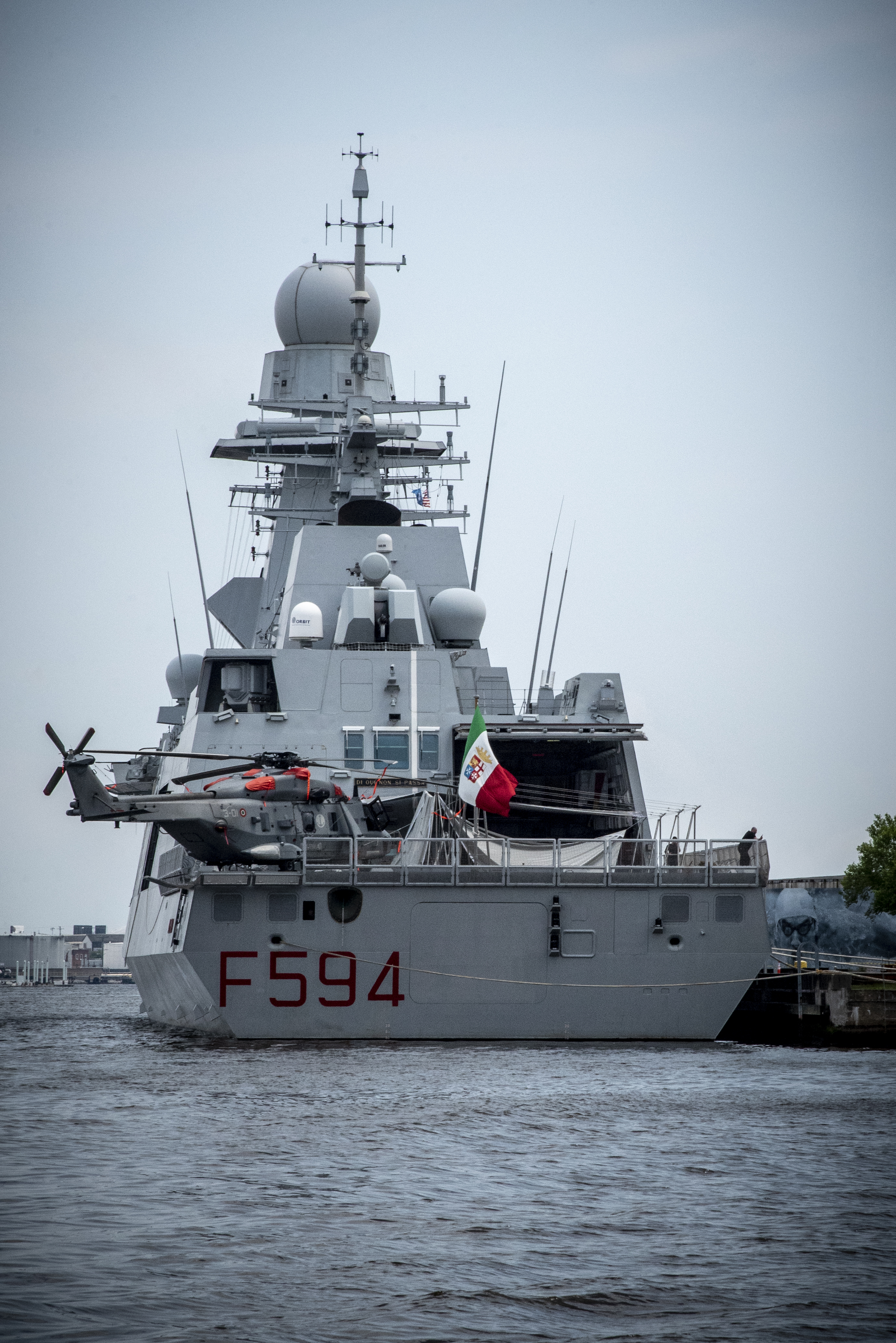
Alpino at Baltimore on 27 May 2018.
