= Emilio Brenta =

Italian admiral (1889–1978)

- Born: 24 April 1889; Turin, Kingdom of Italy
- Died: 22 October 1978 (aged 89); Rocca Priora, Italy
- Military career
- Allegiance: Kingdom of Italy; Italy
- Branch: Regia Marina; Italian Navy
- Rank: Admiral
- Commands: Airone (torpedo boat); Astore (torpedo boat); Calipso (torpedo boat); 13 OS (torpedo boat); Eridano (torpedo boat); Giuseppe Dezza (destroyer); Carlo Mirabello (destroyer leader); Naval Command School; Giulio Cesare (battleship); 5th Naval Division; Naval Department of the Northern Adriatic
- Conflicts: Italo-Turkish War; World War I; World War II
- Awards: Bronze Medal of Military Valor; War Merit Cross; Order of the Crown of Italy; Colonial Order of the Star of Italy; Order of Saints Maurice and Lazarus; Order of Merit of the Italian Republic

Emilio Brenta (Turin, 24 April 1889 – Rocca Priora, 22 October 1978) was an Italian admiral during World War II.

== Biography ==
Born in Turin in 1889, he entered the Livorno Naval Academy in 1906, and graduated in 1910 with the rank of ensign. In 1911-1912 he participated in the Italo-Turkish War serving aboard the armoured cruiser Pisa, and after promotion to lieutenant in 1915 he participated in the early stages of World War I serving on the gunboat Giuliana, the protected cruiser Giovanni Bausan and the armoured cruiser Varese, after which he was stationed at the Italian naval base in Vlore for ten months in 1916. He then returned on Pisa, as adjutant to the divisional commander, and then served in the same capacity on battleships Vittorio Emanuele and Sardegna, being awarded a Bronze Medal of Military Valor for an action in the northern Adriatic in September 1917.

From 1919 to 1923 Brenta commanded the torpedo boats Airone, Astore, Calipso, 13 OS and Eridano, after which he was attached to the staff of the Command of the Naval Forces of the Mediterranean onboard Conte di Cavour. After being promoted to lieutenant commander he was assigned to the operations office of the Naval Command of Pola, and later to the Ministry of the Navy in Rome. He was then promoted to commander and given command of the destroyer Giuseppe Dezza, after which he became executive officer of the battleship Duilio, commanding officer of the destroyer leader Carlo Mirabello and then commander of the Naval Command School, with the destroyer Giuseppe Cesare Abba as flagship, between 1930 and 1933.

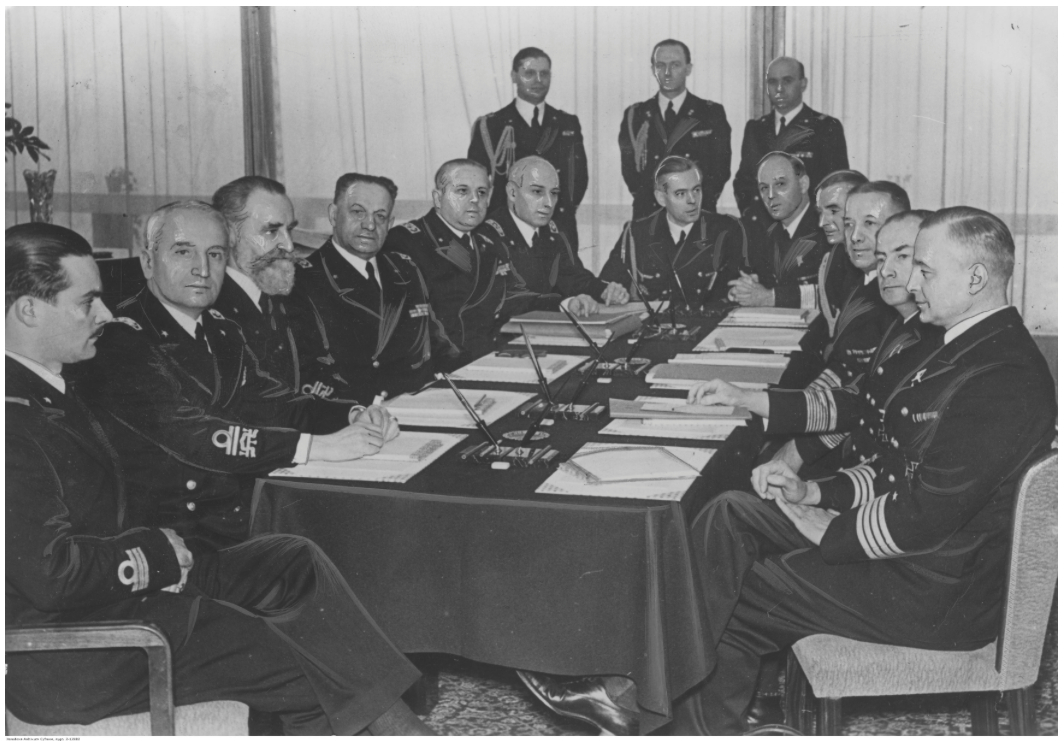
Brenta with admirals Arturo Riccardi, Raffaele de Courten, Carlo Giartosio, Erich Raeder and Kurt Fricke and Captain Kurt Aschmann during the Meran naval conference in March 1941

After being promoted to captain he served for a period at the Ministry of the Navy before being given command of the battleship Giulio Cesare from 1936 to 1938. He was then promoted to rear admiral and held a series of assignments in Rome until 1942: member of the High Council of the Navy, member of the High Committee for the Coordination of Technical Projects, member of the Committee for Warship Projects and of the Committee for Naval Weapons Projects, and head of the Operations Office of Supermarina in 1940-1941. Having been promoted to vice admiral, he was briefly appointed adjunct Deputy Chief of Staff at Supermarina and then commander of the 5th Naval Division in 1943. In early September 1943, a few days before the proclamation of the Armistice of Cassibile, he was given command of the Naval Department of the Northern Adriatic, with headquarters in Venice, replacing Admiral Ferdinando of Savoy-Genova.

The proclamation of the Armistice on 8 September found him in Venice, where his forces were quickly surrounded by German troops, whose commanders threatened to bomb the ancient city and carry out reprisals on captured Italian personnel if he did not surrender. After lengthy talks, Brenta surrendered Venice and its garrison of 16,000 men on 11 September, and was then taken as a prisoner of war to Oflag 64/Z in Schokken, Poland, where he remained until late January 1945 (except for a period of imprisonment in Stalag XX-A in Toruń, as punishment for being one of the most vocal anti-Germans among the Schokken prisoners), when he was freed by the advancing Red Army.

He was able to return to Italy in late 1945, after which he became a member of the Special Enquiry Commission, then its president from 1947 to 1949, and then member of the Commission tasked with investigating personnel accused of war crimes until 1952. For this activity he was awarded the Order of Merit of the Italian Republic. He was then appointed president of the interministerial commission tasked with studying the problem of wartime supplies by the Minister of Defense, until 1956. In 1959 he was transferred to the naval reserve, and he died in Rocca Priora, near Rome, in 1978.
