= Corso Pecori Giraldi =

Italian admiral

- Born: 9 July 1899; Pozzuoli, Kingdom of Italy
- Died: 17 May 1964 (aged 64); Freiburg im Breisgau, Federal Republic of Germany
- Military career
- Allegiance: Kingdom of Italy; Italy
- Branch: Regia Marina; Italian Navy
- Service years: 1913–1962
- Rank: Admiral
- Commands: Andrea Bafile (gunboat); 53 AS (torpedo boat); Ostro (destroyer); Dardo (destroyer); Vincenzo Gioberti (destroyer); Italian Naval Group Northern Aegean; Vittorio Veneto (battleship); 3rd Naval Division; 1st Naval Division; Venice Naval Command; Naval Department of the Adriatic; Chief of Staff of the Italian Navy
- Conflicts: World War I; Spanish Civil War; World War II; Operation Vigorous
- Awards: Silver Medal of Military Valor; Bronze Medal of Military Valor; War Merit Cross; Military Order of Italy; Order of the Crown of Italy; Colonial Order of the Star of Italy; Order of Saints Maurice and Lazarus; Order of Merit of the Italian Republic; Iron Cross First Class; Iron Cross Second Class

Corso Pecori Giraldi (Pozzuoli, 9 July 1899 – Freiburg im Breisgau, 17 May 1964) was an Italian admiral. He commanded Italian naval forces in Greece and later the battleship Vittorio Veneto during World War II, and after the war he became Chief of Staff of the Italian Navy from 1955 to 1962.

== Biography ==
He was born in Pozzuoli on 9 July 1899 into a family of the Florentine aristocracy, the third son of Count Alessandro Pecori Giraldi, Army officer and brother of Guglielmo Pecori Giraldi, and of Baroness Eleonora von Tautphoeus, daughter of a German diplomat. On 30 September 1913 he entered the Naval Academy of Livorno, graduating in 1917 with the rank of ensign; during the First World War he served as gunnery officer on the battleship Duilio. On 1 October 1918 he was promoted to Sub-Lieutenant and subsequently assigned on the battleship Conte di Cavour and then on the scout cruiser Sparviero before returning on 1 July 1921 to the Naval Academy of Livorno to follow the higher course, being promoted to lieutenant on the following 8 December, then serving as fire control officer on the flotilla leader Premuda from late 1921 to 1923.

Between 1924 and 1925 he was a aide to the commander of the Naval Academy and from 1925 to 1928 to Lieutenant Commander Aimone of Savoy-Aosta, following him on the destroyer Quintino Sella. On January 16, 1928, he obtained his first naval command, the escort gunboat Andrea Bafile; he later became commander of the coastal torpedo boat 53 AS. On 11 April 1929 he was promoted to Lieutenant Commander, and three days later he became head of the coordination office at the Naval General Staff; from 19 January to 17 April 1930 he took part, as secretary of the Italian delegation, in the London Naval Conference. On 14 July 1930 he married Maria Francesca Frascara, with whom he had three children, Maria José (born in 1931), Alvise (born in 1932, who also became a naval officer) and Piero (born in 1935).

Between 1931 and 1932 he was in command of the destroyers Ostro and Dardo. On April 2, 1934, after a period as executive officer on the royal yacht Savoia and of the heavy cruiser Zara, he was promoted to commander and appointed deputy chief of staff at the Naval Department of Naples before being posted in Rome at the Ministry of the Navy as liaison officer with the Ministry of Foreign Affairs. On 19 September 1937 he was given command of the destroyer Vincenzo Gioberti, then under construction, of which he was the first commander; after supervising the fitting-out and sea trials, he participated in naval operations supporting the Francoists during the Spanish Civil War.

On 7 June 1938, thanks to his perfect knowledge of the German language, he was appointed naval attaché at the Italian embassy in Berlin, where he was at the time of Italy's entry into the Second World War, holding this position until the end of March 1941 (he had meanwhile been promoted, on January 1, 1940, to the rank of captain). On April 2, 1941, he was appointed commander of the Italian Naval Group of the Northern Aegean (Marisudest) with headquarters in Athens, as well as Italian chief of staff of the Kriegsmarine in the Aegean. For his activity in this role he was awarded the Iron Cross first and second class from the German authorities.

In February 1942 he became commanding officer of the battleship Vittorio Veneto, participating in war operations in the Mediterranean, most importantly Operation Vigorous in June 1942. After the Armistice of Cassibile in September 1943, Vittorio Veneto sailed to Malta with the rest of the Italian battlefleet, and was then interned in the Great Bitter Lake in Egypt. Pecori Giraldi was repatriated in late 1943 and appointed head of the operations department of the Naval staff from 12 November 1943 until after the end of the war. Altogether, for his wartime service he was awarded a Silver and a Bronze Medal of Military Valor and was made a Knight of the Military Order of Savoy.

On 16 January 1947 he was promoted to rear admiral and appointed deputy chief of staff of the Navy as well as member of the High Council of the Navy. On 1 March 1948 he was promoted to the rank of vice admiral, assuming command of the 3rd Naval Division on 15 May 1950 and of the 1st Naval Division from the following 10 December. On 1 October 1951 he became a naval commander of Venice during a period of deteriorating relations with Yugoslavia, and on 8 November 1952 he was promoted to the rank of admiral. On 25 February 1953 he was appointed commander-in-chief of the Naval Department of the Adriatic, with headquarters in Venice, until 10 August 1955, when he assumed the position of Chief of Staff of the Navy, which he held for almost seven years, until 30 April 1962.

In this capacity, he continued Admiral Emilio Ferreri's work of reconstruction and strengthening of the fleet, with the commissioning of the new fleet destroyers San Marco and San Giorgio, of the Indomito-class destroyers, of the Centauro-class frigates, and the planning of two shipbuilding programs, the first in 1957-58 and the second in 1960-61, which involved the construction of large missile cruisers, helicopter frigates, antisubmarine corvettes and missile destroyers, as well as the reorganization of commands and ground services, the improvement of armaments and the intensification of personnel training. These programs led to the realization of the Doria-class missile cruisers, the Bergamini-class frigates, the transformation of light cruiser Giuseppe Garibaldi into a missile cruiser and the construction of the Impavido-class missile destroyers.

On July 14, 1961, together with President of the Republic Giovanni Gronchi, Pecori Giraldi attended the great naval review held in the Gulf of Gaeta as part of the celebrations of the first centenary of the Unification of Italy. On 31 October 1962 he retired from active service due to reaching age limits and was appointed Knight of the Grand Cross of the Order of Merit of the Italian Republic.

He died suddenly on 17 May 1964 in Freiburg im Breisgau, in the Federal Republic of Germany.
