= Domenico Cavagnari =

Italian admiral (1876–1966)

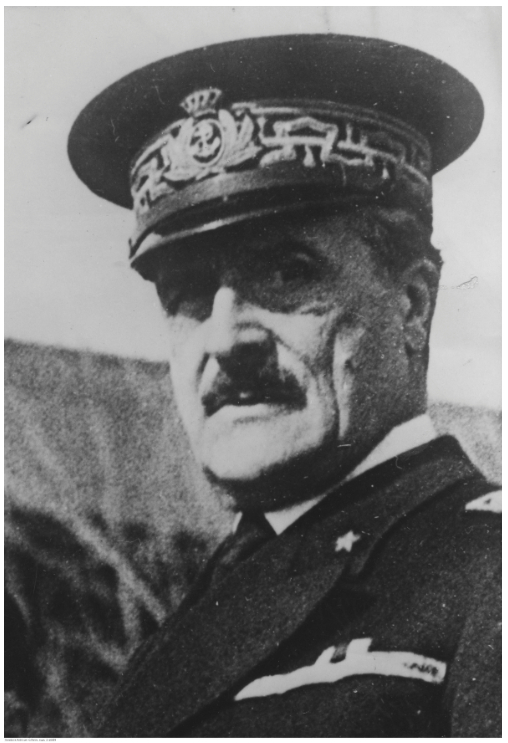

Chief of Staff of the Regia Marina
- In office 6 November 1933 – 8 December 1940
- Preceded by: Gino Ducci
- Succeeded by: Arturo Riccardi

Personal details
- Born: 20 July 1876 Genoa, Italy
- Died: 2 November 1966 (aged 90) Rome, Italy
- Nickname: Mingo

Military service
- Allegiance: Kingdom of Italy
- Branch/service: Regia Marina
- Years of service: 1895–1941
- Rank: Ammiraglio d'Armata
- Commands: Chief of Staff of the Regia Marina
- Battles/wars: World War I World War II

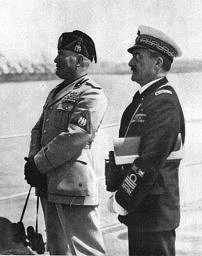
Cavagnari with Benito Mussolini

Domenico Cavagnari (20 July 1876, Genoa – 2 November 1966, Rome) was an Italian admiral and the Chief of Staff of the Regia Marina from 1933 until 1940.

== Early life and career ==
Born to a pharmacist, he enrolled in the Accademia Navale di Livorno in 1889, at an unusually young age of 13; he graduated from it in 1895. He participated in a Far East cruise on the armored cruiser Vettor Pisani from April to December 1903, after which he was named adjutant to the Minister of the Navy Carlo Mirabello. In 1914 he was promoted Capitano di Corvetta. During World War I, he commanded the coastal torpedo-boat 9 PN, and then the 6th Torpedo-Boat Flotilla; in 1917 he was under the command of Admiral Paolo Thaon di Revel, then commanding the naval station of Venice, until April 1918, when he was given command of the destroyer Felice Orsini. During the war he was promoted Capitano di Fregata and gained three Silver Medals of Military Valor.

After the war, Cavagnari was promoted Capitano di Vascello in 1922 and given command of the "esploratore" Pantera and its flotilla, which he led in a goodwill cruise to the North Sea and the Baltic Sea in 1925. Promoted Contrammiraglio in 1927, he was named commander of the Accademia Navale in 1929, and remained as such till 1932; afterwards, he commanded the 2a Divisione (with the heavy cruiser Trento as his flagship.

== Chief of Staff ==
On 7 November 1933 Benito Mussolini fired the Minister of the Navy, Admiral Giuseppe Sirianni, took up the role of Minister himself and named Cavagnari Chief of Staff of the Regia Marina.

As Chief of Staff, he was largely responsible for the expansion and preparation of the Italian Navy in the years before World War II. Cavagnari was a proponent of a large fleet based on battleships (in his tenure, four new Littorio-class battleships were laid down and four older battleships were modernized) and submarines (by 1940, Italy possessed one of the largest submarine fleets of the world); he instead showed little interest in aircraft carriers and new technologies such as radar.

After Italy joined the war on 10 June 1940, the Italian Navy's unpreparedness (highlighted in the indecisive engagement of Punta Stilo and on the Battle of Taranto, in which three battleships were heavily damaged by British torpedo-bombers) led to his dismissal. He was succeeded by Admiral Arturo Riccardi.

== Honours and awards ==
- Grand Officer of the Order of the Crown of Italy (25 October 1931)
- Officer of the Order of Saints Maurice and Lazarus (19 June 1924)
- Commander of the Order of Saints Maurice and Lazarus (20 July 1925)
- Grand Officer of the Order of Saints Maurice and Lazarus (31 December 1934)
- Knight of the Military Order of Savoy (24 July 1919)
- Grand Officer of the Military Order of Savoy (31 July 1939)
- Silver Medal of Military Valor (three awards)
- Allied Victory Medal
- Commemorative Medal of the Unity of Italy
- Commemorative Medal for the Italo-Austrian War 1915-1918
- Commemorative Medal of the Libyan Campaigns

== Bibliography ==
- Cernuschi, Enrico (2001). Domenico Cavagnari - Storia di un'ammiraglio. Rivista Marittima.
