= Chief of Staff of the Italian Navy =

Naval commander

- Capo di Stato Maggiore della Marina Militare
- Flag of the Chief of Staff of the Italian Navy

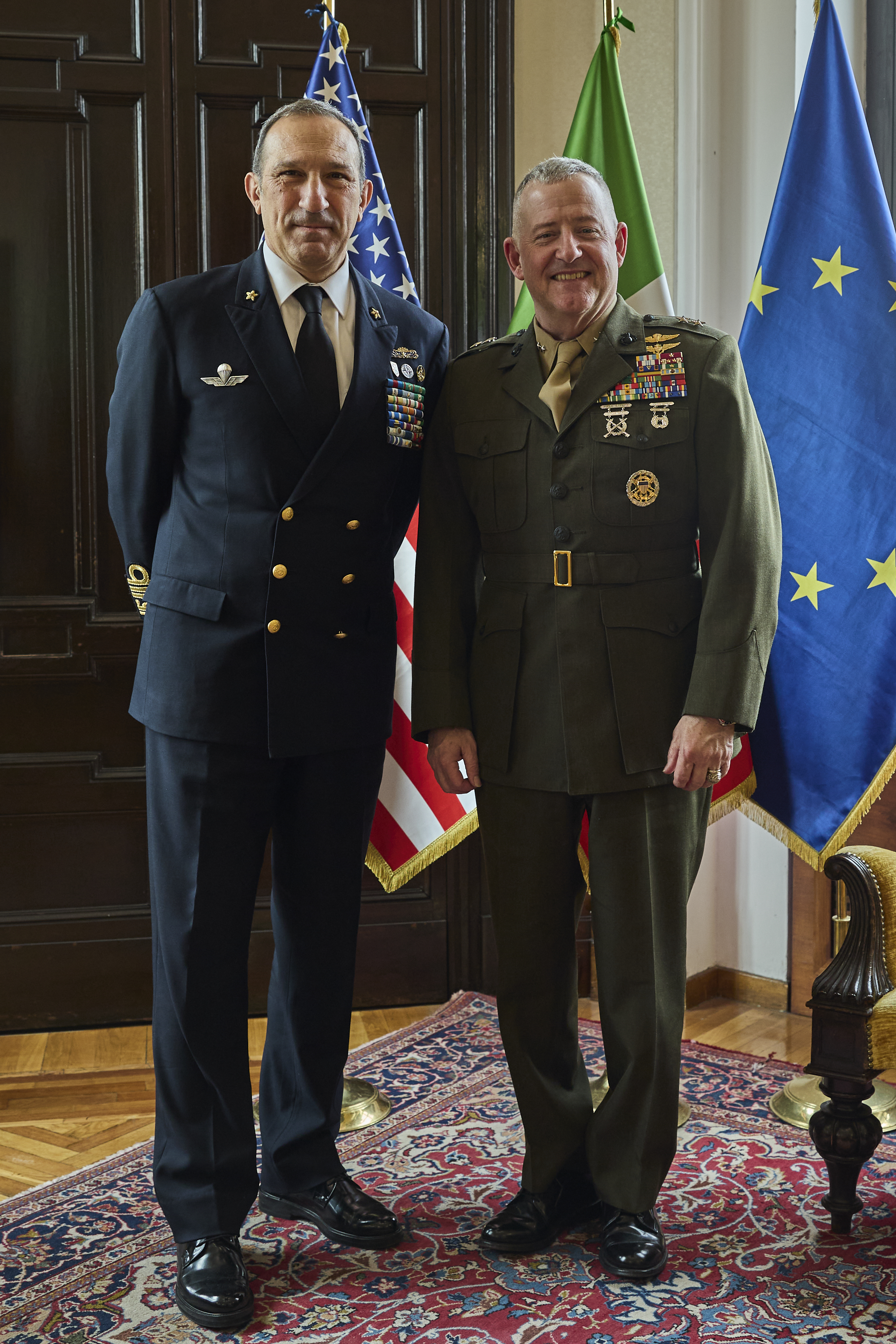
- Incumbent; Admiral Giuseppe Berutti Bergotto since 6 November 2025
- Ministry of Defence
- Member of: Italian Navy
- Reports to: Chief of the Defence Staff
- Formation: 1927
- First holder: Ernesto Burzagli

The Chief of Staff of the Italian Navy (Italian: Capo di Stato Maggiore della Marina Militare) is the commander of the Italian Navy

== List of chiefs of staff ==
=== Kingdom of Italy ===
No.	Portrait	Chief of the Navy	Took office	Left office	Time in office
1	Ernesto Burzagli	Ammiraglio d'armata Ernesto Burzagli (1873–1944)	1927	1931	3–4 years
2	Gino Ducci [it]	Ammiraglio d'armata Gino Ducci (1872–1962)	1931	1934	2–3 years
3	Domenico Cavagnari	Ammiraglio d'armata Domenico Cavagnari (1876–1966)	1934	1940	5–6 years
4	Arturo Riccardi	Ammiraglio d'armata Arturo Riccardi (1878–1966)	1940	1943	2–3 years
5	Raffaele de Courten	Ammiraglio di squadra Raffaele de Courten (1888–1978)	1943	1946	2–3 years

=== Italian Republic ===
No.	Portrait	Chief of the Navy	Took office	Left office	Time in office
5	Raffaele de Courten	Ammiraglio di squadra Raffaele de Courten (1888–1978)	1946	1947	0–1 years
6	Francesco Maugeri	Ammiraglio di squadra Francesco Maugeri (1898–1978)	1947	1948	0–1 years
7	Emilio Ferreri	Ammiraglio di squadra Emilio Ferreri (1894–1981)	1948	1955	6–7 years
8	Corso Pecori Giraldi	Ammiraglio di squadra Corso Pecori Giraldi (1899–1964)	1955	1962	6–7 years
9	Ernesto Giuriati	Ammiraglio di squadra Ernesto Giuriati (1902–1998)	1962	1965	2–3 years
10	Alessandro Michelagnoli [it]	Ammiraglio di squadra Alessandro Michelagnoli (1905–1969)	9 October 1965	9 September 1968	2 years
11	Virgilio Spigai [it]	Ammiraglio di squadra Virgilio Spigai (1907–1976)	10 September 1968	21 October 1970	2 years
12	Giuseppe Roselli Lorenzini [it]	Ammiraglio di squadra Giuseppe Roselli Lorenzini (1910–1987)	22 October 1970	4 May 1973	2 years
13	Gino De Giorgi	Ammiraglio di squadra Gino De Giorgi (1914–1979)	5 May 1973	1977	3–4 years
14	Giovanni Torrisi [it]	Ammiraglio di squadra Giovanni Torrisi (1917–1992)	1977	1980	2–3 years
15	Mario Bini [it]	Ammiraglio di squadra Mario Bini (1918–2012)	1980	1981	0–1 years
16	Angelo Monassi [it]	Ammiraglio di squadra Angelo Monassi (1920–2000)	1981	1984	2–3 years
17	Vittorio Marulli [it]	Ammiraglio di squadra Vittorio Marulli (1922–2000)	1984	15 November 1985	0–1 years
18	Giasone Piccioni [it]	Ammiraglio di squadra Giasone Piccioni (1923–2002)	16 November 1985	31 March 1988	2 years
19	Sergio Majoli	Ammiraglio di squadra Sergio Majoli (1926–2007)	1 April 1988	1989	0–1 years
20	Filippo Ruggiero	Ammiraglio di squadra Filippo Ruggiero (1929–2014)	1989	21 April 1992	2–3 years
21	Guido Venturoni	Ammiraglio di squadra Guido Venturoni (1934–2025)	22 April 1992	13 May 1993	1 years
22	Angelo Mariani [it]	Ammiraglio di squadra Angelo Mariani (born 1935)	1994	1998	3–4 years
23	Umberto Guarnieri [it]	Ammiraglio di squadra Umberto Guarnieri (born 1937)	1998	2001	2–3 years
24	Marcello De Donno [it]	Ammiraglio di squadra Marcello De Donno (born 1941)	2001	2004	2–3 years
25	Sergio Biraghi [it]	Ammiraglio di squadra Sergio Biraghi (born 1941)	2004	2006	1–2 years
26	Paolo La Rosa	Ammiraglio di squadra Paolo La Rosa (born 1947)	2006	22 February 2010	3–4 years
27	Bruno Branciforte	Ammiraglio di squadra Bruno Branciforte (born 1947)	23 February 2010	1 March 2012	2 years, 7 days years
28	Luigi Binelli Mantelli	Ammiraglio di squadra Luigi Binelli Mantelli (born 1950)	2 March 2012	27 January 2013	335 days years
29	Giuseppe De Giorgi	Ammiraglio di squadra Giuseppe De Giorgi (born 1953)	28 January 2013	21 June 2016	3 years, 145 days years
30	Valter Girardelli	Ammiraglio di squadra Valter Girardelli (born 1955)	22 June 2016	21 June 2019	2 years, 364 days years
31	Giuseppe Cavo Dragone	Ammiraglio di squadra Giuseppe Cavo Dragone (born 1957)	21 June 2019	19 October 2021	2 years, 120 days
32	Enrico Credendino	Ammiraglio di squadra Enrico Credendino (born 1963)	19 October 2021	6 November 2025	4 years, 18 days years
33	Giuseppe Berutti Bergotto	Ammiraglio di squadra Giuseppe Berutti Bergotto (born 1963)	6 November 2025	Incumbent	305 days
