= Girardelli =

Girardelli is an Italian surname. Notable people with the surname include:

- Marc Girardelli (born 1963), Austrian and Luxembourgish alpine skier
- Valter Girardelli (born 1955), Italian admiral

== See also ==
- Ghirardelli Chocolate Company
- Ghirardelli (surname)
