= Gino de Giorgi =

Italian admiral

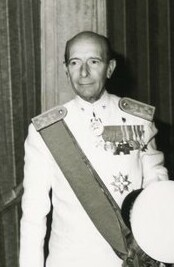
- Gino de Giorgi, 1976
- Born: 17 July 1914; Florence, Italy
- Died: 13 September 1979 (aged 65); Rome, Italy
- Military career
- Allegiance: Italy
- Branch: Italian Navy
- Service years: 1936–1977
- Rank: Admiral
- Commands: Chief of Staff of the Italian Navy (1973–1977)
- Conflicts: World War II
- Awards: Knight Grand Cross of the Order of Merit of the Italian Republic; Silver Medal of Military Valor; War Merit Cross

Gino de Giorgi (17 July 1914 – 13 September 1979) was an Italian admiral and Chief of Staff of the Italian Navy from 5 May 1973 to 31 July 1977. He was the Italian Representative to the Supreme Allied Commander Atlantic (SACLANT) in Norfolk, Virginia, and member of the NATO Standing Group in Washington, D.C., from 1959 to 1960.

De Giorgi attended the Italian Naval Academy in Livorno from 1931 to 1936 when he graduated with the rank of navy guard.

== Career ==
During the last years of the Second World War, he was assigned on board the Destroyer Legionnaire and was promoted secretary of the Destroyers Group. De Giorgi was then given command of the Corvette Dryad. In 1952 he was promoted to frigate captain and was given command of the 1st Flotilla GIS.

From 1957 to 1958 he was commander of the 4th Squadron Corvette and was then assigned to the Department of Telecommunications of the Italian Navy Staff, dealing with the study and research of new technologies in the field of electronic warfare.

== Honours and awards ==
Knight Grand Cross of the Order of Merit of the Italian Republic – awarded on 10 May 1973
Silver Medal of Military Valor – awarded twice
War Merit Cross – awarded twice
