= Emilio Ferreri =

Italian admiral

- Born: 28 December 1894; Rome, Kingdom of Italy
- Died: 27 August 1981 (aged 86); Rome, Italy
- Military career
- Allegiance: Kingdom of Italy; Italy
- Branch: Regia Marina; Italian Navy
- Rank: Admiral
- Commands: F 6 (submarine); Ostro (destroyer); Fiume (heavy cruiser); Zara (heavy cruiser); Chief of Staff of the Navy
- Conflicts: Italo-Turkish War; World War I; World War II
- Awards: Silver Medal of Military Valor (twice); War Cross for Military Valor (twice); War Merit Cross; Military Order of Italy; Order of the Crown of Italy; Order of Merit of the Italian Republic; Order of Saints Maurice and Lazarus

Emilio Ferreri (28 December 1894 in Rome – 27 August 1981) was an Italian admiral during World War II. After the war, he was Chief of Staff of the Italian Navy from 1948 to 1955.

== Early life ==
Ferreri was born in Rome on 28 December 1894. He was admitted to the Naval Academy of Livorno in 1911. After taking part in the Italo-Turkish War as a cadet officer, he graduated in 1914 with the rank of ensign.

== World War I ==
During the World War I Ferreri participated in naval operations in the Adriatic, serving on the battleship Giulio Cesare and later on the scout cruiser Sparviero, earning a War Cross for Military Valor and being promoted to the rank of sub-lieutenant in 1917.

In 1920 he was executive officer on the protected cruiser Etna, on an international mission to Novorossijsk on the Black Sea, and distinguished himself during the tumultuous departure of the ship under the fire of Soviet artillery, earning his first Silver Medal of Military Valor. In 1924, with the rank of lieutenant, he was in command of the submarine F 6, and in 1928-1929, after promotion to lieutenant commander, he commanded the destroyer Ostro.

After promotion to captain, he was in command of the heavy cruisers Fiume and Zara and held important positions abroad, including that of Naval Attaché in Paris between 1935 and 1937 and, upon returning to Italy, between from 1937 to 1939, the post of chief of staff of the 1st Fleet.

== World War II ==
When Italy entered World War II, Ferreri was assigned to Supermarina at the Merchant Traffic Protection Office, and in November 1940, he was promoted to rear admiral. In January 1942, he became Chief of Staff of the Commander-in-Chief of the Naval Battle Forces, a position he held, after promotion to vice admiral in July 1942, until May 1943, when he was transferred to the Supreme Command to assume the direction of the Traffic Office. For the activity carried out during this period, he was awarded the Knight's Cross of the Military Order of Italy and a War Cross for Military Valour.

On 30 July 1943, Minister of the Navy Raffaele de Courten appointed Ferrari secretary-general of the Navy Ministry. He was in Rome when the Armistice of Cassibile was announced on 8 September 1943, and remained in the capital even after its occupation by German forces. On 14 September he assumed the post of commissioner for the Navy for the open city of Rome, which however he only held until 30 September, when he went into hiding (being replaced as navy commissioner of the open city by Admiral Mario Falangola, favourable to collaboration with the Germans) and joined the Clandestine Military Front, becoming head of its naval faction. During the German occupation, he coordinated the activities of various Resistance groups, including through counter-espionage activities, making use of a large group of officers and non-commissioned officers who had refused to join the Italian Social Republic. At the liberation of Rome he was awarded a Silver Medal of Military Valor.

In August 1944, he was appointed Superior Commander of the cruisers, with Eugenio di Savoia as flagship, leaving that position in October 1946, when he was again appointed Secretary General of the Navy.

== Postwar period ==
He was promoted to admiral on 1 January 1947, and on 4 November 1948, he was appointed Chief of Staff of the Navy, a position he held until 10 August 1955. During this long period, Ferreri devoted all his energies to the reorganization of the Italian Navy, decimated by war losses and by the clauses of the Paris Peace Treaty, laying the foundations for the subsequent renovation and reconstruction work that would be continued by his successors. In 1950 the first post-war naval program was realized under his leadership.

== Later life ==
Ferreri died in Rome on 27 August 1981.
