= Branciforte (disambiguation) =

Branciforte may refer to:

- The Branciforte family, an Italian and, later, Spanish noble family
- Miguel de la Grúa Talamanca, 1st Marquis of Branciforte (1755-1812), was a Spanish military officer and 53rd Viceroy of New Spain, after whom the pueblo of Branciforte was named
- Branciforte, was the last of only three secular pueblos founded by the Spanish colonial government of Alta California, and is now part of the city of Santa Cruz, California
- Branciforte County, California, the original name of Santa Cruz County, California
- Bruno Branciforte (born 1947), an Italian admiral
