= Lertora =

Lertora is an Italian surname. Notable people with the surname include:

- Federico Lértora (born 1990), Argentine footballer
- Giuseppe Lertora (born 1946), Italian admiral
- Mario Lertora (1897–1939), Italian artistic gymnast
