= Guido Venturoni =

Italian Navy officer (1934–2025)

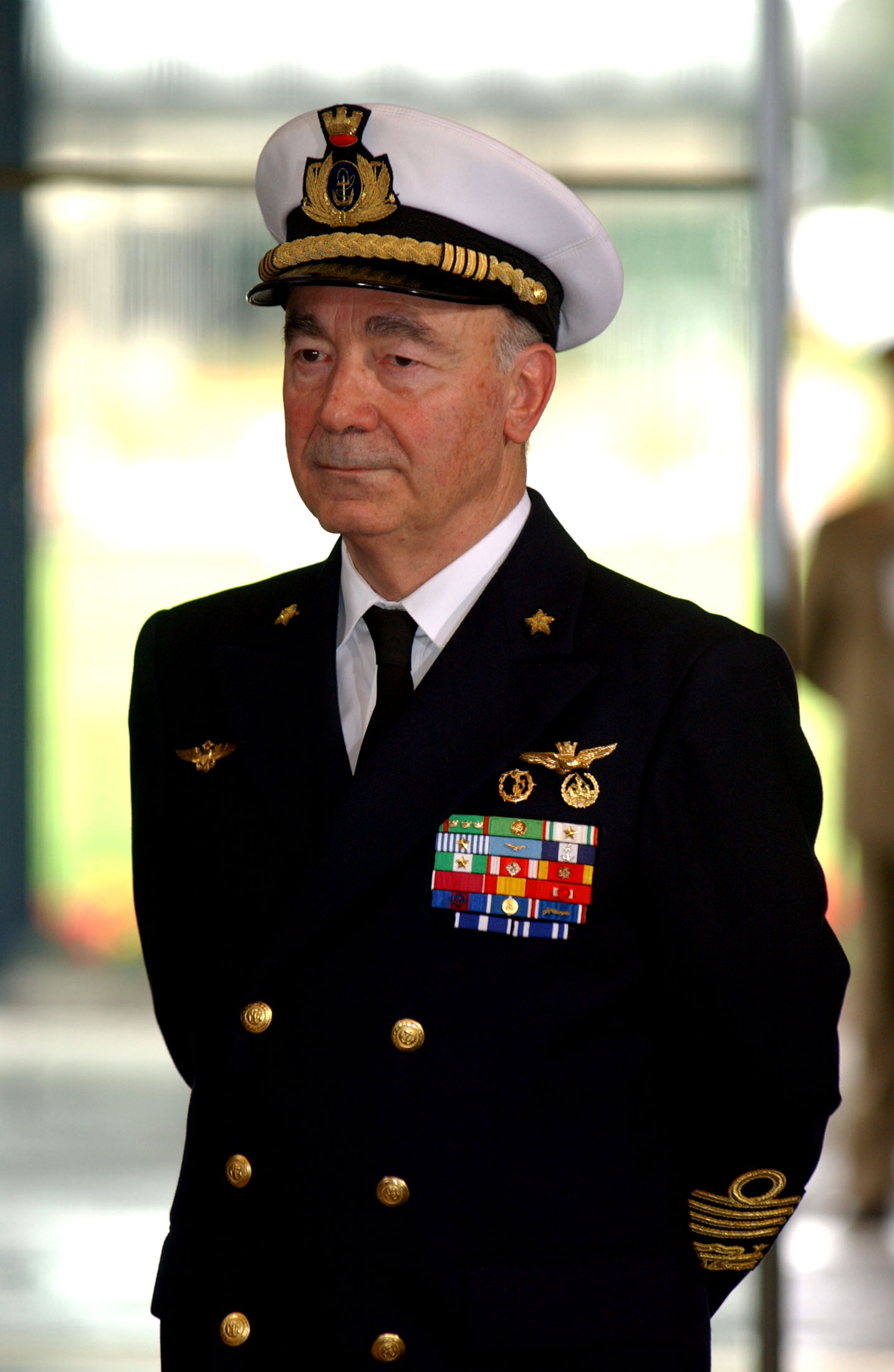
- Venturoni in 2002
- Born: 10 April 1934; Teramo, Italy
- Died: 2 November 2025 (aged 91); Rome, Italy
- Military career
- Allegiance: Italy
- Branch: Italian Navy
- Service years: 1952–2002
- Rank: Admiral
- Commands: Chief of the Defence Staff; Chairman of the NATO Military Committee; Chief of Staff of the Italian Navy

Admiral Guido Venturoni (10 April 1934 – 2 November 2025) was an Italian Navy officer who served as Chief of the Defence Staff before being appointed Chairman of the NATO Military Committee.

== Biography ==
Venturoni served as Chief of Staff of the Italian Navy from 1992 to 1993 and from 1 January 1994 until 15 February 1999 served as Chief of the Italian Defence General Staff.

He was appointed Chairman of the NATO Military Committee on 6 May 1999 and retired in 2002.

After his retirement he joined Leonardo-Finmeccanica as a Director and later Vice Chairman.

Venturoni died on 2 November 2025, at the age of 91.
