= Giuseppe de Giorgi =

Italian admiral and naval aviator

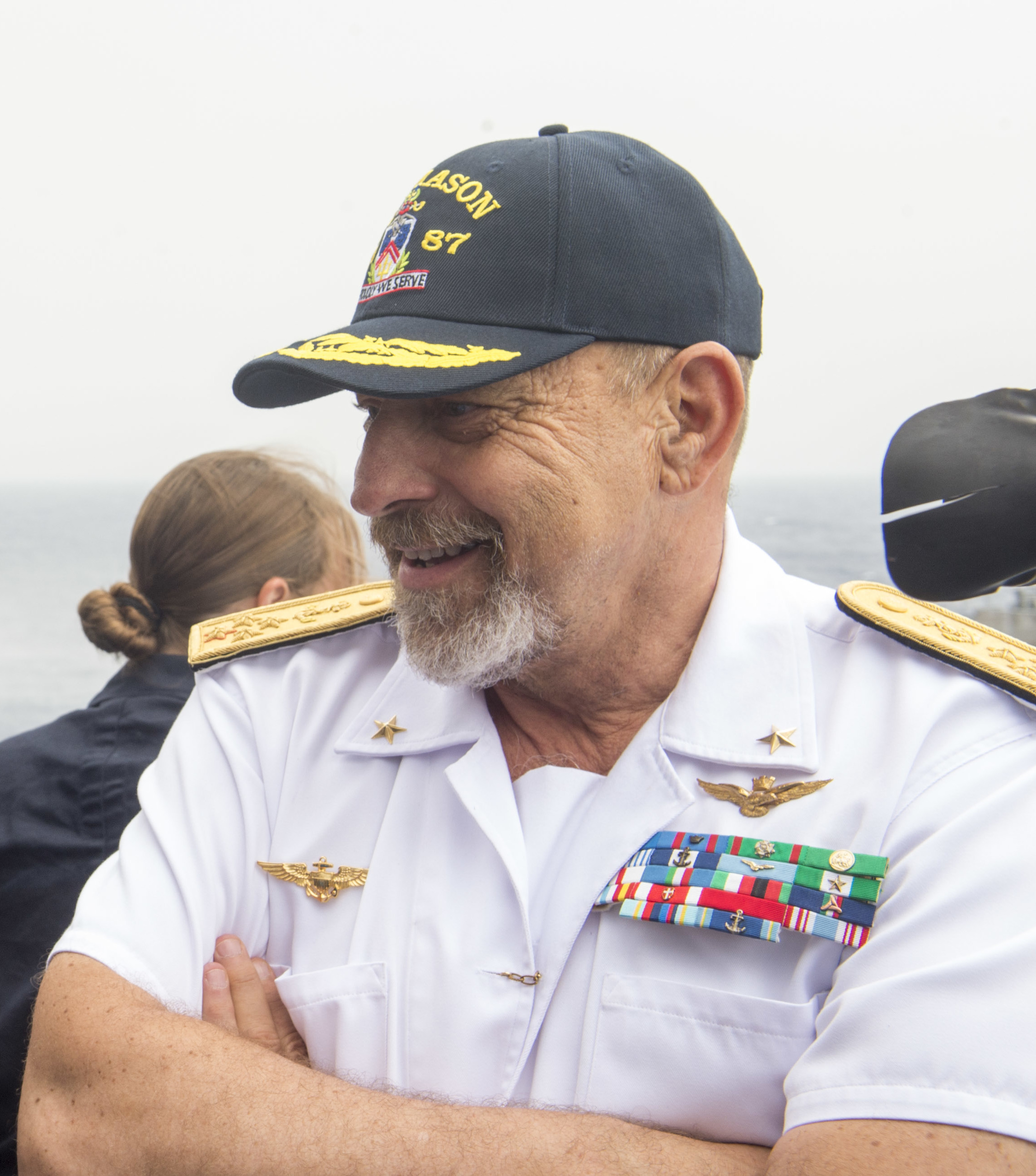
- Born: 21 June 1953 (age 73); Naples, Italy
- Military career
- Allegiance: Italy
- Branch: Italian Navy
- Service years: 1975–2016
- Rank: Admiral
- Commands: Chief of Staff of the Italian Navy (2013–2016); Commander in Chief Naval Fleet (2012–2013); ITS Vittorio Veneto (1997–1999)
- Conflicts: Iran–Iraq War; United Nations Interim Force in Lebanon
- Awards: Knight Grand Cross of the Order of Merit of the Italian Republic; Officer of the Military Order of Italy; Order of Merit of Lebanon 3rd Class

Giuseppe de Giorgi (born 21 June 1953) is an Italian admiral and naval aviator. He was Chief of Staff of the Italian Navy from 28 January 2013 to 22 June 2016. He was Commander of the Maritime Task Force of the United Nations Interim Force in Lebanon (UNIFIL) from August 2006 to October 2006. He then became Chief of Staff of the Italian Joint Operations Headquarter, a position he held from 2007 to 2009, before serving as Chief of Staff to the Commander of the Italian Naval Fleet from 2009 to 2011. He served as Commander in Chief Naval Fleet from February 2012 to January 2013.

Among the different crises he had to face during his tenure as Chief of the Italian Navy were the rescue of the MS Norman Atlantic and the management of Operation Mare Nostrum.

De Giorgi attended the Italian Naval Academy in Livorno, where he graduated in 1975 with the rank of ensign. He was then selected to attend advanced military courses in the United States at the Naval Air Station Pensacola and the Naval Air Station Corpus Christi, where he graduated as a naval aviator in 1976. He was the Commander of the ITS Vittorio Veneto from 1997 to 1999.

== Collaboration with Sea Shepherd ==
In 2017, he embarked on the fleet of Sea Shepherd Conservation Society, the international non-profit organization that has been fighting since 1977 to protect the environment and the animals of the sea. With Sea Shepherd, De Giorgi participated in Operation Albacore to stop illegal fishing along the coasts of Central-Eastern Africa.

== Honors and awards ==
Knight Grand Cross of the Order of Merit of the Italian Republic – awarded on 20 December 2012
Officer of the Military Order of Italy – awarded on 8 June 2007
Order of Merit of Lebanon 3rd Class – awarded on 16 October 2006
Maurician Medal to the Military Merit of Ten Lustrums
Officer Cross with Swords pro Merito Melitensi
Knight of the National Order of the Legion of Honour

Military offices
Preceded by Luigi Binelli Mantelli	Chief of Staff of the Italian Navy; 2013–2016	Succeeded by Valter Girardelli
Preceded by Luigi Binelli Mantelli	Commander in Chief Naval Fleet; 2012–2013	Succeeded by Filippo Maria Foffi
