= Ghirardelli (surname) =

Ghirardelli is a surname. Notable people with the surname include:

- Domingo Ghirardelli (1817–1894), American businessman
- Stefano Ghirardelli (1633–1708), Italian Roman Catholic bishop

== See also ==
- Girardelli
