= Arturo Riccardi =

Italian admiral (1878–1966)

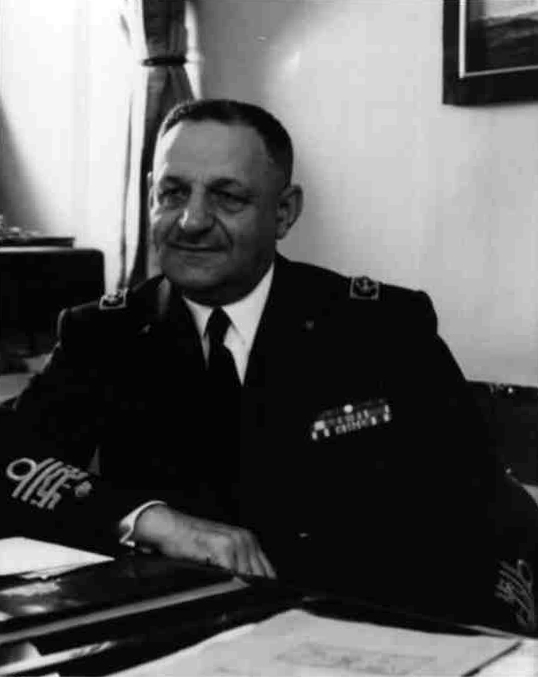

Chief of Staff of the Regia Marina
- In office 11 December 1940 – 25 July 1943
- Preceded by: Domenico Cavagnari
- Succeeded by: Raffaele de Courten

Personal details
- Born: 30 October 1878 Pavia, Italy
- Died: 20 December 1966 (aged 88) Rome, Italy
- Awards: Grand Officer of the Order of Saints Maurice and Lazarus; War Merit Cross

Military service
- Allegiance: Kingdom of Italy
- Branch/service: Regia Marina
- Rank: Ammiraglio d'armata (Admiral)
- Commands: Chief of Staff of the Regia Marina
- Battles/wars: Boxer Rebellion; Far East Campaign; World War I World War II

Arturo Riccardi (30 October 1878 – 20 December 1966) was an Italian admiral during the Second World War, serving as the Ministry of Marine Director General of Personnel from 1935 to 1940 and Under Secretary of State of the Navy from 1941 until 1943. A specialist of aerial warfare, Riccardi frequently worked with senior German naval officers on the defense of the Italian peninsula.

== Early career ==
Born to Adolph Riccardi and Ifigenia Rasini Di Mortigliengo, Riccardi attended the Italian military academy.

== Interwar years ==
Heading the Cabinet to the Ministry of Navy from 6 February until 13 May 1925, Riccardi was made an admiral on 8 September 1932. Following his admission into the La Spezia (PNF) political party in 1934, he was promoted to vice admiral on 27 December 1935.

His subsequent positions include Ministry of Marine Director General of Personnel.

== Second World War ==
Riccardi's first major engagement took place at the Battle of Taranto, when British carrier-borne torpedo bombers delivered a devastating surprise attack against Italian naval targets in the harbor of Taranto on the night of 11–12 November 1940.

Succeeding Admiral Domenico Cavagnari as chief of staff of the Italian Royal Navy (Regia Marina) on 11 December 1940, Riccardi became de facto commander of the existing Ministries for wartime aviation and naval forces. Riccardi did this in addition to his position as the Department of the Navy's Undersecretary of State.

Meeting with representatives of the Nazi Germany's Kriegsmarine, Riccardi led the Italian Royal Navy delegation, along with Raffaele de Courten, Emilio Brenta, and Carlo Giartosio during the Conference of Merano, from 13 February to 14 February 1941.

Riccardi was forced to surrender both positions on 25 July 1943, following the downfall of Italian dictator Benito Mussolini's fascist regime. Under the new Pietro Badoglio administration, Raffaele de Courten officially succeeded Riccardi as Naval Minister.
