= Commemorative Medal for the Italo-Turkish War 1911–1912 =

Italian military award

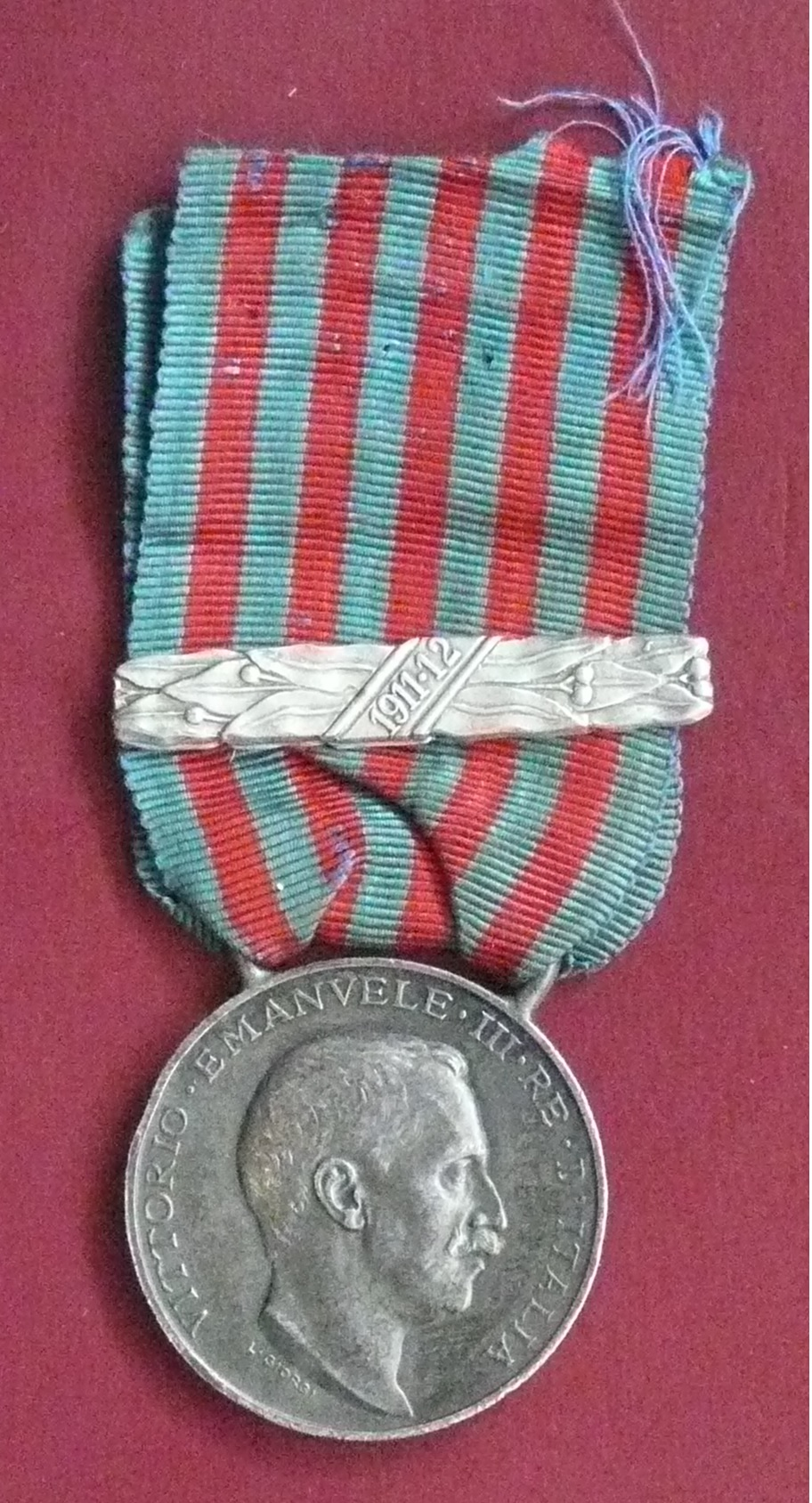
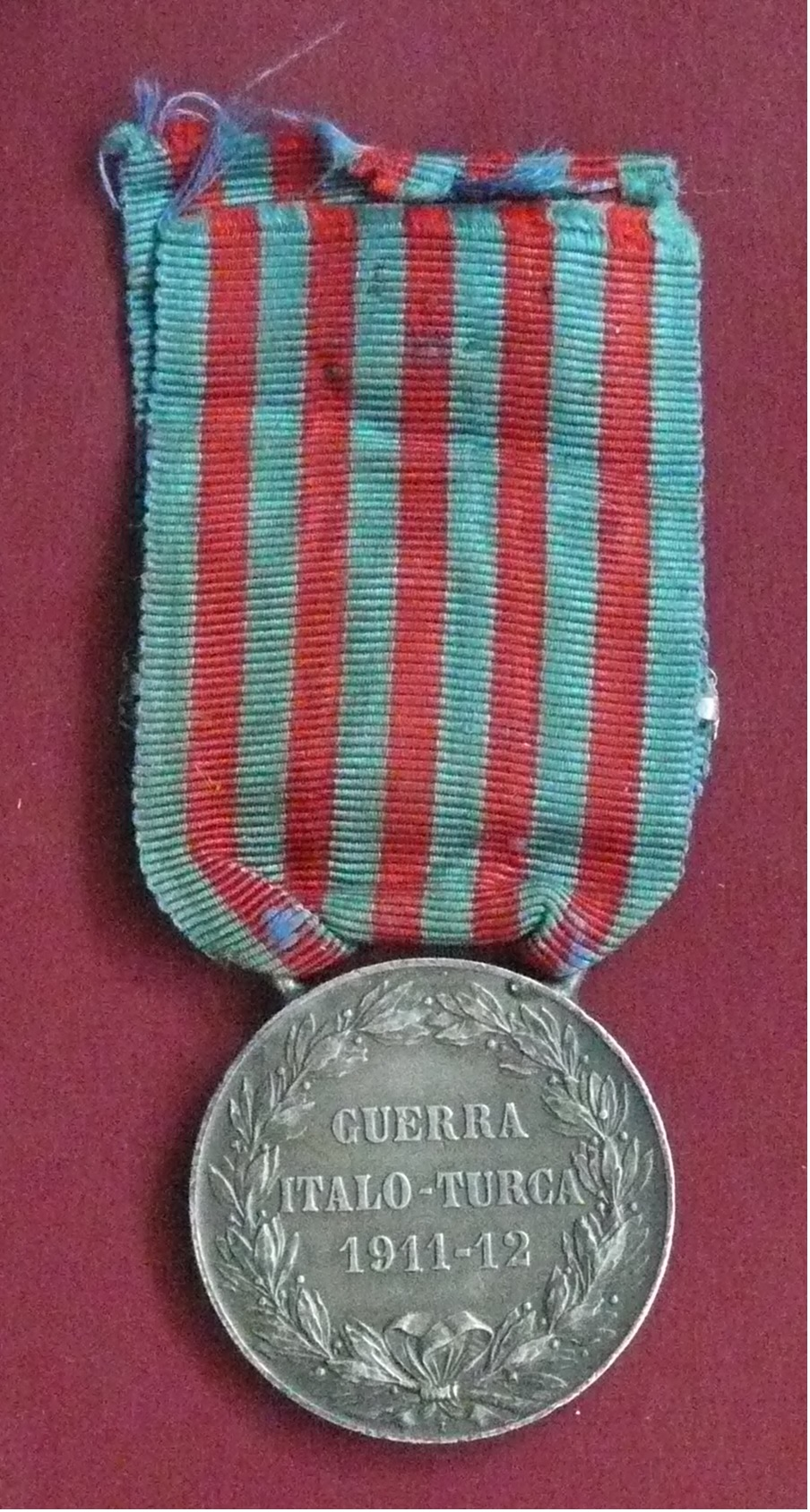
- The obverse (left) and reverse of the medal
- Type: Commemorative medal
- Awarded for: Service during the Italo-Turkish War of 1911–1912
- Presented by: Kingdom of Italy
- Clasps: 1911, 1911–1912, 1912
- Status: Abolished 10 February 2011
- Established: 12 January 1913
- Ribbon of the medal

The Commemorative Medal for the Italo-Turkish War 1911–12 was a decoration granted by the Kingdom of Italy to personnel who participated in the Italo-Turkish War of 1911–1912. It was abolished in 2011 after the Italian Republic deemed it obsolete.

== History ==
The Kingdom of Italy and Ottoman Empire fought the Italo-Turkish War from 29 September 1911 to 18 October 1912. To commemorate participation in the conflict, King Victor Emmanuel III of Italy established the Commemorative Medal for the Italo-Turkish War 1911–1912 by royal decree on 21 November 1912. The decree went into effect on 12 January 1913.

After deeming the medal obsolete, the Italian Republic abolished it on 10 February 2011.

== Eligibiity ==
Italian and colonial military personnel and civilians were eligible for the medal if they served in the Italo-Turkish War between 29 September 1911, when Italy declared war on the Ottoman Empire, and 18 October 1912, when Italy and the Ottoman Empire signed the First Treaty of Lausanne, often called the Treaty of Ouchy, which ended the conflict.

== Appearance ==
=== Medal ===
The medal consisted of a silver disc 32 millimetres (1¼ inches) in diameter bearing on the obverse the face of King Victor Emmanuel III facing right, encircled by the inscription "VITTORIO • EMANUELE • III • RE • D' • ITALIA" (English: VICTOR • EMMANUEL • III • KING • OF • ITALY). The signature of the engraver, Luigi Giorgi, was under the king's neck. On the reverse was the inscription "GUERRA ITALO-TURCA 1911-1912" (English: ITALIAN-TURKISH WAR 1911-1912) surrounded by two laurel branches in the form of a crown. Although medals manufactured at the Rome mint were made of silver, other companies who obtained the minting contract made some of the medals silvered bronze rather than silver.

The Commemorative Medal of the Libyan Campaigns, created in 1913, was virtually identical to the Commemorative Medal for the Italo-Turkish War 1911–1912, differing only in the inscription on the reverse.

=== Ribbon ===
The ribbon was made up of six blue stripes alternating with five dark red stripes.

The ribbon of the Commemorative Medal of the Libyan Campaigns, created in 1913, was identical.

=== Clasps ===
Bronze clasps were authorized for the ribbon to represent the years of the campaign in which the recipient of the medal served. Three clasps were authorized, for "1911", "1911–12", and "1912". In some cases, recipients of the Commemorative Medal of the Libyan Campaigns, which differed from the Commemorative Medal for the Italo-Turkish War 1911–1912 only in its motto and had an identical ribbon, were authorized to wear clasps commemorating those campaigns with the Commemorative Medal for the Italo-Turkish War 1911–1912.
