= Luigi Binelli Mantelli =

Italian admiral

Luigi Mario Binelli Mantelli
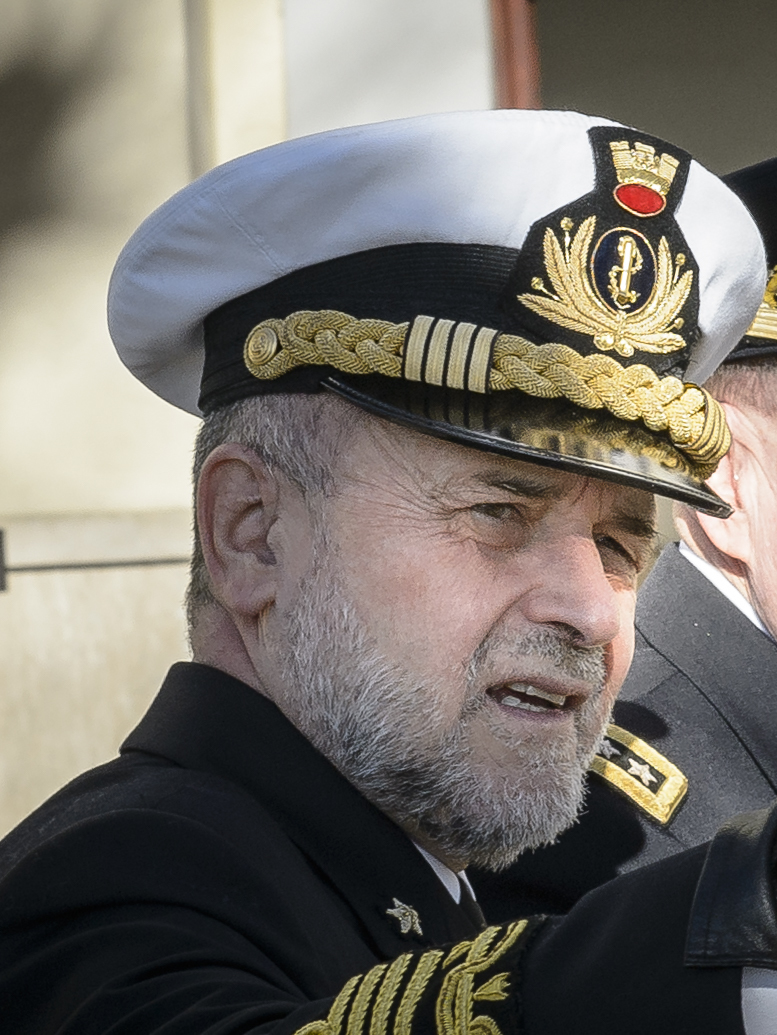
- Born: 4 December 1950 (age 75); Breno, Italy
- Military career
- Allegiance: Italy
- Branch: Italian Navy
- Service years: 1973–2015
- Rank: Admiral of the fleet
- Commands: Chief of Staff of the Italian Navy (2012–2013); Chief of the Defence Staff of Italy(2013–2015)
- Conflicts: United Nations Operation in Somalia II
- Awards: Knight Grand Cross of the Order of Merit of the Italian Republic

Luigi Mario Binelli Mantelli (born 4 December 1950) is an Italian admiral. He was Chief of Staff of the Italian Navy from 2 March 2012 to 28 January 2013 and Chief of the Defence Staff of Italy from 31 January 2013 to 28 February 2015.

In 1995 he took part to the United Nations Operations in Somalia II (UNOSOM II).

Binelli Mantelli attended the Francesco Morosini Naval School in Venice, Italy and the Italian Naval Academy in Livorno where he graduated with the rank of navy guard in 1973.

== Biography ==
He was born in Val Camonica where his family, of Piedmontese origin, had moved to follow his grandfather, who was appointed director of the Cedegolo hydroelectric power plant. He attended the Francesco Morosini Naval Military School in Venice and the Naval Academy in Livorno from 1969 to 1973, when he embarked on the destroyer Audace, later transferring to the Ardito in 1974–76. After receiving command of several ships (see fact sheet), he participated in the United Nations Operation in Somalia II in 1995.

From October 1999 to October 2001, he was the first commander of the Italian Naval Group (COMGRUPNAVIT) and (since October 30, 2000) Commander of the Italian-Spanish Amphibious Force (COMSIAF). He was promoted to rear admiral on July 1, 1998, Divisional admiral on July 1, 2002, and Squadron admiral on July 1, 2007. From March 10, 2004, to April 18, 2007, he was Chief of the General Office of the Chief of the Defence Staff. From April 30, 2007, to April 20, 2009, he served as Chief of Staff of the Italian Navy. Since that date, he has been commander in chief of the Commander in Chief Naval Fleet and Commander of the European Maritime Force.

He was appointed Chief of Staff of the Italian Navy on January 21, 2012. The handover ceremony between Binelli Mantelli and his predecessor Bruno Branciforte took place on March 2, 2012 at Palazzo Marina, Rome. On December 6, 2012, he was appointed by the Monti government as the new Chief of the Defence Staff (Italy); promoted to Admiral(NATO rank OF-10), he took office on January 31, 2013. He left the post to General Claudio Graziano on February 28, 2015.

== Honors and awards ==
Knight Grand Cross of the Order of Merit of the Italian Republic – awarded on 27 January 2012

Military offices
Preceded by Biagio Abrate	Chief of Staff of the Italian Armed Forces; 2013 – 2015	Succeeded by Claudio Graziano
Preceded by Bruno Branciforte	Chief of the Italian Navy; 2012–2013	Succeeded by Giuseppe De Giorgi
Preceded by Giuseppe Lertora	Commander in Chief Naval Fleet; 2009 – 2012	Succeeded by Giuseppe De Giorgi
