= Paolo La Rosa =

Italian Navy officer

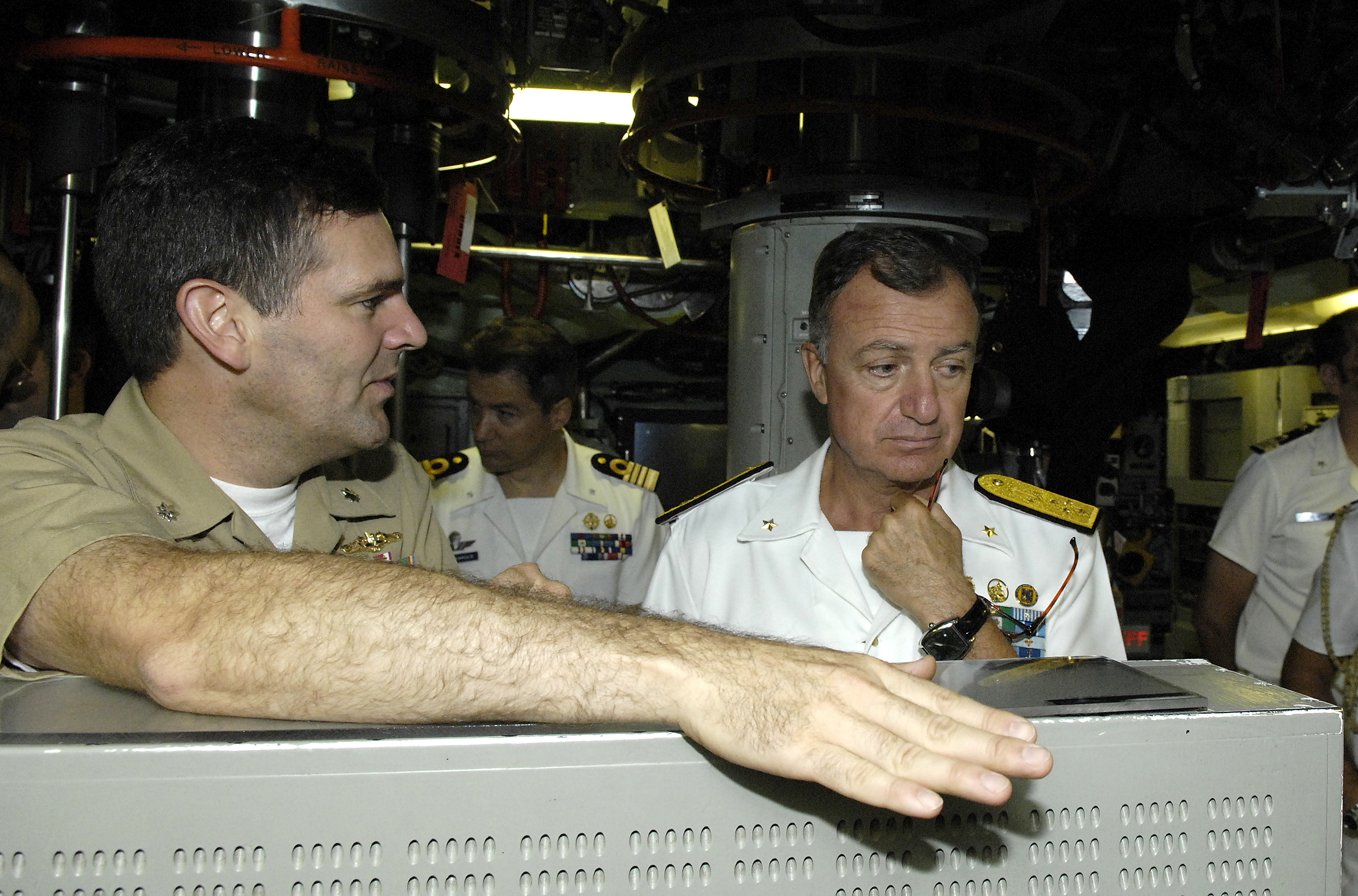
- Born: 25 January 1947 (age 79); Bologna, Italy
- Military career
- Allegiance: Italy
- Branch: Italian Navy
- Rank: Vice Admiral
- Commands: Chief of Staff of the Italian Navy

Vice Admiral Paolo La Rosa is a retired Italian Navy officer who served as Chief of Staff of the Italian Navy.

Military offices
Preceded by Sergio Biraghi	Chief of Staff of the Italian Navy; 2006–2010	Succeeded by Bruno Branciforte
