= Commemorative Medal of the Libyan Campaigns =

Italian military award

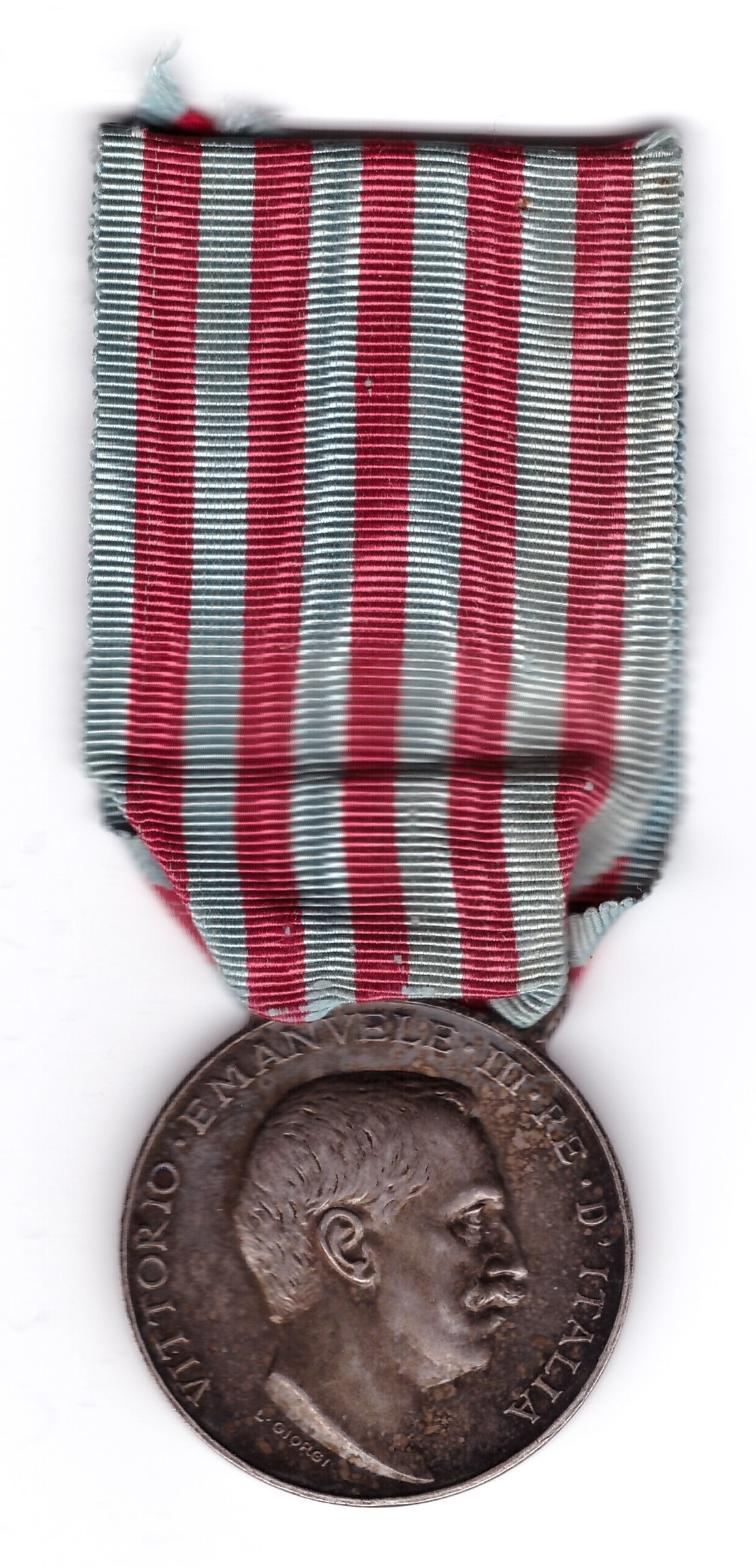
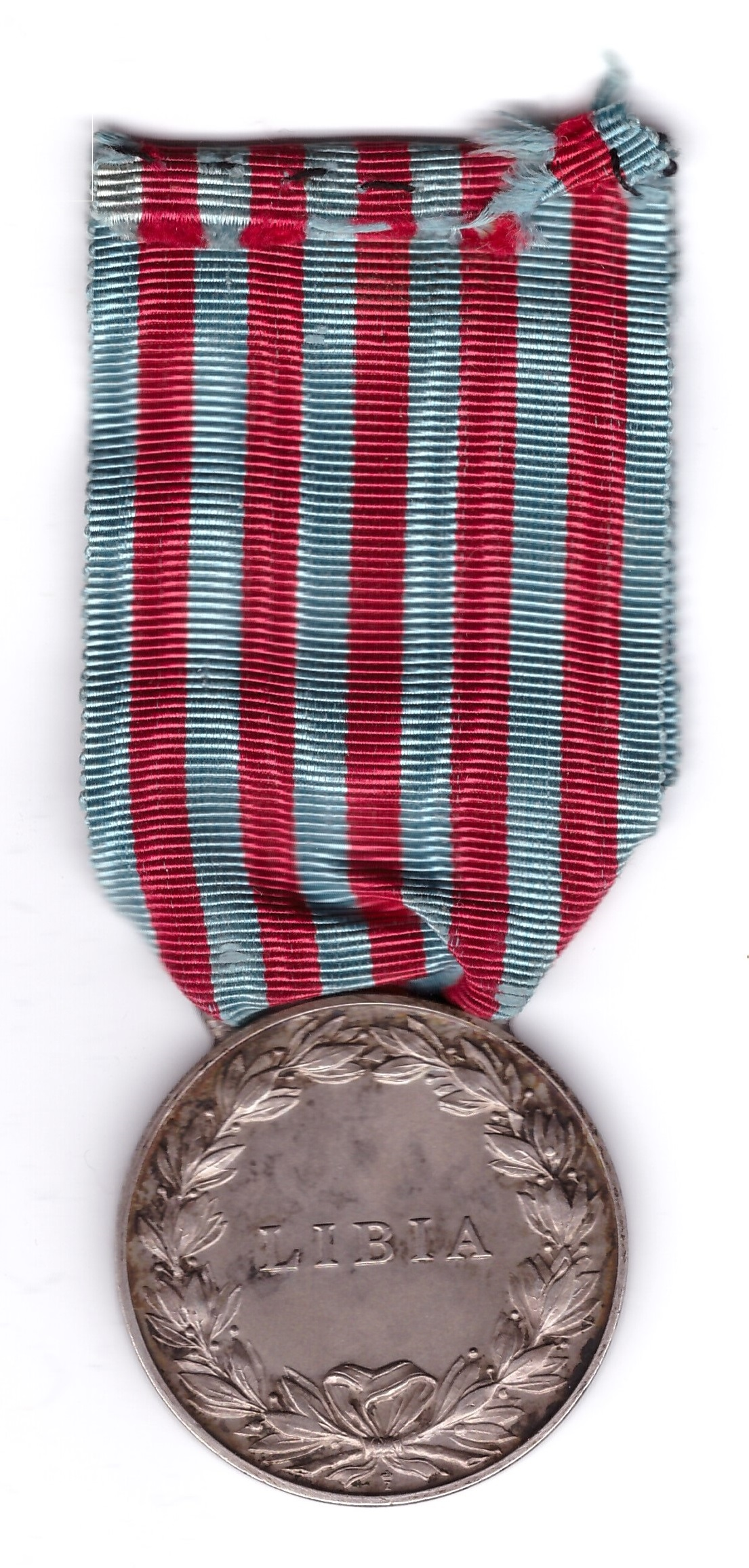
- The obverse (left) and reverse of the medal
- Type: Commemorative medal
- Awarded for: Service in Libya between 1912 and 1931
- Presented by: Kingdom of Italy
- Clasps: 1912, 1912–13, 1913, Fezzan/913, 1913–14, Fezzan/913–914, 1914, Fezzan/914, 1914-15, 1915, Tripolitania/1915, 1915–16, 1916, 1916–17, 1917, 1917–18, 1918, 1918–19, 1919, 1919–20, 1920, 1920–21, 1921, 1922, 1923, 1924, 1925, 1926, 1927, Tripolitania 1927–1928, 1928, 1929, Tripolitania 1929-1930, 1930, 1931
- Status: Abolished 10 February 2011
- Established: 19 October 1913
- Ribbon of the medal

The Commemorative Medal of the Libyan Campaigns was a decoration granted by the Kingdom of Italy to personnel who served in military campaigns in Libya after the conclusion of the Italo-Turkish War of 1911–1912. It was abolished in 2011 after the Italian Republic deemed it obsolete.

== History ==
King Victor Emmanuel III of Italy established the Commemorative Medal of the Libyan Campaigns with a royal decree of 6 September 1913 to commemorate participation in military campaigns in Libya subsequent to the Kingdom of Italy′s acquisition of that colony upon the defeat of the Ottoman Empire in the Italo-Turkish War of 1911–1912. The decree went into effect on 19 October 1913.

After deeming the medal obsolete, the Italian Republic abolished it on 10 February 2011.

== Eligibiity ==
Personnel of the Italian Royal Army (Italian: Regio Esercito), colonial troops of the Italian Empire, and the civilian and military personnel of the Italian Regia Marina ("Royal Navy") who participated in military campaigns in Libya after the end of the Italo-Turkish War in 1912 were eligible for the Commemorative Medal of the Libyan Campaigns.

== Appearance ==
=== Medal ===
The medal consisted of a silver disc 32 millimetres (1¼ inches) in diameter bearing on the obverse the face of King Victor Emmanuel III facing right, encircled by the inscription "VITTORIO • EMANUELE • III • RE • D' • ITALIA" (English: VICTOR • EMMANUEL • III • KING • OF • ITALY), with the signature of the engraver, Luigi Giorgi, under the king's neck. On the reverse was the inscription "LIBIA" (English: LIBYA) surrounded by two laurel branches in the form of a crown. Although the medals manufactured by the Rome mint were made of silver, some of the medals made by other companies who obtained the minting contract were made of silvered bronze rather than silver.

The medal was identical to the Commemorative Medal for the Italo-Turkish War 1911–1912 except for the inscription on the reverse.

=== Ribbon ===
The ribbon was made up of six blue stripes alternating with five dark red stripes. It was identical to the ribbon of the Commemorative Medal for the Italo-Turkish War 1911–1912.

=== Clasps ===
Bronze clasps were authorized for the ribbon to represent the years of the campaigns in which the recipient of the medal served. Thirty-five clasps were authorized, for "1912", "1912–13", "1913", "Fezzan/913", "1913–14", "Fezzan/913–914", "1914", "Fezzan/914", "1914–15", "1915", "Tripolitania/1915", "1915–16", "1916", "1916–17", "1917", "1917–18", "1918", "1918–19", "1919", "1919–20", "1920", "1920–21", "1921", "1922", "1923", "1924", "1925", "1926", "1927 ", "Tripolitania 1927–1928", "1928", "1929", "Tripolitania 1929–1930", "1930", and "1931". In some cases, recipients of the medal, which differed from the Commemorative Medal for the Italo-Turkish War 1911–1912 only in its motto and had an identical ribbon, were authorized to wear clasps commemorating these campaigns with the Commemorative Medal for the Italo-Turkish War 1911–1912.
