= Rocca Priora =

- Comune
- Comune di Rocca Priora
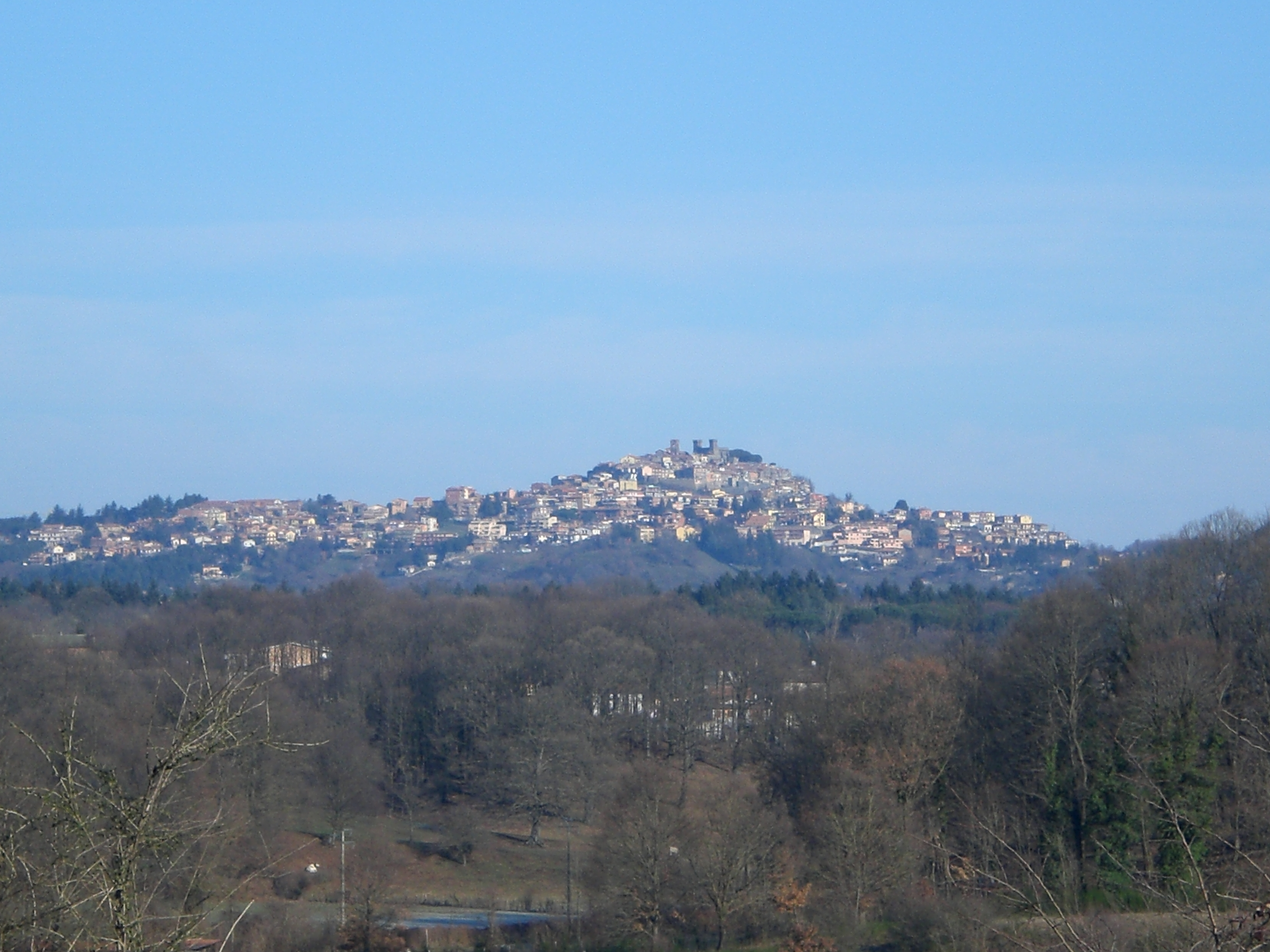
- View of Rocca Priora

- Location within Italy Location within Lazio
- Coordinates: 41°47′N 12°46′E
- Country: Italy
- Region: Lazio
- Metropolitan city: Rome (RM)
- Frazioni: Colle di Fuori

Government
  - Mayor: Anna Gentili

Area
  - Total: 28.27 km^{2} (10.92 sq mi)
- Elevation: 768 m (2,520 ft)

Population (31 May 2015)
  - Total: 12,307
  - Density: 435.3/km^{2} (1,128/sq mi)
- Demonym: Roccaprioresi
- Time zone: UTC+1 (CET)
  - Summer (DST): UTC+2 (CEST)
- Postal code: 00040
- Dialing code: 06
- Patron saint: St. Roch and St. Sebastian
- Saint day: August 16 and January 20
- Website: Official website

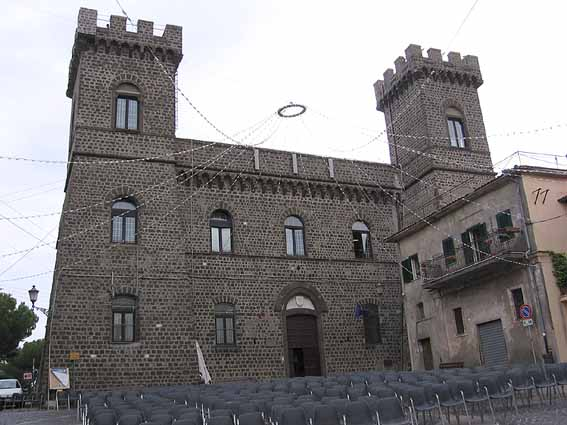
Rocca Priora castle.

Rocca Priora is a small town and comune in the Metropolitan City of Rome, Lazio, Italy. It is one of the Castelli Romani on the Alban Hills about 25 kilometres (16 mi) southeast of Rome, situated in the Regional Park known as the "Parco Regionale dei Castelli Romani".

== History ==
Rocca Priora occupied the area of the old Latin town of Corbium; here several battles, described by ancient historians, were fought by Italic peoples.

After the destruction of Tusculum in 1191, the population increased. In the 14th century the Savelli family rose to prominence in the area, after Pope Sixtus V endorsed Rocca Priora as a feudal possession for them. They held the town and its castle until the 17th century, apart from two short periods in 1436–47 and in the early 16th century, when it went to Cesare Borgia. According to some sources, the town was destroyed by Renzo da Ceri's troops during the conflict between Pope Clement VII and the Colonna, and by the imperial troops in the wake of the Sack of Rome (1527).

After a period as a direct Papal rule, it was sold in part to the Rospigliosi family, who held it until 1870, when it became a commune as part of the newly formed Kingdom of Italy.

== Twin cities ==
- Sohland an der Spree, Germany

== People ==
- Gregorius Maltzeff, painter (1881–1953)
- Marco Amelia, football player (1982)
