= Bruno Branciforte =

Italian admiral

- Born: 6 November 1947 (age 78); Naples, Italy
- Military career
- Allegiance: Italy
- Branch: Italian Navy
- Service years: 1969–2012
- Rank: Vice Admiral
- Commands: Chief of Staff of the Italian Navy (2010–2012)
- Awards: Knight Grand Cross of the Order of Merit of the Italian Republic

Bruno Branciforte (born 6 November 1947) is an Italian admiral. He was Chief of Staff of the Italian Navy from 23 February 2010 to 2 March 2012 and he succeeded to Nicolò Pollari as the last head of the Italian Military Intelligence and Security Service (SISMI), nominated by Prime Minister Romano Prodi, from 21 November to 2006 to 3 August 2007 when the Agency was dissolved and transformed into the Italian External Intelligence and Security Agency (AISE). He was also the first director of AISE from 4 August 2007 to 4 February 2010.

Branciforte attended the Italian Naval Academy in Livorno from 1965 to 1969, when he graduated with the rank of navy guard. From 1976 to 1978, he commanded the Aquila Corvette. In 1979, he was named to the Second Intelligence unit of the chief of staff of the Navy, before being appointed director of the Intelligence Centre of the Navy and then director of the research centre in 1985.

In 1985, he was named Captain of frigate, and quickly became the first commandant of the cruiser Vittorio Veneto, before being named commandant of the Alisea frigate. In 1987, he was again assigned to the chief of staff of the Navy, before being nominated in Washington, D.C., where he worked from 1989 to 1992.

When he returned to Italy, he became commandant of the aircraft carrier Giuseppe Garibaldi. Promoted Rear Admiral in 1995, he was from 15 December 2001 to 12 February 2002 Italy's representative at Tampa (USA), near the USCENTCOM, during Operation Enduring Freedom in Afghanistan. He became the chief of staff of the Navy from 2001 to 2004

He was promoted Vice-Admiral in February 2004 before being appointed Commander in Chief Naval Fleet on 22 October 2004.

== Honours and awards ==
Knight Grand Cross of the Order of Merit of the Italian Republic – awarded on 2 June 2007

Military offices
Preceded by Paolo La Rosa	Chief of the Italian Navy; 2010–2012	Succeeded by Luigi Binelli Mantelli
Preceded by Quinto Gramellini	Commander in Chief Naval Fleet; 2004 – 2006	Succeeded by Giuseppe Lertora
