= Claudio Graziano =

Italian general (1953–2024)

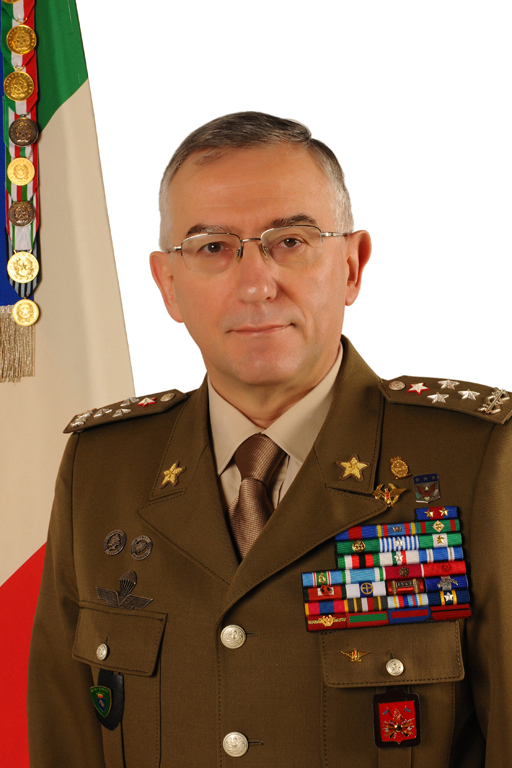
- Graziano in 2011
- Born: 22 November 1953; Turin, Italy
- Died: 17 June 2024 (aged 70); Rome, Italy
- Education: Military Academy of Modena
- Spouse: Marisa Lanucara
- Military career
- Allegiance: Italy; European Union
- Branch: Esercito Italiano
- Service years: 1972–2022
- Rank: General
- Commands: 2nd Alpini Regiment 'Taurinense' Alpine Brigade; UNIFIL; Chief of Staff (Army); Chief of Defence Staff; EU Military Committee
- Conflicts: War in Afghanistan; Iraq War
- Awards: Knight Grand Cross, OMRI; Grand Officer, OMI; Silver Valour Medal (Army); Commander, Legion of Merit; Officer, Legion of Honour

General Claudio Graziano (22 November 1953 – 17 June 2024) was an Italian Army officer who served as Chairman of the European Union Military Committee.

Graziano was a Force Commander of the United Nations Interim Force in Lebanon (UNIFIL), serving in the position between 2007 and 2010. On 6 December 2011, he became the Chief of Staff of the Italian Army. From 28 February 2015 to 6 November 2018, Graziano served as the Chief of Defence Staff of the Italian Armed Forces.

== Early life and education ==
Graziano was born on November 22, 1953, in Turin, Italy. Graziano attended the Military Academy of Modena, from 1972 to 1974, and the Application School of Turin, from 1974 to 1976, where he obtained a degree in Military Strategic Sciences.

== Career ==
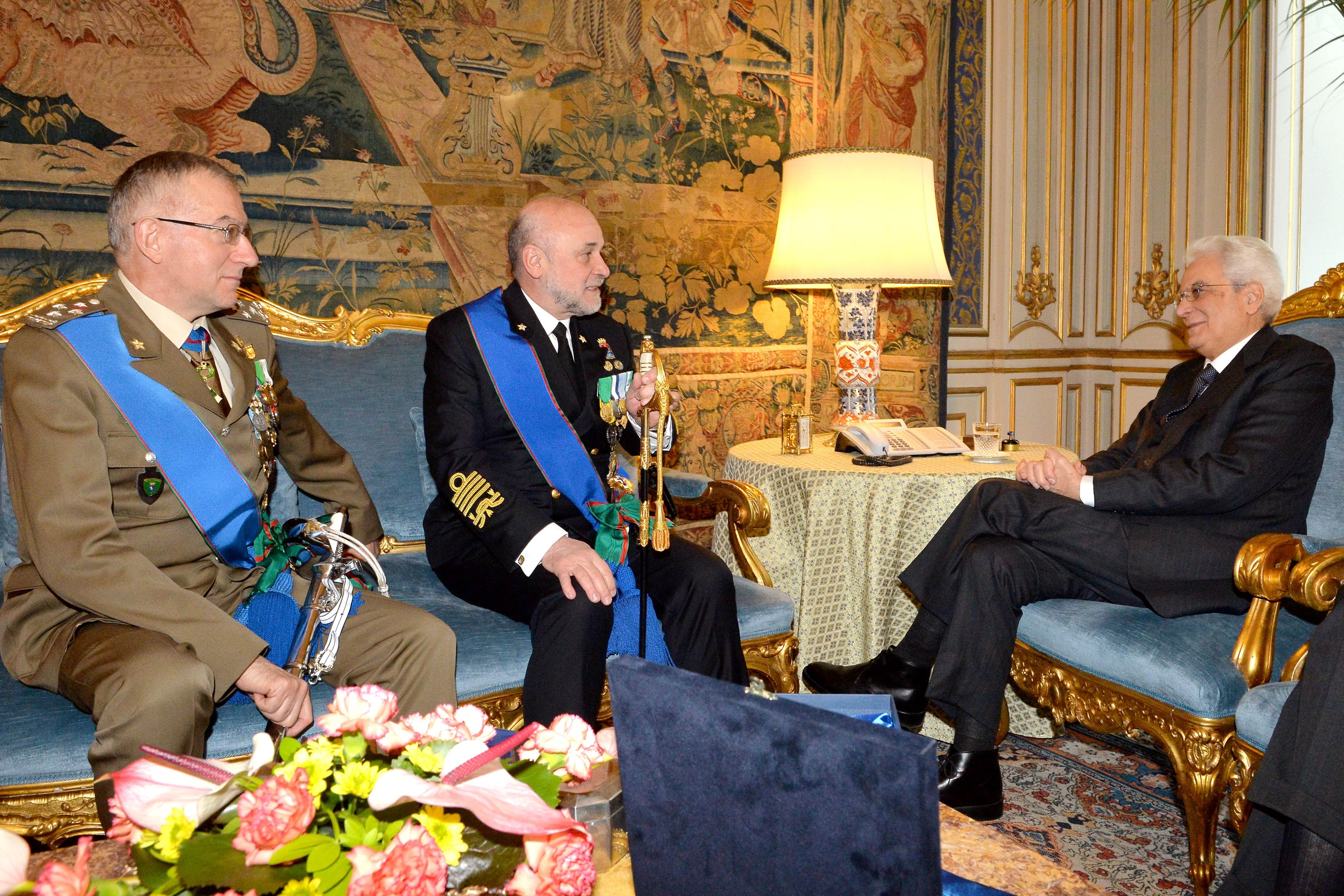
The President of the Italian Republic Sergio Mattarella with Admiral Luigi Binelli Mantelli and General Claudio Graziano, on 27 February 2015

From 16 May 2022 to 17 June 2024 he was President of Fincantieri and from 28 September 2022 he was President of Assonave (Associazione Nazionale dell’industria navalmeccanica).

== Personal life ==
Graziano lived in Rome with his wife Marisa Lanucara, who died in 2023. Graziano had no children.

=== Death, funeral and investigation ===
Graziano was found dead from a gunshot wound in his home in Rome on 17 June 2024. He left a suicide note dedicated to his wife who had died the previous year, in which he stated, "Without Marisa, I've lost my way."

The funeral took place on the morning of June 21, 2024, in the Church of Santa Maria degli Angeli e dei Maritiri, in Piazza della Repubblica, Rome. All the high-ranking members of the Italian Army and the Italian armed forces were lined up for the last tribute, among those present were the President of the Senate of the Italian Republic Ignazio La Russa, the Defense minister Guido Crosetto, the Interior minister Matteo Piantedosi and the Foreign minister Antonio Tajani.

Due to his past in the Italian Army and the important role he held as president of Fincantieri, the necessary investigations into his death were opened. Among the hypotheses examined there was also incitement to suicide by foreign secret agents. Graziano played a key role in strengthening European Defence, which he said can act as a deterrent or can contribute to de-escalation.

== Publications ==
- Missione. Dalla guerra fredda alla difesa europea, with Marco Valerio Lo Prete, Luiss University Press, 2022, ISBN 978-8861057272

Military offices
Preceded by Michail Kostarakos	Chairman of the EU Military Committee; 2018–2022	Succeeded by Robert Brieger
Preceded by Luigi Binelli Mantelli	Chief of the Defence Staff; 2015–2018	Succeeded by Enzo Vecciarelli
Preceded by Giuseppe Valotto	Chief of Staff of the Italian Army; 2011–2015	Succeeded by Danilo Errico
