= Giuseppe Lertora =

Italian military officer (born 1946)

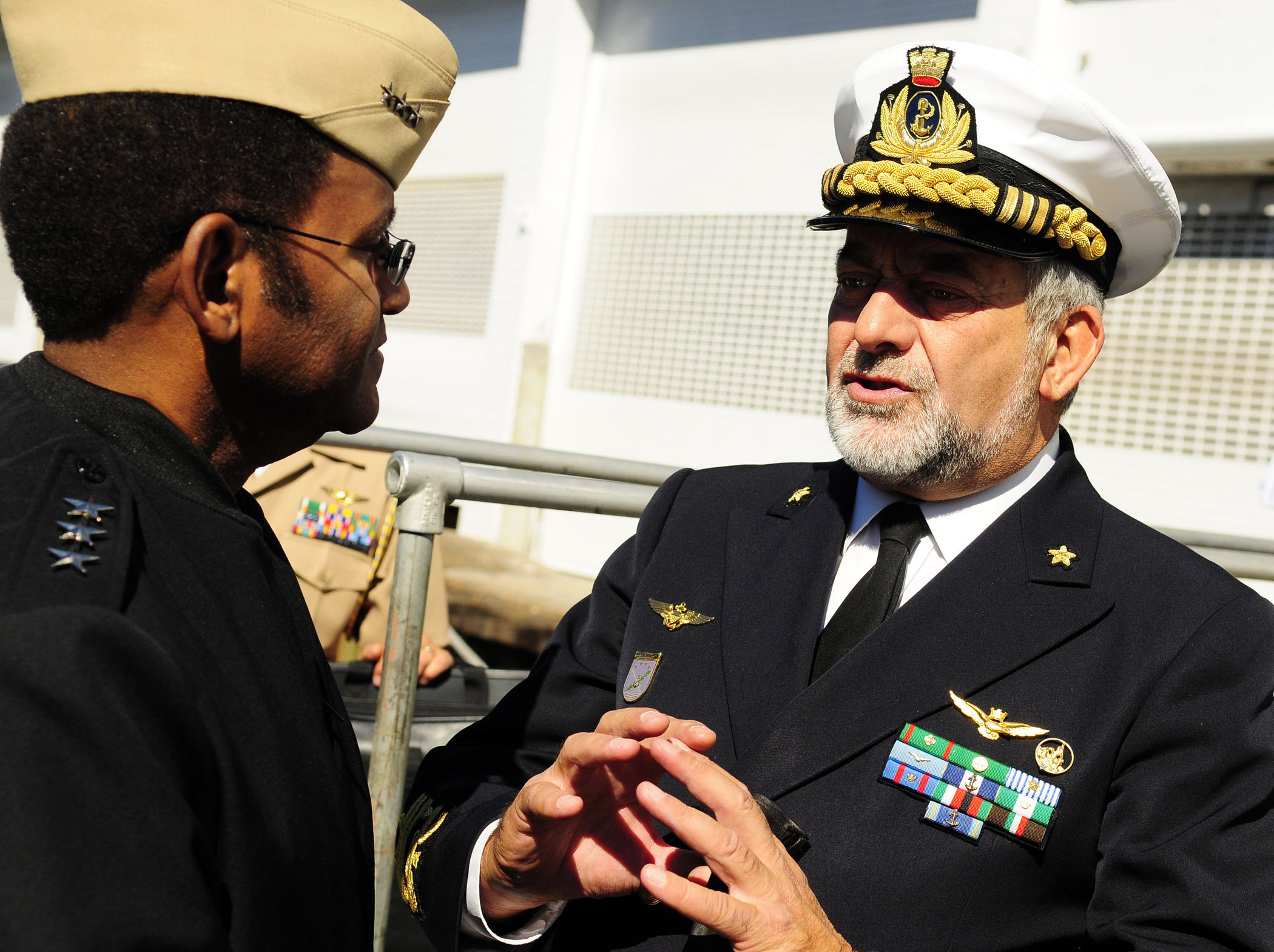
- Born: 19 March 1946 (age 80); Riccò del Golfo
- Military career
- Allegiance: Italy
- Branch: Italian Navy
- Rank: Vice Admiral
- Commands: Commander in Chief Naval Fleet

Vice Admiral Giuseppe Lertora (19 March 1946, Riccò del Golfo) is a retired Italian naval officer who served as Commander in Chief Naval Fleet from 2006 to 2009. Ammiraglio di Squadra Giuseppe Lertona video integrale.

Military offices
Preceded by Bruno Branciforte	Commander in Chief Naval Fleet; 2006 – 2009	Succeeded by Luigi Binelli Mantelli
