= Valter Girardelli =

Italian naval officer

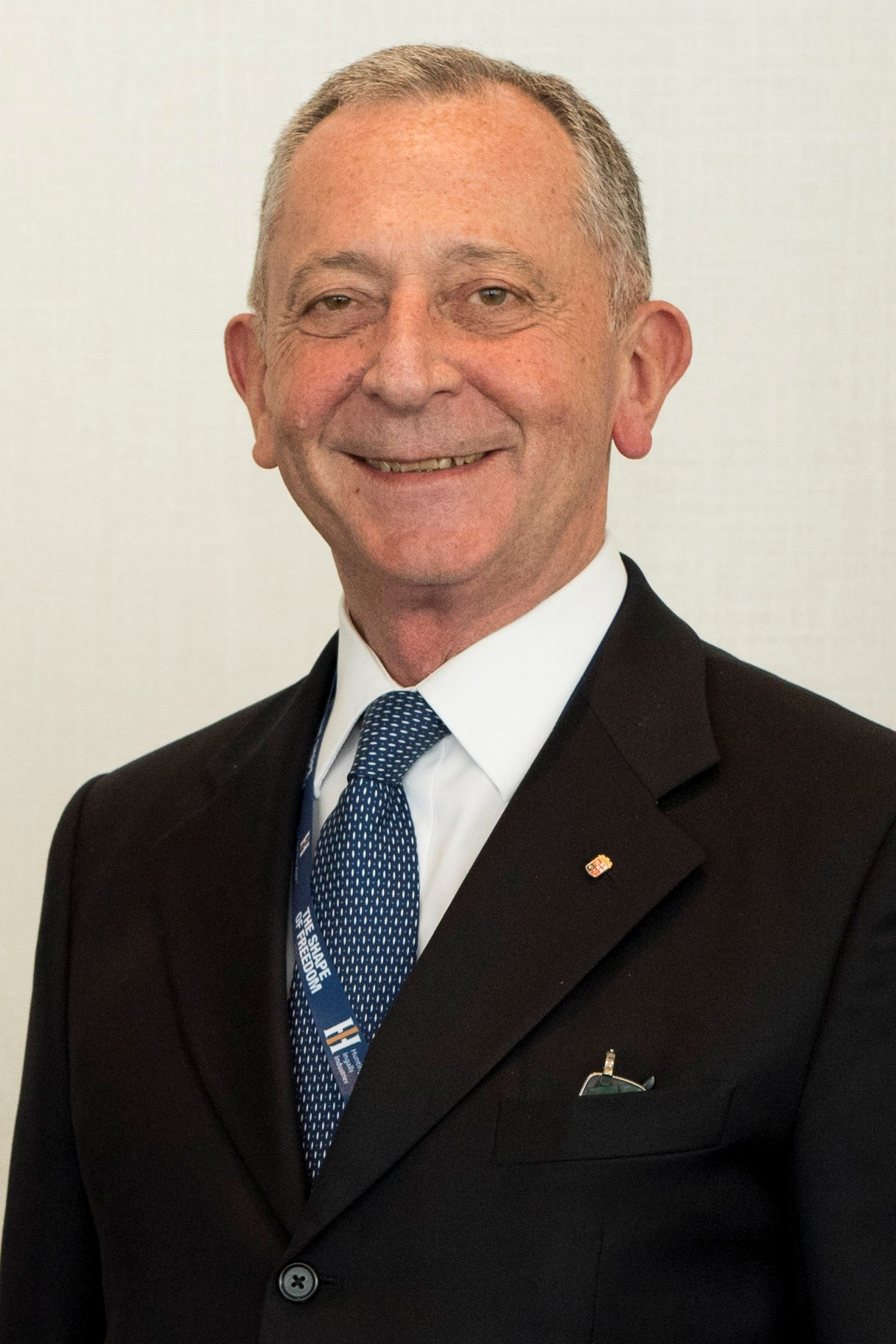
- Born: 22 July 1955 (age 71); Rovereto, Italy
- Military career
- Allegiance: Italy
- Branch: Italian Navy
- Service years: 1975–2019
- Rank: Admiral
- Commands: Chief of Staff of the Italian Navy (2016–2019); ITS Giuseppe Garibaldi (2000–2001); ITS Scirocco F573 (1994–1995)
- Awards: Knight Grand Cross of the Order of Merit of the Italian Republic

Admiral Valter Girardelli (born Rovereto, 22 July 1955) is a retired Italian Naval officer who served as Chief of the Italian Navy from 2016 to 2019.

He joined the navy in 1975 and graduated from the Naval Academy in 1978. He served aboard various ships as an Operations officer. He commanded the ITS Giuseppe Garibaldi from 2000 to 2002.

In 2004 he was appointed to flag rank and held various posts ashore. He was promoted to Vice admiral in 2013 and appointed Deputy Secretary of Defence before becoming Chief of the Cabinet of the Minister of Defence in March 2015.

On 22 June 2016 he was appointed Chief of the Italian Navy. He retired in 2019.

Military offices
| Preceded by Giuseppe De Giorgi | Chief of the Italian Navy; 2016–2019 | Succeeded by Giuseppe Cavo Dragone |
