= Raffaele de Courten =

Italian admiral

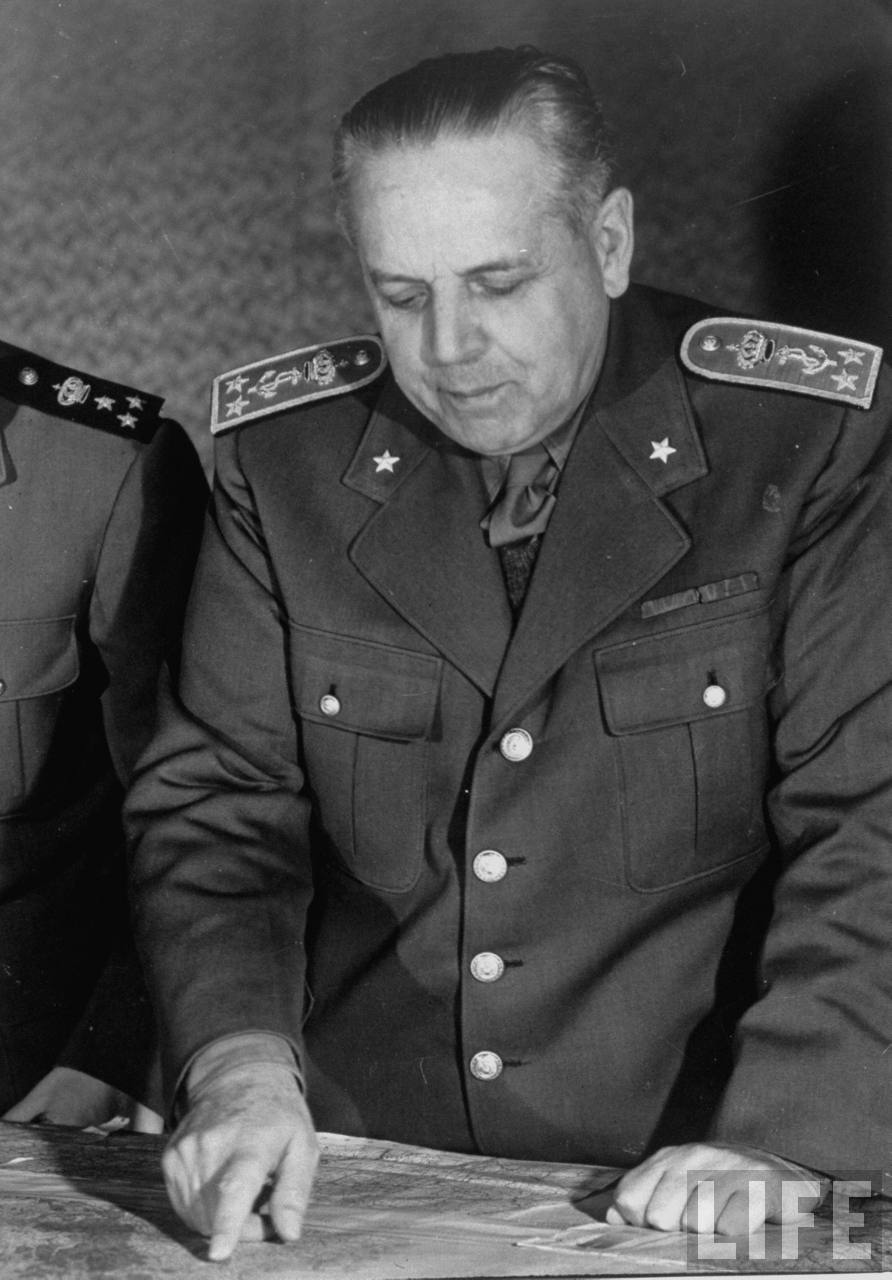

Chief of Staff of the Regia Marina
- In office 25 July 1943 – December 1946
- Preceded by: Arturo Riccardi
- Succeeded by: Office abolished

Personal details
- Born: 23 September 1888 Milan, Lombardy, Italy
- Died: 23 August 1978 (aged 89) Frascati, Latium, Italy
- Awards: Silver Medal of Military Valor

Military service
- Allegiance: Kingdom of Italy
- Branch/service: Regia Marina
- Years of service: 1906–1946
- Rank: Ammiraglio di Squadra (Squadron Admiral)
- Commands: 7th Naval Division; 8th Naval Division; Chief of Staff of the Italian Navy
- Battles/wars: Italo-Turkish War; World War I; Adriatic Campaign; World War II; Battle of the Mediterranean; First Battle of Sirte; Operation Vigorous; Operation Achse

Raffaele de Courten (23 September 1888 in Milan – 23 August 1978 in Frascati) was an Italian admiral. He was the last Chief of Staff of the Italian Regia Marina ("Royal Navy").

== Life ==
Raffaele de Courten was born in Milan in 1888. He entered the Naval Academy of Leghorn (Livorno) in 1906 and graduated in 1910. He served on the battleships Vittorio Emanuele and Benedetto Brin, before joining the naval air arm just before World War I. In May 1915, during a bombardment of Pola on board the airship Città di Jesi, he was captured when the airship was shot down and remained a prisoner of the Austro-Hungarian Army until June 1917. After the war, he was assigned to the Naval Staff, commanded flotillas of destroyers and submarines, and from 1933 to 1936 he was naval attaché in Nazi Germany. He was promoted to rear admiral in 1938.

When Italy entered World War II on 10 June 1940, Courten first commanded from August 1941 to March 1942 the 7th Division, in which he participated in the First Battle of Sirte. He then commanded the 8th Division and participated in the successful opposition to Operation Vigorous. He was decorated with a Silver Medal of Military Valor.

When Prime Minister Benito Mussolini was deposed in July 1943, Courten was chosen to become Minister of the Navy, while subsequently replacing Arturo Riccardi as Chief of Staff of the Regia Marina ("Royal Navy"). When the Armistice of Cassibile — under which Italy made peace with the Allies and switched sides in the war — was announced on 8 September 1943, he convinced the fleet commander. Carlo Bergamini, to comply with the clauses of the armistice and not to scuttle his ships out of a fear that they would be given up to the Allies. Afterwards, he joined King Vittorio Emanuele III and Prime Minister Pietro Badoglio in their flight to Brindisi.

On 23 September 1943 Courten and Admiral Andrew Cunningham met at Taranto and reached the so-called Gentlemen's Agreement, which defined the collaboration of the Regia Marina with the Allies. He remained Minister of the Navy until July 1946 and Chief of Staff until December 1946, when he resigned to protest the clauses of the Paris Peace Treaties.

From 1952 to 1959 Courten was president of the Lloyd Triestino. He died at Frascati on 23 August 1978.
