= Italian Naval Academy =

Italian military school

Naval Academy
- Accademia Navale
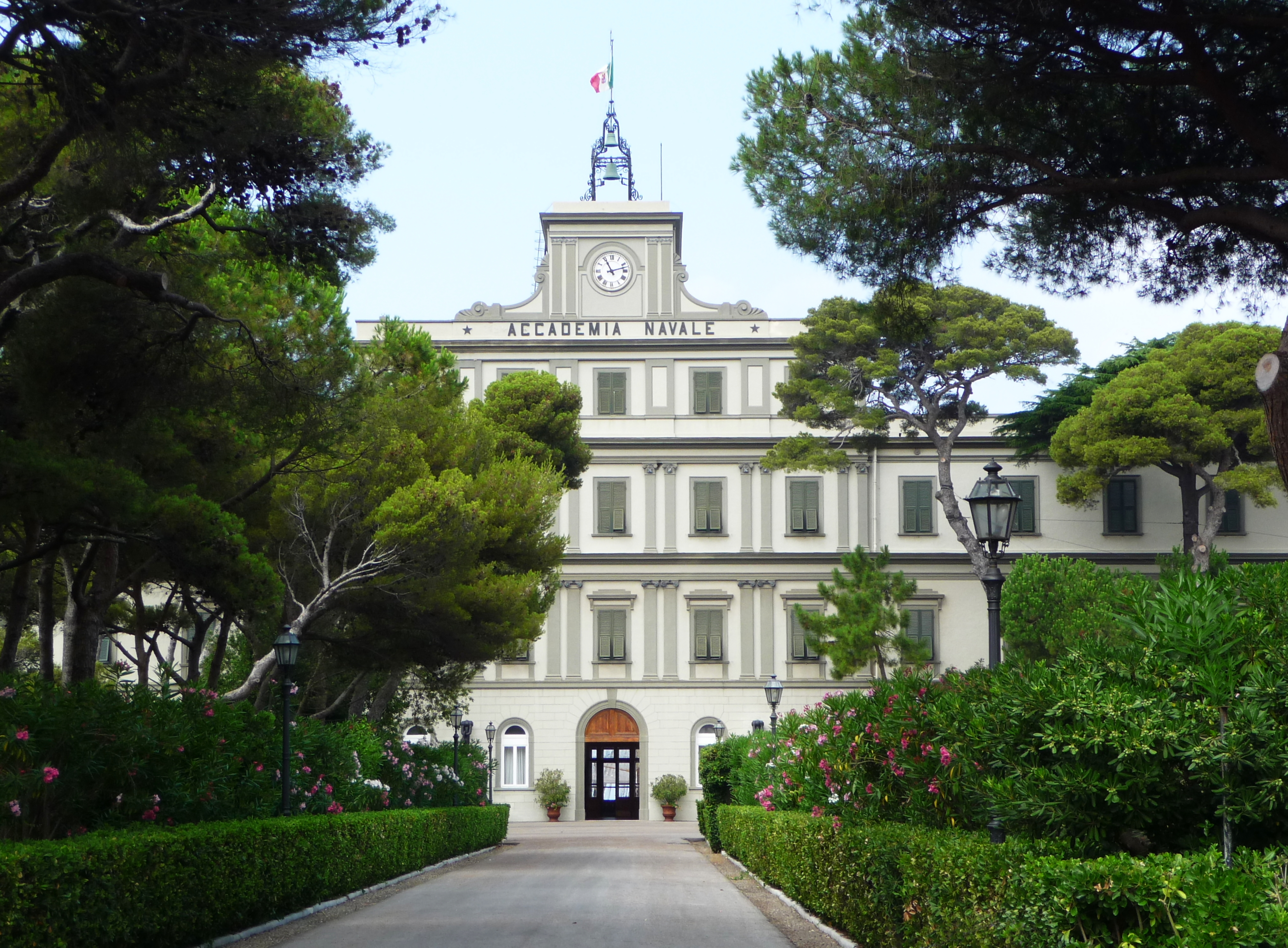
- Type: Naval Academy
- Established: November 6, 1881
- Officer in charge: Rear admiral Flavio Biaggi
- Location: Livorno, Tuscany, Italy; 43.527°N 10.308°E
- Website: Academy website

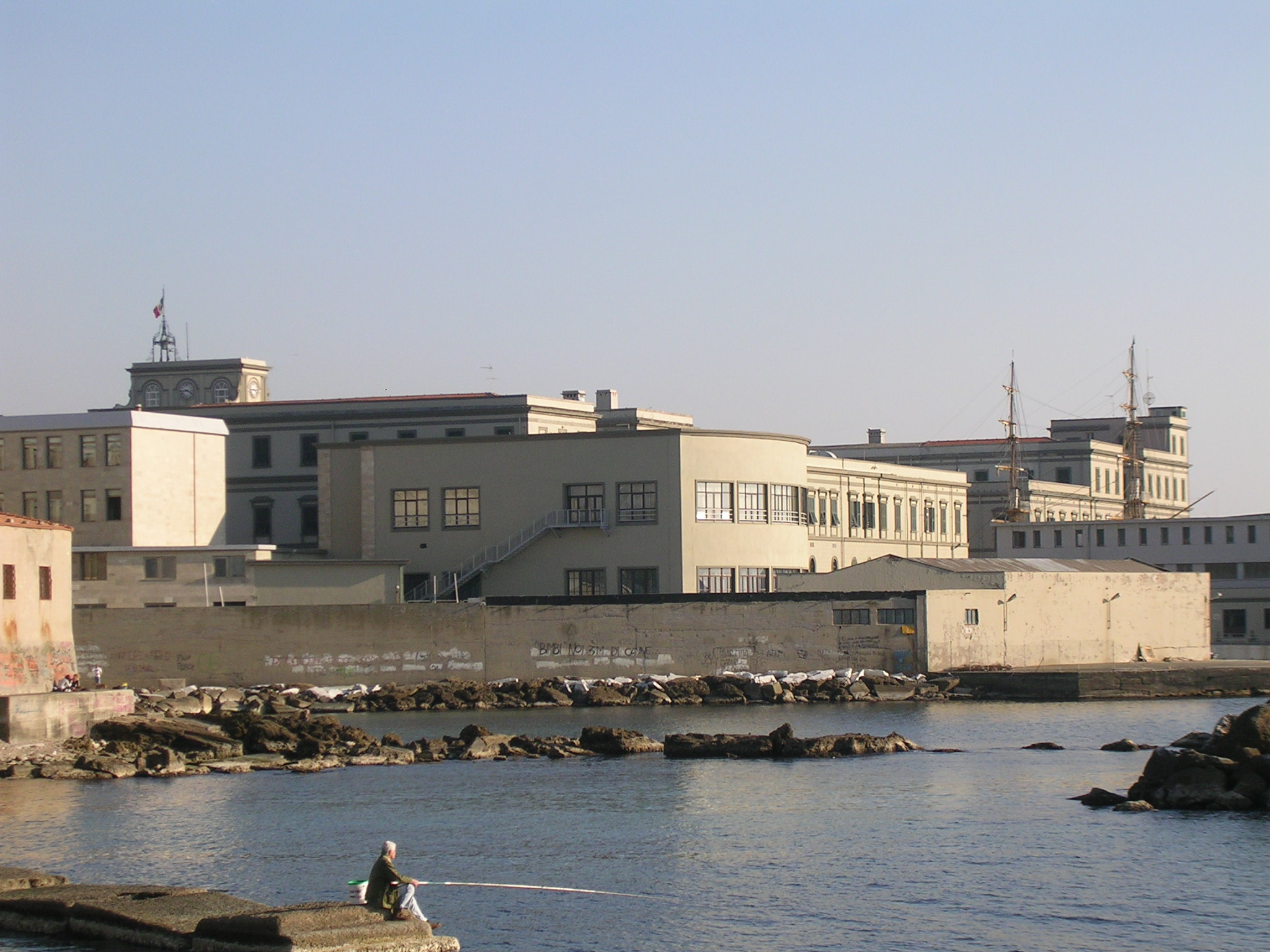
A view from the waterfront of L'Accademia Navale

The Italian Naval Academy (Italian: Accademia Navale) is a coeducational military university in Livorno, which is responsible for the technical training of military officers of the Italian Navy.

== History ==
=== The Hospitals ===
==== The Hospital of St. James ====
The Naval Academy stands on the former site of the Hospital of St. James, built in the 1640s for the quarantine of ships' crews from the Levant, which were previously diverted to the islands of Giglio and Elba.

==== The Hospital of St. Leopold ====
The Hospital of St. Leopold was designed by Ignatius Fazzi and built a little further south in 1773, by order of Leopold II. It was equipped with several towers, one of which served to guard the coast, two chapels and two cemeteries. It remained an active hospital until 1846. Before it was incorporated in the Academy in 1913, it was first transformed into a prison and then a military barracks.

The new hospital was considered one of the best in Europe. In the entrance, above a Baroque arch, a marble plaque still commemorates the usefulness of a public health and navigation, "Petrus Leopuldus Arch Austr. Hung. Boem. RP Magnus Etruria. Dux navigationis et hominibus salutis publicae Vindex mercibusque graviora pestilentiae suspicion notatis tutius expurgandis remotiorem hanc er Insulam porticus designavit construxit ann. MDCCLXXIII.

The hospital was laid out in a trapezoidal plan and surrounded by a dry moat and high wall. The corner towers served as defense.

Inside, the health complex was divided into two distinct zones. One consisted of the palace housing the officers, which still exists today, with a semicircular facade facing the entrance to the dock. At the center of the dock entrance, isolated in the water, sat the tower of San Rocco (destroyed during World War II), which was connected by a wooden walkway. There were also large sheds for the storage of goods in quarantine, a circular chapel, and a menagerie for animals. In this area, near the sheds, was a marble statue of Grand Duke Pietro Leopoldo, dressed as Roman centurion and placed in a rich marble niche, which was transferred, to where it stands today in the square of the churchyard of St. James. Further south, the other section, "La Gabbia", was isolated by a ditch from the rest of the complex. Here, the patients infected with plague and goods were separated out.

The Hospital also included two cemeteries.

=== L'Accademia Navale ===
The Accademia Navale was inaugurated on November 6, 1881 and initially used the area of the hospital of St. James. The Accademia was started by the then Secretary of the Navy, Admiral Benedetto Brin, as the union of the "Regia scuola di marina" in the Kingdom of Sardinia (located in Genoa) and the "Borbonica" (in Naples) following the Unification of Italy and the establishment of the Regia Marina.

One of the first cadets to attend the academy was Manlio Garibaldi, the last son of Giuseppe Garibaldi.

The design of the complex of buildings was entrusted to the captain of the military engineers, Luigi Pestalozza. The work was started in 1878, with the livornian engineer Angiolo Badaloni actively guiding the project. In 1913, the adjacent area occupied by the existing hospital at St. Leopold was attached to the Accademia Navale complex.

From 1923 to 1926, the Accademia Navale buildings housed aircraft, following the establishment of a new armed force, the Regia Aeronautica. This lasted until the Regia Aeronautica started its own academy in Caserta.

During World War II, because of the bombings that struck Livorno in July 1943, the Accademia Navale was forced to move to Venice and then, after only two months, to Brindisi, where it remained until 1946. Since the bombing had heavily damaged many of the buildings of the city and the structures that housed the academy, it was necessary at the end of the conflict to start substantial reconstruction efforts and infrastructure improvements, which took over twenty years and included, in 1966, the addition of "Palazzo Studi", which now houses the science labs and other specialized classrooms.

The main body of the academy, which is accessed along a tree-lined street from the entrance gate of the hospital of St. James, consists of a large three-story building of three wings at right angles which enclose a large "Piazza d'Armi". The side of the courtyard facing the Ligurian Sea is not occupied by buildings, and has a basement brig whose superstructure is used by students to practice maneuvering sails in anticipation of using the tall ship Amerigo Vespucci.

The Accademia Navale complex covers approximately 2,300,000 square metres (25,000,000 sq ft) and includes, classrooms, laboratories, dormitories, a swimming pool, a gym, libraries, cinemas, and auditoriums. The Academy annually hosts about 1,250 people, cadets and officers who attend courses.

== The courses of the Accademia Navale ==
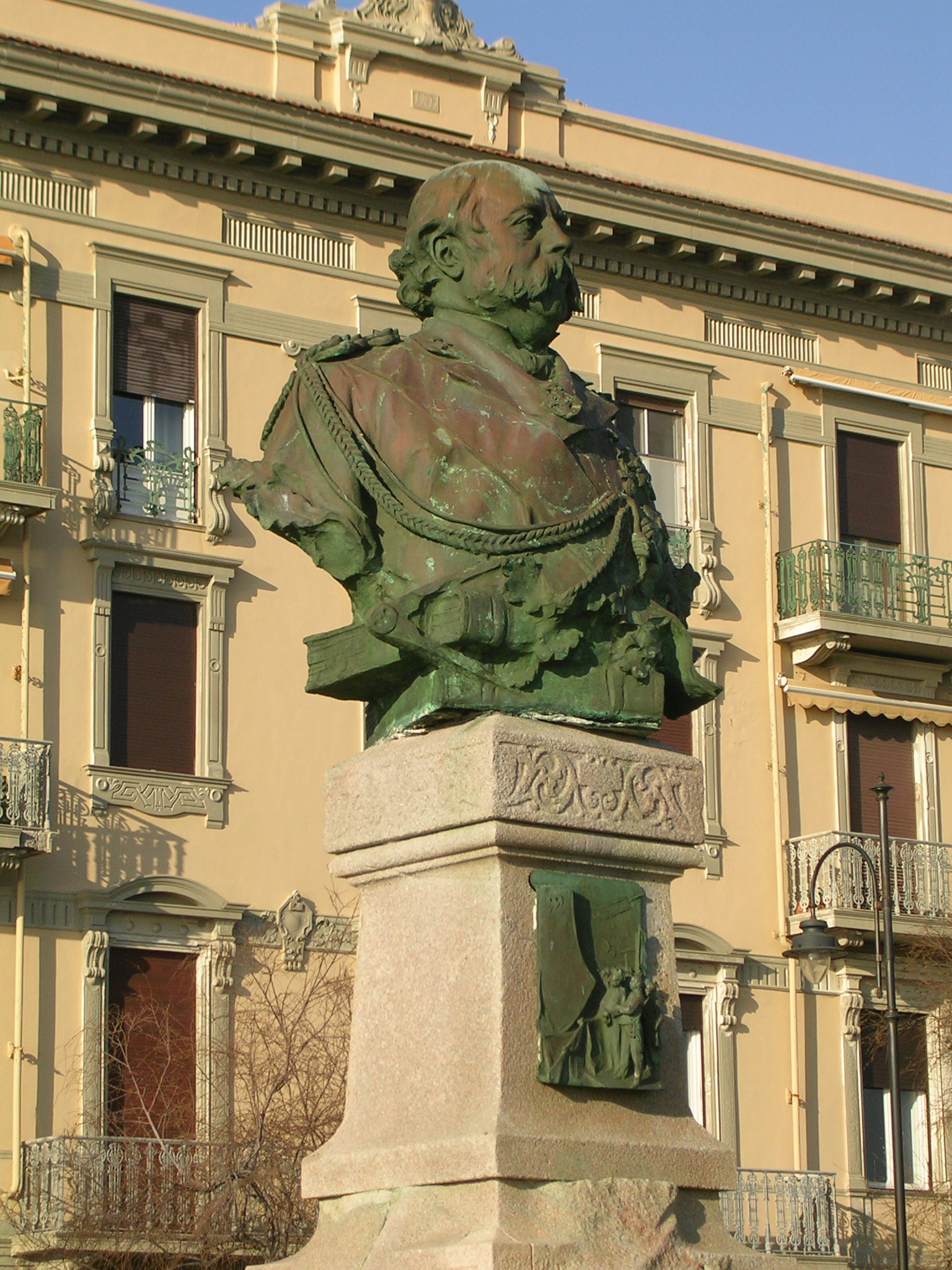
Monument to Benedetto Brin placed in front of the Accademia Navale

The Accademia Navale has different types of military courses:

- Normal courses: for the preparation of the official "servizio permanente effettivo" (SPE) of the Italian Navy, which lasts five or six years;
- Courses directed to vocational education and preparation of those who chose to do their military service as reserve officers;
- Specialization courses: which include a deeper view of vocational education and naval officers of the Navy and other armed forces and armed corps of the state, lasting several weeks;
- Courses for "ufficiali a nomina diretta" for supplementary education and professional military officers directly recruited through open competitions;
- Special Courses: for staff recruited through internal competitions.

The graduates from the L'Accademia Navale, as well as having the same recognition and opportunities as university graduates at normal universities, may have specific career opportunities, including:

- use on board naval units with responsibility for field combat systems
- jobs at technical institutions and establishments
- jobs at training institutions
- jobs at institutions of military operations

== See also ==
- Livorno
- Italian Navy
- Military Academy of Modena
