= Joint Special Forces Operations Headquarters (Italy) =

- Comando interforze per le Operazioni delle Forze Speciali
- Active: 1 December 2004
- Country: Italy
- Role: Special operations
- Part of: Joint Operations Command
- Garrison/HQ: Centocelle Airport, Rome, Italy
- Motto(s): Etiamsi omnes, ego non

Commanders
- Current commander: Amm. Squ. Paolo Pezzutti
- Notable commanders: Marco Bertolini, Donato Marzano, Giuseppe Cavo Dragone

The Joint Special Forces Operations Headquarters (Italian: Comando interforze per le operazioni delle forze speciali, COFS) is the joint command of the Italian Armed Forces charged with overseeing the various special operations units of the Italian Armed Forces. The command is part of the Joint Operations Command and is validated as NATO Component Command. COFS is headquartered at Centocelle Airport in Rome, Italy.

== Mission ==
At the national level, COFS is the Command specifically designated in charge of planning, organizing and conducting Special Operations, which include special reconnaissance, direct actions and military assistance.

The COFS commander is also an advisor to the Chief of Defence in all aspects concerning Special Operations. He also assists the political-military leaders in operational decisions and deals with the procurement of materials to be adopted by the special operations forces, on the basis of specific needs expressed by the units themselves.

== History ==
The Joint Forces Command for Operations of the Special Forces was established on 1 December 2004 under the direct control of the Chief of the Defence Staff.

COFS, initially, had the objective of coordinating the missions of the two defence special forces departments: the 9th Paratroopers Assault Regiment "Col Moschin", and GOI of the COMSUBIN. In 2005 the GIS and the 17th Raiders Wing were made available to COFS for possible use.

In 2006 the new command launched Operation "Sarissa", which involved the deployment and use of Task Force 45 in Afghanistan.

In 2008, after a validation process, the Command was certified by NATO as a Component Command for Special Operations within the framework of the NATO Response Force.

In 2021, COFS was moved under the renewed Joint Operations Command.

=== List of commanders ===
As of 2022, COFS has had seven commanders.

No.	Commander		Term			Service branch
No.	Portrait	Name	Took office	Left office	Term length	Service branch
1	Marco Bertolini	Gen. Div. Marco Bertolini (born 1953)	1 December 2004	25 September 2008	3 years, 299 days	Italian Army
2	Donato Marzano	Amm. Div. Donato Marzano (born 1956)	26 September 2008	9 October 2011	3 years, 13 days	Italian Navy
3	Maurizio Fioravanti	Gen. Div. Maurizio Fioravanti (born 1956)	10 October 2011	2 November 2014	3 years, 23 days	Italian Army
4	Giuseppe Cavo Dragone	Amm. Squ. Giuseppe Cavo Dragone (born 1957)	3 November 2014	26 June 2016	1 year, 236 days	Italian Navy
5	Nicola Zanelli	Gen. Div. Nicola Zanelli (born 1963)	27 June 2016	23 October 2019	3 years, 118 days	Italian Army
6	Nicola Lanza de Cristoforis	Gen. S.A. Nicola Lanza de Cristoforis (born 1963)	24 October 2019	19 January 2022	2 years, 87 days	Italian Air Force
7	Paolo Pezzutti	Amm. Squ. Paolo Pezzutti (born 1963)	20 January 2022	Incumbent	3 years, 66 days	Italian Navy

== Organization ==
The Joint Operational Command of the Special Forces is an Operational Command that has a hierarchical structure consisting of the Commander (COMCOFS), the Deputy Commander (DCOMCOFS) and the Chief of Staff (COS). COFS represents the staff body available to the Joint Forces Operations Command on the subject of special operations and reports directly to the latter's Commander.

== Subordinate units ==
The command is responsible for the operations conducted by special forces units:

- 9th Paratroopers Assault Regiment "Col Moschin" of the Italian Army;
- 4th Alpini Paratroopers Regiment "Monte Cervino" of the Italian Army;
- 185th Paratroopers Reconnaissance Target Acquisition Regiment "Folgore" of the Italian Army;
- COMSUBIN of the Italian Navy;
- 17th Raiders Wing of the Italian Air Force;
- GIS of the Carabinieri (for military needs).

== See also ==
- Italian special forces
- Army Special Forces Command (Italy)
