= Luciano Portolano =

Italian general and Chief of the Defense Staff (born 1960)

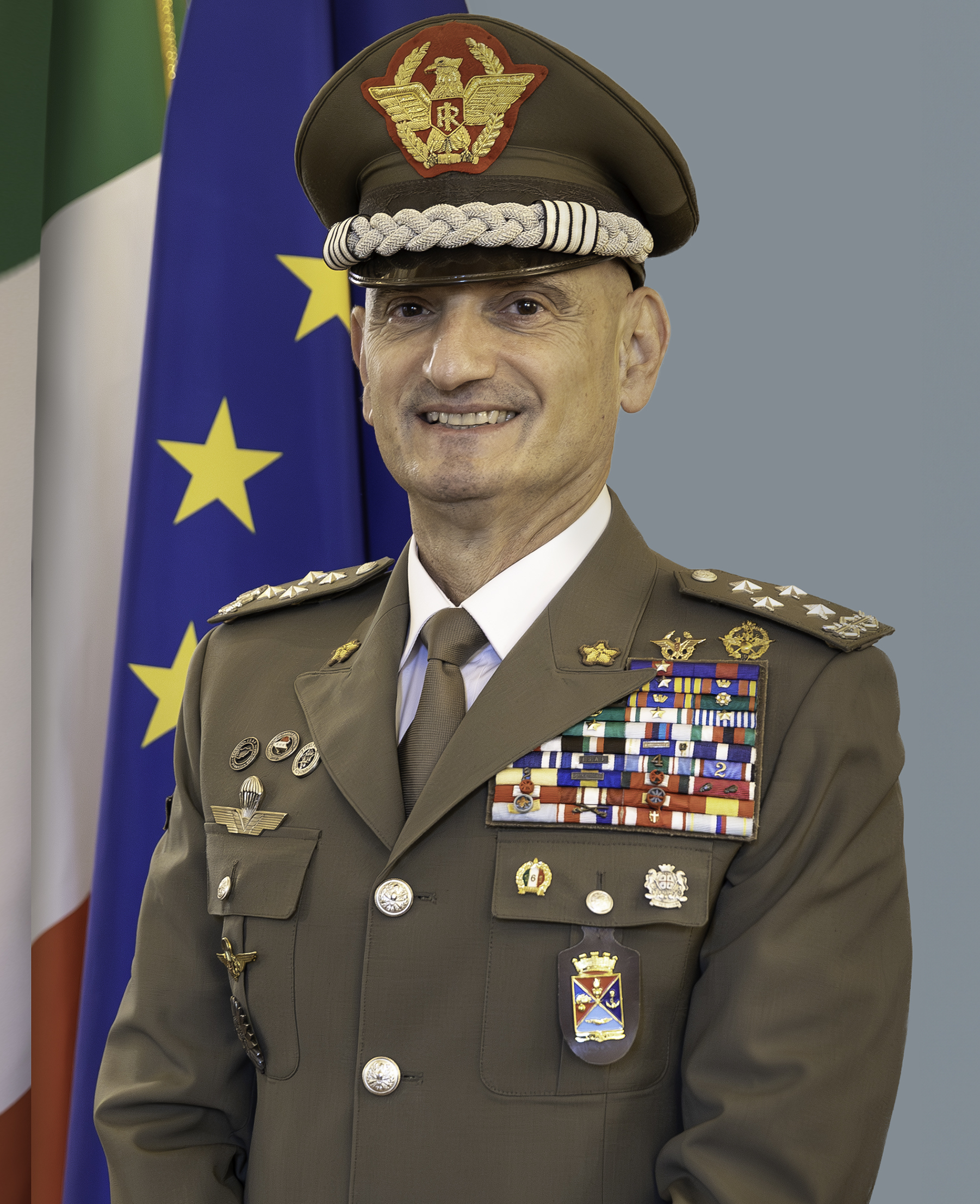
- Born: Luciano Antonio Portolano; September 18, 1960 (age 66); Agrigento, Sicily
- Alma mater: Military Academy of Modena; University of Turin
- Military career
- Allegiance: Italy
- Branch: Esercito Italiano
- Service years: 1981–present
- Rank: General
- Unit: Bersaglieri
- Commands: 67th Bersaglieri Battalion "Fagarè"; 18th Bersaglieri Regiment; Mechanized Brigade "Sassari"; TAAC-West; UNIFIL; JFC Naples (Chief of Staff); Joint Operations Command; Secretary General of Defence and National Armaments Director; Chief of the Defense Staff
- Conflicts: UNIKOM; Yugoslav Wars; Kosovo War (Operation Joint Guarantor, Operation Joint Guardian, Operation Althea); Iraq War; Operation Ancient Babylon; UNAMI; War in Afghanistan; Civil war in Somalia; Civil war in Lebanon (UNIFIL)
- Awards: Officer, OMRI; Officer, Military Order of Italy; Silver Valour Medal (Army); Gold Merit Cross (Army) (2); Officer, Legion of Merit

Luciano Antonio Portolano (born September 18, 1960) is an Italian Army general who currently serves as the Chief of the Defense Staff since 4 October 2024. Prior to his assumption to the post, General Portolano served as Secretary General of Defence and National Armaments Director, commander of the Joint Operations Command, Chief of Staff of the Allied Joint Force Command Naples, and as commander of the United Nations Interim Force in Lebanon.

== Early life and education ==
Portolano was born on 18 September 1960 at Agrigento, and entered high school at the Liceo Classico e Musicale Empedocle, and also served as part of the local athletic team "Libertas". Portolano then entered the Military Academy of Modena in 1978 and graduated as part of Course 161 and also completed the Application School of the Army at Turin in 1981. Portolano also completed various courses locally and abroad, such as the Army Staff Course, the Advanced Staff Course, the Joint Staff Course at the Application School of the Army, and also completed the Command and General Staff Officers Course at the United States Army Command and General Staff College in Fort Leavenworth, Kansas.

Portolano also earned a degree University of Turin, where he finished his degree in Strategic Sciences, and holds a Master's Degree in Integrated Management and Development of Human Resources and a Master's Degree in Strategic Sciences.

== Military career ==
General Portolano joined the Italian army in September 1981 and was assigned to various units within the Italian Army, primarily Bersaglieri formations, and outside of Italy he commanded United Nations forces in various countries. During his junior years as a lieutenant, Portolano was a Platoon and Company Commander in the 27th Bersaglieri Battalion "Jamiano". On 1990-1991, Portolano was deployed to the Iran-Iraq border and was part of the United Nations Iran–Iraq Military Observer Group (UNIMOG) aimed to maintain the buffer zone within the Iran-Iraq border following a ceasefire deal between the two states. Following the aftermath of the Gulf War, Portolano was part of the Italian Forces assigned to the United Nations Iraq–Kuwait Observation Mission (UNIKOM) in 1991.

In 1997, Portolano was named as the commander of the 67th Bersaglieri Battalion "Fagarè" of the 18th Bersaglieri Regiment and was promoted to the rank of lieutenant colonel. During his stint as commander of the 67th Bersaglieri Battalion "Fagarè", Portolano was involved in NATO operations in Operation Joint Guarantor in North Macedonia and Operation Joint Guardian in Kosovo and assisted the Early Entry Forces of the Italian Contingent during the Kosovo War.

In 2003, Portolano was promoted to the rank of colonel. During the Iraq War, then-colonel Portolano deployed to Iraq with the 18th Bersaglieri Regiment and in 2003 he was named commander of the JTF Manoeuvre Task Force of Italy's Operation Ancient Babylon in Iraq. Later Portolano was part of the United Nations Assistance Mission for Iraq. Portolano would later serve as Staff Officer, Doctrine Section, Military Regulations and Policy Branch and as a member of the Staff Office, Training and Education Section, Training Branch, before serving as Head Regulations Section, Doctrine, Training and Regulations Branch, Head Operations Section, Force Deployment/COE Division and as Head Operations Division, Joint Operations Headquarters. On 2007 to 2010, Portolano served at the Italian Embassy in London, United Kingdom as a Military Attaché and was also accredited in diplomatic missions in Ireland. On 2011-2012, Portolano was named as Commander of the Mechanized Brigade "Sassari" and was later deployed in Herat, Afghanistan as part of the International Security Assistance Force, where he was named as commander of the Multinational RC-W (Regional Command - West) and was later involved in the United Nations Assistance Mission in Afghanistan.

On 16 June 2014, Portolano was named Commander of the United Nations Interim Force in Lebanon (UNIFIL) by United Nations Secretary-General Ban Ki-moon with a rank of Major General. During his stint as commander of the UNIFIL, he commanded a total of 10,000 troops from 40 different countries and continued the initiatives in monitoring the situation within the Lebanese border and continued the cooperation between UN Forces and the Lebanese Armed Forces. Portolano ended his service in Lebanon in July 2016. On September 2016, Portolano was named as the Chief of Staff, while subsequently serving as the Head of the European Union Command Element at the Allied Joint Force Command Naples, and was later promoted to the rank of lieutenant general. Portolano would later be appointed as commander of the Joint Operations Command on 2 September 2019, and initiated reforms and preparation upgrades for joint operations in the armed forces across a multitude of theaters within the modern battlefield. On 31 January 2020, Portolano also initiated operations and directions on the implementation of lockdowns and the declaration of state of emergency due to the effects of the COVID-19 pandemic in the country.

On 26 July 2021, then-Lieutenant General Portolano also upgraded and reorganized the name of the command from Joint Operations Command (Comando Operativo Interforze, COI) to Joint Summit Operations Command (Comando Operativo di Vertice Interforze, COVI) and elevated the command's position within the hierarchy of the armed forces due to its operational importance and its wide range of responsibilities. The development also led to the creation of the Commandant of the Command for Joint Operations, where Portolano served as its first commandant, and was later promoted to the rank of General.

On 13 August 2021 to 31 August 2021, amidst the Airlift evacuation in Afghanistan, Portolano led coordination efforts with the Italian Air Force on the evacuation of Italian troops, diplomatic personnel, and civilians, and led to the deployment of 5 Lockheed Martin C-130J Super Hercules transport aircraft and 4 Boeing KC-767A tanker/transport planes, as well as the various ground units to secure the evacuation. The operation led to the evacuation of 5,011 people from Afghanistan to Italy and was placed under the Ministry of the Interior. On 29 September 2021, General Portolano was appointed as the Secretary General of Defence and National Armaments Director, where he initiated reforms on armaments policy and defense production.

On 17 September 2024, Portolano was appointed by the Council of Ministers as the new Chief of the Defense Staff, and replaced Admiral Giuseppe Cavo Dragone, who was named as the new Chair of the NATO Military Committee. Portolano assumed the position as the Chief of Defense Staff on 4 October 2024. After his assumption to the post, Portolano emphasized the importance of preparedness and urgency in upgrading the Italian Armed Forces against new threats in modern warfare, and on learning the lessons on the Russian invasion of Ukraine. Portolano also called on the importance of enhancing partnerships with allies and partners across the region and enhance collaboration with foreign armed forces against potential Russian aggression.

== Awards and decorations ==
- (Kingdom of the Two Sicilies) Two Sicilian Royal Family: Knight Grand Cross of Merit of the Order of Saint George
- Officer, Military Order of Italy (awarded on 4 November 2012)
- Knight, Military Order of Italy
- Medal of Valor of the Army (awarded on 5 June 2001)
- 2 Gold Cross Medals, Army Cross of Merit (1 awarded on 17 July 2006)
- Knight Grand Cross, Order of Merit of the Italian Republic (awarded on 5 October 2021)
- Commander, Order of Merit of the Italian Republic (awarded on 2 June 2019)
- Officer, Order of Merit of the Italian Republic (awarded on 2 June 2012)
- Knight, Order of Merit of the Italian Republic (awarded on 27 December 2005)
- Maurician medal
- Gold Medal of Merit, the Italian Red Cross Medal of Merit
- Military Medal of Merit for Long Command with gold star (20 years)
- Joint Chiefs of Staff Medal of Honor
- Commemorative Cross for Peace Operations (more than 3 missions: Iran, Iraq, Kuwait, Albania, North Macedonia, Kosovo, and Lebanon)
- Military Commemorative Medal of Afghanistan

=== Foreign awards and medals ===
- Officer Cross with Swords, Order pro Merito Melitensi (Malta)
- 2 NATO Meritorious Service Medals (awarded in 2012 & 2020)
- NATO Medal for Kosovo
- NATO Medal for Macedonia
- UNIFIL Medal (with award numeral 4)
- UNIMOG Medal
- UNIKOM Medal (with award numeral 2)
- EU Common Security and Defence Policy Service Medal (Operation Althea)
- Commander, National Order of the Cedar (Lebanon)
- 2 Officer Medals, US Legion of Merit (2014 & 2019)
- Officier, French Legion of Honour
- Medal of Merit for the Defence of the Republic of Lithuania
- Grand Officer, Order of Naval Merit (Brazil)
- Spanish Cross of Naval Merit with White Decoration
- Silver Order for Merit for International Cooperation (Slovenia)

=== Badges ===
- Military Paratrooper Badge
- United States Army Command and General Staff College International Graduate Badge

== Other awards ==
- ICARO Merit Plaque
- Telamone for Peace Award

== Personal life ==
He is married and has two children.
