= Gruppo di intervento speciale =

Elite unit of the Italian Gendarmerie

Special Intervention Group
- Gruppo di Intervento Speciale
- Gruppo di Intervento Speciale official insignia
- Active: 6 February 1978 – present
- Country: Italy
- Branch: Carabinieri
- Type: Police tactical unit
- Size: At least 100
- Part of: 2nd Carabinieri Mobile Brigade (logistics and administration); Comando interforze per le Operazioni delle Forze Speciali
- Garrison/HQ: Livorno
- Nickname: Teste di cuoio ("Leatherheads")
- Mottos: Nei secoli fedele ("Faithful through the centuries"); Silenziosi come la notte veloci come la folgore ("As silent as the night, as fast as the lightning")
- Colors: Black and Red
- Engagements: Counter criminals operations in Italy; Years of Lead (Italy); Operation Alba; Kosovo War; Operation Ancient Babylon; War in Afghanistan

Commanders
- Current commander: Colonel Gianluca Feroce

The Gruppo di Intervento Speciale (GIS) ("Special Intervention Group") is the special forces unit of the Carabinieri. The Carabinieri, a branch of the Italian Armed Forces responsible for both military and civil policing, formed GIS in 1978 as a police tactical unit. In 2004, GIS assumed a special operations role, evolving to a special forces unit, in addition to the police tactical unit role, becoming part of the Comando interforze per le Operazioni delle Forze Speciali (Joint Special Forces Operational Headquarters).

The unit has taken part in counter-terrorism operations and VIP, executive and dignitary protection security. Since its inception, GIS has distinguished itself throughout Italy for efficiency and excellent preparation, and has also operated and operates in several theatres of war including the Balkans, Afghanistan, Iraq, and the Horn of Africa, as well as in all the countries where Italian diplomatic offices are at risk.

In Italy, GIS is one of three police tactical units that can operate throughout the country, the other two being Nucleo Operativo Centrale di Sicurezza (NOCS) of the Polizia di Stato and Antiterrorismo Pronto Impiego (ATPI) of the Guardia di Finanza.

== Roles ==
The Special Intervention Group is employed in high-risk special actions against terrorism. The GIS specializes in hostage rescue, prioritizing their physical safety, in the reconquest of vital targets and facilities held by terrorists, in resolutive intervention against hijacking, and in intervention in environments featuring NBCR dangers.

=== Domestic roles ===
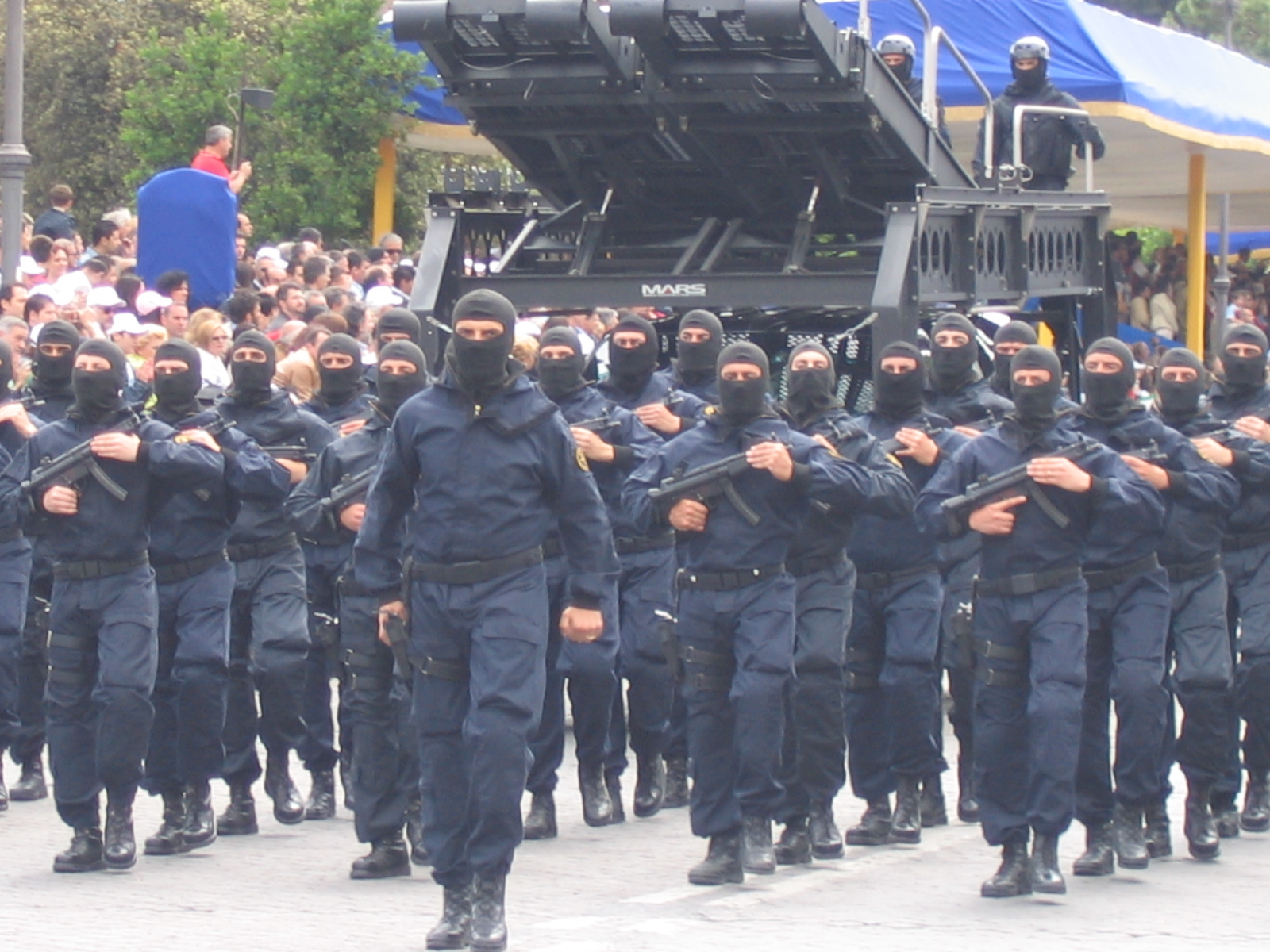
GIS operators marching in public in the Rome Parade in 2006.

The Special Intervention Group ensures the permanent availability of personnel to the Ministry of the Interior for immediate deployments. The Ministry of the Interior employs the GIS for the release of hostages from airplanes, ships, trains, buses and buildings. It also calls them to protect sensitive targets from terrorist or criminal attacks and to ensure surveillance and security at high-risk events (in coordination with Public Security authorities).

Aside from the permanent availability ensured to the Interior Ministry, the GIS is used by the General Command of the Carabinieri to guarantee the security of threatened personalities or to assist territorial units in crisis situations such as kidnapping and capturing criminals, fugitives or dangerous evades. The GIS also trains and certifies other Carabinieri assigned to escort duties, and provides security services to important persons.

=== Roles abroad ===
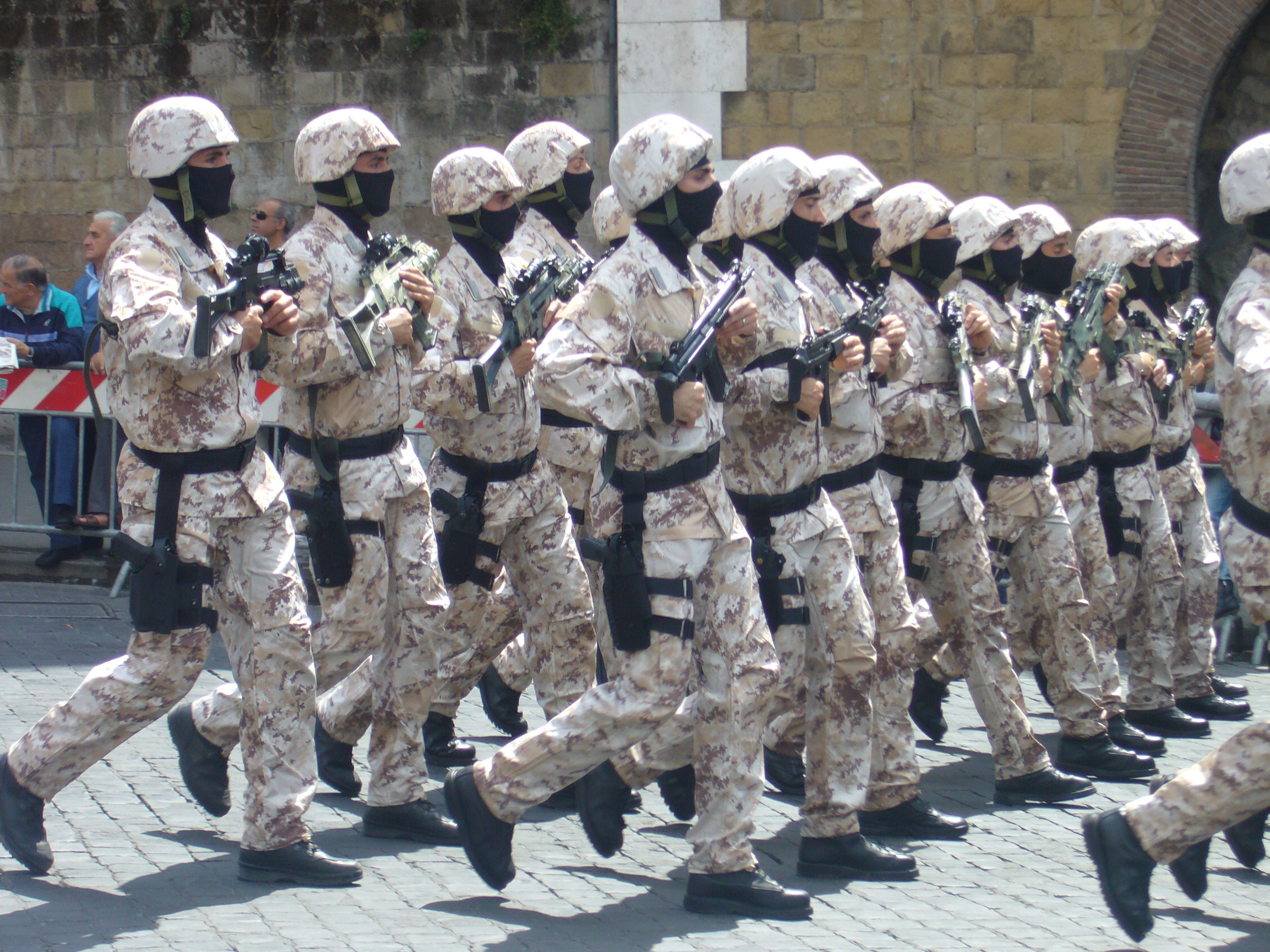
GIS in desert camo for overseas operations

The GIS is also deployed abroad, to perform foreign hostage-rescue operations, to protect Italian embassies and consulates in highly dangerous situations, as well as for special intervention in Carabinieri deployments and operations abroad.

Occasionally they are also in charge of training foreign police personnel.

=== Special operations ===
In 2004, GIS became a special forces unit responsible for special operations, including direct action, special reconnaissance, military assistance and counter-terrorism, part of Comando interforze per le Operazioni delle Forze Speciali of the Armed Forces, in addition to its civilian police tactical unit role. GIS can deploy overseas for special operations if requested by COFS. In 2015, laws were changed to permit the Italian foreign intelligence service Agenzia Informazioni e Sicurezza Esterna to use GIS for individual missions.

== History ==
=== Background ===
During the 1970s (the so-called years of lead) the Italian political and civil institutions suffered a violent assault by endemic terrorist groups. Although the Government had not taken any official initiatives, units were set up in the elite units of the Armed Forces and Police for the development and experimentation of intervention techniques in crisis situations in the presence of hostages.

On 18 October 1977, the political will changed as a result of the success of Operation Feuerzauber (Magic Fire) conducted by the Germans of the GSG-9 that in Somalia succeeded in freeing 86 passengers and 3 crew members of the Lufthansa 181 flight hijacked and still in the hand of terrorists. Feasibility studies were immediately carried out.

Following this action, interior minister Francesco Cossiga on 6 January 1978 ordered the creation of the UN.I.S. (Unità di Intervento Speciale, Italian for "Special Intervention Units"), in order to support anti-terrorism investigations.

In a feasibility study conducted on 24 October 1977, the Carabinieri foresaw the establishment of the Special Intervention Group within the Battalion "Tuscania", in order to enable the Group to act both framed the larger Battalion and alone.

=== Establishment ===
The Special Intervention Group was the first to be officially established on 6 February 1978 by the General Command of the Carabinieri, within the then-Battalion "Tuscania". This unit of the Carabinieri could act both in civil and public order and in the military sphere. The Special Intervention Group was made operationally autonomous, administratively part of the Battalion and logistically supported by the Folgore Brigade.

By December 1981, the Special Intervention Group reached its full operational capability.

The public debut of the GIS took place in Trani on 29 December 1980. In the prison, a revolt led by terrorists broke out. On the building, helicopters began to whirl, from which masked men quickly fell down. They regained control of the prison in a few minutes despite the many gates welded by the rebels to hinder an intervention from outside.

=== Expansion of the scope ===
In the following years, the GIS expanded its tasks: in December 1988 the Group, on the proposal of its own commander, was tasked with prevention and counter-sabotage activities, as well as with the support of the Carabinieri territorial organization, sensitive targets surveillance, and high-risk interventions and round-ups against organised crime.

In 1994, the tasks of the Group were further expanded, including support for the capture of prominent fugitives, in anti-drug operations and in operations aimed at executing orders of the judicial authorities in the presence of environmental characteristics that entail considerable difficulties in execution. An underwater component was also set established and the use of the unit in support of the Italian embassies at risk was also approved.

=== 2004: special forces unit ===
The GIS, because of the minor terrorist emergency, since 2000, has operated mainly in the military, and since 26 November 2004, it has been part of the Special Forces, along with COMSUBIN, 9th Paratroopers Assault Regiment and the 17º Stormo Incursori.

The decision of converting the GIS into a special forces unit was taken as a consequence of the large overseas deployment of its operators, which distinguished themselves for competence and resolution in various scenarios of war. Already after its creation, the group operated alongside Italian troops in Lebanon during the Lebanese Civil War, and since that moment they become an important part of the Italian military actions around the globe.

== Organization ==
The GIS headquarters is in Livorno.

The exact number of operating personnel is confidential information, but the Group is organized at a company level.

The GIS is divided into:

- A command section
- An administrative section
- A training and exercise section
- A section of exploration, reconnaissance, and target acquisition
- A combat section
- A section of selected shooters

The largest combat section, in turn, is divided into three detachments consisting of teams of four men: a commander, an explosive specialist, a climbing specialist and an equipment specialist.

At any moment there is a detachment ready to leave the base in 30 minutes. For this purpose, there are always some Agusta-Bell AB 412 supplied with the Carabinieri and a 46th Air Force Aircraft of the Air Force that is located in nearby Pisa, which can supply the C-130 Hercules when needed. The remaining can be used within three and twenty-four hours of the alarm. In the most urgent cases, an advanced core precedes the operating section in order to plan the intervention strategy based on first-hand information.

The exploration, reconnaissance and scouting section is in turn made up of teams of three men: two fighters armed with Mauser 86 SR and an explorer equipped with a semiautomatic HK PSG-1. During longer actions, men can become the explorer.

== Publicly known missions ==
As of late 2018, the Special Intervention Group has been involved in more than 600 special operations:

- 28 December 1980, prison of Trani: Blitz inside the prison where some communist brigades members were barricaded. At the end of a violent gunfight, 18 police members were liberated. Many were wounded among special forces, prisoners and terrorists, but no victims.
- 25 August 1987, Elba Island, Porto Azzurro Prison (Livorno): 6 men sentenced for life, among them the terrorist Nero Mario Tuti, take 11 prisoners, 17 prison guards, and 5 civilians as hostages. After a few hours, members of GIS and NOCS entered in the building, and injured all six terrorists.
- 24 June 1989, Oria (Brindisi): Roberto Di Giovanni, 26 years old, suffering from a mental disorder that worsened after his mother died, barricaded himself in a house with a pistol and a couple of hunting rifles and shot 200 rounds at civilians and later against the police, killing one person and injuring 10, among them 4 Carabinieri and a policeman. Any negotiation was useless because he shot at everything that moved. When the night came, GIS entered the house with the use of gas and after hand-to-hand combat arrested Roberto.
- December 1989, San Luca (Reggio Calabria): the capture of the 'ndrangheta member Strangio, during the investigation on the seizure of Cesare Casella
- 17 April 1990, Santa Margherita Ligure (Genova): Liberation of Patrizia Tacchella.
- 16 January 1995, Segrate (Milan): Liberation of Raffaele Alessi.
- 9 May 1997, Venice: Liberation of the San Marco bell tower from so-called "Venetian Most Serene Government" militants, that reached San Marco square with a home made armored vehicle and a camper.
- 18 December 1999, Alicudi Island (Messina): Antidrug operation at sea.
- 7 June 2000, Turin: liberation of Rosa Laura Spadafora.
- 10 June 2000, Torre Annunziata (Naples): capture of the absconding camorrista Ferdinando Cesarano.
- 2 November 2000, Crotone: GIS operators captured the vessel Tiride, which was carrying three tons of hashish, and arrested its crew.
- 9–10 December 2001, Platì: The capture of fugitive Giuseppe Barbaro, head of the eponymous clan from Platì.
- 25 March 2002, Kabul, Afghanistan: "Operation Corona" escort for the former Afghan King Mohammed Zahir Shah.
- 27 March 2002, Strongoli Marina, Calabria: GIS operators arrested fugitive Guirino Iona and two of his associates.
- 30 November 2002, Ostia (Rome):capture of the absconding Tunisian Faid Isa Kamalfa, barricaded in a Villa.
- August 2003, Nasiriyah: Iraq The GIS unit assigned to the Multinational Specialized Unit (MSU) Regiment has carried out numerous counter-terrorism operations, which have led to the capture of two war criminals, the detention of several terrorism suspects, and the seizure of large quantities of weapons, ammunition, and explosives.
- 13 November 2003, Nasiriyah: Iraq Support to the operation after the attack against the Italian army base that caused 28 death.
- 13–14 November 2003, Platì: "Operation Marine", GIS operators captured two repeat offenders, prominent members of the dominant mafia families of Platì.
- 17 November 2003, Rosarno: "Operation Wild Forest", GIS operators captured a dangerous member of the ’Ndrangheta.
- 6 April 2004, Nasiriyah: Iraq some members of the GIS take part to the battle of the bridges against Mahdi soldiers.
- 14 March 2005, Corato, (Bari): An arsenal, used probably by a gang specialized in assaulting bank trucks, was impounded by Carabinieri. The GIS made an incursion inside an abandoned country house where there were six people within them and absconding; all were natives of Calabria and specialized in gun-running, the drug trade and extortion. Militaries found ten Kalashnikov rifles, body armor, camouflage uniforms and lights. Near the building were parked some sports cars. During the operation, one of the criminals attempted to fire but was stopped by a member of the special forces.
- 28 June 2005, Bogogno, Novara: night blitz to capture Angelo Sacco, that the previous day killed three people and injured eight.
- February 2006, security during the Torino Winter Olympic Games.
- 27 April 2006, Nasiriyah: Iraq new attack against an Italian military base with five deaths. Security operation assured by GIS
- 5 June 2006, Nasiriyah: Iraq attack against Italian armoured vehicles. One death. GIS is called to investigate.
- 22 August 2008, antidrug operation in Poggiomarino (Napoli) against Camorra Narcos. Impounded 100 KGS of pure cocaine.
- 18 July 2009, fraction Bosco di Nanto, Vicenza: blitz to capture Battista Zanellato, 84 years old, who barricaded himself in his own house a few hours after killing a police officer.
- 1 October 2009, Naples: blitz to capture the Mafia boss, 34 years old, supposedly the Lord of the Camorra clan Gionta of Torre Annunziata. The fast raid of the Special Forces in the house of those absconding in front of Palazzo Fienga, a stronghold of the clan, allowed the securing of the zone before the start of a firefight.
- 6 November 2009, Città di Castello: blitz to capture a South African citizen, who a few hours before killed a Polish man. During the raid, one GIS member was slightly injured.
- 10 December 2009, Mestre: blitz to free a Chinese citizen that went missing a few days before. He was captured by a Chinese gang and imprisoned in a loft in Piave Street.
- 29 May 2010, Comacchio: blitz to capture Mario Cavalieri, barricaded in his home. The previous day he had punched a female officer. After a siege of 30 hours around his home in Spina Street in Comacchio, Mario Cavalieri surrendered to the GIS at 16:45.
- 23 October 2010, Agrigento: blitz to capture the Mafia boss Gerlandino Messina, wanted since 1999. At the moment of his arrest, he was in possession of weapons.
- 30 June 2011, Collegno: blitz in the loft of Santo Guglielmino (85 years old), who barricaded himself for 15 hours, with hostages: the cohabitant Rosa Colusso and an 86-year-old woman. During the blitz he killed Rosa and committed suicide.
- 3 November 2011, Herat, Afghanistan: in the Esko International headquarters after a Taliban commando broke out. According to well-informed sources, the hostages who fell into the hands of the terrorists in the occupied buildings were 18, including three Italians, while the troops who quickly surrounded the area belonged to the rapid reaction force, a couple of Italian infantry platoons and air riflemen (Aeronautica Militare), kept in constant pre-alarm to cope with sudden needs. Activated immediately was also the antiterrorist component of Task Force 45, which has its base and its command within Camp Arena. Less than 20 men of the Gruppo di intervento speciale and the operational group Navy raiders COMSUBIN planned and executed the blitz, which developed in the late morning. Seemingly, the use of helicopters was made in a simultaneous attack on buildings controlled by terrorists, penetrating through doors, windows and roofs. The precise fire of the raiders killed all the terrorists, as confirmed by Noor Khan Nekzad, spokesman for the Afghan police. The blitz was defined as impeccable by numerous military analysts.
- 7 December 2011, Vandoies di Sopra: blitz in the Villa of Erwin Heinrich Purer, to arrest "King of Evasions" Max Leitner.
- 3 May 2012, Romano di Lombardia, near Bergamo: An armed man barricaded himself in the main seat of the Italian Tax office and taking hostages. After 30 minutes the man freed all the hostages except one. At 17:30 GIS arrived to control the situation.
- 2 November 2013, Rovigo: with a night blitz of less than three minutes, GIS breached the home of Costa di Rovigo and captured three people, two men and a woman, that had been barricaded for 33 hours with the sworn threat of burning down the building. The action saw two GIS teams (15 operators).
- 9 February 2014, Inveruno, near Milan: a joint action between GIS, Lombardy Federal Police and ROS to capture Domenico Cutrì, boss of 'Ndrangheta' gang. After being sentenced to life for murder—just five days before—he escaped from Gallarate, during transport, with the help of other members of the gang. The action was the fastest in Italian history—just eight seconds were needed to arrest the criminal.
- 7–9 January 2015, Paris: collaboration with the French police and protection of the most important sites after a terrorist attack in France.
- 8 December 2015 – 20 November 2016 Rome: According to Interior Minister Angelino Alfano GIS and Nucleo Operativo Centrale di Sicurezza operators were kept in alert during the Extraordinary Jubilee of Mercy.
- 26–27 May 2017, Taormina (Sicily): GIS in service to assure the security of World Leaders during the G7 Italian Presidency.
- 24 December 2017, Naples: arrest of the criminal so-called "O Fantasma", wanted for attempted murder.
- 3 May 2018, Qualiano: After a siege of 10 hours, GIS operators breached the inside the home of Pasquale De Falco that the same day killed his mother. The man was arrested unharmed.
- 27 November 2018, Mugnano di Napoli: the Carabinieri of the GIS contributed to the arrest of Antonio Orlando, considered to be the regent of the "Orlando-Nuvoletta-Polverino" clan. Orlando, inserted in the list of most wanted criminals in Italy, was a fugitive for 15 years.
- 7 May 2019: Afragola: GIS operators contributed to arrest of abscond Giuseppe Monfregolo, 40 years old, considered as an important member of the "Amato-Pagano" clan, based around Arzano area.
- January 2021-30 June 2022, Mali: GIS operators, part of the Takuba Task Force, have participated in anti-jihadist operations in the Sahel.
- 24 February 2022-ongoing, Kyiv: GIS operators were deployed in order to defend the Italian embassy in the Ukrainian capital.
- 16 January 2023, Palermo: GIS operators involved in the capture of the Sicilian mafia boss Matteo Messina Denaro.
- 20 January 2023, Palermo: GIS operators employed to investigate one of the hideouts used by boss Matteo Messina Denaro during his period on the run.
- 24 June 2024, Siracusa: GIS operators stormed into a house in the center of Syracuse, leading to the immediate release of a hostage and the arrest of a local minor, close to reaching adulthood, who, under threat and with the aid of a weapon, had unlawfully detained the 19-year-old from Modica against his will.
- 18 August 2024, San Candido: The Carabinieri of the GIS (Gruppo di Intervento Speciale) intervened to apprehend Ewald Kühbacher. After killing two people, Kühbacher had barricaded himself inside an apartment. During the operation, he shot himself with a firearm, resulting in his death.
- 19 May 2025, San Vincenzo, Livorno: GIS operators, together with 1st Carabinieri Airborne Regiment Tuscania, took part in the capture of 11 individuals who, on 28 March 2025, had assaulted an armored cash-in-transit vehicle and stolen approximately €3 million before fleeing in two Volvo SUVs, both previously stolen between September 2024 and March 2025 and fitted with stolen license plates, as well as in a third vehicle taken during the robbery. The suspects were also found in possession of the weapons belonging to three private security guards.

== War operations ==
GIS has been involved in various multinational operations, both war and peacekeeping, since its creation. What follows is a list of confirmed operations in which GIS operators took part.

- 1982–1984 Lebanon, Multinational Force in Lebanon, investigation and protection activities.
- 1989–1990 Namibia, UNTAG, protection for the Italian personnel in the area.
- 1991 Turkey, Operation Provide Comfort, support to the Italian search and rescue unit.
- 1992 Cambodia, UNTAC, protection for the Italian personnel in the area.
- 1994 Israel, TIPH, protection for the Italian personnel in the area.
- 1996–2003 Bosnia, IFOR, SFOR, GIS operators fight alongside NATO troops in the area.
- 1996 Palestine, TIPH, protection for the Italian personnel in the area.
- 1997 Albania, Operation Alba, support to the Italian operations in Albania and counter rebel activity.
- 1999–2000 Kosovo, Kosovo War, peacekeeping operations and fight against crime.
- 2003–2004 Iraq, Operation Ancient Babylon, various combat and investigation activities.
- 2002–2008 Afghanistan, War in Afghanistan, counter talibans operations.
- 2008–2021 Afghanistan, ISAF, later RSM, GIS operators become part of the Italian Task Force 45 for special operations against insurgents.

== Training ==
Being an elite unit, the path that candidates have to make to access it is particularly hard and selective from the first phase which includes interviews and psycho-physical visits.

In 2011, selection was expanded to all members of the Carabinieri who are no more than 33 years old. Previously it was required that candidates be part of the 1st Paratroopers Carabinieri Regiment "Tuscania".

The course is called "G.I.S. operator with the military patent of raider", because at the end of the training process the military receives the military patent of raider, as happens in the other three Italian Special Forces already mentioned.

The candidates who apply are sent to the Tuscania Regiment. The first selection phase for the GIS involves an interview with a senior GIS officer who verifies motivation, a key element in becoming part of the unit, followed by an examination by psychologists and medical doctors. This first selection is passed by 40 per cent of the candidates.

=== Paratroopers course (nine months) ===
Candidates then begin the training process to qualify as Paracadutisti at the Tuscania Regiment, which lasts about nine months (this training is almost identical to the one carried out by the 1st Paratroopers Carabinieri Regiment "Tuscania", therefore those who come from the latter are directly introduced to the second phase, namely the specialized one for the GIS).

The course includes:

- military parachuting course (launch with tie rope)
- training in the operational use of ropes
- operational first aid course (CLS)
- land guidance and navigation techniques
- personal defence course (multiple techniques derived from different martial arts, applied to possible operational situations)
- NBCR course on operations in contaminated environments
- techniques of masking, camouflage, tactical movement, overcoming obstacles, ability to survive and operate safely in harsh environments
- patrol and platoon training (standard operating procedures for minor units, amphibious operations, reconnaissance, acquisition of targets, picketing, guerrilla techniques, anti-guerrilla warfare and special operations)
- survival techniques, evasion, resistance to interrogation and escape
- training in the use of weapons and special materials (shooting with short, medium, long arms, use of various accessories, explosive or special materials, full knowledge of communications equipment, including satellite, supplied to the department)
- combat and patrolling techniques in urban areas (MOUT / FIBUA / FIWAF)
- Military Police techniques, Counter-IED, HUMINT and for use in multinational units and commands.

The candidates who complete Paracadutisti training, about 30 per cent of the initial candidates, are admitted to the 45-week course divided into a "Basic Course" of 18 weeks (completed by about 15 per cent of the initial candidates) and a 27-week "Specialized Course". Only at this point does the soldier become operational and an effective member of the unit.

=== Basic course G.I.S. (18 weeks) ===
- Physical exercises and martial arts: in addition to intense physical exercise, candidates learn martial arts (as Judo, Brazilian Jiu-Jitsu and Muay Thai) to disarm, immobilize and, in general, to face close combat without the use of firearms
- Explosives: construction, use and neutralising of explosive devices
- Firearms: use of long and short firearms (pistols, machine guns, shotguns, assault rifles and sniper rifles), choice of the type of weapon and ammunition according to the operational scenario
- Special equipment: use of electronic surveillance equipment such as night vision devices, fiber optic cameras, microphones, as well as mechanical intrusion devices such as those used for breaking doors
- Break-in techniques: methods of breaking into buildings, vehicles, aircraft, etc.
- Climbing and descending techniques : climbing in different situations using ropes, ladders and other instruments; use of the fast rope technique for rapid descent from buildings or helicopters
- Photographic techniques: basic techniques of photography and use of cameras, video cameras, equipment for thermal and infrared recording, and image processing. Assignment to the section of the explorers/scouts will further deepen these concepts.
- Evaluation of objectives: collection of useful information for planning an action such as the robustness and type of materials of doors, windows and structures
- Shooting: shooting exercise especially against static targets using both a system known as FATS (FireArm Training System), an interactive laser system that projects images onto a screen and records all student reactions; both fire tests with real ammunition
- Police activities: arrest techniques
- English
- Escort at high risk
- First aid techniques

=== Specialized Course G.I.S. (27 weeks) ===
- Advanced shot: shooting against moving targets and, in the presence of hostages to learn to discriminate between hostile or innocent individuals in fractions of a second; shooting from difficult positions and with both hands, either alone or in a team using real ammunition.
- Advanced techniques with explosives: usage of explosives in the presence of hostages, characteristics and choice of explosives and the amount and mode of use to minimize collateral damage. Use of gas and their use with grenades of 40 mm.
- Skiing and climbing: attended at the Alpine Center of the Carabinieri in Selva di Val Gardena and in the school of Alpini ad Aosta
- Quick Guide: defensive and offensive driving techniques
- Swimming and amphibious assault: attended at the Sub Center of the Carabinieri of Genoa-Voltri, then at the COMSUBIN of Navy to learn techniques of reconnaissance, approach, assault and amphibious combat, as well as the use of equipment for ARO / ARA divers, motorboats and dinghies.
- Infrastructures: buildings, trains, planes and buses are studied, which characterize the possible theatres of use. To this end, the GIS have a very detailed archive of sensitive objectives such as embassies, public buildings, industries, as well as specific simulacra models of vehicles and aircraft to train with.
- Guerrilla and counter-guerrilla tactics: to learn the techniques commonly used by terrorists such as ambushes, counter-ambushes, neutralization of opponents, and combat in urban areas.
- Assault on Aircraft: GIS are the main aircraft assault unit in Italy. They conduct specific exercises with life-size simulacra to learn and perfect the use of explosives and other techniques for breaking doors, use of telescopic ladders, thermal sensors and other tools and techniques applicable in those situations.

Once part of GIS, training is daily and their skills are perfected with further courses:

=== Strengthening courses ===
- Parachuting course with the technique of free fall (TCL). It takes place at the Parachute Training Center (CAPAR) of Pisa for a period of between five and six weeks, during which launches are made from a maximum height of 3000–4000 metres (10,000 feet)
- Advanced parachuting course, lasting 3–4 weeks, for learning the techniques for high altitude launches (of 7.000–11.000 metres) with oxygen at low altitude opening—HALO (High Altitude Low Opening)—or with opening at high altitude and sailing under sail—HAHO (High Altitude High Opening).

=== Courses for specialties ===
- Courses for Selected shooters: only attended by the candidates of the section exploration, reconnaissance and selected shooters to learn precision shooting and snipers, concealment and camouflage techniques, coordinated fire and use of different types of weaponry and crosshairs. For coordinated fire between several shooters, they train to use the Synchropy system, which allows the action manager to see what is being framed by the individual shooters and to control the simultaneous fire.
- EOD Course (Explosive Ordinance Reclamation Operator) and IEDD Course (Improvised Explosive Ordinance Reclamation Operator)
- Course Combat Medic. At national level, the Incursori destined for this sector obtain the qualification of "Military Rescuer" at the Medical School of Rome, after a three-week course that guarantees, among other things, a sort of legal capacity to operate within the first aid, even if with significant limitations. Special Operations Combat Medics (SOCM) Course ", performed at the ISTC in Pfullendorf and teaches basic first aid procedures, such as stopping bleeding and ensuring proper infusion and shock therapy, and especially the prestigious 18D course—Special Operations Combat Medic "of the American Green Berets. With a total duration of about one year, the latter is held at Fort Bragg and is exclusively dedicated to Special Forces (for Italy, COMSUBIN, GIS and 17º Stormo Incursori also attend the course).
- Course FAC (Forward Air Controller), to qualify for the missions related to the direction from the ground of the airstrikes and the designation to the pilots of the objectives, held at the School of Aerospace Aeronautics, lasting five weeks (three theoretical and two practice). This qualification is limited to the elements in possession of the necessary level of proficiency in English (which can be achieved with the frequency of the advanced course at the SLEE in Perugia). As a rule, the course is followed by that of Fire Contractor for Special Operations (CF / OS), a further three weeks. All of this is a prelude to the Laser Target Marking function (FAC / LTM) for the use of the laser designators supplied with the Regiment. The training for the use of the relative laser designators takes place with courses of a couple of weeks, which are held in the main allied polygons (in Sardinia, as abroad), or even on the occasion of external missions, while the detachments are in the theatre of war.

=== Courses abroad ===
Finally, there are ongoing collaborative relationships with military departments, including foreign ones. In fact, other courses are held abroad by the International Special Training Center—ISTC in Pfullendorf, Germany, the NATO Special Forces school, and various joint exercises with the colleagues of the SF and Antiterrorism units of other countries (SAS—Great Britain, SWAT—USA, GSG9—Germany, GIGN—France).

== Alliances ==
GIS has very good relations with other top class CT units in the world, among these are Great Britain's SAS, Ireland's ARW & ERU, Spain's GEO and UEI, France's GIGN, United States's Hostage Rescue Team, Germany's GSG 9 and SEK, Belgium's ESI, Austria's EKO Cobra and the Netherlands's DSI.

== Weapons ==
Name	Country of origin	Type	Notes
Smith & Wesson Model 28	United States	Revolver	For backup in VIP Protection duties
Beretta 92FS	Italy	Semi-automatic pistol	Standard handgun
Beretta Px4 Storm	Italy	Semi-automatic pistol	
Caracal	UAE	Semi-automatic pistol	
Glock	Austria	Semi-automatic pistol	
Beretta 93R	Italy	Machine pistol	
Heckler & Koch MP5	Germany	Submachine gun	The most common weapon to equip GIS operators; used in A5, SD3 and KA4 versions.
Steyr TMP	Austria	Submachine gun	Employed for VIP Protection duties
Heckler & Koch MP7	Germany	Submachine gun	In limited quantities, most probably tested to supersede the Steyr TMP
FN P90	Belgium	Submachine gun	In limited quantities
Beretta PM-12	Italy	Submachine gun	Still in arsenal yet mostly superseded
Benelli M1	Italy	Shotgun	
Benelli M3	Italy	Shotgun	Replaced the older Franchi SPAS-12, Franchi PA-3, Franchi PA-7/PA-8 series and Beretta M3P shotguns
Benelli M4	Italy	Shotgun	Replaced the Franchi SPAS-15
Beretta AR70/90	Italy	Assault rifle	
Beretta ARX-160	Italy	Assault rifle	
Steyr AUG	Austria	Assault rifle	Adopted for ease of use from vehicles and helicopters, now mostly superseded
Bushmaster M4 carbine	United States	Assault rifle	Procured in limited quantities jointly with the "Tuscania" Regiment to supersede the Steyr AUG
FN SCAR	Belgium	Assault rifle	
Heckler & Koch HK53	Germany	Assault rifle	Mostly superseded; last seen fielded during Operation Ancient Babylon, sometimes paired with the British-made Istec ISL-201 40 mm undercarried grenade launcher
Heckler & Koch G36C	Germany	Assault rifle	G36 with 1.5x scope and G36C
Heckler & Koch HK416	Germany	Assault rifle	
Heckler & Koch HK417	Germany	Sniper rifle	
Heckler & Koch PSG-1	Germany	Sniper rifle	
Mauser 86-SR	Germany	Sniper rifle	Armed with synchrofire systems
Sako TRG	Finland	Sniper rifle	
Accuracy International AWP	United Kingdom	Sniper rifle	
Barrett M82	United States	Sniper rifle	
M249 light machine gun	United States	Light machine gun	
M203 grenade launcher	Italy	Grenade launcher	Either under-carried or in Stand-alone configurations; interface/mounting system for weapons, as well as some parts (most notably the receiver) manufactured in Italy by PMAL (Polo di Mantenimento delle Armi Leggere, Italian Army arsenal) in Terni

== Uniforms ==
The uniform utilized by this elite force is normally the dark blue, even though mimetic and desert variations exist. Its reinforcements such as helmets, knee pads, elbow pads or bulletproof jackets are composed of fireproof and insulating materials.

== See also ==
- Groupe d'intervention de la gendarmerie nationale
