= Giuseppe Cavo Dragone =

Italian naval officer (born 1957)

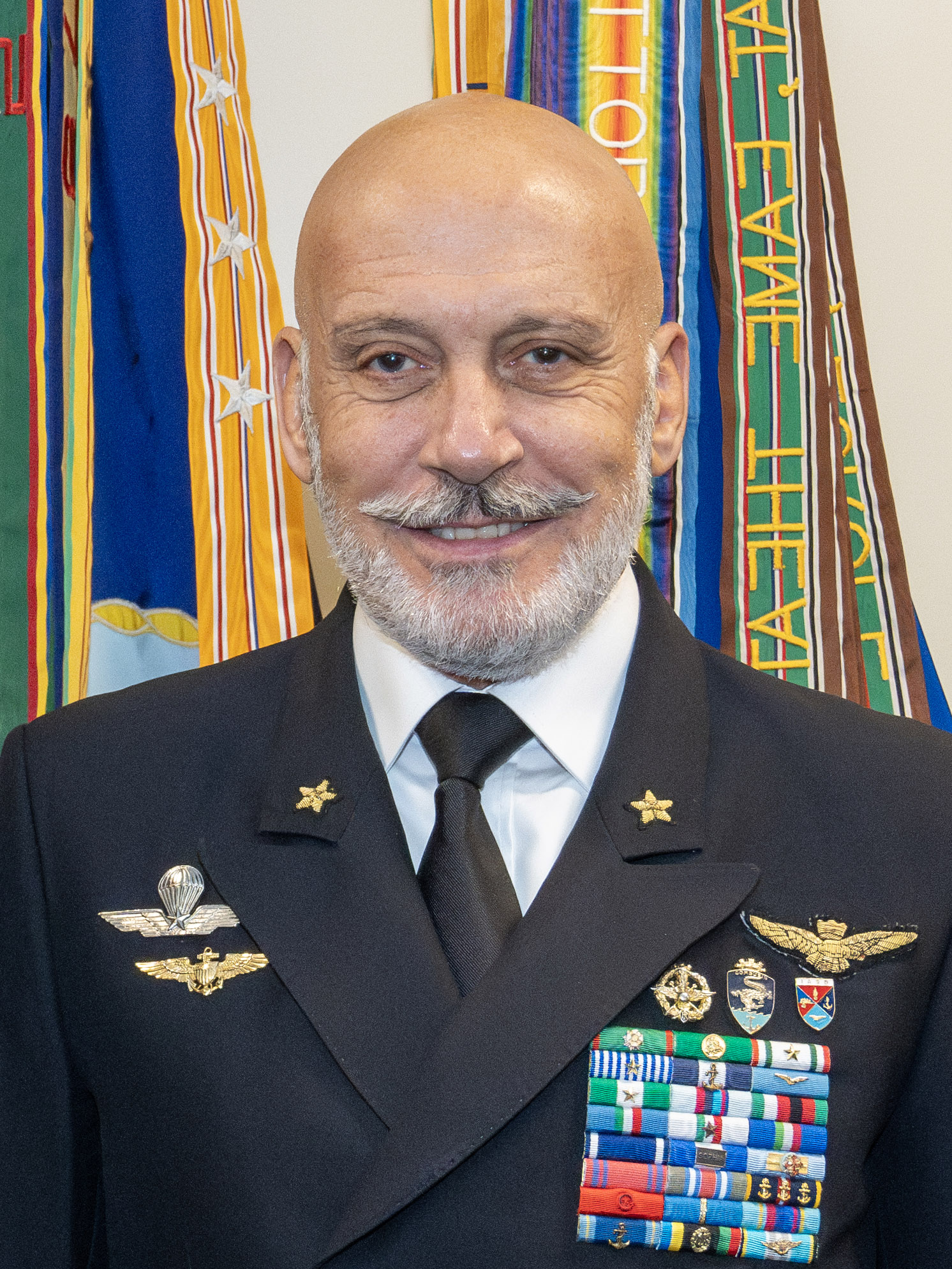
- Dragone in 2024
- Born: 28 February 1957 (age 69); Arquata Scrivia, Italy
- Spouse: Rosa Fossati
- Children: 3
- Military career
- Allegiance: Italy
- Branch: Italian Navy
- Service years: 1980–present
- Rank: Admiral (Ammiraglio)
- Commands: Chair of the NATO Military Committee; Chief of the Defense Staff; Chief of the Italian Navy; Joint Operations Command; Joint Special Forces Operations Headquarters; Superintendent, Italian Naval Academy; COMSUBIN; Air Forces Command, Italian Naval Aviation; Giuseppe Garibaldi; Euro; Operations Unit, Carrier Air Group; Milazzo
- Conflicts: Operation Enduring Freedom; Lebanese Civil War (Multinational Force in Lebanon)

Admiral Giuseppe Cavo Dragone (born 28 February 1957) is an Italian admiral, who currently serves as Chair of the NATO Military Committee since 17 January 2025.

Prior to his assumption, Dragone served as Chief of the Defense Staff from 19 October 2021 to 3 October 2024, as the Chief of Staff of the Italian Navy from 21 June 2019 to 19 October 2021, and as commander of both the Joint Operations Command and the Joint Special Forces Operations Headquarters.

== Early life and education ==
Cavo Dragone was born in Arquata Scrivia on 28 February 1957. He entered the Italian Naval Academy in Livorno in 1976 and graduated from his class in 1980. Cavo Dragone earned his Naval Aviator wings at the Naval Air Station Pensacola, Florida, in 1989. Cavo Dragone returned to the US, where entered flight courses at the Naval Air Station Meridian, and in the Marine Corps Air Station Cherry Point, and became carrier qualified on the USS Lexington in January 1990. Cavo Dragone returned to the US for the third time to enter the advanced training in Harrier Night Attack and Advanced Radar versions of the AV-8B Harrier II+ in 1993 at the Marine Corps Air Station Yuma.

Aside from military courses, Dragone also holds a master's degree in naval and maritime sciences at the University of Pisa and a master's degree in political sciences from the University of Trieste Dragone is also a certified military paratrooper, scuba diver, free fall skydiver and karate black belter for Shotokan style Karate.

== Career ==
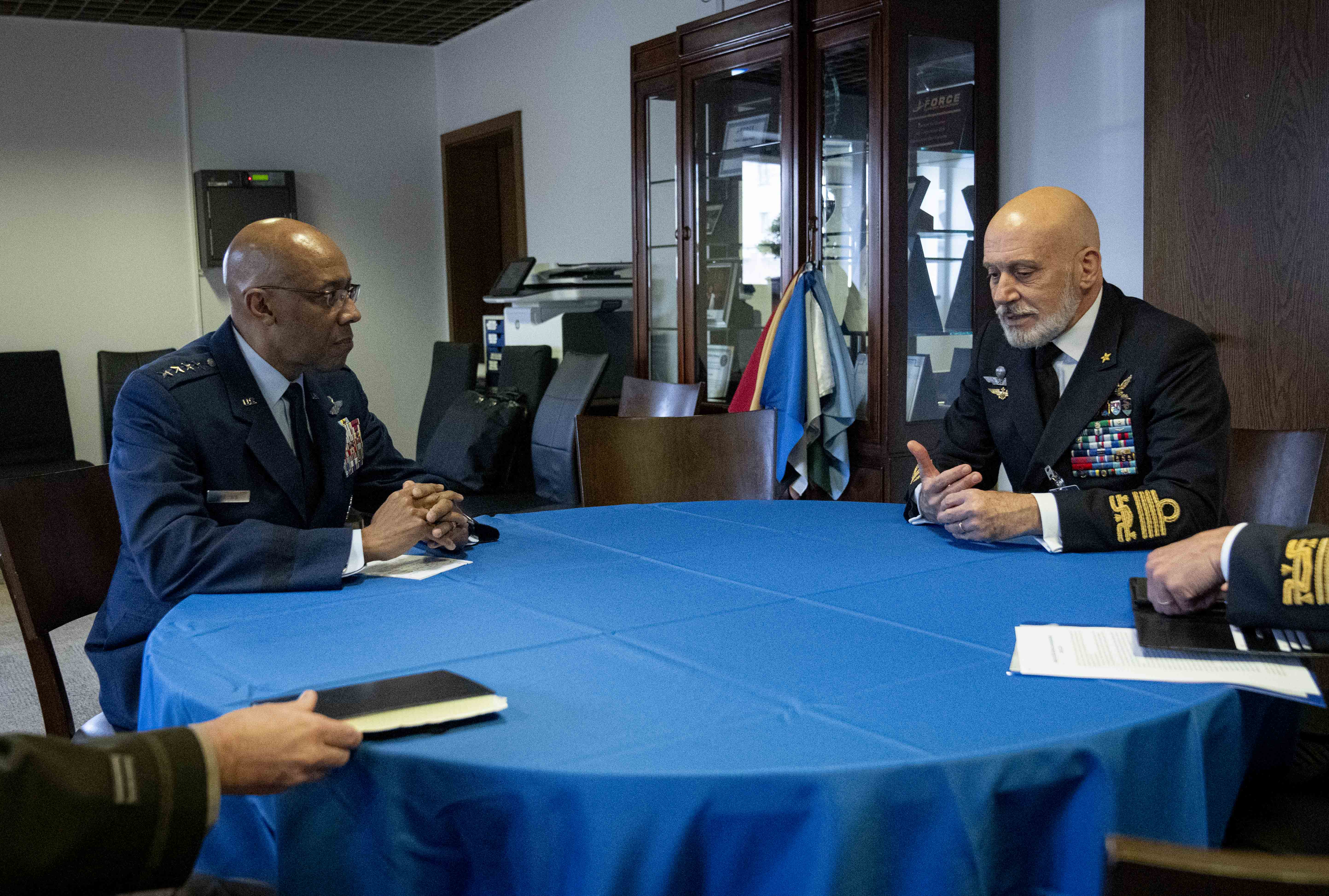
Admiral Dragone with US Chairman of the Joint Chiefs of Staff General Charles Q. Brown during the Ukraine Defense Contact Group in Ramstein Air Base, Germany

Cavo Dragone is a naval aviator and served as a helicopter pilot for nearly 7 years, before being transferred aboard frigates such as the Orsa and flew the UH-1 L Bell UH-1N Twin Huey, and the Sikorsky SH-3 Sea King helicopters. Cavo Dragone initially served as a helicopter pilot aboard the Ardito during the Lebanese Civil War as part of the Italian Forces during the Multinational Force in Lebanon. Cavo Dragone was among the few selected pilots transitioning to flying jets, where he flew the AV-8B Harrier II+ and garnered a total flight time of 2,500 hours. Cavo Dragone became a flight commander aboard the Maestrale-class frigates 1986–1987, and also served as a commanding officer in various ships in the Italian Navy. Cavo Dragone was placed in command of his first ship, the minehunter Milazzo from 1987 to 1988, before being placed as the commander of the Operations Unit (Reparto Operazioni) of the Italian Naval Aviation twice, from 1991 to 1993 and on 1997–1998.

Cavo Dragone also became commander of the frigate Euro from 1996 to 1997. In 1999–2002, Cavo Dragone was named as the head of the Research & Development Office at the Naval Aviation Department, before serving as the commander of the aircraft carrier Giuseppe Garibaldi on 27 September 2002, and served as the carrier's commander until 2004. Following the wake of the September 11 attacks, Cavo Dragone was one of the commander of the GRUPNAVIT I, the Italian Naval Task Force deployed in Afghanistan, and carried out 288 various missions such as interception operations, close air and naval support, and aircraft interdiction missions, where the aerial operations accumulated a total of 860 flight hours. On 2005–2008, Cavo Dragone was appointed as the Navy General Staff Air Warfare and eventually became the commander of the Air Forces Command of the Italian Naval Aviation.

In 2008, Cavo Dragone was appointed commander of the Italian Navy Special Forces Command (Comando Raggruppamento Subacquei e Incursori Teseo Tesei) before being appointed as the superintendent of the Italian Naval Academy in 2011 and ended his term in 2014. In January 2012, in the aftermath of the Costa Concordia disaster, Cavo Dragone was named as head of the board of experts in advising search and rescue and recovery operations on the Costa Concordia, and assisted the judge in the trial of the case regarding the disaster.

Cavo Dragone was appointed commander of the Joint Special Forces Operations Headquarters from 3 November 2014 to 26 June 2016. After his tour of duty, Cavo Dragone became the commander of the Joint Operations Command from 1 July 2016 to 20 June 2019. On 21 June 2019, Cavo Dragone replaced Admiral Valter Girardelli as Chief of the Staff of the Navy and two years later, on 19 October 2021, he was appointed by the Council of Ministers as the Chief of the Defense Staff.

On 16 September 2023, the NATO Chiefs of Defence elected Cavo Dragone as the new Chair of the NATO Military Committee, and is set to succeed Admiral Rob Bauer on January 17, 2025. Cavo Dragone ended his role as the Chief of the Defense Staff on 4 October 2024 and was succeeded by General Luciano Portolano.

== Awards in military service ==
- - 2nd Class / Grand Officer, Military Order of Italy
- – Knight Grand Cross with Collar, Order of Merit of the Italian Republic
- – Maurician medal (for 10 year military career)
- – Gold Medal of Merit of the Italian Red Cross
- – Military Medal of Merit for Long Command with gold star (20 years)
- – Silver Medal for long navigation in the Navy (10 years)
- – Air Force Military Medal for Long Air Navigation with golden eagle (20 years)
- – Gold Cross for Length of Military Service (40 years)
- – Cross Commemorating Operations in Afghanistan
- – Commemorative Medal for Navy personnel in the Persian Gulf
- – Peace Operations Commemorative Cross (Lebanon), with star for second mission
- – Commemorative Medal for anti-piracy operations
- – NATO medal for the former Yugoslavia
- – CSDP Medal Sophia (EUNAFOR), staff
- – Bailiff Knight Grand Cross of Justice, Sacred Military Constantinian Order of Saint George
- – Commander, Legion of Honour
- – Knight of the Order of the Star of Romania
- – Badge of Merit for Defense General Staff
- – Ribbon of Merit for service at the Naval General Staff (over 10 years)
- – German Sports Badge in gold
- Command Duties Bronze Medal
- Operation Enduring Freedom Medal

=== Badges ===
- Military Paratrooper Badge
- Military Scuba Diver Badge

Military offices
Preceded by Walter Girardelli	Chief of Staff of the Italian Navy; 2019–2021	Succeeded by Enrico Credendino
Preceded by Enzo Vecciarelli	Chief of the Defence Staff; 2021–2024	Succeeded by Luciano Portolano
Preceded by Rob Bauer	Chair of the NATO Military Committee; 2025–	Incumbent
