= Comando Interforze per le Operazioni Cibernetiche =

Italian government agency for cybersecurity

The Comando Interforze per le Operazioni Cibernetiche (English: Inter-force command for cybernetic operations, known as CIOC) is the Italian service of the Ministry of Defense. It covers cybersecurity. It was established in 2017 (protocol active since 16 February 2016), to protect the Italian network from cybercriminals, and attack other networks in case of necessity.

CIOC has the mandate to guarantee the OODA cycle (Observe, Orient, Decide, Act).

It was absorbed by the Network Operations Command in 2020.

== See also ==
- List of cyber warfare forces
