= Mauro Del Vecchio =

Italian politician (1946–2025)

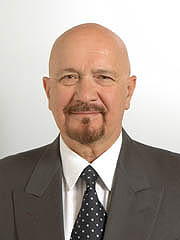
- Del Vecchio in 2005
- Born: 7 June 1946; Rome, Italy
- Died: 5 July 2025 (aged 79)
- Military career
- Allegiance: Italy
- Branch: Italian Army
- Service years: 1970–2008
- Rank: Generale di corpo d'armata (Corps general/ Lieutenant General)
- Commands: ISAF

Mauro Del Vecchio

Member of the Senate of the Republic
- In office 29 April 2008 – 14 March 2013
- Constituency: Lazio

Corps General Mauro Del Vecchio OMRI (7 June 1946 – 5 July 2025) was an Italian Army general and politician who commanded the NATO International Security Assistance Force (ISAF) in Afghanistan from August 2005 to May 2006 and was succeeded by British general David Richards.

== Life and career ==
Del Vecchio was born on 7 June 1946’ in Rome, and graduated from the Military Academy of Modena in 1967. He attended the specialization school of Turin. He subsequently earned the rank of tenente was given command of a platoon of Bersaglieri. He eventually became commander of a company of 8th Bersaglieri Regiment.

After that he attended the Scuola di Guerra (School of Warfare), and he was the commander of 1st Battalion of Bersaglieri. Then he was named commander of Florence military district. After his promotion to the rank of Generale di Brigata he led the infantry brigade Garibaldi. In the late 1990s, Del Vecchio was commander of the NATO Multinational Brigade North in Bosnia and Herzegovina (March–October 1997) and NATO Kosovo Force commander of the Multinational Brigade West in Kosovo. From September 2007 to March 2008, he was the commаnder of Joint Operations Command that oversaw the deployment of Italian forces around the world.

In the early months of 2008, he resigned from his position as commander of Comando operativo Interforze as he was running in the 2008 general election for the Democratic Party. He was elected to the Italian senate until 2013.

Del Vecchio died on 5 July 2025, at the age of 79.

Military offices
Preceded by Ethem Erdagi	Commander, International Security Assistance Force; August 2005 – May 2006	Succeeded by David Richards
