= Network Operations Command (Italy) =

- Comando per le Operazioni in Rete
- Active: 30 September 2017 - present
- Country: Italy
- Role: Cyberwarfare
- Size: Some hundreds of operators
- Part of: Joint Operations Command
- Garrison/HQ: Rome

Commanders
- Current commander: Vice Admiral Ruggiero Di Biase
- Deputy Commander: Major General Calogero Massara

The Network Operations Command (Italian: Comando per le Operazioni in Rete, COR) is an Italian cyberwarfare Joint military unit. Until its merger with the Comando C4 Difesa in 2020, it was called Joint Cybernetic Operations Command (Italian: Comando Interforze Operazioni Cibernetiche, CIOC).

== History ==
The project of an Italian cyber command, modelled on the United States Cyber Command was envisaged in the 2015 Defence White Paper. The Joint Cybernetic Operations Command, established on 30 September 2017, is intended to achieve initial operational capability by the end of 2018 and full operational capability by 2019. In 2020 CIOC was merged with Comando C4 Difesa and redenominated COR.

== Tasks ==
The Network Operations Command has tasks in the areas of information security, computer network operations, cyber warfare and cyber security. It is designed to be a force provider.

According to the former CIOC Commander, Air Force Brigadier General Francesco Vestito, the Command has two operational focus: cyber-defence and cyber network-defence. The cyber defence is related to the static defence and protection of the network, carried out in cooperation with the rest Italian military, in order to ensure the integrity of the network and the availability of the data flows. The cyber network-defence is related to the ability to carry out the vulnerability assessment and penetration test, in order to provide a quick intervention.

=== Cooperation ===
The Network Operations Command supports and protects military operations, conducts offensive operations, and functions as a coordinating body between the Italian Armed Forces and other Italian cyber security institutions.

According to Defence Undersecretary Gioacchino Alfano, the Command is intended to operate mainly in joint, inter-agency and NATO contexts, as well as in coordination with university and economic worlds.

With regard to the domestic cyber security organization, the Department of Information Security has the leadership, via the Deputy Director responsible for cyber security; the operational arms are the Joint Cybernetic Operations Command and the State Police CNAIPIC (Centro Anticrimine Informatico per la Protezione delle Infrastrutture Critiche, Critical Facilities Anti-Informatic Crime Protection Centre), as well as the national CERT. Some other Ministries are linked to the national CERT through their own cyber infrastructures.

== Organization ==
The Command is directly dependent on the Chief of the Defence Staff of the Italian Armed Forces; in particular, it depends on the Deputy Commander for Operations.

The Network Operations Command is currently organized as follows:

- Command (Comando)
- Administrative Office (Ufficio Amministrazione)
- Prevention and Protection Service (Servizio Prevenzione e Protezione)
- C4 Unit (Reparto C4), controls the Italian Defense Communication Network (DIFENET) and provides technical, logistical and configuration support to the Italian Joint C4 structure as a whole. It is organized on:
  - Networks and Data Center Office (Ufficio Reti e Data Center)
  - Centralized Systems and Software Office (Ufficio Sistemi ed Applicativi Centralizzati)
  - ICT Operability Office (Ufficio Operatività ICT).
- Security and Cyber Defense Unit (Reparto Sicurezza e Cyber Defence), controls the security of High Command ICT hardware and software assets. It is organized on:
  - Defense CERT Office (Ufficio CERT Difesa)
  - Security Facilities Office (Ufficio Infrastrutture di Sicurezza)
  - Classified Systems Office (Ufficio Sistemi Classificati.
- Cyber Operations Office (Reparto Cyber Operations), controls both the active side of the cyber defense operations and the training activities. It is organized on:
  - Training Office (Ufficio Addestramento)
  - Cybernetic Activities Office (Ufficio Attività Cibernetiche)
  - Operations Office (Ufficio Operazioni)

The Command is to recruit also personnel not part of the military.

The operational unit handles the Cyber Operational Cells, which are the actual operational pawns; those cells are tasked to operate on the field under the field commander, who may employ them in order to achieve his or her operational goals.

The Command was located near the military intelligence service Centro Intelligence Interforze in Castel Malnome near Rome, not far from Leonardo da Vinci–Fiumicino Airport. It is now located near the Forte Trionfale in Rome.

== See also ==
- List of cyber warfare forces
