= Marco Bertolini =

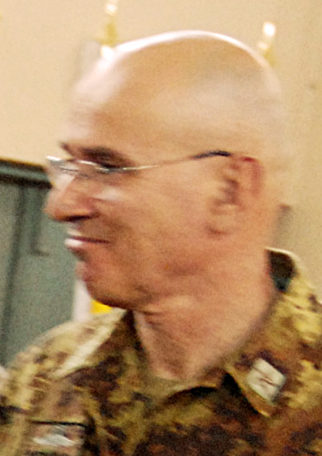

Marco Bertolini (born 21 June 1953) is an Italian general, former commander of the Joint Operations Command (from 2004 to 2008) and of the Paratroopers Brigade "Folgore" (from 2002 to 2004). Since April 2017 President of the National Paratroopers Association of Italy.
