= Italian special forces =

Special forces units of the Italian Military

The Italian Special Forces include special forces units from several branches of the Italian Armed Forces: the Esercito Italiano (Army), the Marina Militare (Navy), the Aeronautica Militare (Air force) and the Arma dei Carabinieri (Gendarmerie).

The Comando operativo interforze delle forze speciali (Joint Special Forces Operations Headquarters) is responsible for operations carried out in response to Defense requirements.

== Italian Army special units ==
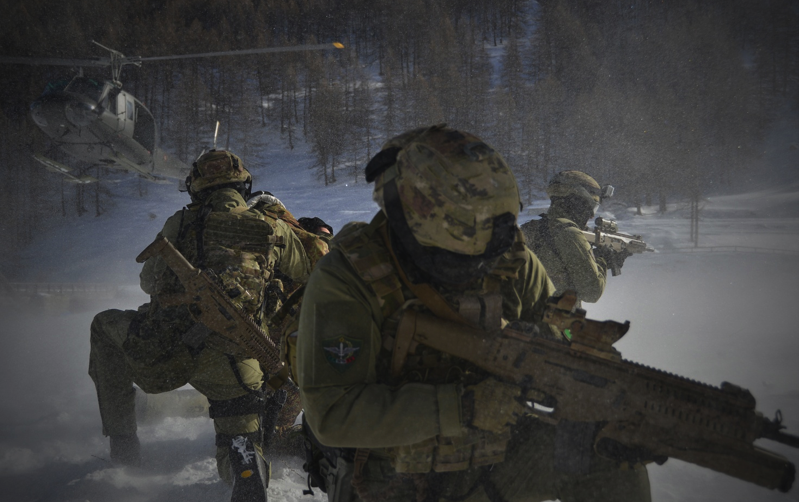
Italian soldiers of the 4th Alpini Parachutist Regiment with ARX 160A2 rifles awaiting helicopter extraction

- 9th Paratroopers Assault Regiment "Col Moschin", is a force trained for special operations in various environments. They carry the legacy of the Arditi units of the Italian Army, which operated on the Italian-Austrian Front during World War I.
- 4th Alpini Paratroopers Regiment, is a Ranger type infantry alpini regiment, specializing in mountain combat, and a special force trained for special operations in all kinds of environments, with special skills in skiing and climbing and resistance to cold, stress and fatigue. The 4th is best suited for high-altitude operations. Its operational battalion carries the legacy of the Alpine Skiers Battalion "Monte Cervino", an elite battalion of the Alpini Corps, that distinguished itself during World War I and World War II.
- 185th Paratroopers Reconnaissance Target Acquisition Regiment "Folgore" (abbreviated as 185th RRAO) is a unit of the Italian Army, included in the special forces since 2018, made up of specifically selected and trained personnel, particularly trained and equipped to lead the entire spectrum of the typical tasks of the "Special Operations", particularly specialized in the conduct of Special Reconnaissance and Terminal Guidance Operations.

== Italian Navy special units ==
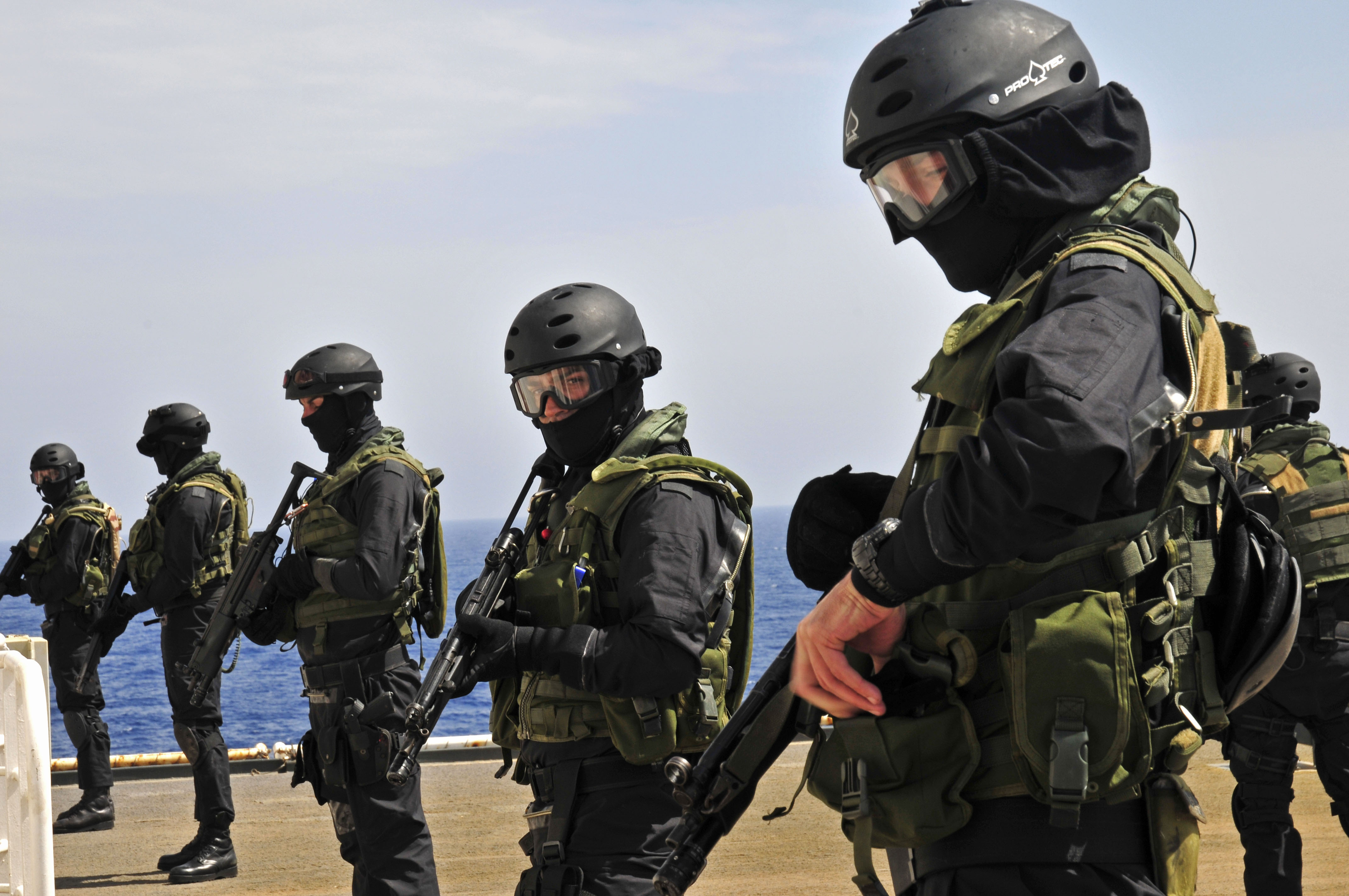
Frogmen of the COMSUBIN

The Italian Navy special forces unit is the Divers and Raiders Grouping "Teseo Tesei" (Comando Raggruppamento Subacquei e Incursori Teseo Tesei - COMSUBIN). Specifically the 250-350 men of the Operational Raiders Group are the special forces section of the elite unit.

- GOI (Gruppo Operativo Incursori) - is the branch with raiders; they are trained for naval/land operation are also trained for special operations in all kinds of environments like British SBS, forward air controller, counter terrorism ...(but are also used on the mountains of Afghanistan in operation ISAF), are also equipped with special weapons over/under water vehicles for silent insertions.
- GOS (Gruppo Operativo Subacquei) - is the diver's branch for rescue tasks and damage inspection / repair of vessels and/or submarines. They're even specialized as underwater E.O.D.

COMSUBIN's origins lie with the famous Italian special units "X MAS" (Italian acronym for Anti Submarine Motorboats). The name referred to an early vehicle employed by the units, an explosive-laden crewless motorboat ("barchino") which was aimed and launched against enemy submersibles (keep in mind that until well after World War II subs were essentially surface ships with the capability of temporarily diving underwater for attacks). After World War I much study and development went into underwater raid techniques but the unit's name was never altered, leading to the false impression that Italian seafaring commandos were still relegated to anti-submarine warfare only. Instead many flotillas were armed and equipped to direct raids on enemy ships using explosive head-charges in guided torpedoes with 2-man crews (Siluri a Lenta Corsa or S.L.C.), with hand explosive charges (by frogmen) or with small, fast, self-explosive boats (S.M.A.).

- Sometimes called upon to intervene for special operations the Special Company of the 1° San Marco Marine Regiment.

Also the raiders approached the target by means of submarines with special tanks installed on the external bridge containing the special vehicles (S.L.C.).

- Reparto Eliassalto REA (Heliborne Assault Unit) - special helicopters unit trained to support, supply, infiltrate/exfiltrate SF amphibious units in enemy territory.

== Italian Air Force special units ==
- 17º Stormo Incursori the raiders corp of Italian Air Force. Its primary missions: raids on aeronautical compounds, forward air control, combat controlling, and combat search and rescue. Its origins are in the A.D.R.A Arditi Distruttori Regia Aeronautica (Royal Air Force Brave Destroyers), a corp of World War II. They were used in not-well-known missions against bridges and allied airfields in North Africa after the fall of Tunisia. The only well-known mission reported the destruction with explosive charges of 25 B-24s & other airplanes and the killing of some bomber crew members.
- 9º Stormo Francesco Baracca - a special helicopters unit trained to support, supply, infiltrate/exfiltrate SF and SOF units in enemy territory.

== Carabinieri Corps special units ==
The Carabinieri is a corp of Gendarmerie with both (civil and military) law-and-order police duties, military police, and military peacekeeping and war-fighting capabilities.

- The Carabinieri has its own special forces in the form of the Gruppo di Intervento Speciale or the Special Intervention Group. The GIS features some one hundred or so troops specially trained in counter-terrorism operations with a special emphasis on marksmanship.

The special unit SOF is the "1st Company" of the 1st Carabinieri Airborne Regiment Tuscania. It is a regiment of paratroopers for military police and anti-terrorism. The usual roles:

- military, common with all other airborne/special operation forces troops;
- law-enforcement, supporting the Carabinieri law-enforcement units in dangerous areas (homeland security e.g. mafia-controlled zones, violent criminal confrontations and any operation in which, translating from the official Carabinieri website, "extremely violent firearm clashes are foreseen") and VIP escort and security service.

== See also ==
- Joint Operational Command of the Special Forces (Italy)
