= Military Academy of Modena =

Italian military school

Coordinates: 44°38′54″N 10°55′46″E

- Accademia militare di Modena
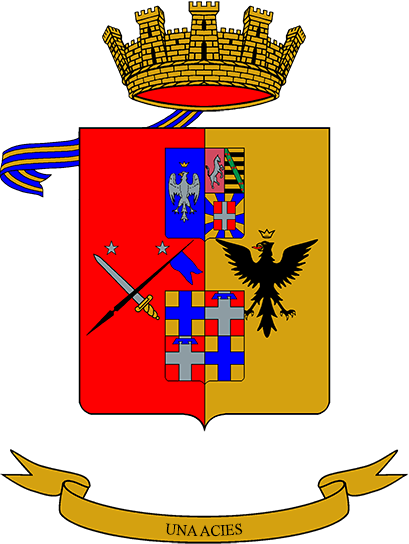
- Motto: UNA ACIES "one rank of troops"
- Type: military university
- Established: January 1, 1678, in Turin
- Students: future military officers in the Italian Army/Carabinieri, elite foreign cadets
- Location: Modena, Italy
- Campus: Ducal Palace of Modena
- Website: Military Academy of Modena

The Military Academy of Modena (Italian: Accademia militare di Modena) is a military university in Modena, northern Italy. Located in the Ducal Palace of Modena in the historic center of the city, it was the first such military institution to be created in the world.

The academy is open for enrollment to both sexes, and focuses on the initial training and selection of future military officers in the Italian Army or in the Carabinieri.

A typical course of study is at least two years in duration. Upon the successful completion of the syllabus, the trainee can then either go on to study another three years at the Military Research Institute of Turin or at the Carabinieri Officer Candidate School in Rome.

== History ==
The academy was founded in 1678 in Turin, then part of the Duchy of Savoy.

In 1669, Duke Charles Emmanuel II devised the creation of an academy to provide competent military leaders who would be faithful to the House of Savoy. He subsequently began designing the layout and gathering the staff and funds necessary for the construction of such an academy. The institution would be completed many years later due to the Duke's premature death. On January 1, 1678, the Duchess Marie Jeanne Baptiste of Savoy-Nemours, the state regent, opened the Royal Academy. As such, it is the first military institution of its kind in the world, preceding the Artillery School in Saint Petersburg (1717), the Royal Military Academy (1741) of Woolwich, London, the École Militaire in Paris (1750), and United States Military Academy in West Point (1802).

The design and construction of Turin's Royal Academy were entrusted to the Court Architect Amedeo di Castellamonte, whose design housed the academy until 1943. The aerial bombardments of World War II destroyed the entire complex; a portion of the colonnade was gathered together and carried in 1960 to Modena, where it was reassembled in the courtyard of the Palazzo Ducale, which was thus renamed the "Courtyard of the Military Academy of Turin."

The Modena location of this academy can trace its roots back to the "Academy and Conference of Military Architecture" founded by Duke Francesco III d'Este in 1756. In 1798, Napoleon Bonaparte expanded the academy's curriculum to include a military engineering school and artillery school, and it trained all Army officers in Italy until 1814. Following the Restoration, the Duke Francis IV of Austria-Este founded another expansion, the Military Academy of Nobility, which was later opened to young people without noble titles. On the initiative of General Manfredo Fanti, in 1859 a Central Military School was founded, which became the Military School of Infantry in 1860, on the eve of the proclamation of the Kingdom of Italy in 1861.

Further schools were added and recombined in later years: the Military Infantry and Cavalry in 1865 and the Military Academy of Artillery and Engineers in the early 1900s, based on the original school designed by Napoleon. In 1923, the two schools were reorganized as the Military Academy of Infantry and Cavalry (Modena) and the Military Academy of Artillery and Engineers (Torino), acquiring the title of Royal Academies in 1928.

Since 1937 the Military Academy of Modena has also hosted courses for the training of officers of the Carabinieri, from 1933 to 1936 were also hosted the 37th and 38th Officer's Course of the Royal Guard. In 1943, the two institutions were suspended, which resumed their function in May 1944 at the barracks of Pico Lecce as a Special Commando Royal Military Academy. After the end of the war and the fall of the monarchy, the Military Academy in Modena (1947) became unified by decision of the then Chief of Staff of the Italian Army Raffaele Cadorna.

Among the alumni of the academy are 31 ministers, 6 Prime Ministers, and 33 senators.

To commemorate the founding of the Military Academy of Modena, the Post Office of Rome issued a .41 stamp featuring the academy flag and crest in 1999.

== Hierarchy ==
The academy is led by a Division General and the Command Office run by his deputy, a Brigadier General. There are two branches within the academy: the Academic Department and the Student Regiment.

=== Academic Department ===
The Academic Department is run by a Colonel who has a secretariat and four departments under him, which are responsible for the didactic activity of the institute. The departments are:

- Department of university studies and relations: responsible for the organization of lessons and university activities and relations with the University of Modena and Reggio Emilia as well as other universities.
- Department of physical education: responsible for the psycho-physical preparation of the students and managing the sports events
- Department of didactics and quality control: specialized in internal quality control of studies.
- Department of foreign languages: responsible for teaching foreign languages

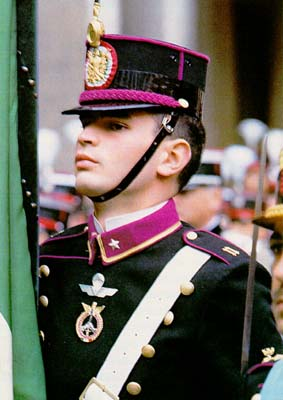
Student of the academy in historical uniform

=== Student Regiment ===
The Student Regiment, also led by a Colonel, has three battalions of students, a majority section, a training section and a Command Office. The Command Office and the majority section guarantee the good functioning of the department, while the other sections focus on training activities. The three battalions are divided as such:

Battalion	Units	Branch
1st Battalion	1st Company Student Officers; 2nd Company Student Officers; 3rd Company Student Officers	Italian Army
2nd Battalion	5th Company Student Officers; 6th Company Student Officers; 7th Company Student Officers	Italian Army
3rd Battalion	4th Company Student Officers; 8th Company Student Officers	Carabinieri

== Training and studies ==
The Military Academy is a demanding training course for young people, and the training falls into various subcultural, military and sports-related elements. The courses of study are of various types and duration:

- The various weapons, transport, administrative commands, and materials involved in military operations, a two-year course that continues for another three years at the School of Application of Turin for more advanced officers.
- Carabinieri officers undergo a two-year course that continues at the School Officers in Rome with two years of application and a year of specialization, and confers a MA Degree in Law.
- The corps of engineers follows a three-year course that continues for two years at the School of Application (Engineering).
- Veterinarians, chemists follow a course of five years (in Veterinary Science, Chemistry and Pharmaceutical Technology).
- Doctors follow a course of six years (Degree in Medicine and Surgery).

The military academy also promotes and provides "military preparation", a term they use to mean required topics all officers should know, which includes:

- Ethics and the art of military command (attachment to the institution and the state, as well as professional ethics and a sense of honor)
- Weapons, topography, English and NATO terminology
- Cartography, political science, mechanics, fluid mechanics, engineering management.

Obviously, every department has some officers specializing in some of these disciplines, but there is much cross training. The sports training includes gymnastics, defensive melee combat, swimming, riding and target shooting.

In addition to these theoretical activities (except for sports), students need a specialized technique that is manifested in military training practice. These activities are mostly mock exercises with small arms and armor, training in hand-to-hand fighting, learning how to maintain cohesion when getting to battlefields and military orientation and direction finding.

Every study course has a final exam and there are also summer training camps, and winter training in the snow.

The years of study are divided as follows:

- First year, team commander capable of combating in mountainous or woodsy terrain and in cities; capable of parachute jumps or has attended a military cavalry course; attended an English course and driving school. During the month of February, the students gain their first hands-on experience with individual and department arms, with the individual combat techniques (A.I.C), with orientation and observation techniques and all battlefield activities.
- Second year, chosen patrolman who has successfully completed the corse with the same name commonly referred to as the daring course by passing a final exam with the simulation of combat. This course is held in July on the Apennines near Modena for the aspiring field marshals, while for the other personnel it is held at the Infantry School of Cesano and it tests individual combat skills, as well as command and leadership skills in all types of combat. This is a very important exam for students as it is necessary for the promotion to second lieutenant and the beginning of the three year specialization at the Scuola di applicazione e Istituto di Studi Militari in Turin.

The students who pass this course will be able to put the black ribbon with a red background of the "chosen patrolman" on their uniforms

== Heraldry ==
The Coat of Arms of the academy was instituted by the decree of the Prime Minister Francesco Cossiga in 1987. It is shaped like a modern French shield with red and gold; it has four coats of arms on it. From the left going clockwise: the coat of arms of the Academy of Infantry and Cavalry of Modena, a shield with the coats of arms the d'Este family and the founder of the Royal Academy, the Savoy family, the coat of arms of the Academy of Artillery and Strategy of Turin, and a shield divided in fourths with the coat of arms of Modena and the symbols of the Piedmont region. The turreted crown above the coat of arms represents the Republic. Under the shield is the motto: “UNA ACIES” (Latin, a single rank of troops).

== Number and name of classes ==
Every class has a number. This tradition was begun at the first schools in both Turin and Modena, each based on when they were founded in 1815 and 1860 respectively. When the school was reopened after the second world war, they decided to unify the schools and began numbering from zero. However, in 1968, it was decided to use the original Turin numbering, beginning with the 150th class. Some numbers are missing or out of order due to wartime activities when classes were accelerated or skipped altogether. Each class, along with its number, is given a motto, assigned from among twenty different names, so classes have the same name every twenty years, and there are ceremonies to honor the classes both forty and twenty years behind the current one.

== Notable alumni ==
- Siad Barre, the 3rd president of Somalia
- Abdullahi Yusuf Ahmed, the 6th president of Somalia
- Arthur Fonjallaz, Swiss Brigadier General, politician and publisher
- Asim Zeneli, Albanian military commander and politician
- Biagio Abrate, Italian General and Chief of Defence Staff of Italy
- Charles Cornwallis, British Army officer who surrendered at Yorktown during the American Revolution
- Edmondo De Amicis, Italian novelist, journalist, poet and short-story writer
- Francesco Baracca, Italian World War I ace pilot
- Francesco Vida, Italian military officer and skier
- Gaetano Cozzi, Italian historian and professor
- Gaetano Giardino, Italian Marshal
- Gerolamo Emilio Gerini, Italian academic and diplomat
- Janko Vukotić, Montenegrin General
- Leopoldo Nobili, Italian physicist
- Luigi Ugolini, Italian writer
- Mauro del Vecchio, Italian General and Senator of the Republic of Italy
- Muse Hassan Sheikh Sayid Abdulle, Somali Brigadier General and acting President of Somalia
- Nicola Bellomo, Italian General
- Pier Ruggero Piccio, Italian aviator and founding Chief of Staff of the Italian Air Force
- Pietro Maletti, Italian Major General
- Riccardo Fedel, Italian guerilla leader and political activist
- Robert William Wilcox, Hawaiian revolutionary soldier and politician
- Stefano Zappalà, Italian politician and Member of the European Parliament
