= Joint Operations Command (Italy) =

Joint Operations Headquarters
- Comando Operativo di Vertice Interforze
- Active: 10 December 1998 - Present
- Country: Italy
- Role: Joint operations
- Part of: Defence Staff
- Garrison/HQ: Centocelle Airport

Commanders
- Current commander: Gen. C.A. I.S. Giovanni Maria Iannucci
- Deputy Commander: Gen. S.A. Silvano Frigerio
- Chief of Staff: Amm. Div. Valter Zappellini

The Joint Operations Headquarters (Italian: Comando Operativo di Vertice Interforze, COVI) is the Italian joint operational command directly reporting to the Chief of the Defence Staff. This command exercises the planning, coordination and direction of the military operations of the Italian armed forces, and on joint and multinational exercises and all activities connected to them. Through the COVI, the Chief of the Defence Staff is able to exercise his functions as Operational Commander of the Armed Forces.

== History ==
The Joint Operations Headquarters was established in 1998 in order to provide the Chief of the Defence Staff of the means to direct the whole operational activity of the Italian Armed Forces.

After the provision enshrined in the law, the Activation Cell of the Command was established on 13 August 1997; on 18 March 1998 the Cell was upgraded to Initial Formation Team of the Joint Operations Command, and on 10 December 1998 the Command assumed operational duties. Eventually, on 1 November 1999 the Command reached the full operating capability. At first, headquarters were placed in the military citadel of the Cecchignola". In 1998 the seat was moved to Centocelle Airport.

The Joint Operations Headquarters (COI) has been the body employed by the Chief of the Defence Staff in charge of planning, coordinating and directing the military operations of the Italian Armed Forces and multinational exercises. The Command was also in charge of managing the requests and execution of the competition activities of the Italian Armed Forces on the occasion of natural disasters or extraordinary events.

Over the years, a number of joint commands were set up that remained excluded from the jurisdiction of the COI. These commands direct the special forces, the cyber component and the space component.

On 26 July 2021 the Command was upgraded and renamed from Joint Operations Command (Comando Operativo Interforze, COI) to Joint Summit Operations Command (Comando Operativo di Vertice Interforze, COVI) with its Commander being promoted from a "plain" Lieutenant General to a Lieutenant General of rank equal to Service Chiefs.

The new version of the Command was introduced in order to facilitate the coordination of the joint operational components, which continue to remain directly under the Chief of the Defence Staff, in the five domains (land, sea, sky, space and cyber) maintaining the principle of uniqueness of command.

The restructured Command also includes subordinate commands COFS, COR and COS in order to unify the command in the five domains and in such a way as to become the focal point of the operational components.

=== Commanders ===
From 1998 to 2021 the Command had been held by a three-star general/flag officer. Since 26 July 2021, the COVI has been led by a three-star general/flag officer "with special duties", senior in rank to ordinary three-star general/flag officers.

	Rank	Name	Service branch	Took office	Left office	Term length	Notes
1	Gen. C.A.	Giuseppe Orofino	Italian Army	13 August 1997	7 August 2001	3 years, 359 days	
2	Gen. C.A.	Carlo Cabigiosu	Italian Army	7 August 2001	23 June 2002	320 days	
3	Gen. C.A.	Filiberto Cecchi	Italian Army	23 June 2002	11 July 2005	3 years, 18 days	Later Chief of Staff of the Italian Army
4	Gen. C.A.	Fabrizio Castagnetti	Italian Army	11 July 2005	5 September 2007	2 years, 56 days	Later Chief of Staff of the Italian Army
5	Gen. C.A.	Mauro Del Vecchio	Italian Army	5 September 2007	7 March 2008	184 days	
6	Gen. C.A.	Giuseppe Valotto	Italian Army	7 March 2008	17 September 2009	1 year, 194 days	Later Chief of Staff of the Italian Army
7	Gen. S.A.	Tommaso Ferro	Italian Air Force	17 September 2009	10 May 2010	235 days	
8	Gen. C.A.	Giorgio Cornacchione	Italian Army	10 May 2010	6 February 2012	1 year, 272 days	
9	Gen. C.A.	Marco Bertolini	Italian Army	6 February 2012	1 July 2016	4 years, 146 days	
10	Amm. Sq.	Giuseppe Cavo Dragone	Italian Navy	1 July 2016	20 June 2019	2 years, 354 days	Later Chief of Staff of the Italian Navy
11	Gen. D.A.	Nicola Lanza de Cristoforis	Italian Air Force	21 June 2019	1 September 2019	72 days	Acting
12	Gen. C.A. i.s.	Luciano Portolano	Italian Army	2 September 2019	8 October 2021	2 years, 36 days	On 26 July 2021, General Portolano was promoted to Army Corps General with Special Tasks but retained the command of the newly upgraded C.O.V.I. until 8 October 2021.
13	Gen. C.A. i.s.	Francesco Paolo Figliuolo	Italian Army	15 December 2021	Incumbent	3 years, 111 days	On 15 December 2021, General Figliuolo was appointed C.O.V.I. Commander but retained the post of Extraordinary Commissioner for the COVID-19 Emergency.

== Mission ==
The Command is the articulation through which the Chief of Defense Staff exercises the functions of Operational Commander of the Italian Armed Forces.

The Command also has the function of managing and coordinating the interventions of the individual Armed Forces in the event of emergencies and natural disasters on the national territory, the task of developing the methodologies for the simulation of strategic and operational scenarios, as well as contributing to the elaboration of the military doctrine of NATO and of the other international organizations of which Italy is a part.

== Organization ==
The COVI is a joint command, made up in every component of military personnel from the four Italian Armed Forces, as well as civilian defense personnel. However, as of 2005, the COI mainly consisted of Army personnel:

- Army 41%
- Navy 21%
- Air Force 31%
- Carabinieri 7%.

The Joint Operations Command is organized as follows:

- Commander
  - Commander's Secretariat;
  - Office of the Commander;
  - Legal Office;
  - Deputy Commander;
  - General Staff;
  - Italian Joint Force Headquarters;
  - Headquarters.

=== Legal Office ===
In 2001 a first Legal Unit was established, and later evolved into an Office. The Legal Office of the Joint Operations Command provides legal counseling to the Commander, to the divisions of the Command and to the operational theaters, both in the legal field and in the context of the military police activities of the units present in missions and operations abroad.

In particular, the Legal Office examines the legal aspects connected with joint operations and exercises, provides sectoral technical support in the planning and conduct of operations and exercises, takes care of the preparation of disciplinary and criminal directives in operational theaters. In addition, the Legal Office analyzes the legislative provisions and the acts of parliamentary inspection in its areas of competence, verifies the harmonization of the rules of engagement and operational orders, supports the Italian Defense Staff in drafting of technical agreements.

With regard to the military police activities, the Legal Office handles the activities of the judicial police for investigations delegated by the Judicial Authority for events that have occurred in the national territory and in the operational theatres and collaborates with the ordinary judicial authority and with the police authorities in investigations.

=== General Staff ===
The General Staff of the Joint Operations Command is in charge to oversee all operations under the purview of the Command. It is organized with three branches:

- Office of the Chief of Staff;
- Operations Department;
- Operations Support Department.

The Operations Department is responsible for planning, conducting, monitoring and evaluating the all effects of all operations. The department is also responsible for Operational Planning (contingency and urgency), as well as the organization and coordination of joint, national, inter-ministerial and multinational exercises. In addition, it contributes to the General Defense Planning. Its facility includes the Joint Operation Centre.

The Operational Support Department is responsible for coordinating the design, construction and maintenance of all the infrastructures in the operational theater of national interest in the joint area. The department manages the personnel assigned to the operational theatres, the logistical and health structures of the operations and the financial activities of the Contingents. The Department coordinates, controls and identifies the priorities of the movements and transport of forces to and from the operational theatres and regulates the operational aspects connected with telecommunications and IT systems.

=== Italian Joint Forces Headquarters ===
The Italian Joint Force Headquarters (ITA-JFHQ) is a joint Command, set up in 2007 in order to have a joint Command and Control element able to deploy quickly outside the national territory and to be able to manage a military device articulated on the five war domains. The Command has very high operational readiness: entry into the theatre of the first elements within 24 hours after the order is given.

The ITA-JFHQ is permanently activated and is led by a Brigadier General (or corresponding rank). The Command has a small staff (about 30 units) characterized by flexibility and streamlined organizational structure.

The Command is able to plan and conduct small scale operations operating both on land and from the sea, under the control of the Italian Chief of Defence Staff or, in the case of joint operations with the armed forces of other countries, under the control of the designated military authority. It may use Joint Rapid Reaction Force assets.

Among the main tasks, the ITA-JFHQ plans and conducts:

- Non-combatant evacuation operations;
- Small scale operations (Early Entry Force);
- Disaster relief;
- Humanitarian assistance;
- the detachment of individual elements or operational reconnaissance and liaison teams, completely independent from a technical and logistical point of view;
- the deployment of the entire Command Post, assisted by a support unit set up for tactical-logistic support (logistics, communications, Force Protection), in order to conduct small joint operations;
- the deployment of a Command Post as an advanced party of a larger national unit subsequently deployed for the conduct of larger scale operations.

The Command has been used both abroad and on the Italian national territory.

=== Subordinate commands ===
Since 2021, the Command controls the joint commands:

- Joint Special Forces Operations Headquarters (Comando interforze per le Operazioni delle Forze Speciali, COFS);
- Network Operations Command (Comando delle Operazioni in Rete, COR);
- Space Operations Command (Comando per le Operazioni Spaziali, COS).

== See also ==
- Chief of the Defence Staff (Italy)
