= 17th Raiders Wing =

- 17º Stormo Incursori
- Active: 1 March 2003 – present
- Country: Italy
- Branch: Italian Air Force
- Type: Special forces
- Role: Special operations
- Size: 2 Group
- Part of: Comando interforze per le Operazioni delle Forze Speciali (Joint Special Forces Operations Command)

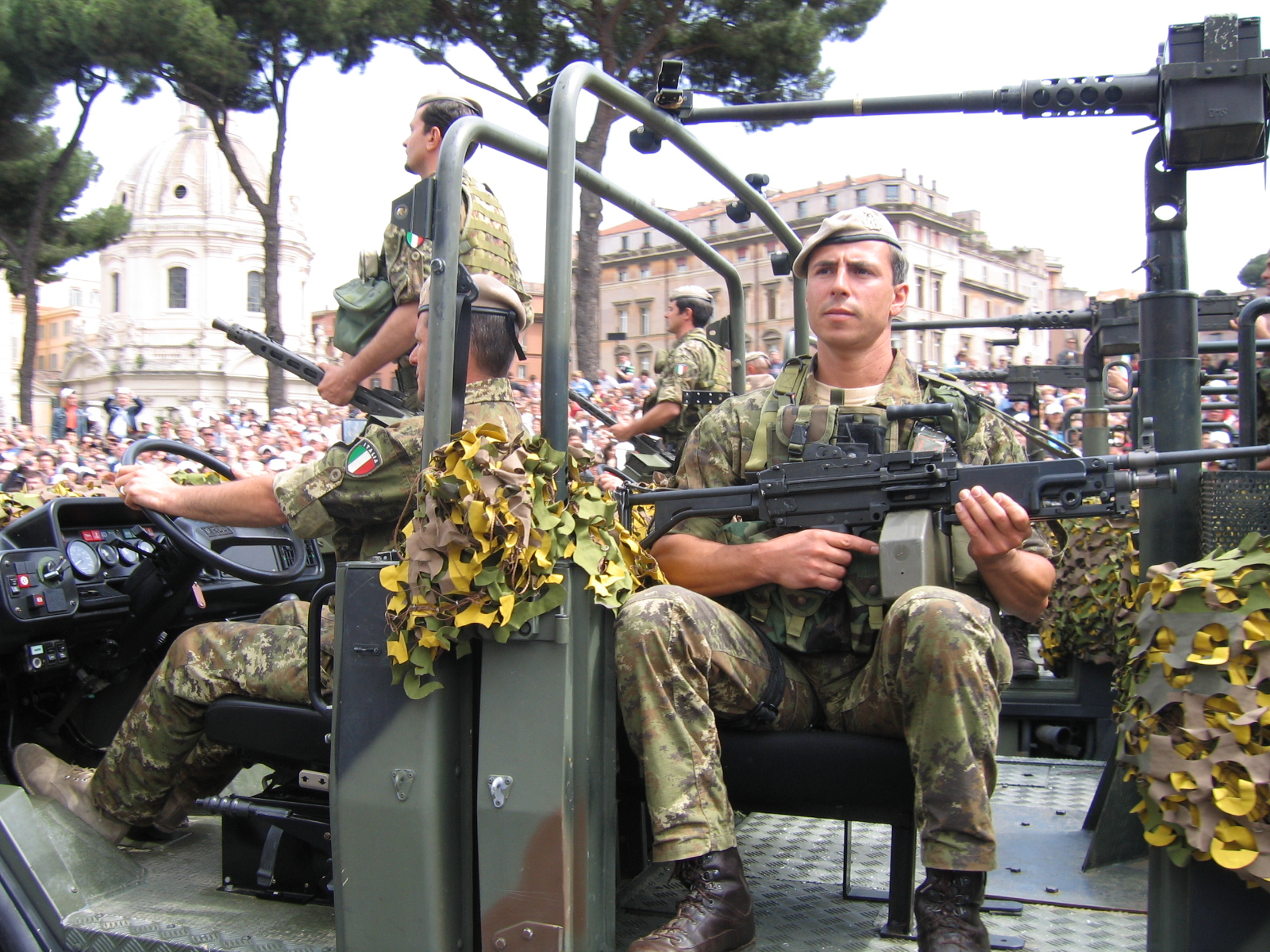
17º Stormo Incursori Operator

The 17th Raiders Wing (Italian: 17º Stormo Incursori) is the Italian Air Force special forces unit. It is the youngest special force created in Italy. It is based in Furbara, near Rome and part of the Comando interforze per le Operazioni delle Forze Speciali (COFS—Special Forces Operations Command). Until 8 April 2008 the unit was named Reparto Incursori Aeronautica Militare (RIAM—Air Force Raiders Group) but with the expansion and evolution of the unit's assignments and its size, the name was changed to "17° Stormo Incursori".

== Specialisations and capabilities ==
- Hostage Rescue Operations (HRO)
- Counterterrorism (Mostly Abroad)
- Direct actions Against HVT (High Value Targets)
- Military Assistance (MA)
- Special Reconnaissance (SR)
- Close Protection Units (Specialized in Abroad V.I.P. CPT)
- Non-Conventional Warfare
- Precision Airstrikes Against HVT (Special Ops. JTAC+ Capabilities)
- Tactical Interdictions (Specialized against Airbases and Aeronautical Site of interest)
- Combat Controller (CCT US/NATO Certified)
- Combat Search and Rescue (C-SAR, SOCM Capabilities)
- Combat Weatherman (SOWT)
- Pathfinder in Non-Permissive Environments

== Organization ==
=== Raiders Group ===
Raiders Group divided into Command, Operations, Vehicles and Special Equipment, and four squadriglie (wings) of raiders, each of two to four detachments of eight to twelve soldiers. This means that the entire operational force will be (at full strength) from 64 to 192 soldiers.

=== Training Group ===
This branch provides training for the operational main force but is also capable of providing training sessions on Evasion and Escape and EOD/EOR/IEDD to other Italian army and navy units.

== Vehicles and equipment ==
17th Raiders Wing is part of 1st Special Ops Air Brigade which also includes 9th Raiders Wing equipped with modern HH-101A Caesar helicopters. C-130J "Hercules IIs" and C-27J "Spartans" are also available. In the field, the operative force is equipped with the VTLM "Lince", quads and jeeps.

This unit has access to a large arsenal of sniper rifles and anti-materiel rifles to be used to knock out aircraft. It also uses mini UAVs such as the "Strix" produced by Galileo Avionica, and L-3 Communication's "ROVER IV".

The 17th Raiders Wing has a variety of armament and equipment.

=== Pistols ===
- 9x19mm Beretta Px4 Storm Type D
- 9x19mm Glock 17
- 5,7x28mm FN Five-seven

=== Shotguns ===
- Benelli M4

=== Submachine guns and personal defense weapons ===
- Heckler & Koch MP7
- MP-5A3
- MP-5SD3

=== Assault and battle rifles ===
- 5,56x45mm Heckler & Koch 416
- Heckler & Koch G36
- FN SCAR
- ARX-160A2
- 7,62x51mm Heckler & Koch HK417
- IWI Arad

=== Light machine guns ===
- IWI Negev

=== Sniper rifles ===
- 7,62x51mm Sr-25/Mk-11
- 7,62x51mm Sako TRG-22
- 8,6x70mm Sako TRG-42

=== Anti-materiel rifles ===
- 10,4x77mm BCM Europearms Extreme MAAR
- 12,7x99mm Barrett M-82A1
- 12,7x99mm PGM Hécate II

=== Combat accessories ===
- Various Aimpoint, Trijicon and EOTech optical sights
- Schmidt & Bender PM-2
- LAM 100/200 laser pointer
- Insight AN/PEQ-2, AN/PEQ-4 and AN/PEQ-15 (infrared) laser sighting systems
- Mako MEPRO MOR insight system
- Insight Mk23 thermal camera
