= Military history of Italy during World War II =

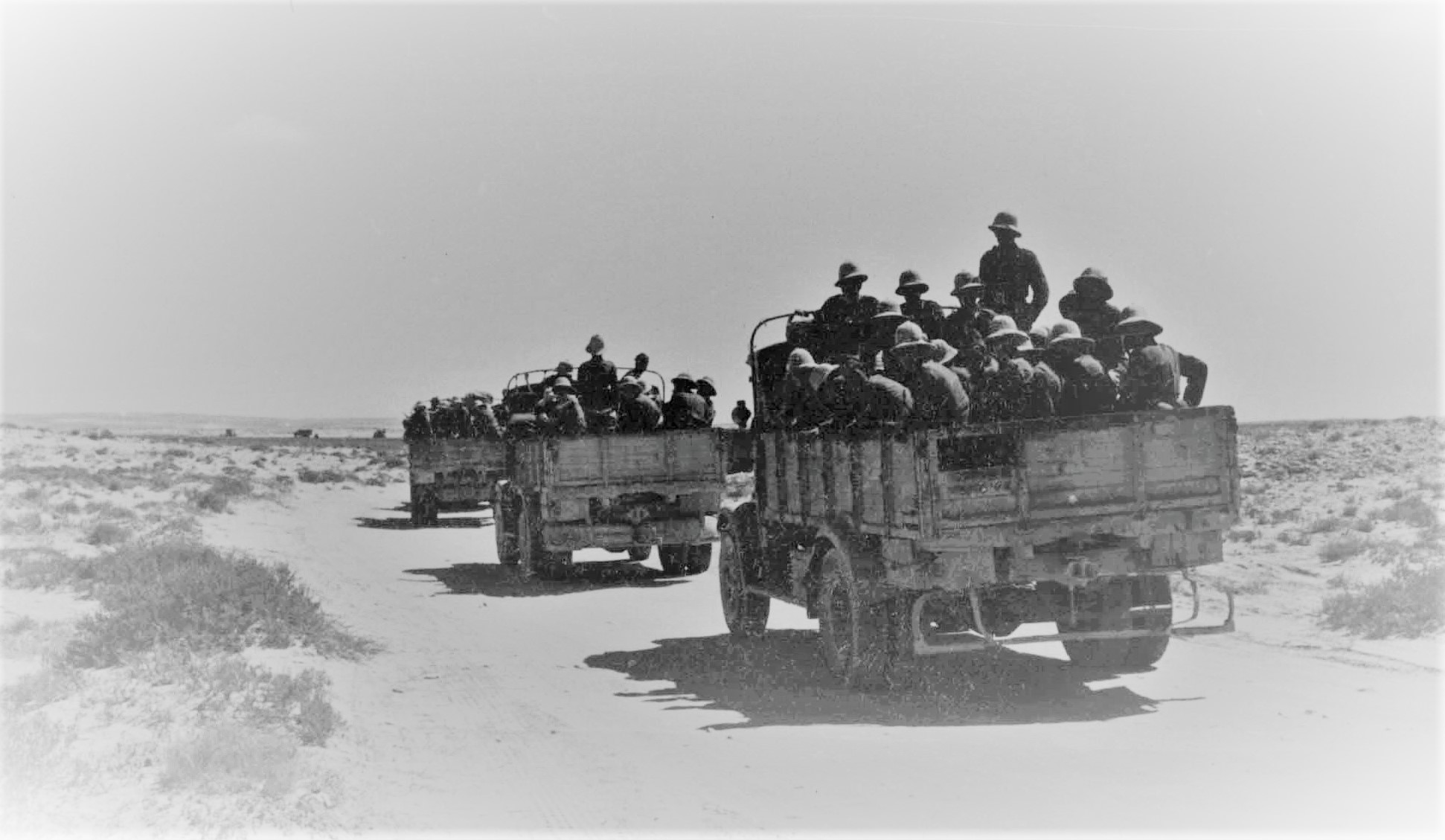
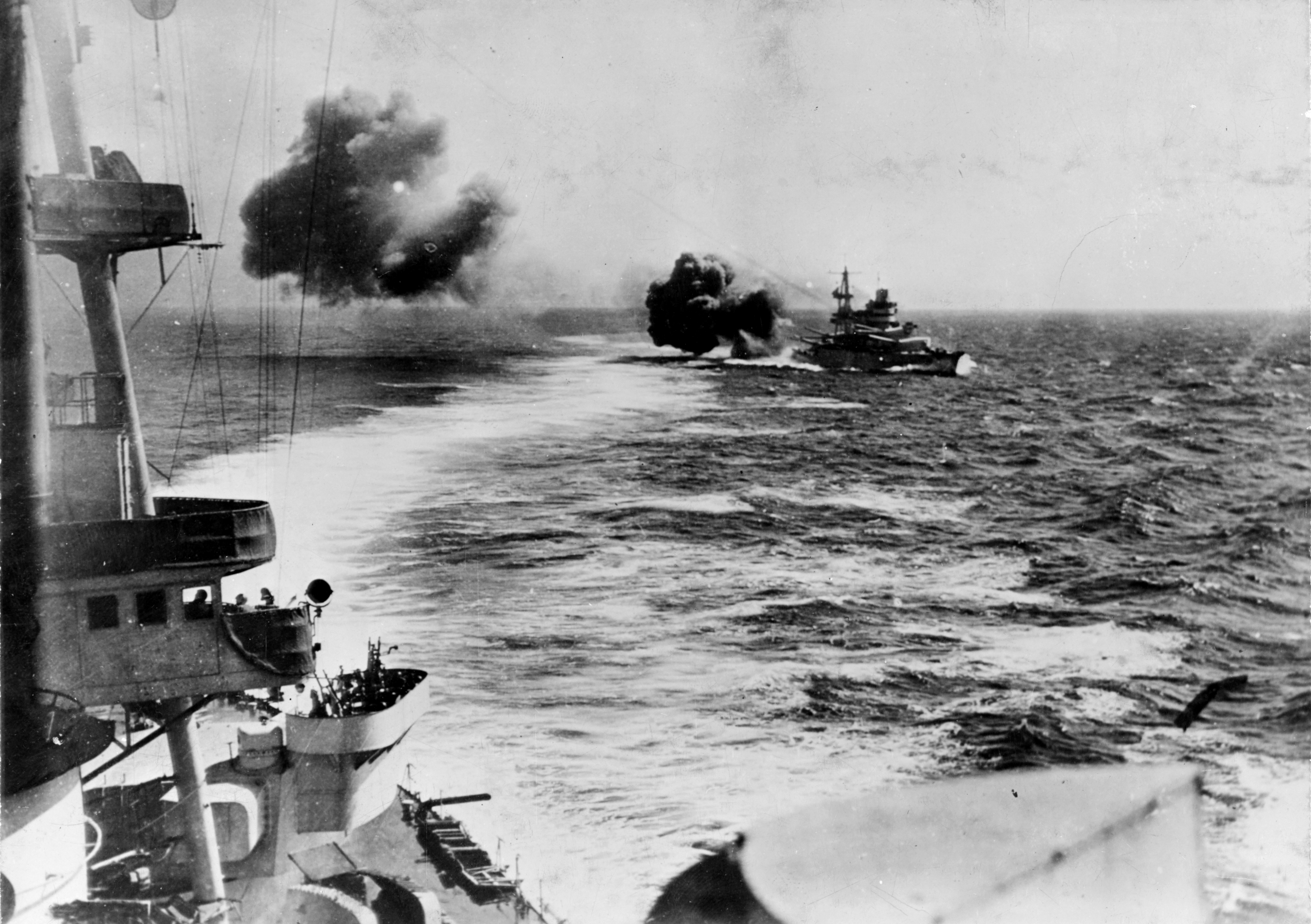
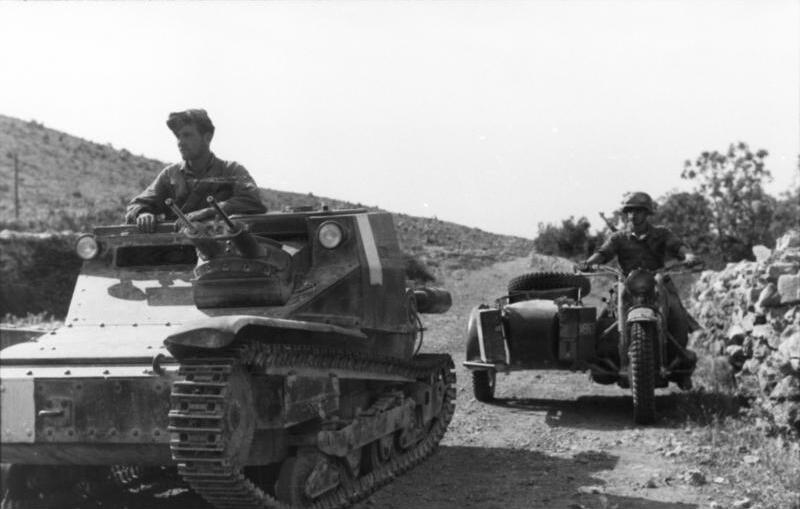
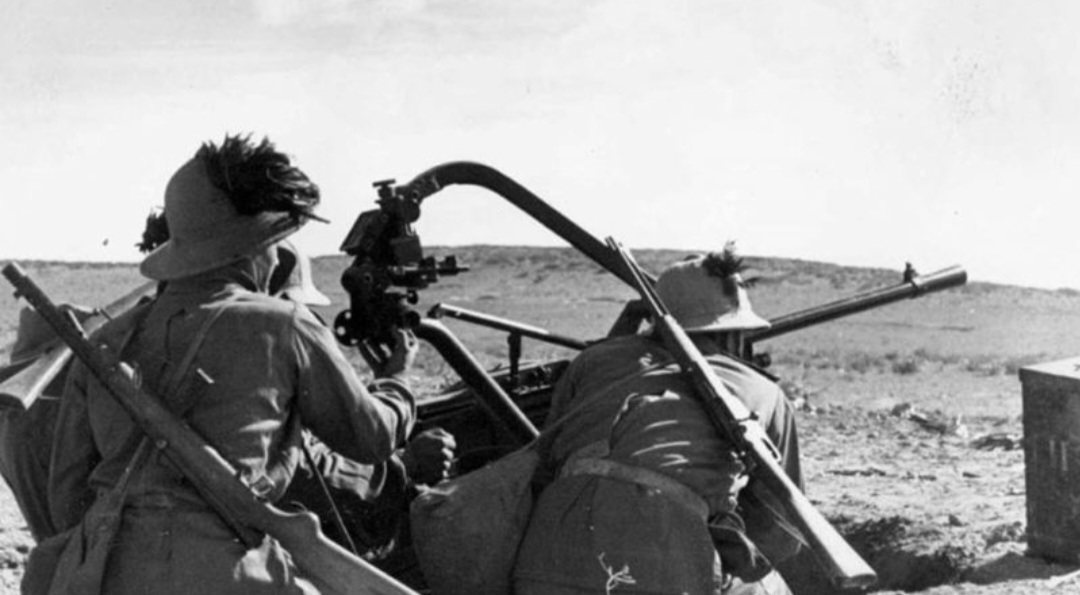
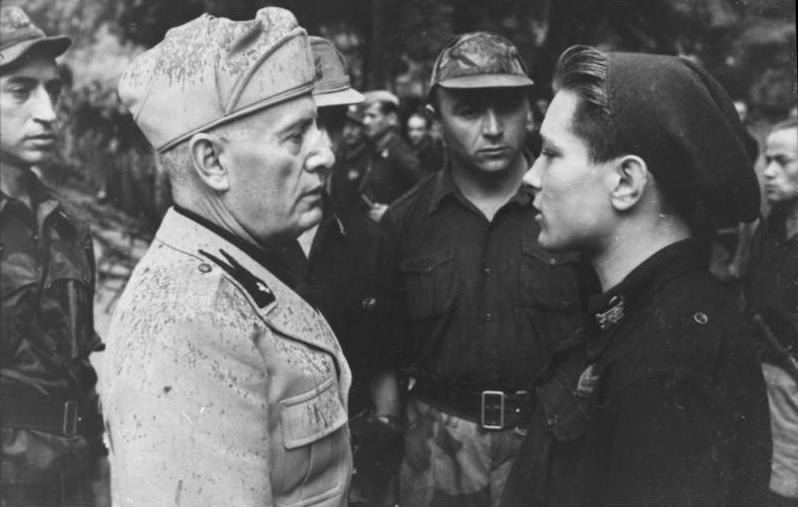
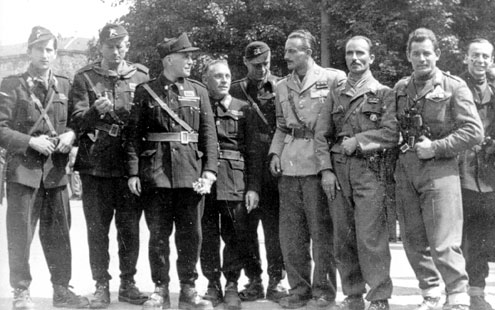
- From top left to bottom right: Army convoy in Libya, 1940; The Conte di Cavour opens fire during the Battle of Calabria, 1940; Italian tankette in Yugoslavia, 1941; AA gun manned by Bersaglieri at El Alamein, 1942; Mussolini inspects Italian Social Republic soldiers, 1944; Partisans in Ossola, 1944
Date	10 June 1940 – 2 May 1945
Location	Balkans, East Africa, Italy, Mediterranean, North Africa, Soviet Union

As one of the major Axis powers, Italy entered World War II on 10 June 1940, joining the Battle of France in its later stages. Italian dictator Benito Mussolini did so opportunistically as the Allied powers (chiefly France and the United Kingdom) seemed on the verge of collapse, and he hoped to make territorial gains through minimal fighting. While France surrendered on 22 June 1940, the United Kingdom and its Commonwealth continued to fight far beyond the point Mussolini had thought possible.

Mussolini took Italy to war unprepared, and the armed forces were sent into battle with insufficient resources (reduced by previous wars in Spain, Ethiopia and Albania) and many untrained personnel. A high proportion of the military's equipment was obsolescent, particularly in 1940-41. Italy's first military action, the invasion of France, resulted in only limited gains. This was followed by the capture of British Somaliland and the advance into western Egypt, in both cases against heavily outnumbered opponents. However, Italy subsequently experienced major defeats in North Africa and Greece between November 1940 and February 1941, requiring German intervention in spring 1941 to help resume the offensive. Greece and Yugoslavia were then overrun and occupied, but this sparked major partisan uprisings.

In 1941, British Commonwealth forces captured Italian East Africa. In North Africa, large swathes of Italian Libya and western Egypt changed hands several times between Allied and Axis forces. The war effort was hampered by Mussolini dispersing Italy's military strength across several fronts, including the German-led invasion of the Soviet Union in June 1941. Between autumn 1942 and spring 1943, the Axis suffered a series of heavy battlefield defeats in North Africa and the Eastern Front. The Allied invasion of Sicily in July 1943 brought the fighting onto Italian soil, leading to Mussolini being deposed. In September 1943, Italy signed the Armistice of Cassibile with the Allies, just as British and American armies invaded the Italian mainland.

Germany was ready for Italy's defection and invaded central and northern Italy; Mussolini was freed by German troops and installed as leader of the Italian Social Republic, a German puppet state. This sparked the Italian resistance movement against the German occupation and a civil war between pro- and anti-fascist factions. In the south, the Kingdom of Italy became an official co-belligerent of the Allies when it declared war on Germany on 13 October 1943.

The Allied advance progressed slowly, in part because of the mountainous terrain. Rome was liberated on 4 June 1944. During the Allied 1945 spring offensive, a general partisan insurrection against the Germans troops occurred on April 25, the date celebrated in Italy as liberation day. Mussolini was captured and killed on 28 April by partisans while attempting to flee. Axis forces in Italy surrendered the following day, with hostilities ending on 2 May 1945. A final peace agreement was reached between Italy and the Allies with the Treaty of Paris of 15 September 1947.

== Background ==
=== Imperial ambitions ===
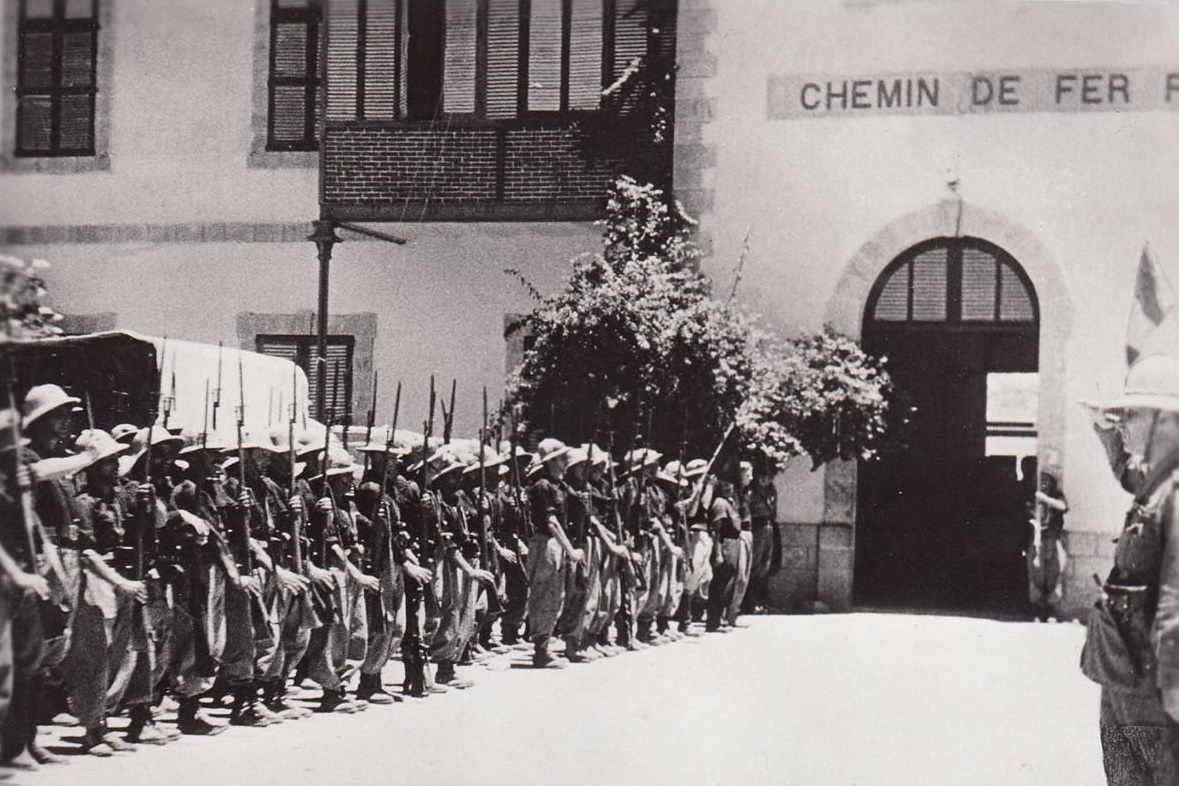
Blackshirt infantry in Ethiopia during the Italian invasion, 1936

In 1922, Italy's liberal democracy gave way to the dictatorship of Benito Mussolini. Although Italy was one of the victor nations in World War I, Mussolini's National Fascist Party felt a sense of grievance towards Britain and France on the issue of territorial gains from the conflict. The Fascists, whose paramilitary arm was known as the Blackshirts, also laid claim to parts of France, such as Alpes-Maritimes, Corsica and Savoie, as well as Malta in the British Commonwealth.

Mussolini had ambitions to build "a new Roman Empire", according to Gooch, that spanned the Mediterranean, Africa and the Balkans. In 1935, Italy invaded Ethiopia, whose army was mostly irregular troops with obsolete weapons. During the Spanish Civil War of 1936-39, Mussolini gave considerable aid, including air and ground forces, to Francisco Franco's Nationalists, seizing on an opportunity to install a right-wing dictatorship and potential ally.

However, the expense of those conflicts eroded the finances of Mussolini's state, leaving it in a weak position to face another world war.

=== Drawing closer to Germany ===
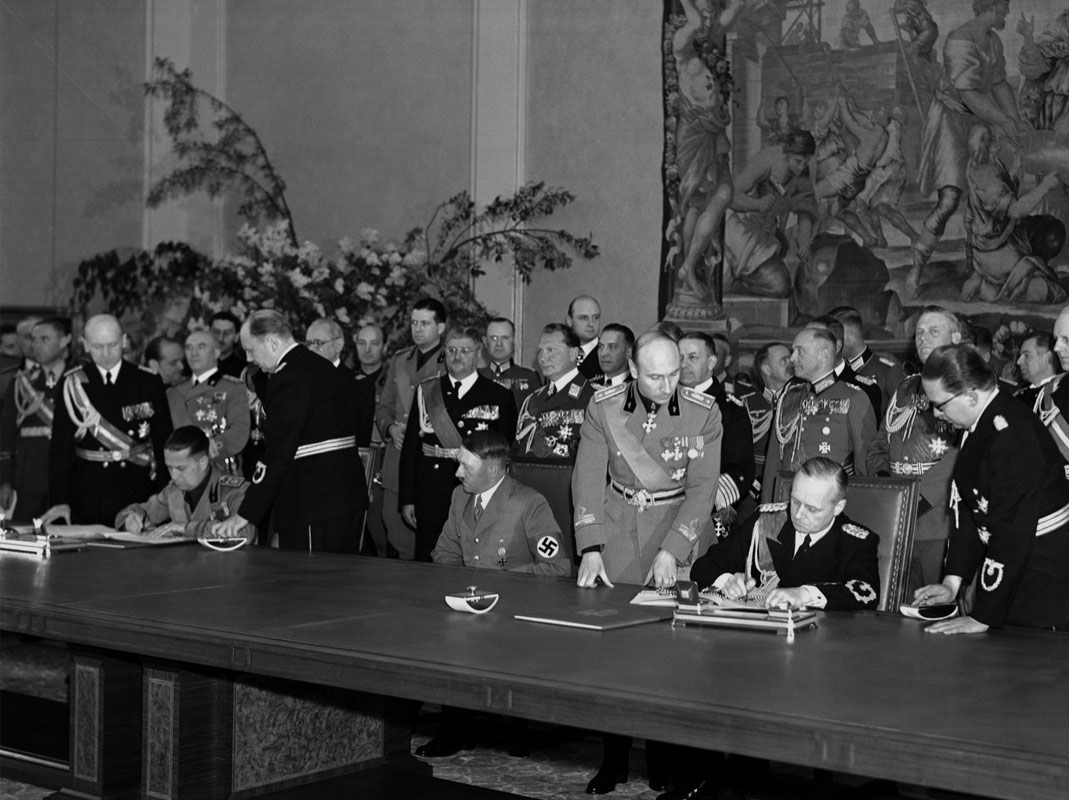
Italy and Germany sign the Pact of Steel, May 1939

The Italo-German protocol of 23 October 1936 saw Germany recognise Italy's conquest of Ethiopia and Mussolini accept Hitler's designs on Austria. The treaty opened a path to closer co-operation.

During the negotiation of the Munich Agreement in September 1938, Mussolini backed Hitler, showing Fascist Italy was siding with the Third Reich. On 7 April 1939, weeks after Hitler broke the Munich Agreement and occupied Bohemia and Moravia, Italian forces invaded Albania.

On 22 May 1939, Italy and Germany signed the Pact of Steel in Berlin, joining both countries in a military alliance designed for a "joint war against France and Britain".

=== Military and Industrial Strength ===
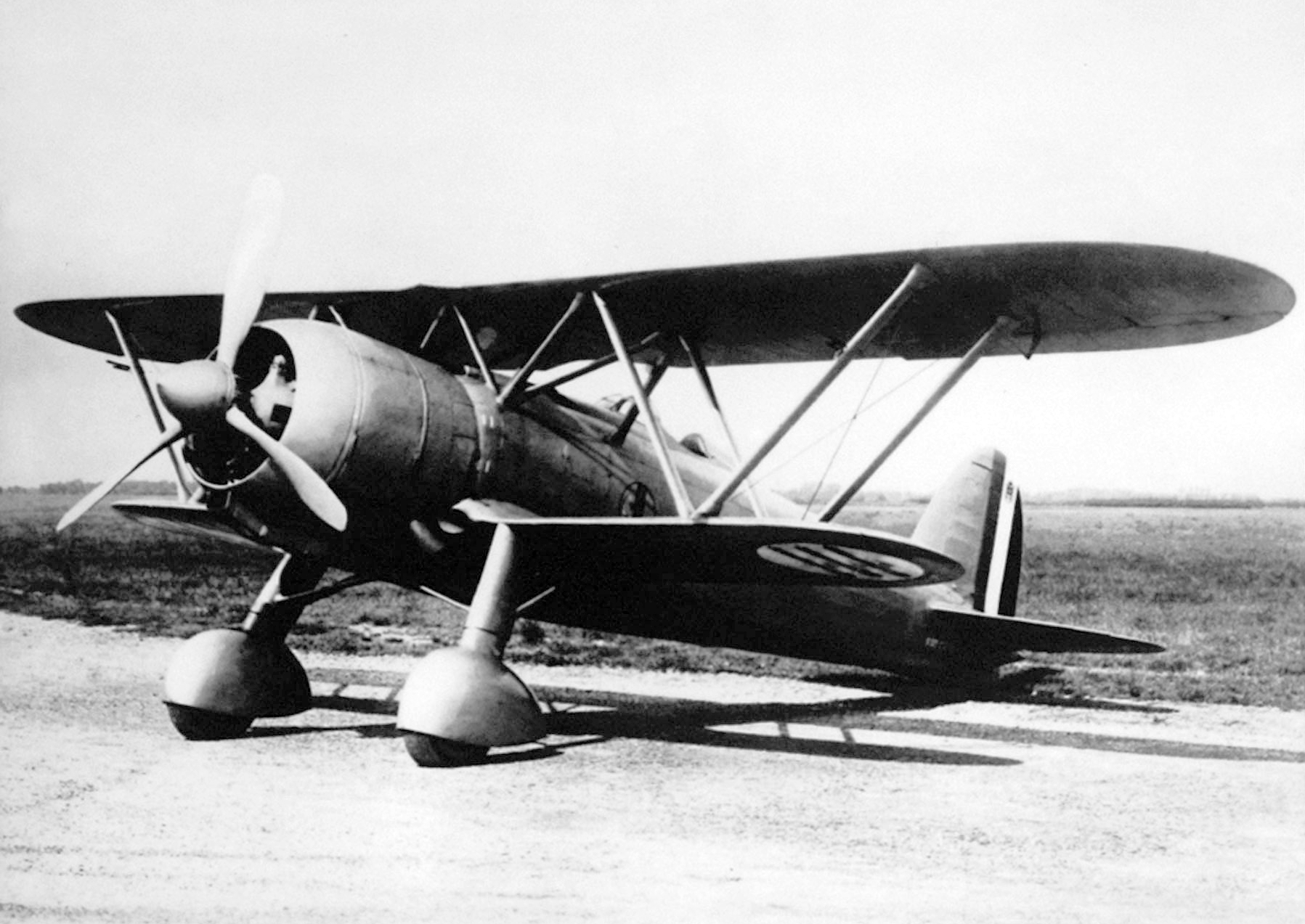
Fiat CR.42 Falco early war Italian fighter

In 1940, Mussolini's military was understrength and of mixed quality compared to other great powers. The Italian Air Force (Regia Aeronautica) at the outbreak of the war had 3,269 aircraft, but 55% were considered to be combat ineffective. Of the 542 fully operational fighters in June 1940, 70% were obsolescent biplanes, such as the Fiat CR.42 Falco. The Italian Royal Navy (Regia Marina) had several modern battleships and heavy cruisers, but no aircraft carriers.

The Italian Royal Army (Regio Esercito) suffered shortages of much of the equipment that had become commonplace in other armies. Some infantry divisions were unmotorised, others were classed as 'auto transportable' but in reality were only partly motorised. Because it had been assumed the army would often fight in mountainous regions, many tanks were small in order to traverse narrow bridges. The bulk of the army's equipment was obsolescent and a re-organisation in 1938 had cut the number of regiments in an infantry division leaving them weakened. Across the services, training was neglected and many personnel had to learn their skills while in the frontline.

Compared to the other great powers, Italy had a less industrialised and more agrarian economy. Italy and Great Britain had similar sized populations in 1940 – 43.8 million for Italy, 47.5 million for Britain. However, in that year British industry manufactured 15,000 aircraft, 1,400 armoured fighting vehicles (AFVs) and 13 million tonnes of steel; compared to 2,100 aircraft, 250 AFVs and 2.1 million tonnes of steel for Italy. Many essential commodities had to be imported, and Italy relied heavily on Germany for coal and Romania for oil. Around 27% of the country's merchant ships were in Allied ports when Mussolini declared war in June 1940, and were immediately impounded.

== Outbreak of the Second World War ==
=== Non-belligerent status ===
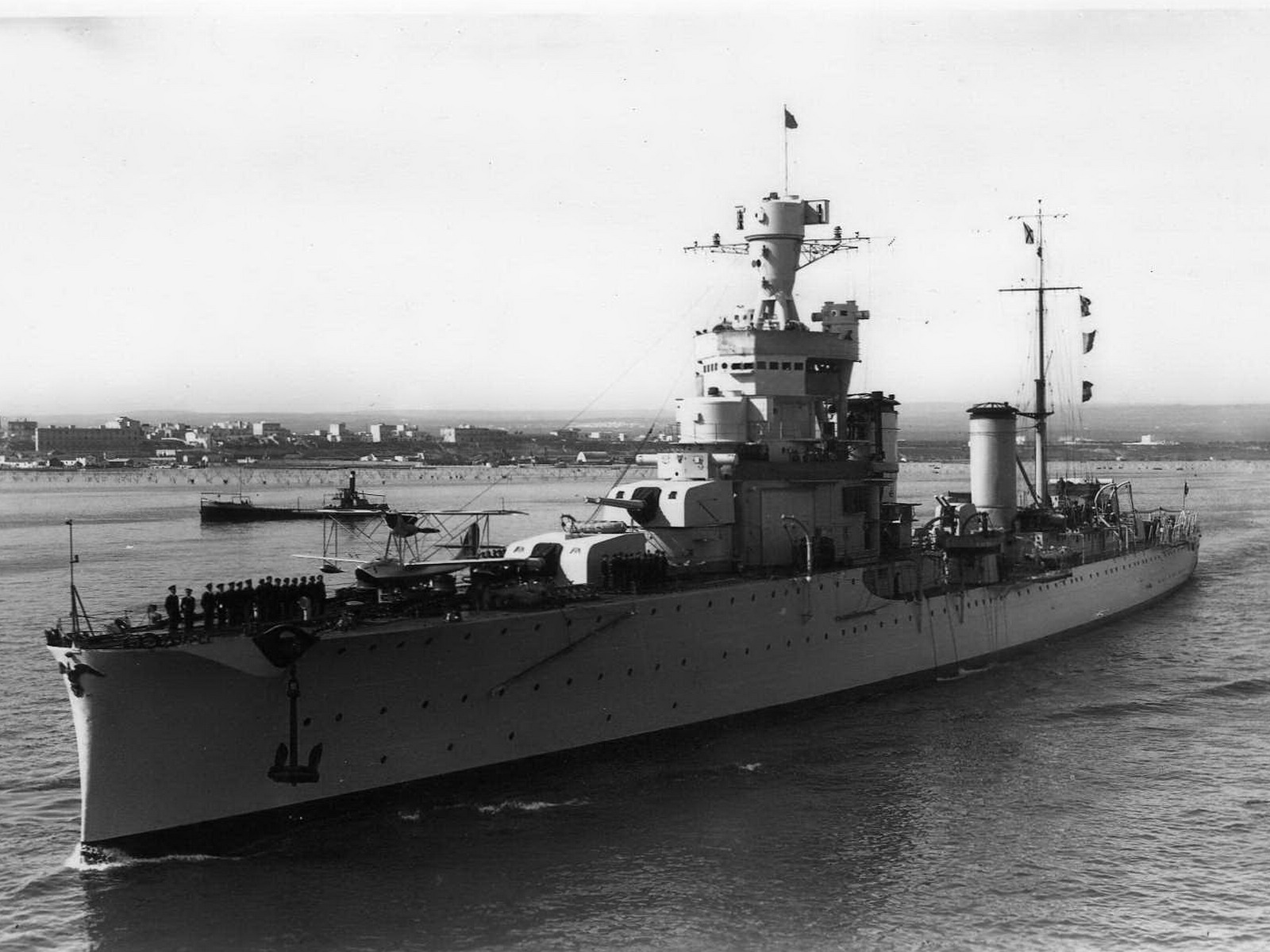
The Regia Marina cruiser Alberto di Giussano

Nazi Germany's invasion of Poland on 1 September 1939 marked the beginning of World War II. However, Italy initially declared itself a non-belligerent, as it was not ready for war and needed time for further re-arming. In December 1939, the Under-Secretary for War Production, Carlo Favagrossa, submitted estimates to Mussolini that suggested the armed forces might not be fully equipped and ready for a major war until 1945.

Mussolini, while accepting Italy needed more time to re-arm, was dissatisfied with the country's non-belligerent status and wanted a way into the war. On 2 September 1939, Count Ciano, the Italian foreign minister and Mussolini's son-in-law, wrote in his diary: "The Duce is convinced of the need to remain neutral, but he is not at all happy. Whenever he can he reverts to the possibility of our action."

=== Italy enters the war ===
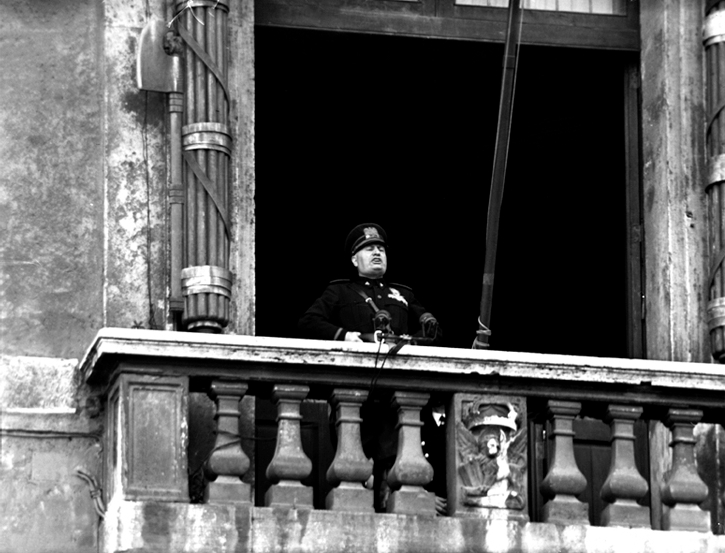
Mussolini delivering his declaration of war speech, from the balcony of the Palazzo Venezia in Rome

The exact timing of Italy's entry into the war was greatly influenced by political opportunism, coming at a time when Britain and France were in full retreat during the Battle of France. Mussolini wanted a seat at the peace conference table to make territorial gains, and told the heads of the armed forces on 29 May 1940, he feared if Italy entered the war after Anglo-French resistance had collapsed, the Germans would take the view that Italy had only joined in "when the job was done", and thus would be reluctant to share the spoils with the Italians. The deteriorating situation for the Allies in late May and early June persuaded Mussolini to join the conflict, even though the military were not ready.

On 10 June 1940, as the French government fled Paris for Bordeaux, Mussolini declared war on Britain and France. The Duce famously told the Chief of the Military General Staff, Marshal Badoglio, "I only need a few thousand dead so that I can sit at the peace conference as a man who has fought".

=== Invasion of France and the occupation ===
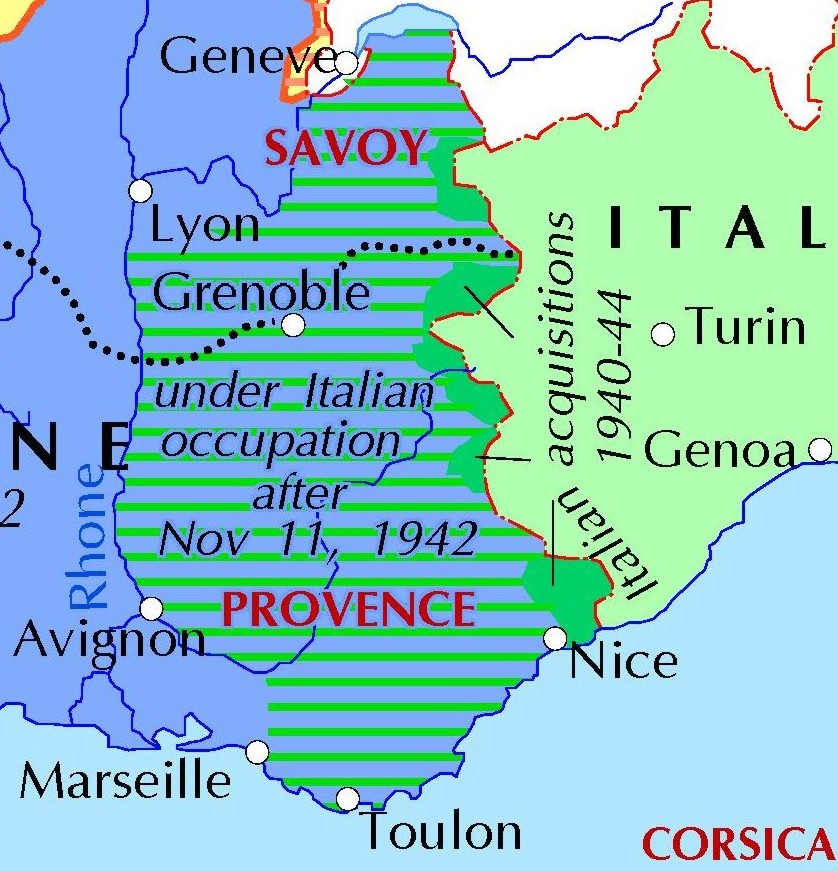
Italian occupation of France (1940–1943)

Despite the 10 June 1940 declaration of war, the Italian offensive into southern France only began on 21 June, and quickly stalled, having encountered stronger-than-expected resistance. Italian casualties totalled just over 6,000 (a third of whom were troops hospitalised with frostbite), compared to less than 500 casualties for the French. Italy gained just a small occupation zone. According to historian John Keegan, "Italy played an ignominious and Johnny-come-lately part" in the Battle of France.

The Italian Navy established an Atlantic submarine base, BETASOM, at Bordeaux in the German occupation zone, and a total of 32 submarines operated from there between October 1940 and September 1943 – compared to the 863 German U-boats that fought in the Battle of the Atlantic. Initially, BETASOM got off to a disappointing start, but their combat record steadily improved, and the fleet went on to sink an estimated 571,815 Gross Register Tonnage of Allied shipping.

In November 1942, the Italian army occupied south-eastern Vichy France and Corsica as part of Case Anton.

== North Africa ==
=== Invasion of Egypt and Operation Compass ===
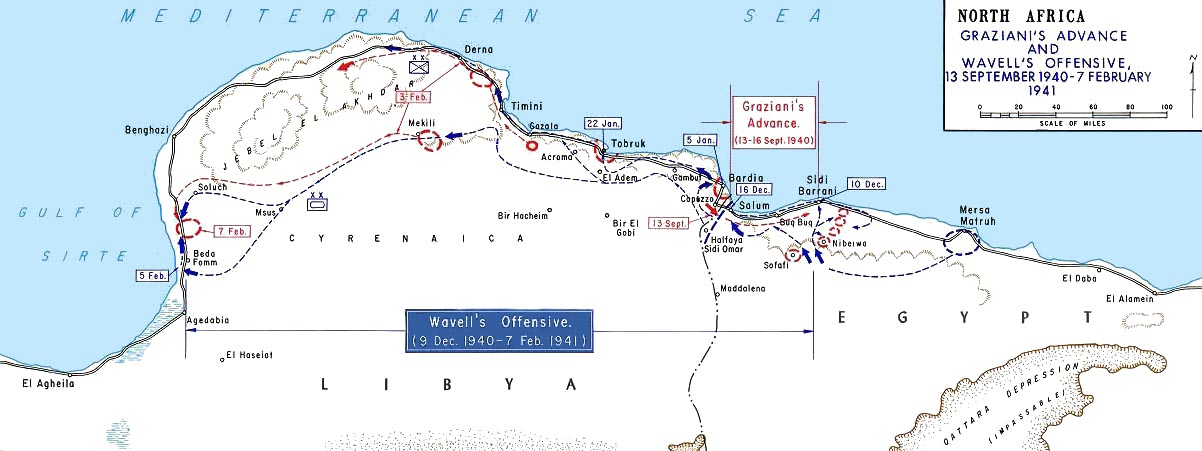
The Italian invasion and British counter-offensive

Within a week of Italy's declaration of war on 10 June 1940, the British 11th Hussars had seized Fort Capuzzo in Libya. On 28 June, Marshal Italo Balbo, the Governor-General of Libya, was killed by friendly fire. Mussolini ordered Balbo's replacement, General Rodolfo Graziani, to launch an attack into Egypt. Graziani reported that his forces were not properly equipped, but Mussolini still ordered him to proceed. On 13 September, elements of the 10th Army retook Fort Capuzzo and crossed the border into Egypt. Lightly opposed, they advanced 80 km (50 miles) to Sidi Barrani, then halted and built a series of fortified camps.

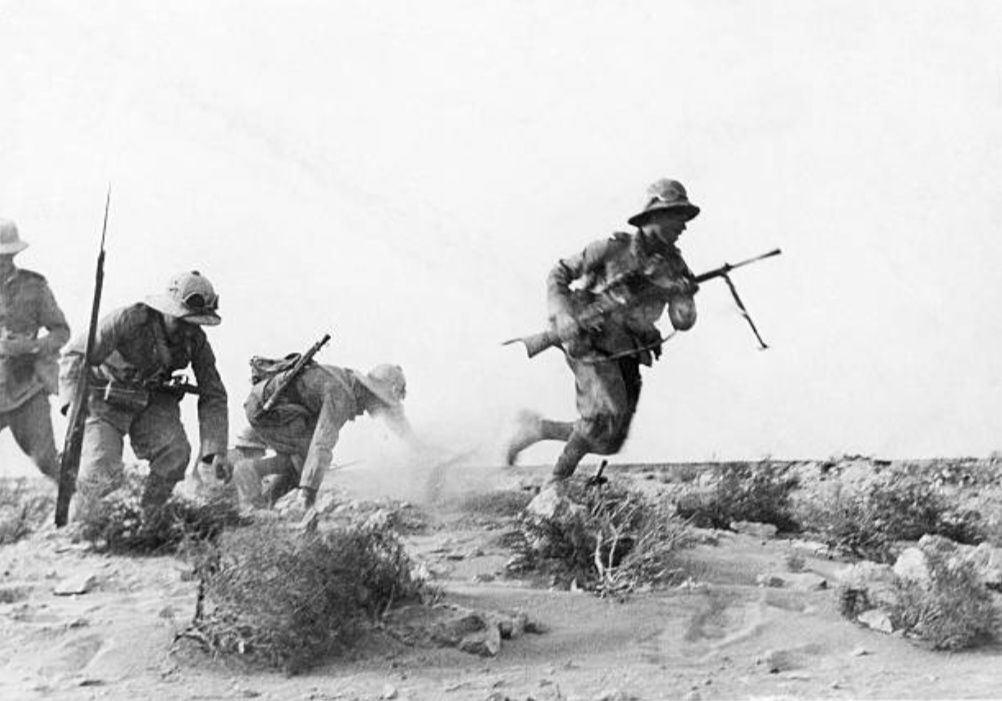
Italian infantry in action in North Africa

The Italians had 200,000 soldiers in Libya, while the British had 63,000 in Egypt. However, neither side could commit their full strength to the front at Sidi Barrani. Libya had only been pacified in 1932, so garrisons were needed around the country to prevent uprisings, plus guard the border with Vichy French Tunisia. The British had to consider the other Italian threat in East Africa, plus internal security in Egypt and Palestine. Graziani committed four infantry divisions (two Italian, two Libyan) and a mobile group (which included tanks) to the Egyptian invasion. Two more Italian infantry divisions followed later. They were opposed by Western Desert Force, commanded by General Richard O'Connor, consisting of two British Commonwealth divisions – one armoured and one infantry – totalling 36,000 men. This force was fully mechanised and contained heavily armoured Matilda II tanks.

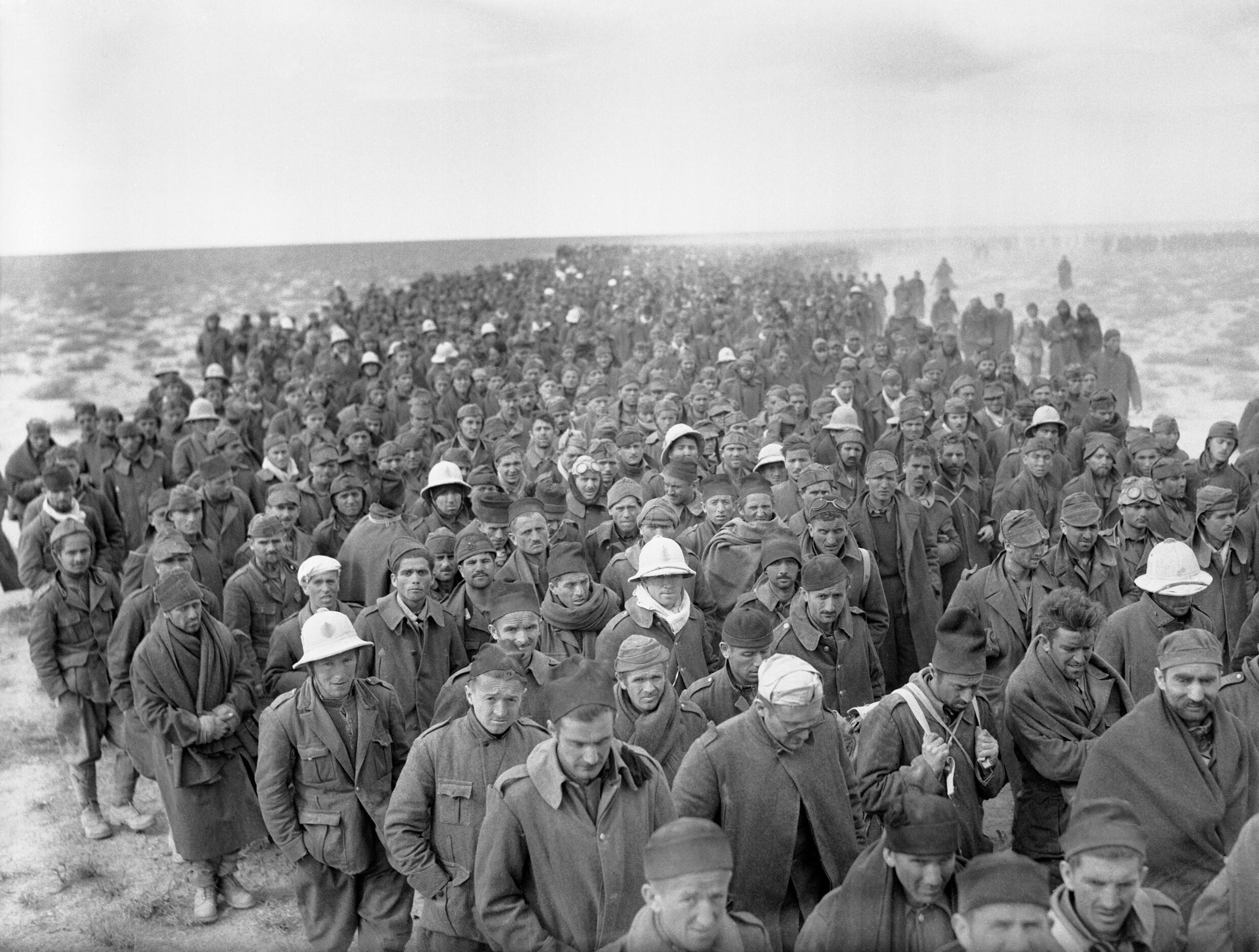
Italian soldiers taken prisoner during Operation Compass

With the invasion at a halt, the Commander-in-Chief of British Middle East Command, General Wavell, ordered O'Connor to plan an attack that took "every advantage of the element of surprise". On 8 December 1940, Operation Compass began, which saw Western Desert Force overrun the forts at Sidi Barrani, sending the Italians into a full retreat. The Italian anti-tank guns were ineffective against the Matilda II tanks, which inflicted heavy losses. The British reached Beda Fomm on 6 February 1941, enveloping 10th Army, which surrendered the following day. The British took 130,000 prisoners, including 22 generals and an admiral.

Western Desert Force pushed on to El Agheila. O'Connor wanted to take the rest of Libya, but with his troops exhausted, supply lines stretched and British attention now shifting towards Greece, Wavell ordered a halt.

=== Operation Sonnenblume, Tobruk and Operation Crusader ===
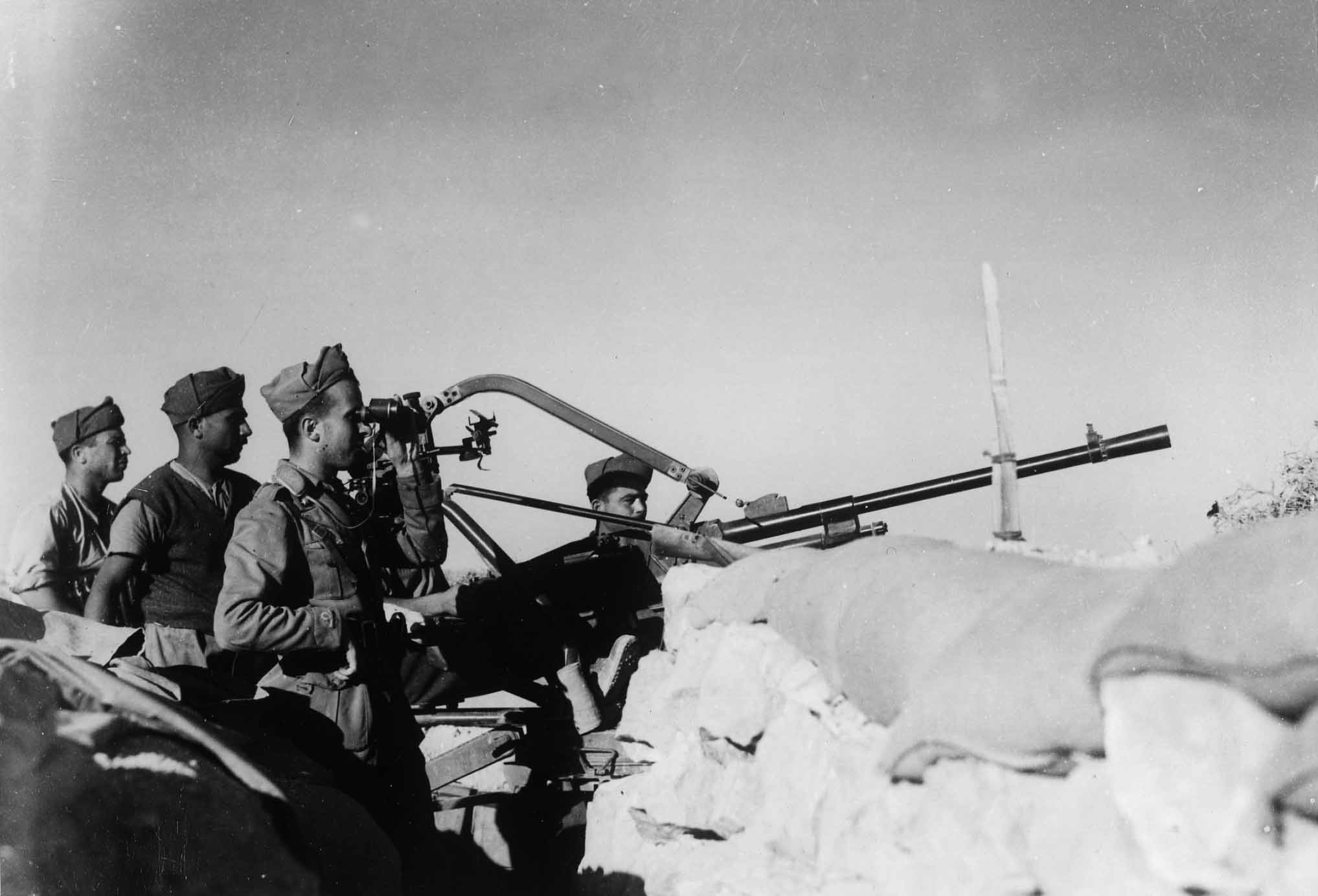
Breda 20/65 mod.35 AA gun near Tobruk, 1941

The very day that Wavell ordered British Commonwealth forces in Libya switch to the defensive at El Agheila, the German General Erwin Rommel arrived in Tripoli. The Axis had begun rebuilding its forces in North Africa by sending the German Afrika Korps or DAK, plus six Italian divisions. The new arrivals included the motorised Trieste and armoured Ariete divisions, which improved the mobility and offensive power of the Italians. While in theory Rommel, as commander of the DAK divisions, reported to the Italian Governor of Libya, in practice he would steadily dominate field command and strategy for both German and Italian forces.

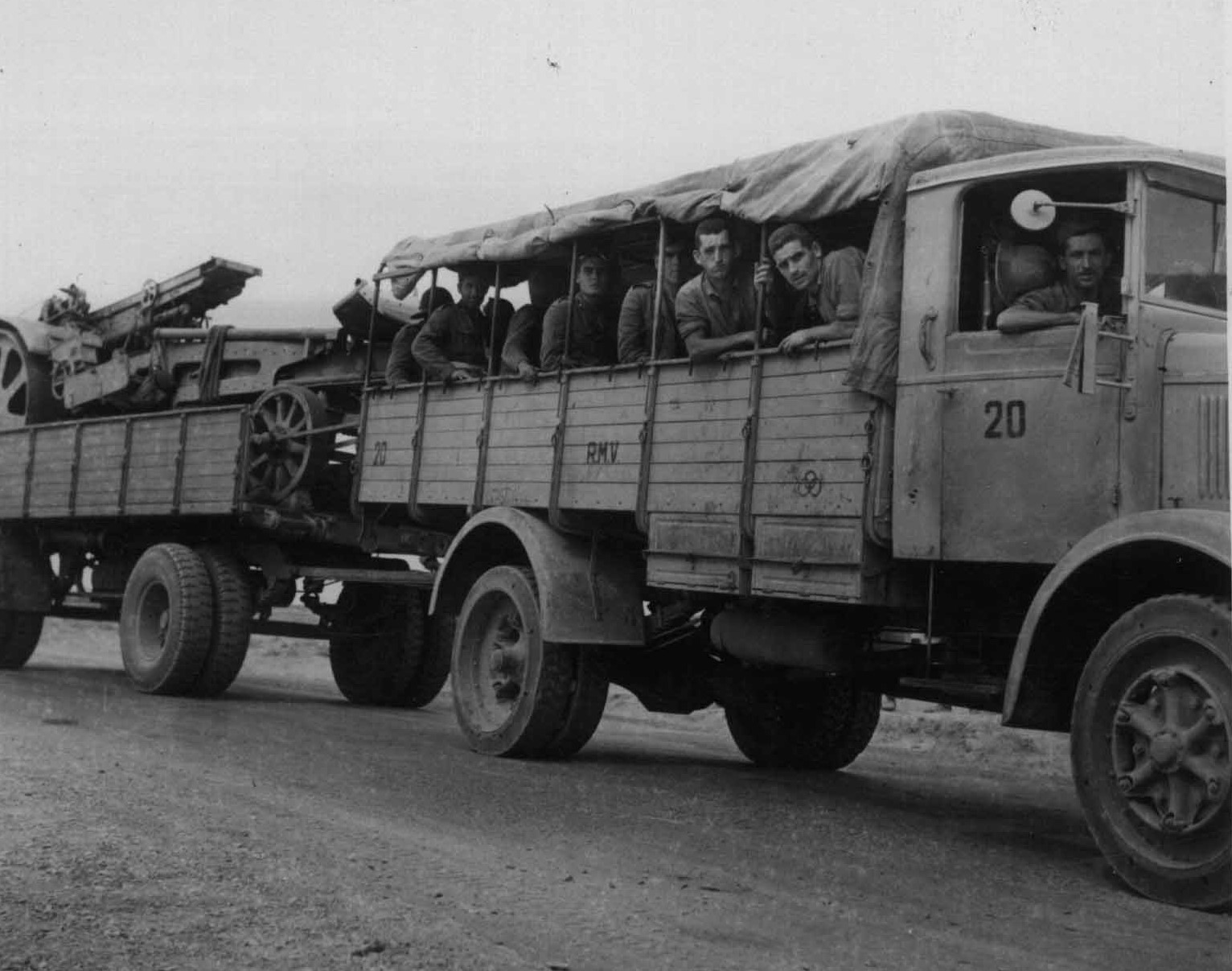
Italian troops and arms on their way to Tobruk, 1941

Most of the troops in the Axis army in Libya were Italian, although the DAK panzer divisions were a potent addition to this force, thanks to their modern tanks, well-developed tactics and powerful 88mm anti-tank/anti-aircraft guns. On 24 March, Rommel launched a counter-offensive, Operation Sonnenblume, with German and Italian forces (including the Ariete division) fighting in mixed formations. The bulk of the British Commonwealth army was quickly pushed back into Egypt, with 3,000 troops taken prisoner. The British garrison at the key port of Tobruk was cut off and besieged.

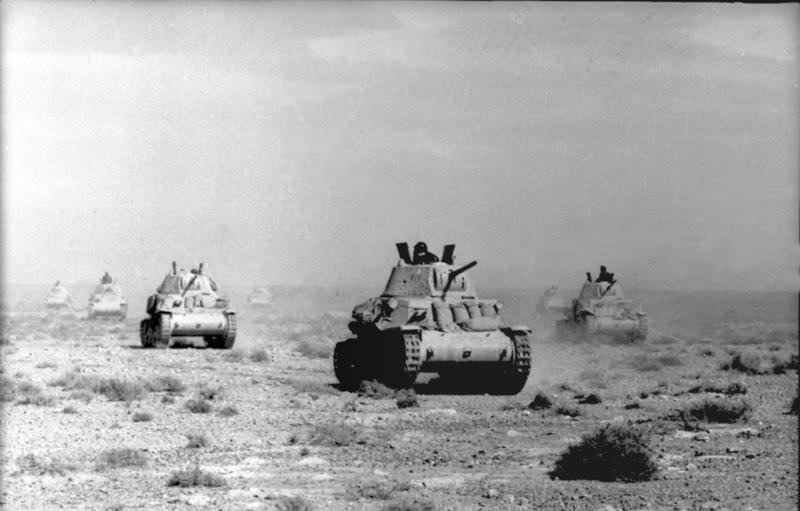
M13/40 tanks in North Africa

The failure to take the Allied enclave at Tobruk left the Axis army's supply lines over-extended and vulnerable, forcing a halt to the advance. Italian and German forces then repelled two British Commonwealth offensives to break through to Tobruk – Operation Brevity and Operation Battleaxe.

British Eighth Army launched Operation Crusader in November 1941 to relieve Tobruk. It was a close-run battle, in part because the Italian divisions performed better than they had the previous year. The Ariete armoured division fought well, notably with its defeat of an attack by the British 22nd Armoured Brigade on Bir el Gubi on 19 November 1941; which was one of a number of setbacks for the British during the opening phase of the battle.

Despite heavy losses and several reverses, the British stayed resolute and continued to press home their attack, wearing down the Axis forces. The Battalion Group Giovani Fascisti, reinforced by German tanks, repelled another British attack on Bir el Gubi on 4 to 6 December, but this spirited defence made no difference to the outcome of the wider battle, with Rommel ordering a general retreat on 6 December. Operation Crusader ended with a major Allied victory, with Tobruk relieved and the Axis frontline pushed back once more to El Agheila by the end of the year – reversing all Rommel's gains in 1941.

=== Gazala, El Alamein and Tunisia ===
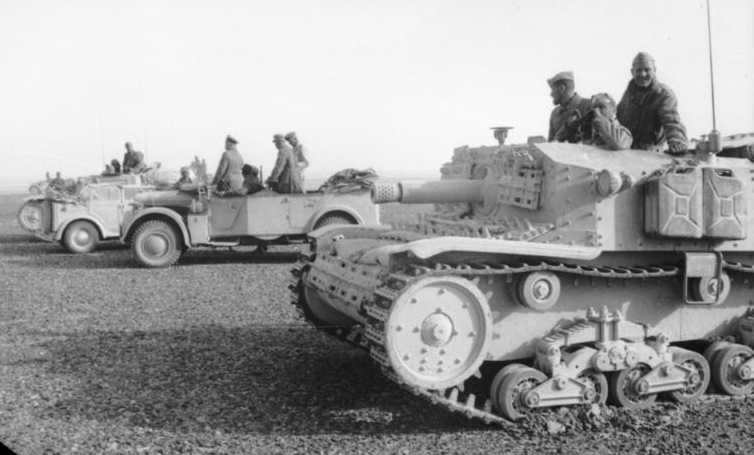
Italian Semovente da 75/18 assault gun in North Africa

In the aftermath of Operation Crusader, the Italians reinforced their army in Libya, with the arrival of the Littorio armoured division. Based on lessons learnt in 1941, the armoured divisions were re-organised and re-equipped, adding more artillery and anti-tank guns. They also received two weapons, albeit in small numbers, that would increase their effectiveness against Allied armour. These were the Cannone da 90/53, a powerful anti-tank/anti-aircraft gun, and the Semovente da 75/18 assault gun which with its 75mm gun proved to be an effective tank destroyer.

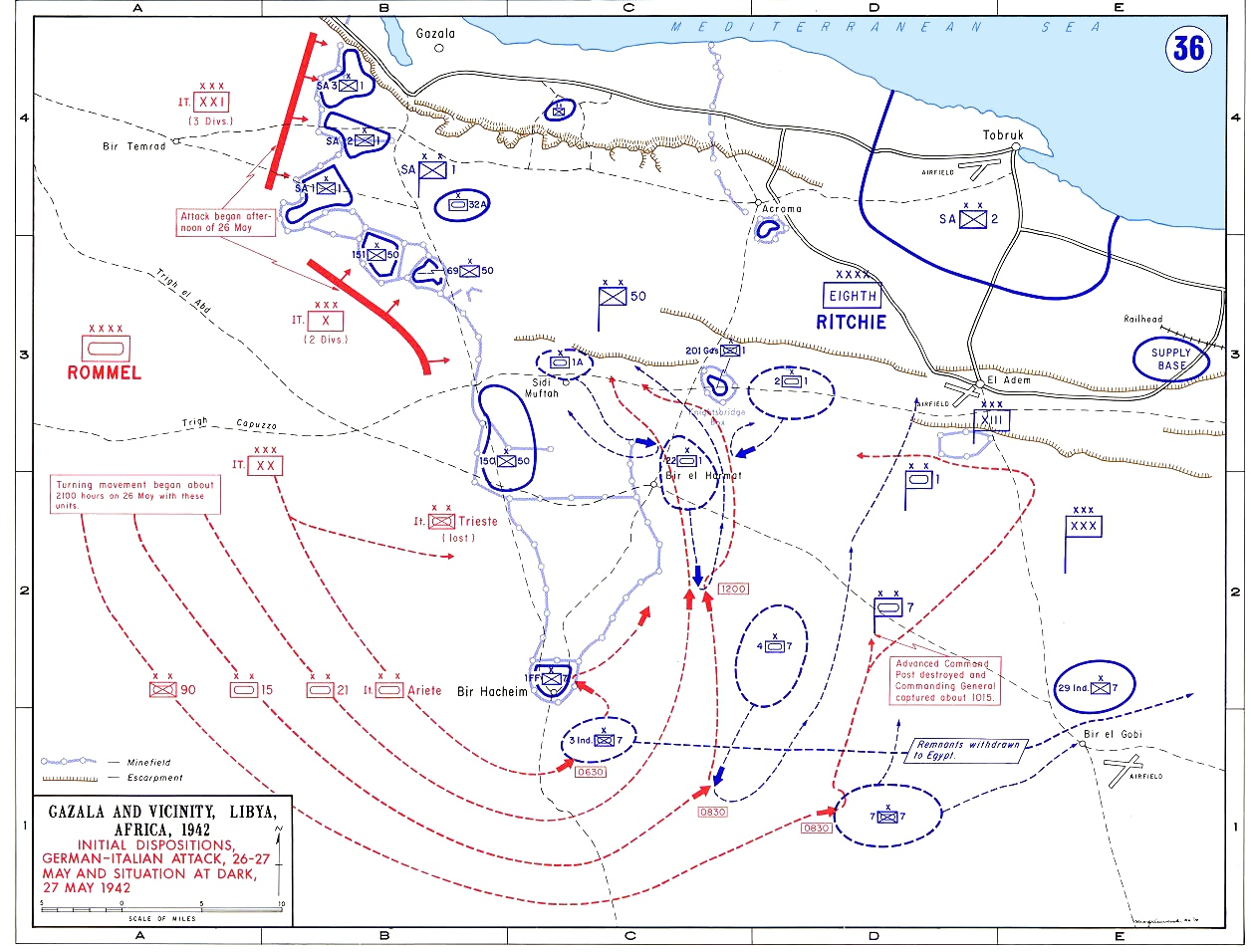
Battle of Gazala: Opening phase advances by the Axis forces, 26–27 May 1942

In January 1942, Axis forces advanced to Gazala where the front line stabilised. The British established a number of fortified positions, known as 'boxes', but some were placed too far apart to support each other. On 26 May 1942, the Battle of Gazala began with Italian infantry divisions assaulting the British boxes to the north as a diversion, while the DAK divisions and the armoured Ariete and motorised Trieste divisions performed a wide flanking movement to the south; during which Ariete destroyed the 3rd Indian Motor Brigade. Having flanked the British boxes, DAK plus Ariete established a defensive position deep behind the Allied lines, known as 'The Cauldron', where Ariete helped repel British attacks, until a link up with the Italian infantry occurred. Rommel then launched an attack from the Cauldron towards the coast, which forced the British to evacuate their boxes to avoid encirclement. Tobruk fell to the Axis on 21 June.

However, at the First Battle of El Alamein, in Egypt, the Allies halted the Axis advance towards Alexandria. During the battle the Italians suffered heavy losses, and some units were demonstrating signs of fatigue. Also, extended supply lines caused the army to suffer shortages of food, ammunition and fuel.

The Axis forces made a final attempt to break through during the Battle of Alam el Halfa, but the Eighth Army held firm. The battle saw the Axis field 447 medium tanks (244 were Italian) against 700 British tanks – Axis intelligence had wrongly estimated the two sides were at parity in tank numbers. Also, the British had seen a change of command, with Sir Harold Alexander now C-in-C Middle East and Bernard Montgomery as Eighth Army commander. Most of the losses in the battle for the Italians were taken by XX Corps, which was the most mechanized Italian Corps in Egypt.

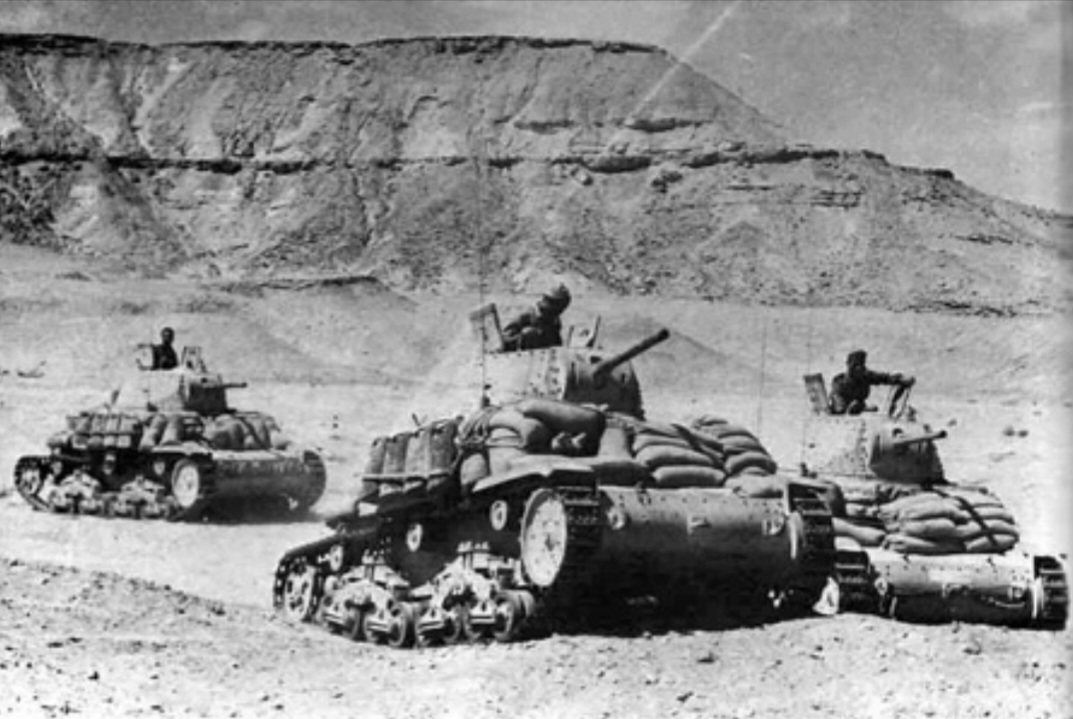
Italian M13/40 tanks at El Alamein

Lacking the fuel, troops and equipment to launch another attack, Rommel began fortifying his line ready for the expected Allied offensive. Meanwhile, Montgomery built up overwhelming superiority in numbers, with Eighth Army troops receiving training and new weapons, including over 250 M4 Sherman tanks. The Second Battle of El Alamein began on 23 October 1942 with a heavy Allied bombardment, initiating a battle of attrition which would see Axis forces gradually eroded.

On 4 November, with his frontline collapsing, Rommel ordered a retreat, just as most of the Ariete and Littorio armoured divisions, and the Trieste Motorised infantry division, after heavy fighting, were encircled and destroyed. The Bologna and Trento infantry divisions were overrun on 4 November as they tried to disengage from the attackers – with Trento fighting until it ran out of ammunition. On 6 November, the Folgore division of Italian paratroopers, having fought with tenacity at El Alamein, was destroyed during the retreat. The remnants of Rommel's forces conducted a fighting retreat to Tunisia.

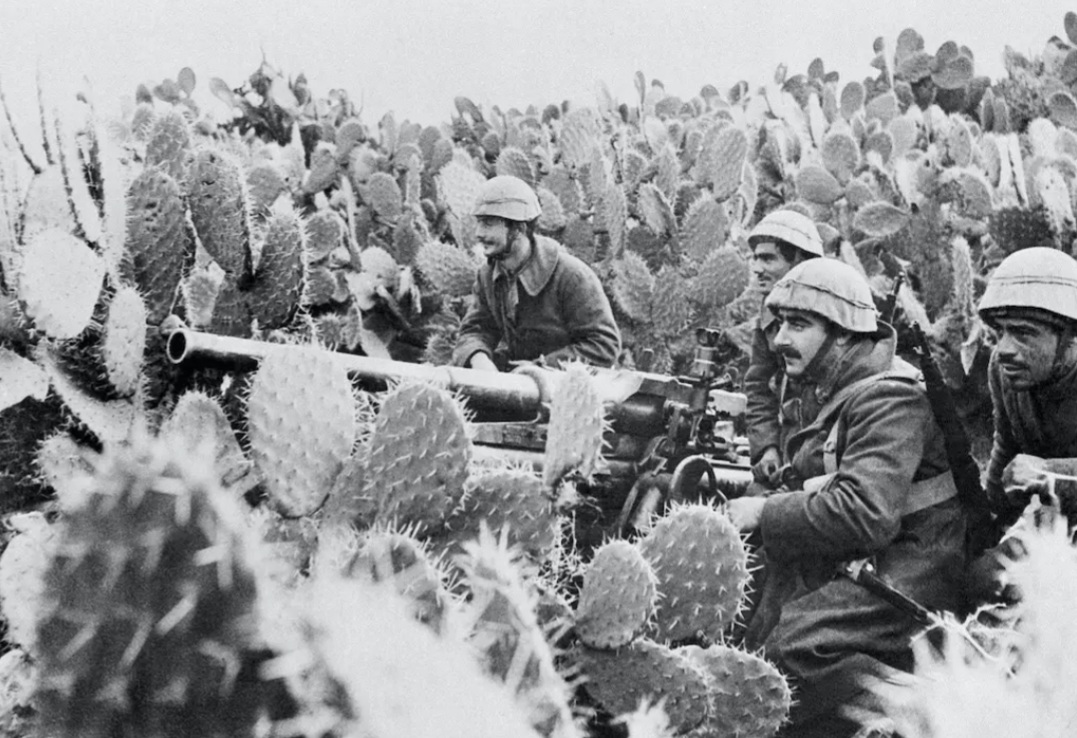
Italian troops in a cactus field in Tunisia, 1943

After the Operation Torch landings in the Vichy French territories of Morocco and Algeria in November 1942, the German-Italian forces in Tunisia faced Allied troops to the west, raising the prospect of being pincered when Montgomery’s army arrived at the Mareth Line. By February 1943, the Axis army in Tunisia were joined by Rommel's forces, which were re-designated the Italian First Army (under Giovanni Messe) when Rommel left to command the Axis forces to the north at the Battle of the Kasserine Pass. During that battle, the Centauro armoured division, according to Walker, “was instrumental in breaking through the US positions and in opening up the road to Thala and Tebessa”.

In late March 1943, Messe’s army, at the end of the Battle of the Mareth Line, had to retreat having been flanked. In Rome, doubt grew on the wisdom of committing further resources to Tunisia which soon would be needed to confront an Allied invasion of Italy itself. Messe and First Army surrendered on Mussolini’s orders on 13 May bringing to an end the North African campaign.

== East Africa ==
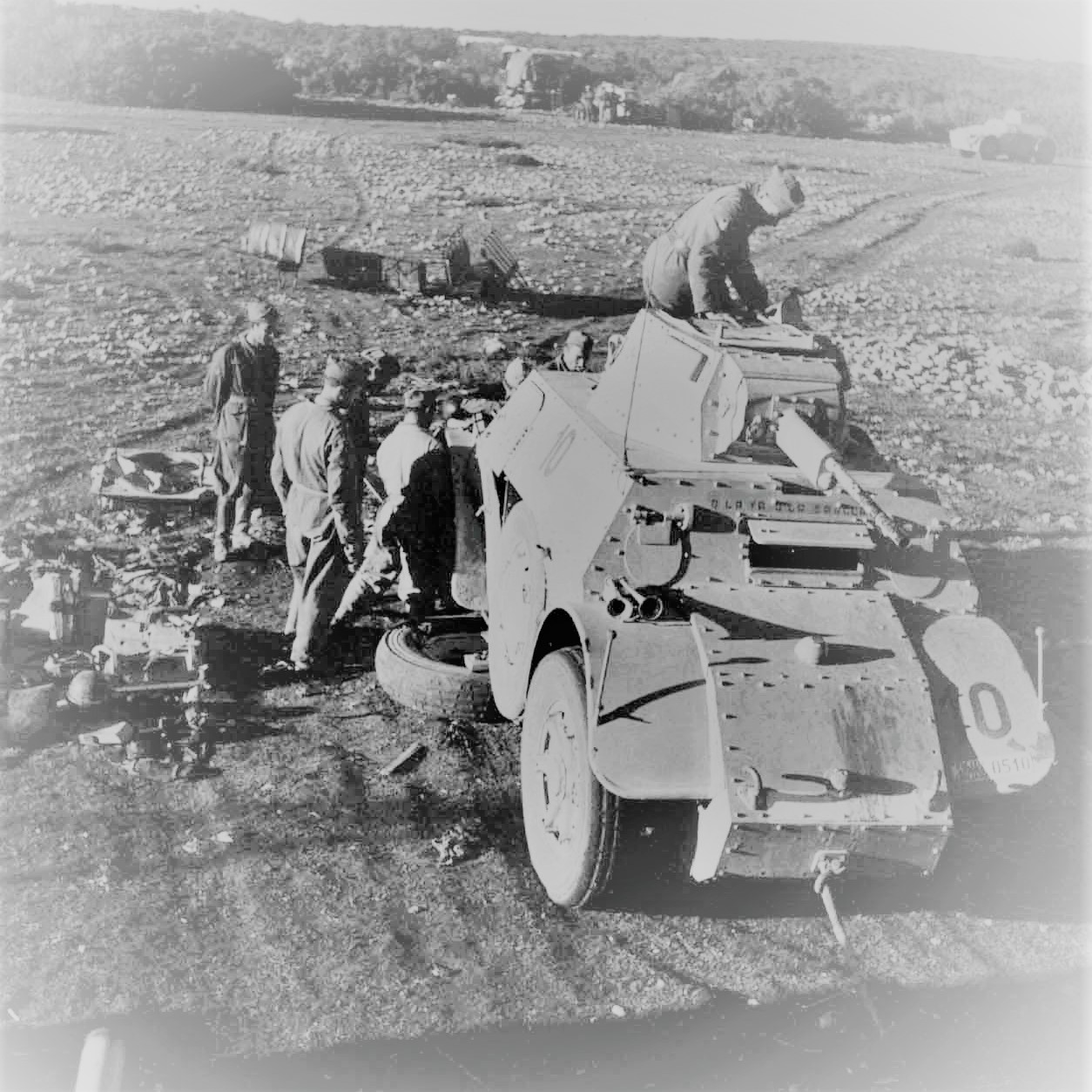
Italian troops in East Africa repairing an Autoblindo

When Italy declared war in June 1940, Mussolini’s forces in Italian East Africa (nearly 256,000 soldiers, plus a further 24,000 irregulars) outnumbered the Allies in the region. However, with the outbreak of war, Italy’s colony was immediately cut off, precluding any reinforcement, and was surrounded by British and French colonies. Many of Italy's colonial units were poorly organised, short of officers and NCOs, lacked heavy weapons and were widely dispersed.

The Viceroy of Italian East Africa, and the military commander, Prince Amedeo, Duke of Aosta, has been described as, "amateurish and unimaginative". Nor were the British Commonwealth the only threat, as the Italians faced a native insurgency in Ethiopia.

The Regia Marina operated a small Red Sea Flotilla, consisting of seven destroyers and eight submarines, which was based at the port of Massawa in Eritrea. The flotilla carried out sorties against British convoys traversing the Red Sea, although shortages of fuel and ammunition limited its effectiveness.

In July 1940, Italian forces launched limited offensives that took several border towns in Kenya and Sudan, in some cases facing resistance from detachments of British colonial troops and local police, as occurred at the Battle of Kassala. In August, the Italians launched a more ambitious offensive, invading British Somaliland. After initial resistance, the outnumbered British garrison was evacuated by sea to Aden leaving Italy in full possession of the colony.

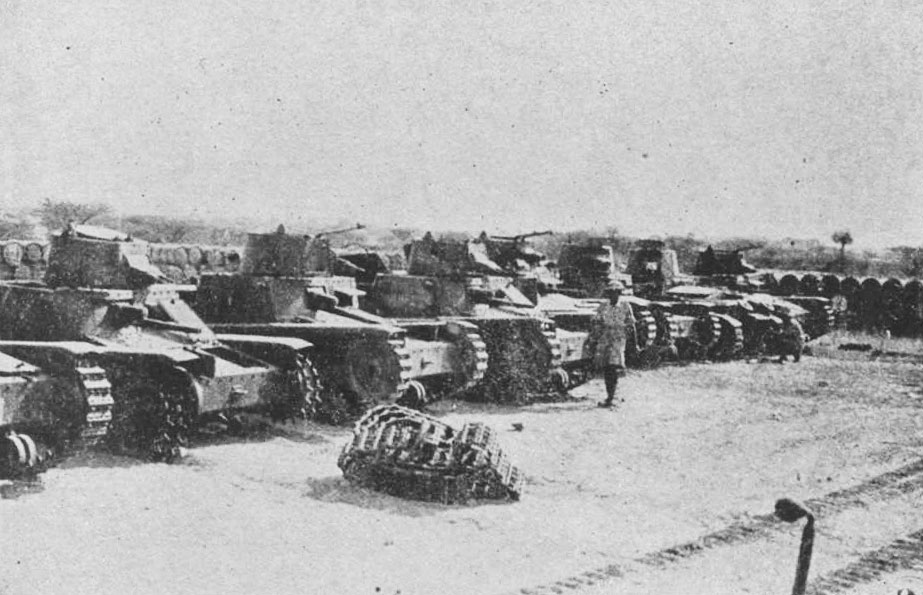
Italian M11/39 tanks captured at the Battle of Agordat, Eritrea, 1941

On 19 January 1941, the British counterattacked, with the Indian 4th and Indian 5th Infantry Divisions, invading from Sudan. A supporting attack was made from Kenya by the South African 1st Division, the 11th African Division, and the 12th African Division. On 16 March, a seaborne invasion by British Indian infantry re-took the capital of British Somaliland, Berbera.

The Allied victory in the Battle of Keren in February and March 1941 sealed the fate of Italian East Africa. It was followed by the capture of Asmara (the capital of Italian Eritrea) and Massawa; which forced the destroyers at the port to put to sea where they were scuttled or sunk. Four submarines evaded the British and sailed to Bordeaux. The Ethiopian capital of Addis Ababa fell on 5 April. The Italian Viceroy, Prince Amedeo, surrendered at Amba Alagi in May. The surrender of the Italian force at Gondar on 27 November is generally considered to be the end of the campaign.

== Balkans ==
=== Invasion of Greece ===
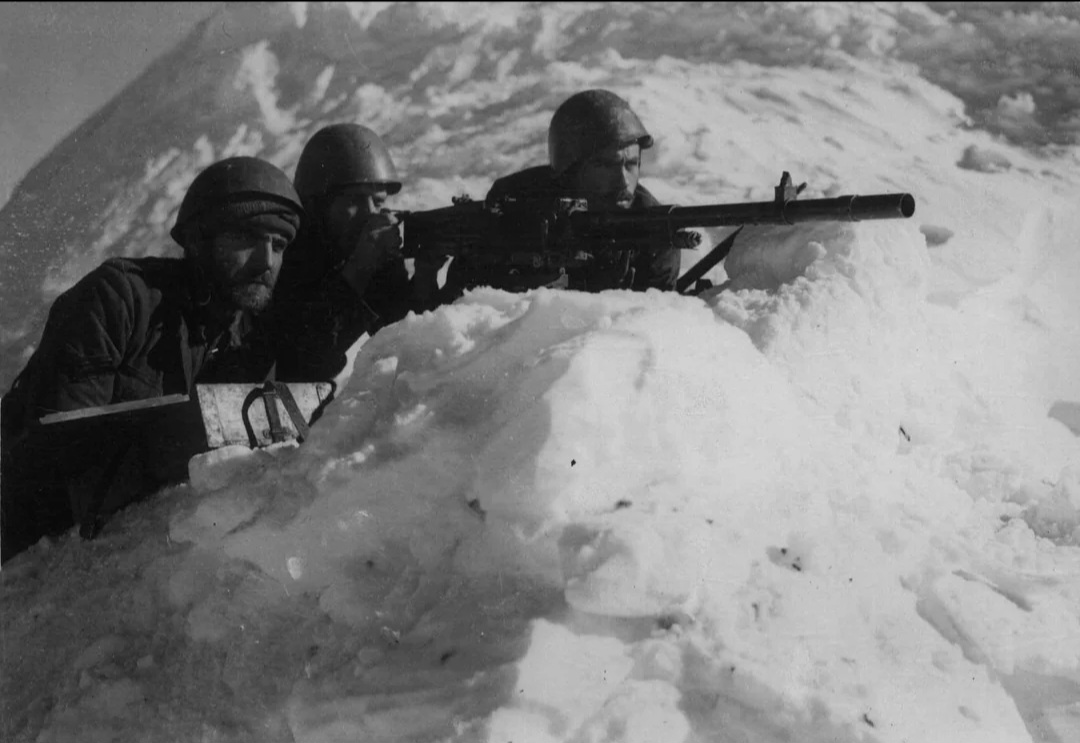
Italian army machine gun crew in action in the Greco-Italian War, 1940

Mussolini was eager to follow up the conquest of Albania with further territorial expansion in the Balkans, so plans were drafted to invade Greece and Yugoslavia. The decision to attack Greece was driven by opportunism, as Rome viewed it as a soft target, being a smaller country. Also, Mussolini was spurred into action after learning in September 1940 that Hitler planned to send troops to Romania, which occurred on 8 October, expanding the Reich's sphere of influence in the Balkans. Consequently, Mussolini concluded he needed to act before the Fuhrer turned Greece and Yugoslavia into German vassals. Rome also wanted a show of Italian strength, as Hitler was working to draw Vichy France into the Axis; something the Duce feared would prevent him seizing French territories.

The Greco-Italian War began on 28 October 1940, with the Italian army in Albania advancing at a sluggish pace into the mountainous countryside of Epirus, hampered by the destruction of bridges, flooding and determined resistance from the Greek army. The offensive was halted on 7 November, the Italians having achieved limited gains.

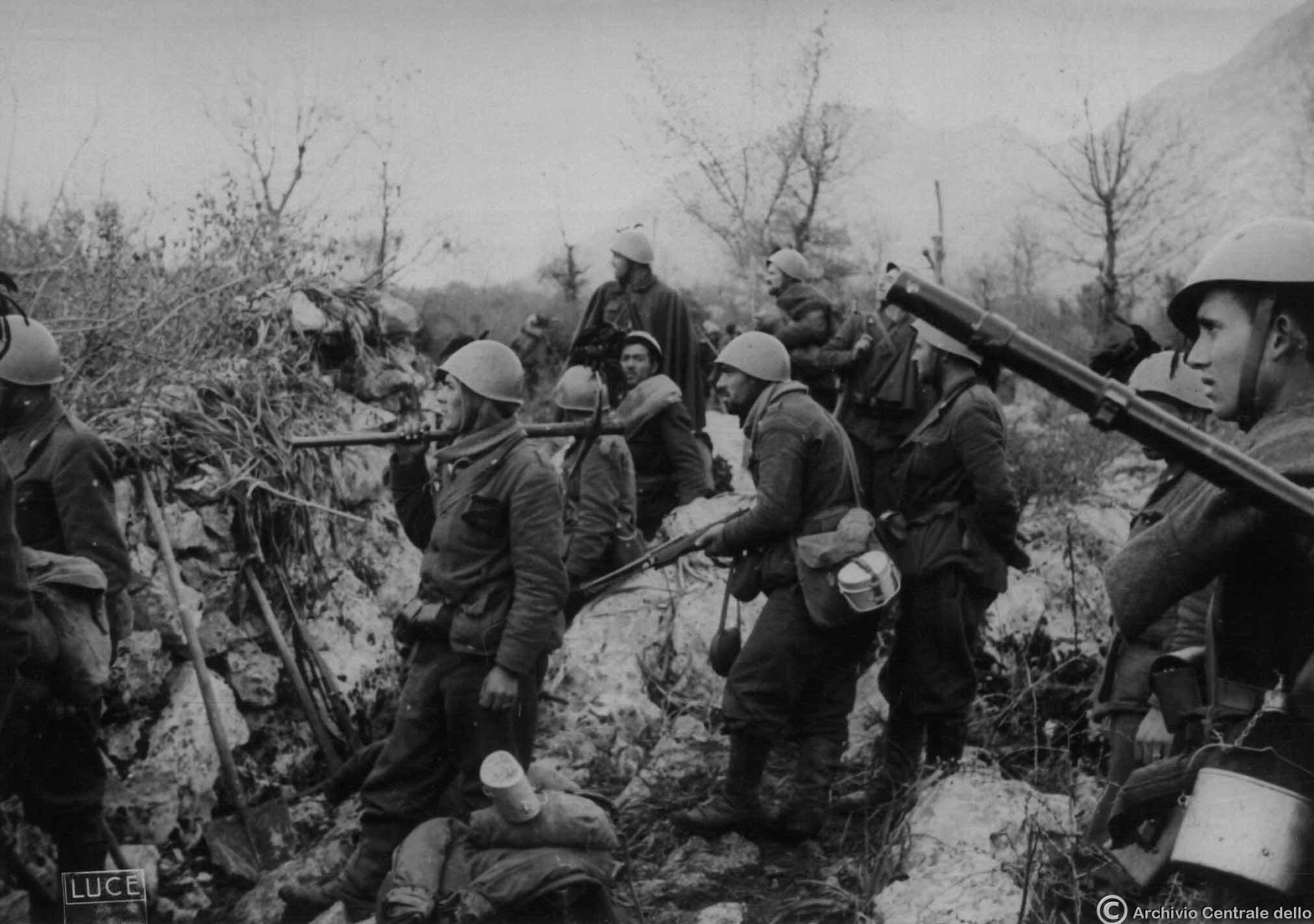
Bersaglieri at the front in Greece, 1941

Taking advantage of Bulgaria's decision to remain neutral to redeploy troops to the Epirus front, the Greek Commander-in-Chief, Lt Gen Alexandros Papagos, was able to establish numerical superiority. On 14 November, Papagos launched a counter-offensive that drove the Italians back over the border and turned into a Greek invasion of Albania. By late November, the weather was getting colder but winter uniforms had not been issued to Italian troops; while the army was hampered by poor communications. Mussolini’s forces were in full retreat and reinforcements had to be rushed to Albania.

A new offensive in March 1941 made little progress, in part because the Greeks knew it was coming, having found a set of orders on a captured Italian officer. Greek artillery inflicted heavy losses on the attackers.

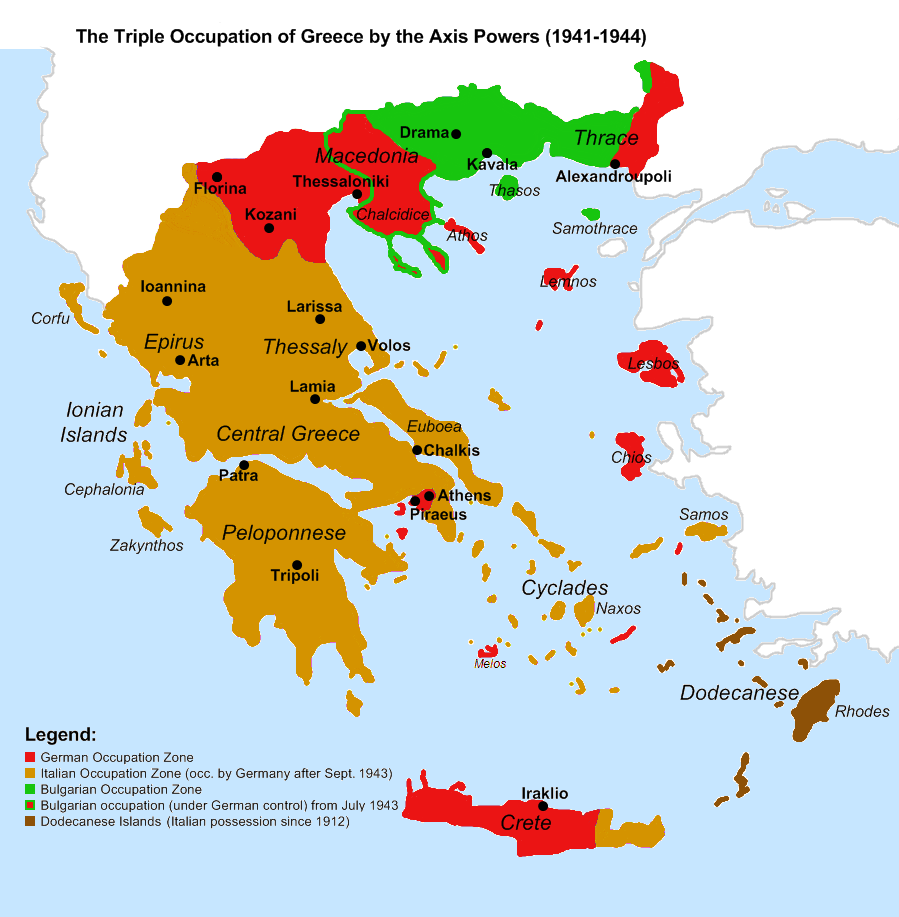
The three occupation zones. Italian German annexed by Bulgaria.

From November 1940, British bombers (and some fighters) commenced operations from Greek bases, which raised the possibility of future air raids against Romanian oil fields (which were critical to the Nazi war effort). In March 1941, a force of British Commonwealth ground troops – consisting of two infantry divisions and an armoured brigade – began arriving on the Greek mainland, with the first elements reaching Greece on 7 March 1941, six days after Bulgaria joined the Axis. This prompted Hitler to order a German offensive against Greece and Yugoslavia (where a coup had deposed the German-friendly government).

The Germans attacked Greece on 6 April 1941, smashing through the depleted garrisons opposing them, with the Greek mainland falling to the Axis by the end of the month. The Germans completed the conquest of Greece by capturing the last bastion of resistance, the island of Crete, in May 1941.

The Greco-Italian War damaged the reputations of Mussolini and his generals. Attacking Greece had been intended to raise the prestige of Italy within the Axis, but it had the opposite effect and, along with the defeat in North Africa in winter 1940/41, had left Italy the subordinate in its alliance with Germany.

=== Invasion of Yugoslavia ===
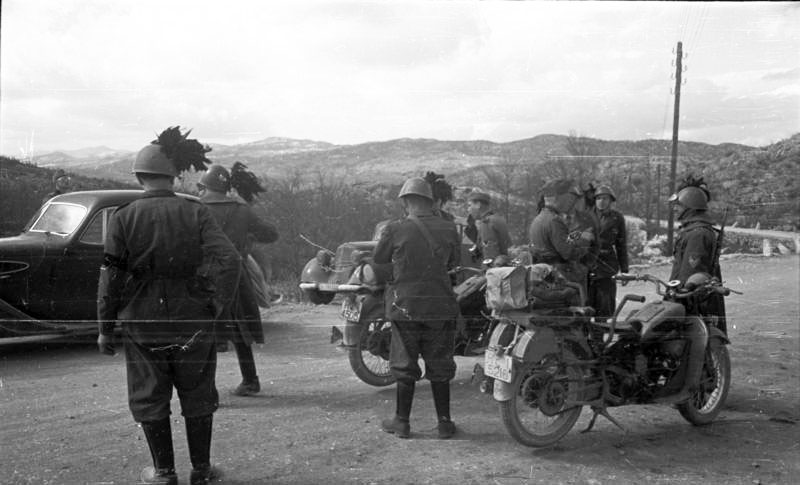
Bersaglieri during the invasion of Yugoslavia

On 6 April 1941, Germany began its simultaneous invasions of both Yugoslavia and Greece. Although Mussolini had contemplated invading Yugoslavia in 1940, in the 1941 invasion Germany did most of the work of breaking the Yugoslav military, with Italy and Hungary in secondary roles.

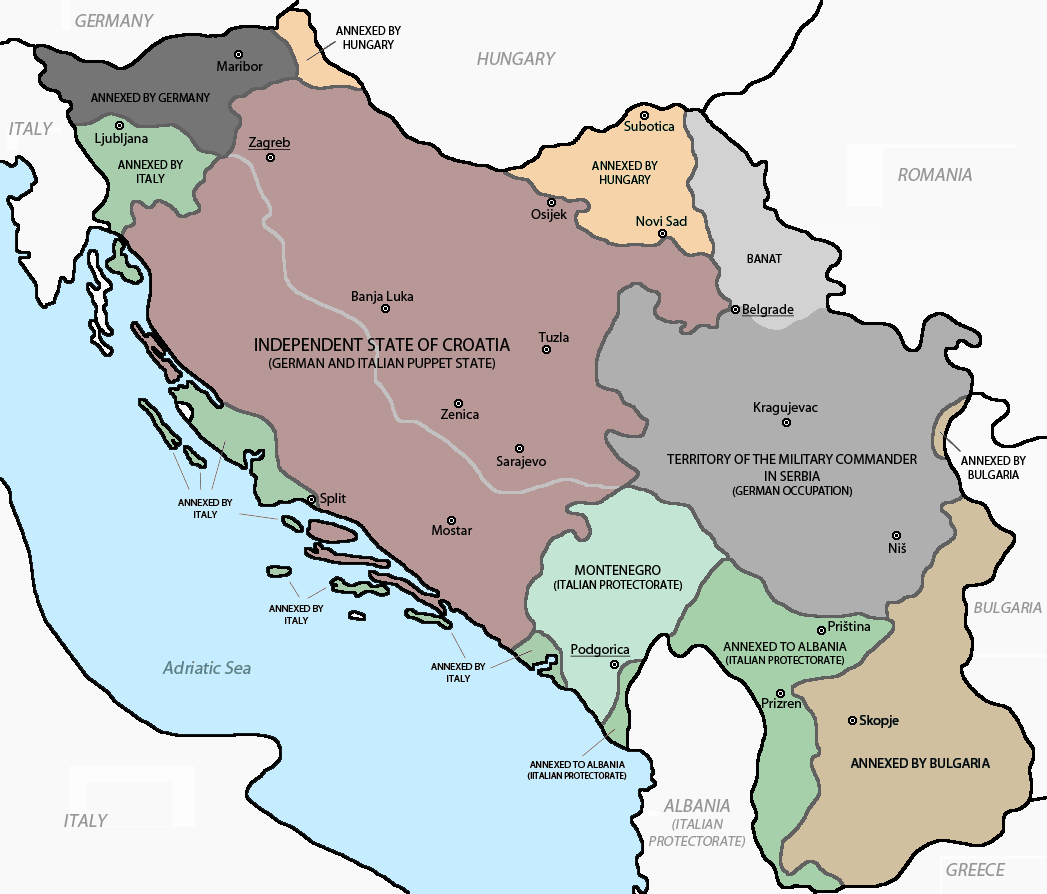
Occupation and partition of Yugoslavia 1941

The Yugoslavs launched small incursions into Albania on 7–8 April 1941, but on 11 April, Italian forces counter-attacked and crossed into Yugoslavia. Further north, the Italian Second Army in northern Italy crossed the border on 11 April and captured Ljubljana in Slovenia. On 3 May, it was renamed 'Lubiana' and annexed, becoming an Italian province, a move which was followed by mass deportations of many ethnic Slovenes to concentration camps. Dubrovnik was captured on 17 April, where the Italian forces invading from the north linked up with those advancing from Albania.

Yugoslavia's armed forces formally surrendered on 18 April 1941 – although in reality, this marked a shift from a conventional war to a complicated, multi-factional guerrilla war that was costly for the Axis. Italy annexed Dalmatia, occupied Montenegro and added Yugoslav territory to Albania. Other regions were occupied by Bulgaria, Germany and Hungary. An Axis puppet state was created, the Independent State of Croatia, under the nominal sovereignty of Prince Aimone, Duke of Aosta, but actually governed by the Croatian leader Ante Pavelić, who presided over a "regime of terror".

=== Occupation and Anti-Partisan Operations ===
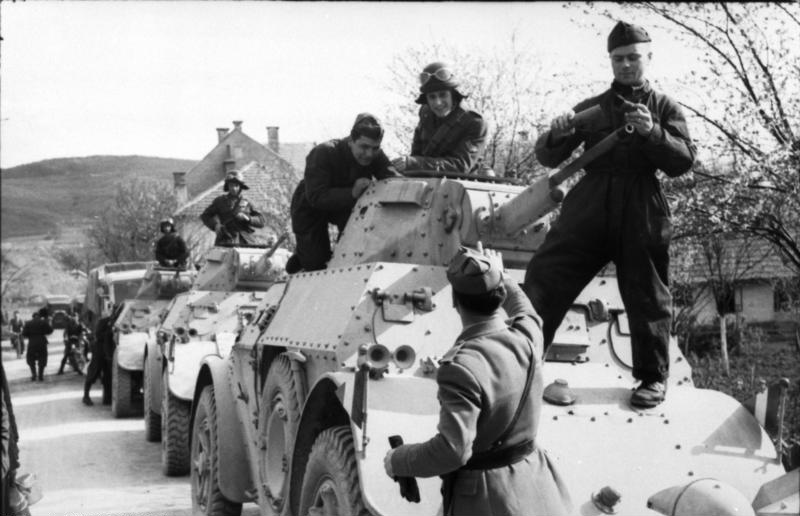
Column of Italian armoured cars in the Balkans

During the Axis occupation of Greece, Italy was given the most territory to garrison. However, occupying Greece turned into a drain on its overstretched military resources, as a major resistance uprising soon began. The comprehensive looting of Greece by the Axis occupiers caused widespread famine, which fuelled public support for the resistance. Reprisals by Italian troops for partisan attacks included burning down villages and the execution of civilians. In many rural districts Italian garrisons were eventually driven out by the resistance. Athanassiou described Italy’s army in Greece as, “unspectacular, both as an occupation and as an anti-partisan force”.

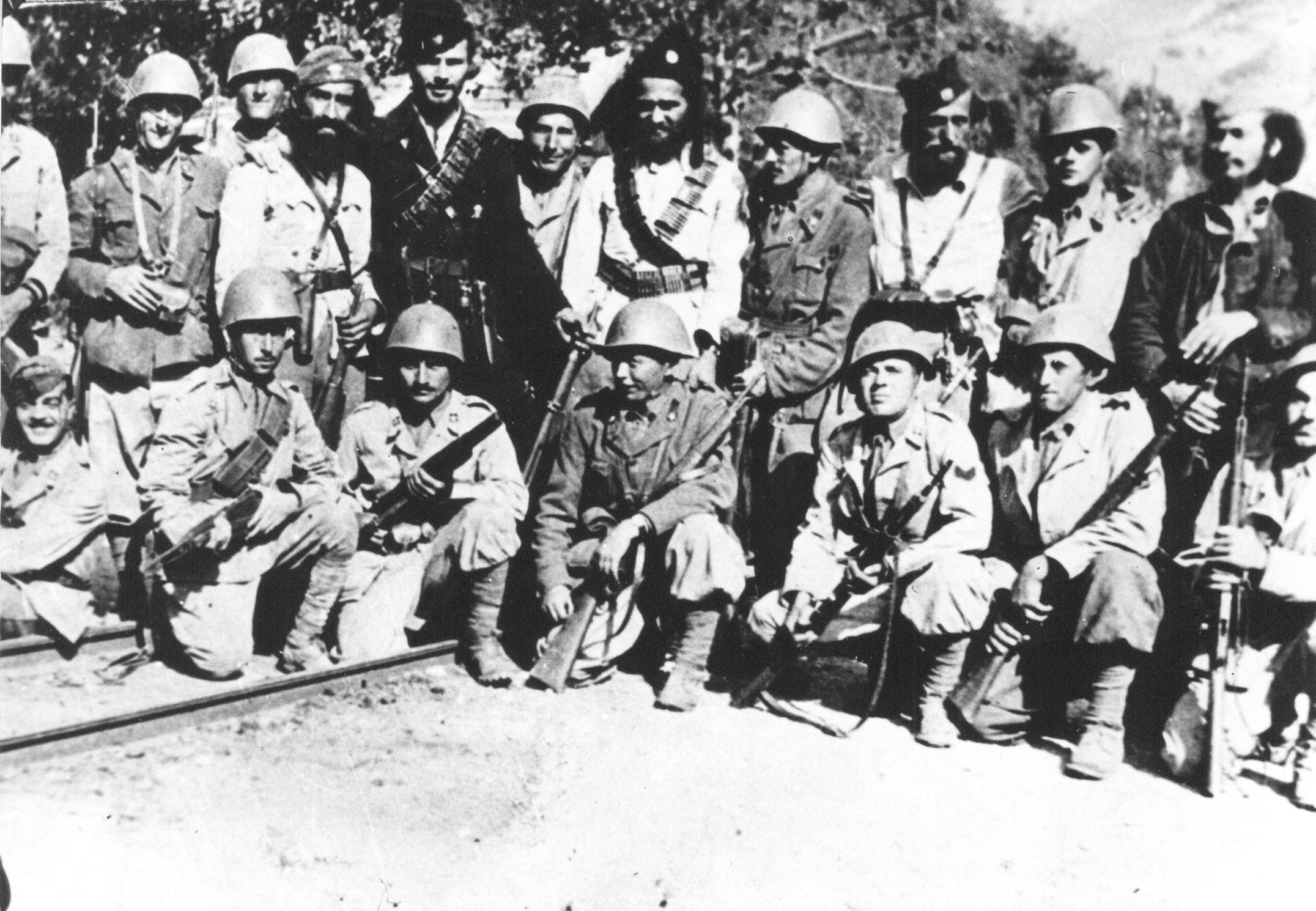
Italian soldiers and Chetniks in Jablanica in 1943

By the summer of 1941, across the former-Yugoslavia, nationalist, ideological and religious tensions were turning violent, and according to Gooch, "in every one of Italy's new Balkan fiefdoms the Italian army found itself standing on highly unstable ground". The Italian occupation forces soon found themselves facing a major uprising in Montenegro in July 1941, which was defeated, but more revolts then followed elsewhere.

The Italian military pursued a brutal counterinsurgency campaign, including summary executions, burning down villages and deportations to concentration camps. The two main guerrilla forces were the communist Yugoslav Partisans and the royalist / Serbian nationalist Chetniks. Demonstrating the extent of the bitter factionalism, at times the Chetniks collaborated with the Italians and other Axis forces and fought against the communist partisans. Several major anti-partisan offensives were launched by the Italians, sometimes working with the Germans and Croatians. These operations tended to displace the partisans from one region to another, rather than truly defeating them. The war against the partisans was also hampered by poor co-operation between the Axis armies.

== Mediterranean ==
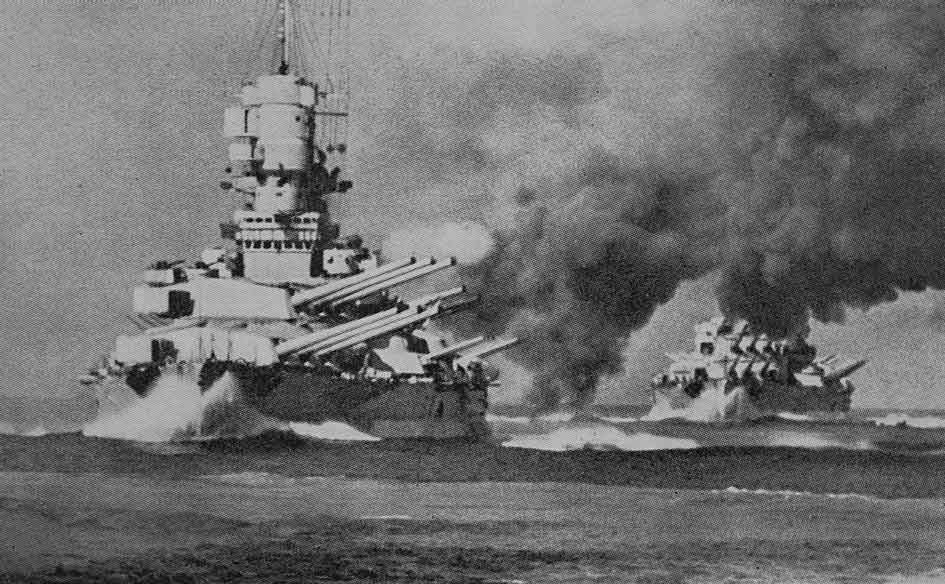
Italian battleships Vittorio Veneto and Littorio

In 1940, the Regia Marina had a large and modern fleet, and the Italian peninsula occupied a central position in the Mediterranean Sea. The opposing British Royal Navy had a strong fleet, the advantage of aircraft carriers and naval bases in strategic locations. After some early inconclusive engagements, such as the Battle of Calabria, the Italian Navy mostly declined to engage in a confrontation of capital ships. So, for both navies, escorting convoys became the main duty in the Mediterranean.

However, the theatre did see important innovations in naval warfare. On 11 November, Britain used carrier-launched Fairey Swordfish torpedo bombers to attack Taranto. The raid left three Italian battleships crippled – one of the ships would play no further part in the war.

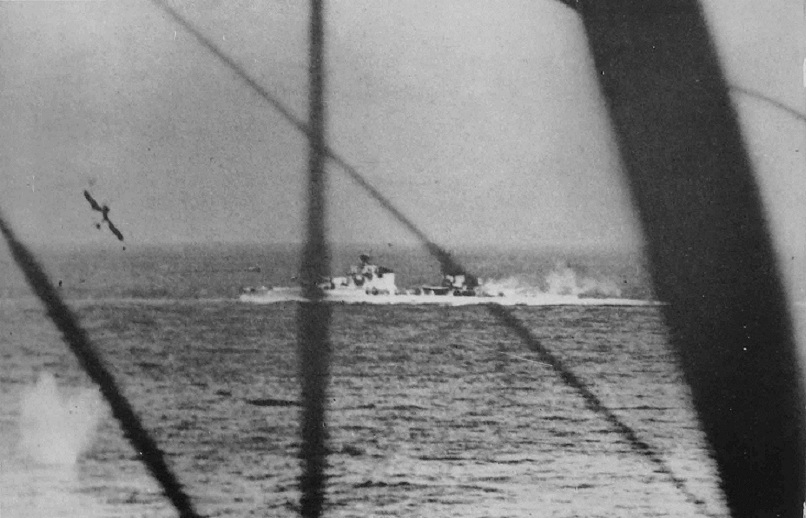
The heavy cruiser, Bolzano, under air attack at the Battle of Cape Matapan

During the invasion of Greece, the Regia Marina fought a major surface fleet action in the eastern Mediterranean, the Battle of Cape Matapan. The British went into the battle with significant advantages, particularly Ultra signal intercepts, an aircraft carrier, and a surface-search radar set aboard HMS Valiant – a recent innovation which could detect surface ships up to a range of 16 miles (26 km). The Italians suffered the loss of three heavy cruisers and two destroyers sunk, plus a battleship and one destroyer damaged. The British losses were relatively light, with one aircraft destroyed and four light cruisers damaged.

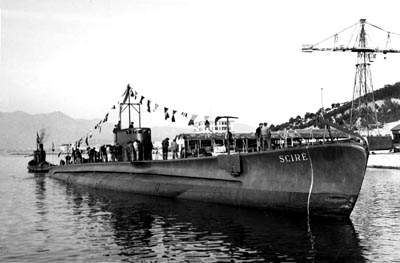
Submarine Scirè used in the Raid on Alexandria (1941)

The Italian navy found other ways to attack the British. An innovative and successful campaign involved the use of frogmen, manned torpedoes and motor boats packed with explosives to attack ships in harbour. Decima Flottiglia MAS sank or damaged 28 ships from September 1940 to the end of 1942. These included the battleships HMS Queen Elizabeth and HMS Valiant, which were badly damaged during the Raid on Alexandria harbour on 18 December 1941.

In 1942, the Italians went on the offensive to isolate Malta, achieving some success at the Second Battle of Sirte in March, and Operation Vigorous and Operation Harpoon in June. However, the oil supplies brought to Malta in August 1942 at great cost by Operation Pedestal kept the strategic naval and air bases there operational. By May 1943, Axis forces were conclusively defeated in North Africa, in part thanks to Allied interdiction of their supply convoys.

== Eastern Front ==
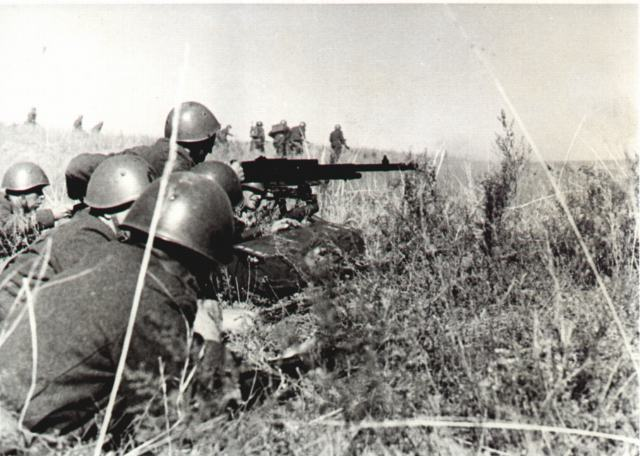
Italian infantry in action in the Soviet Union

On 22 June 1941, Italy declared war on the Soviet Union. On 10 July, around 62,000 Italian troops of the Italian Expeditionary Corps in Russia (Corpo di Spedizione Italiano in Russia, CSIR) left for the Eastern Front to aid in the German invasion of the Soviet Union (Operation Barbarossa). The campaign began well for the Italians, who at the Battle of Petrikowka (27-30 September), commanded by General Messe, encircled the opposing Soviet force and took around 10,000 prisoners. It has been described as one of Italy’s “brightest operations” of World War II. This was followed by a 250 km advance for the CSIR, despite worsening weather conditions and determined Red Army resistance, to capture the important industrial city of Stalino (present day Donetsk) on 20 October. On 3 November, they took the city of Gorlovka. However, the opposition was stiffening, as some of the fighting for Gorlovka was hand-to-hand and with bayonets, while the rear of the column suffered partisan attacks.

In December 1941, with supply lines overstretched, troops exhausted and the weather deteriorating, the Italians switched to the defensive. Having learnt from the Greek War, winter uniforms were distributed but few were in white camouflage. Between 25-31 December, the CSIR fought the Christmas Battle which saw the Italians halt a Soviet offensive intended to recapture Stalino. The CSIR then launched a counterattack, with German support including Panzer III tanks, which retook the lost ground. Around 1,300 Soviet prisoners were taken.

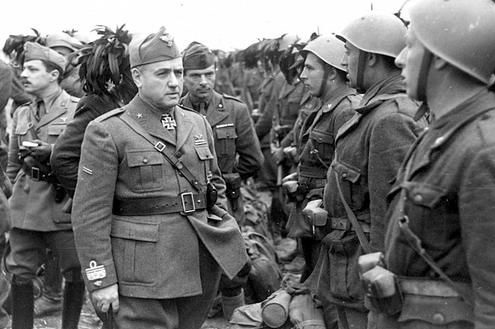
General Giovanni Messe inspecting Bersaglieri on the Eastern Front

In July 1942, the CSIR was expanded to a full army of about 200,000 men named the Italian Army in Russia (Armata Italiana in Russia, or ARMIR), also known as the 8th Army. It was placed under the command of General Italo Gariboldi - Messe had opposed the enlargement.

From August 1942 to February 1943, the 8th Army took part in the decisive Battle of Stalingrad, where the Red Army isolated German forces by attacking the over-stretched Hungarian, Romanian, and Italian forces protecting the Germans' flanks. The Italians suffered heavy losses (some 84,830 dead or missing) during the battle and subsequent retreat. Around 70,000 Italian soldiers were taken prisoner, and due to harsh conditions in Soviet prison camps just 10,032 lived to return to Italy again in 1946.

In January 1943, during a Soviet offensive against the Alpini Corps, the 2nd Tridentina Division at the Battle of Nikolayevka successfully broke out of a Red Army encirclement, fighting its way back to Axis lines. By the summer of 1943, Rome had withdrawn the remnants of the 8th Army to Italy, with the Italians and Germans exchanging accusations on who was to blame for the defeat the Axis had suffered during the Southern Russia campaign. The heavy casualties suffered in the Soviet Union contributed to the collapse in public support for Mussolini's regime in 1943.

== The Home Front ==
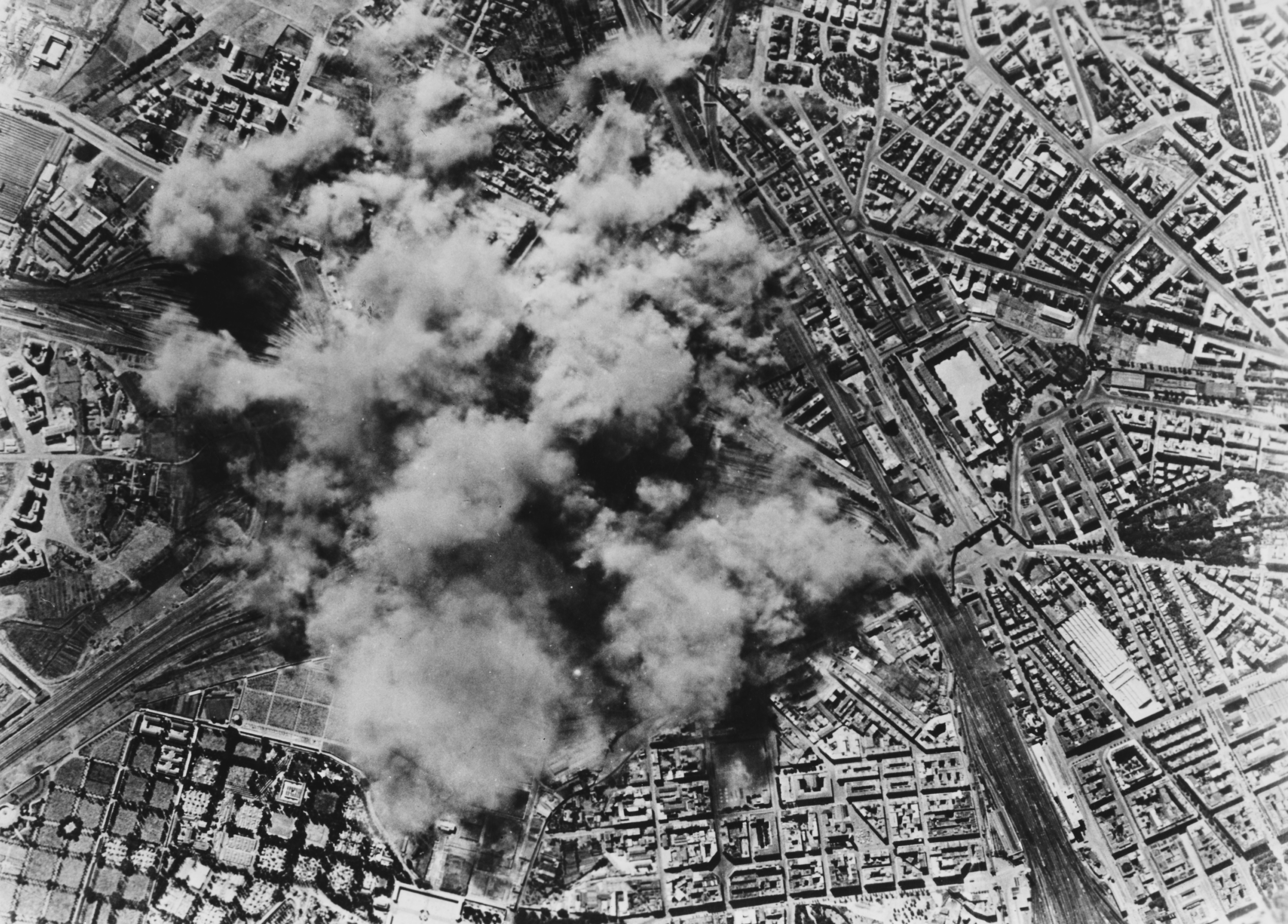
Allied air raid on Rome, 1943

The outbreak of war saw big demands being made of the Italian population, and this placed a strain on the economy, society and adversely impacted the popularity of the war. When Allied air raids on Italy began, there were few air raid shelters and according to Behan in the big industrial cities, "people would frequently walk out and sleep in the surrounding countryside". Prior to 1943, anti-aircraft gun batteries in Italy did not have radios or radar. Air raid sirens sometimes only sounded after the bombing had started and false alarms were common.

Food was in short supply resulting in rapid price inflation, but wages did not keep pace which spread discontent, as shown by a rise in the number of industrial strikes in early 1943. Many agricultural workers in Sicily struggled to obtain shoes, as the price had risen from around 150 lire a pair before the war to 1,000 lire in 1943. According to Behan, "by early 1943 the anti-fascists had grown in confidence, as they could see more and more people agreeing with them."

== The war in the air ==
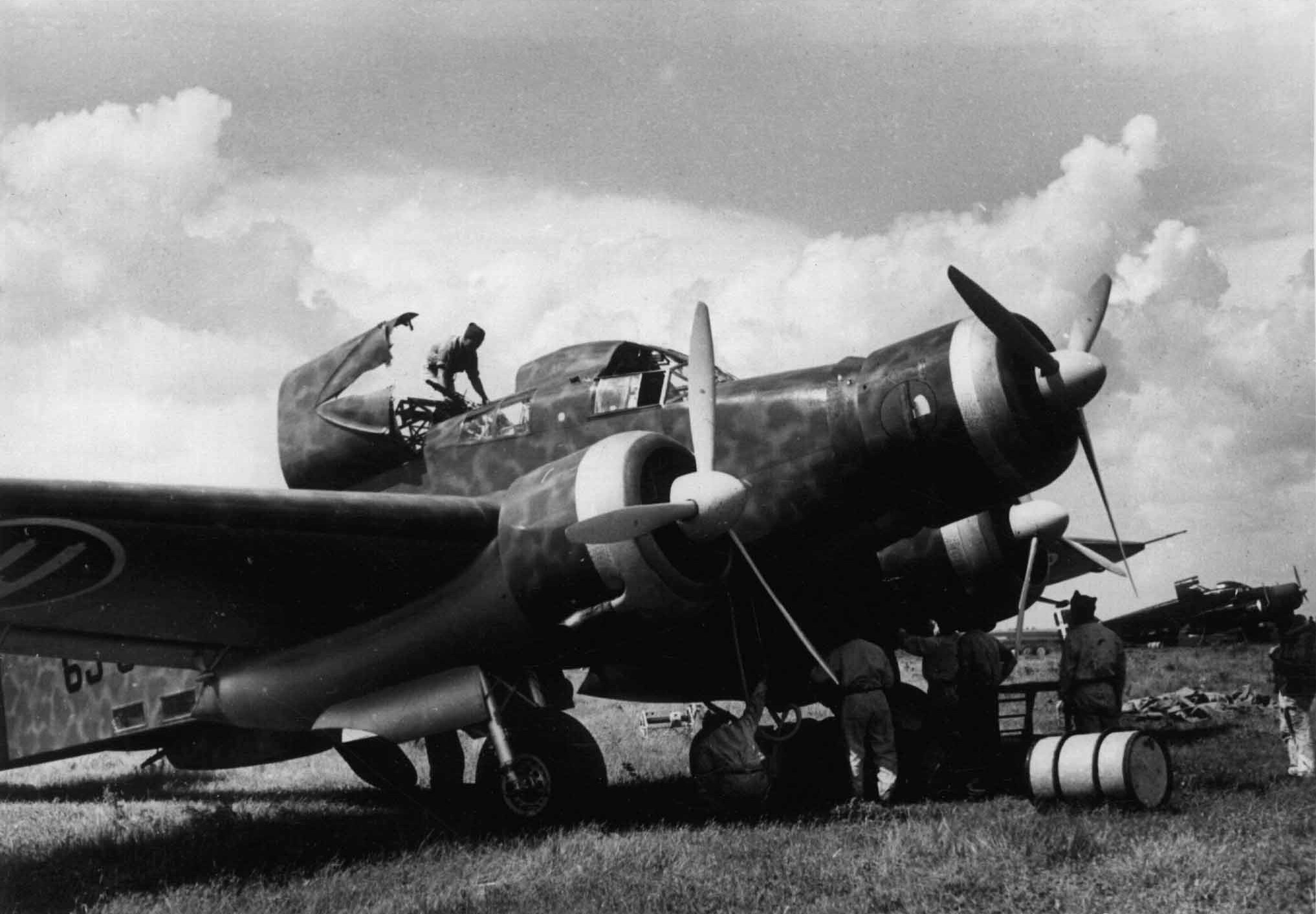
Italian SM.79 Sparviero bomber being refuelled in Sicily

Italy entered World War II with recent experience of strategic bombing gained in the Spanish Civil War, and its Savoia-Marchetti SM.79 Sparviero was an effective early-war bomber. The Regia Aeronautica went straight into action on Italy's declaration of war, launching raids against Malta on 10 June 1940, initiating a long air campaign against the islands. On 15 July, Italian bombers struck Haifa, the first of several Axis air raids against Mandatory Palestine. In October, a force of 75 bombers, plus 98 fighters, was sent to Belgium to participate in the Blitz air offensive against Great Britain, although many of the aircraft were obsolescent and unsuited to the northern European climate.

In 1940, the Regia Aeronautica was operating many fighters that were biplanes, as the Spanish Civil War had given a false impression in Rome that they were far from obsolescent. In early World War II, the British Royal Air Force (RAF) had numerous squadrons in the Mediterranean and Africa flying Gloster Gladiator biplanes, which meant at first many Italian fighters were facing technologically similar opponents. In the East African campaign, where both sides mainly used older aircraft, seven Italian pilots became aces.

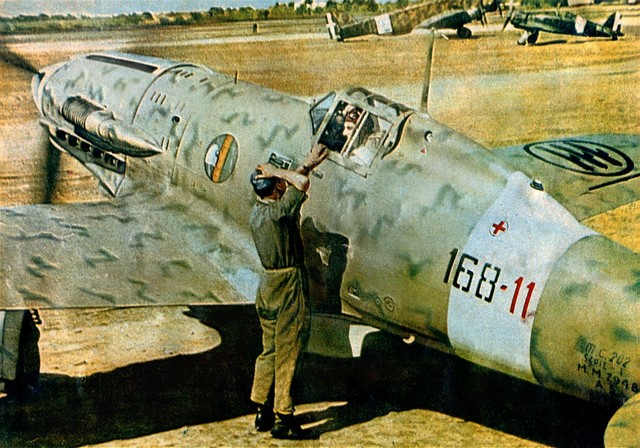
Macchi C.202 fighter prepares for takeoff, 1943

As the war progressed, the RAF replaced its Gladiators with monoplanes, so Italy's biplanes became obsolete, giving the British the upper hand. The situation improved as more Italian squadrons received monoplanes. From late 1941, the new Macchi C.202 Folgore began arriving in North Africa, which proved to be a successful fighter. However, British groundcrews in the desert war managed to keep a higher percentage of aircraft serviceable (73%–77% for the British versus 60% for the Italians). By the time of the El Alamein battles 600 to 700 Axis aircraft (including transport planes) were facing around 1,000 Allied fighters and bombers. In October 1942, the bomber offensive against Malta was abandoned, the islands having successfully held out through the air raids and siege.

By 1943, advanced fighter aircraft were completing development, but these were delivered too late in the war and in too small numbers to make a difference. Examples include the Fiat G.55 Centauro, the Macchi C.205 and the Re.2005 Sagittario, which were modern, high performance fighters, but by the time they entered service the war had moved against Italy. The Centauro entered frontline service just weeks before the September 1943 armistice, while only 48 Sagittario were ever produced.

== Italian campaign ==
=== Allied invasion of Sicily and fall of Mussolini ===
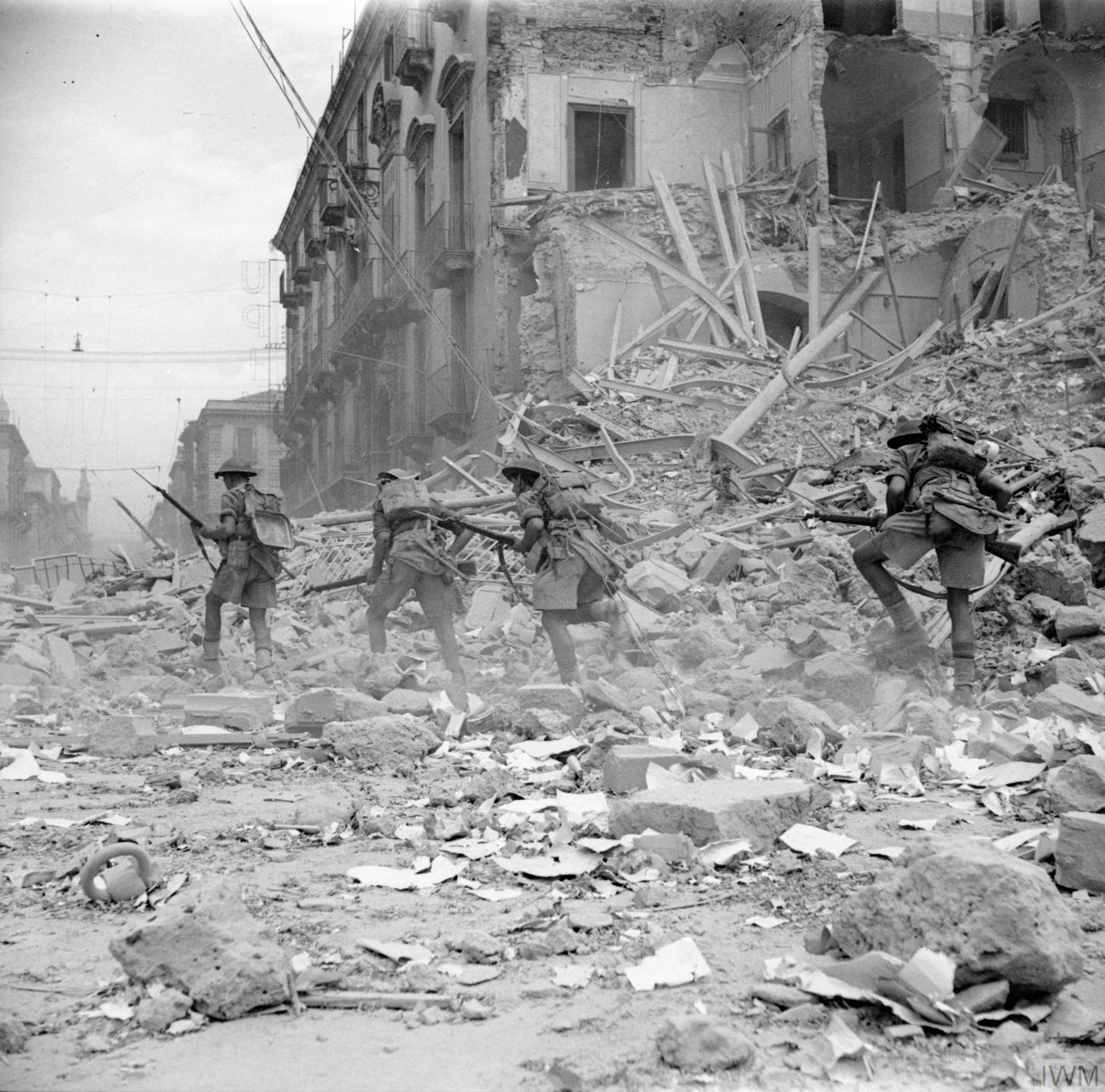
British troops in Sicily, August 1943

On 10 July 1943, the Allies invaded Sicily. The Axis lost the island after weeks of bitter fighting, but succeeded in ferrying large numbers of troops to the Italian mainland. On 19 July, an Allied air raid on Rome hit railways yards, a steel works and an airport, and damaged homes near the targets. Subsequently, popular support in Italy for the war collapsed.

On 25 July, the Grand Council of Fascism voted to limit Mussolini's power and handed control of the armed forces to King Victor Emmanuel III. The next day, the King dismissed Mussolini as prime minister and replaced him with Marshal Badoglio. The Duce was arrested and imprisoned.

While publicly declaring continued loyalty the Axis, the Badoglio government began secret negotiations with the Allies on an armistice.

=== Armistice with the Allies and German invasion ===
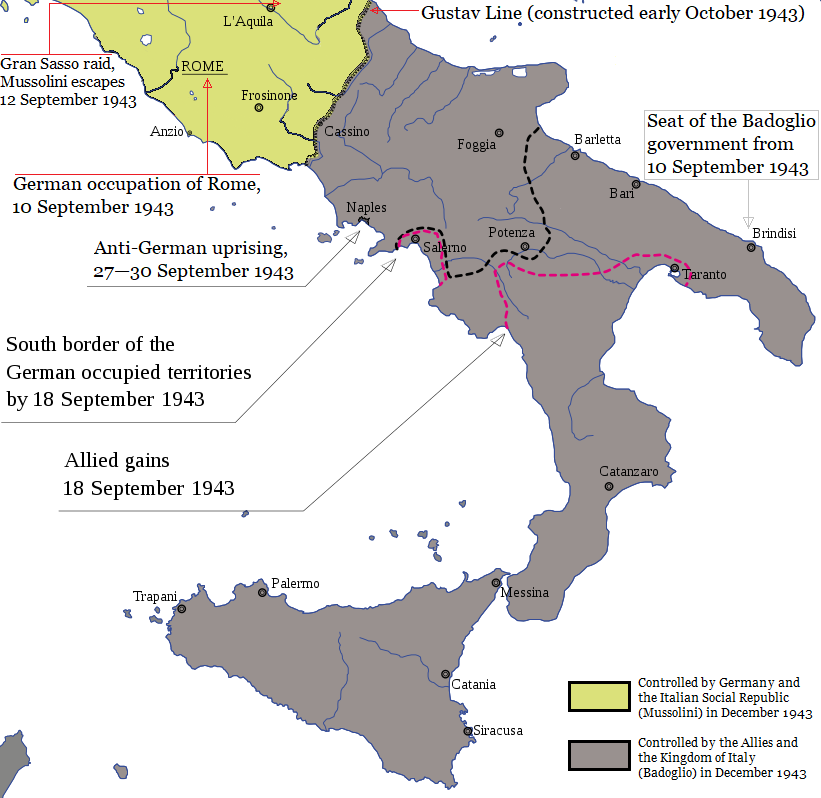
Chronology of the Italian military situation in September–December 1943

Throughout August 1943, fearful the Germans may try to rescue Mussolini, Badoglio had the deposed dictator transferred from one secret location to the next. On 3 September, an armistice was signed with the Allies in Sicily, but not made public straight away. That very day, British troops crossed the short distance from Sicily to the 'toe' of Italy in Operation Baytown, but the Badoglio government wanted an Allied landing near Rome before openly defecting, as the news would certainly spark war with Germany. Indeed, according to Goeschel, Hitler had for weeks been infiltrating German soldiers into Italy and preparing a coup to reinstall Mussolini. A landing close to Rome was considered high risk by the Allies, but further invasions at Salerno (South of Naples) and Taranto (on Italy's 'heel') were scheduled for 9 September. On 8 September, the Allies, having become tired of Rome delaying a public announcement, broadcast the news of the armistice on the radio, forcing Badoglio's hand.

The German military responded immediately by invading. Italian forces were disarmed, by force when met with resistance, and northern and central Italy was occupied, along with Italian-controlled zones in France and the Balkans.

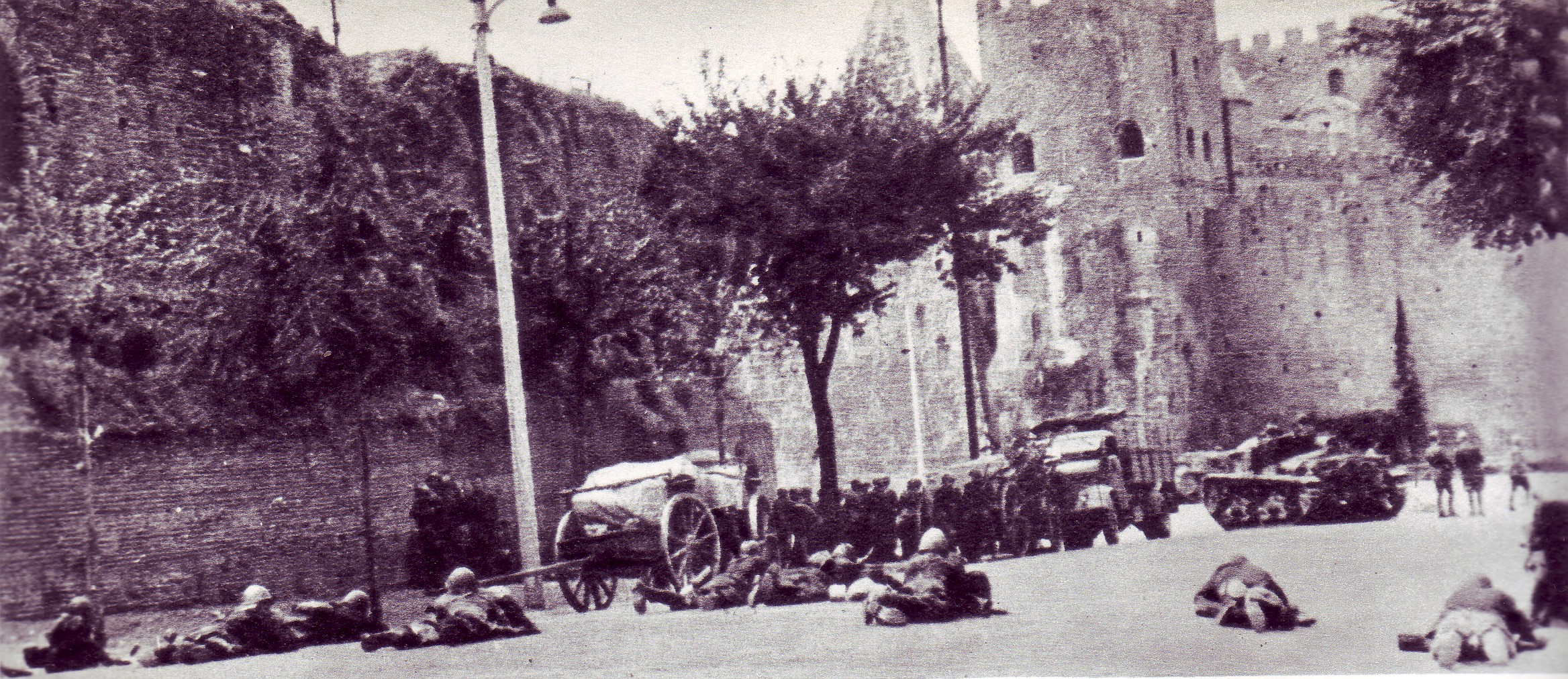
Italian soldiers preparing to clash with the Germans at Porta San Paolo in Rome, 10 September 1943

Skirmishing on the outskirts of Rome between German Parachute and Panzer Grenadier divisions and the Italian army began on 8 September 1943. King Victor Emmanuel III and his family, with Marshal Badoglio, General Roatta (the Army Chief of Staff), and others, fled Rome on 9 September, and headed to Allied-controlled Brindisi. The sudden departure of the senior figures in the government and high command led to confusion across the armed forces, a situation worsened by vaguely worded orders. Thus any hope of a concerted and nationwide response by Italy’s military to the German invasion was effectively undermined. Italian troops in Rome made a last stand at Porta San Paolo on 10 September. Then a ceasefire agreement declared Rome an open city, but in practice the Germans occupied the Italian capital.

As part of the terms of the armistice, the Italian fleet was to sail to Malta for internment, in some cases via Sardinia. En route, German bombers sank the Italian battleship Roma.

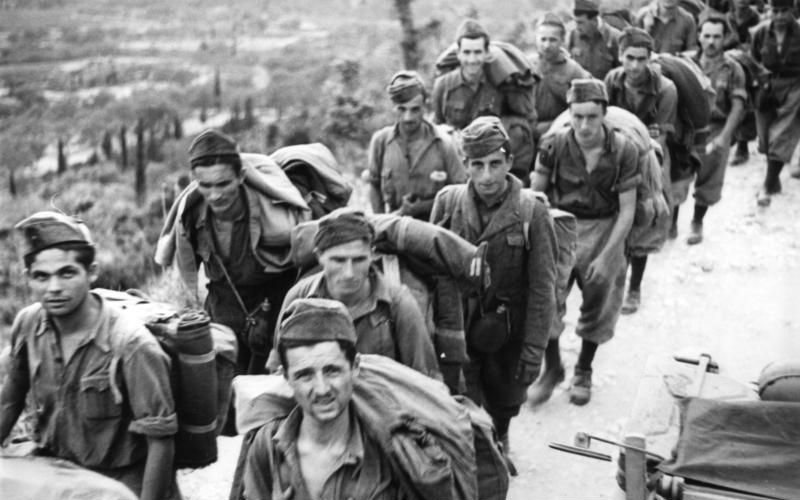
Italian soldiers taken prisoner by the Germans in Corfu, September 1943

On Cephalonia, the 12,000-strong Acqui Division resisted German disarmament in a nine day battle ending on 22 September. Over 5,000 Italian soldiers were massacred after they had surrendered. Another 3,000 were lost when ships transporting them from the island struck mines and sank.

The armistice was followed by a British campaign to seize the Italian Islands of the Aegean. German soldiers on Rhodes on news of Italy's defection quickly secured the island. Italian forces on Kos and Leros (and other islands) declared for the Allies on the arrival of British troops. The Germans gained air superiority, then invaded Kos and Leros, defeating the British and Italians. After surrendering, 103 Italian officers on Kos were executed.

Italian troops who did not resist disarmament were given a choice to keep fighting with the Germans, and the 615,000 who refused were designated Italian military internees and were transported as forced labour to Germany, of whom 30,000 died in captivity. Some Italian troops who evaded German capture in the Balkans joined the partisans – approximately 40,000 in Yugoslavia and 20,000 in Greece.

=== The RSI, co-belligerence and resistance ===
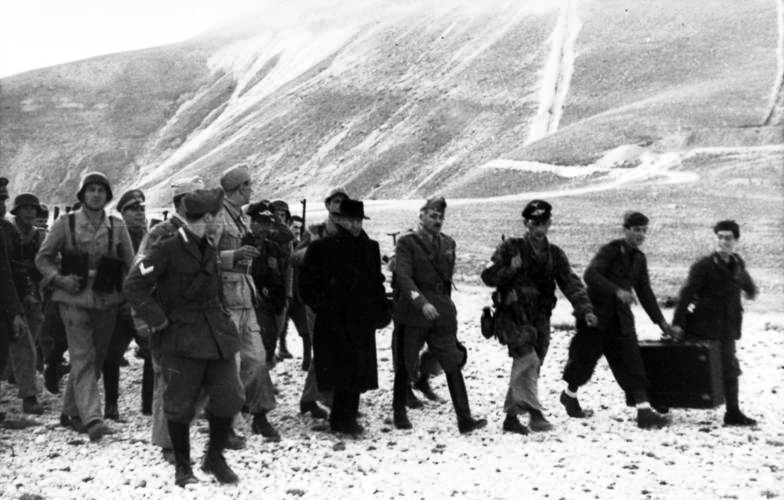
Mussolini rescued by German troops from his prison in Campo Imperatore on 12 September 1943

On 12 September 1943, Mussolini was rescued from imprisonment at Gran Sasso by the Germans in Operation Eiche. Once in northern Italy, he was installed as the head of a German puppet state, the Italian Social Republic or RSI, and leader of the new Republican Fascist Party.

The Allies soon controlled most of southern Italy, assisted by a major uprising against the Germans by the people of Naples. From an Italian perspective, the conflict now resembled a civil war between Fascists who collaborated with the Germans versus pro-Allied Italian forces.

On 13 October 1943, the Kingdom of Italy formally became a co-belligerent of the Allies by declaring war on Nazi Germany. Some Italian troops in the south were re-organized into what were known as Co-belligerent or Royalist forces, although at first some among the Allies were reluctant to trust and re-arm former-enemies.

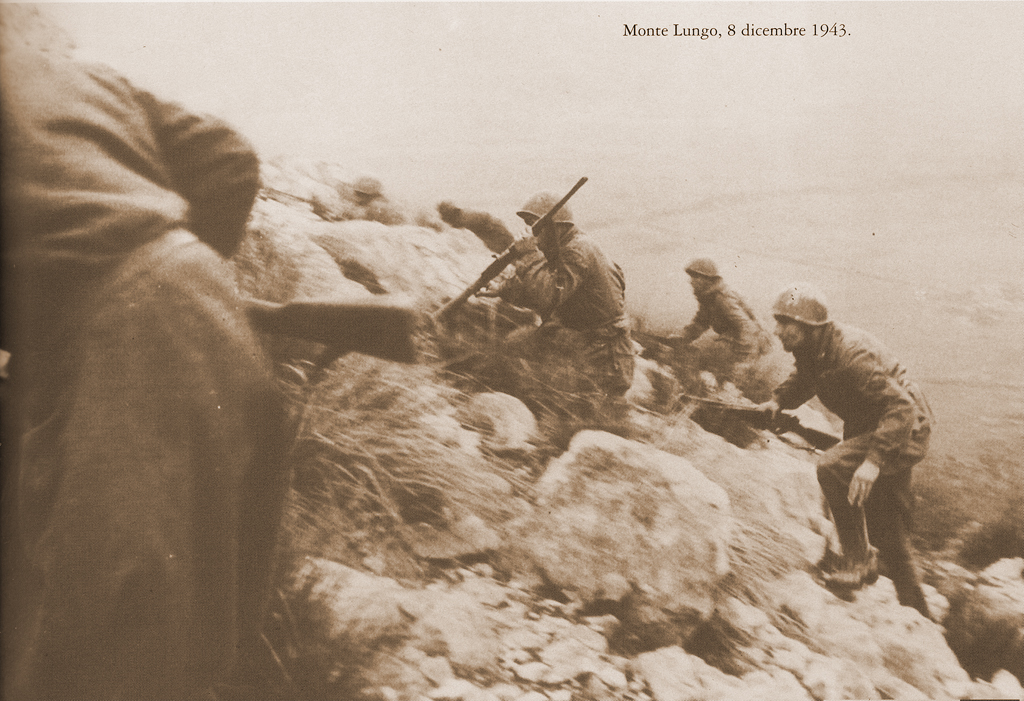
Co-belligerent troops assault Monte Lungo during the Battle of San Pietro Infine, December 1943

In Autumn 1943, the Co-belligerent Army raised its first combat unit, I Motorized Grouping, which in December 1943 fought at the Battle of San Pietro Infine alongside US troops, where it suffered heavy casualties but persuaded the Allies that more Italian combat units should be raised. The Co-belligerent force was expanded, becoming Corpo Italiano di Liberazione (CIL), which grew to a strength of 22,000. It served in the frontline in central Italy, "acquitting itself well" in combat according to Jowett. Further growth saw the CIL replaced by six 'Combat Groups', each consisting of two infantry regiments and one artillery regiment. They were re-equipped with British uniforms, helmets and weapons. During the Italian Campaign, 90,000 Co-belligerent soldiers fought in the frontline, while another 500,000 provided logistical and other support to Allied forces in Italy. The commander of the US Fifth Army, General Clark said of the Co-belligerent Army, “The Italian regular units took some heavy losses and fought well in the last year of the war”. After the Armistice, 250,000 Italian POWs held by the Allies volunteered for Service Units who carried out non-combatant war-related work in the United States, Europe, India and even as far afield as Australia.

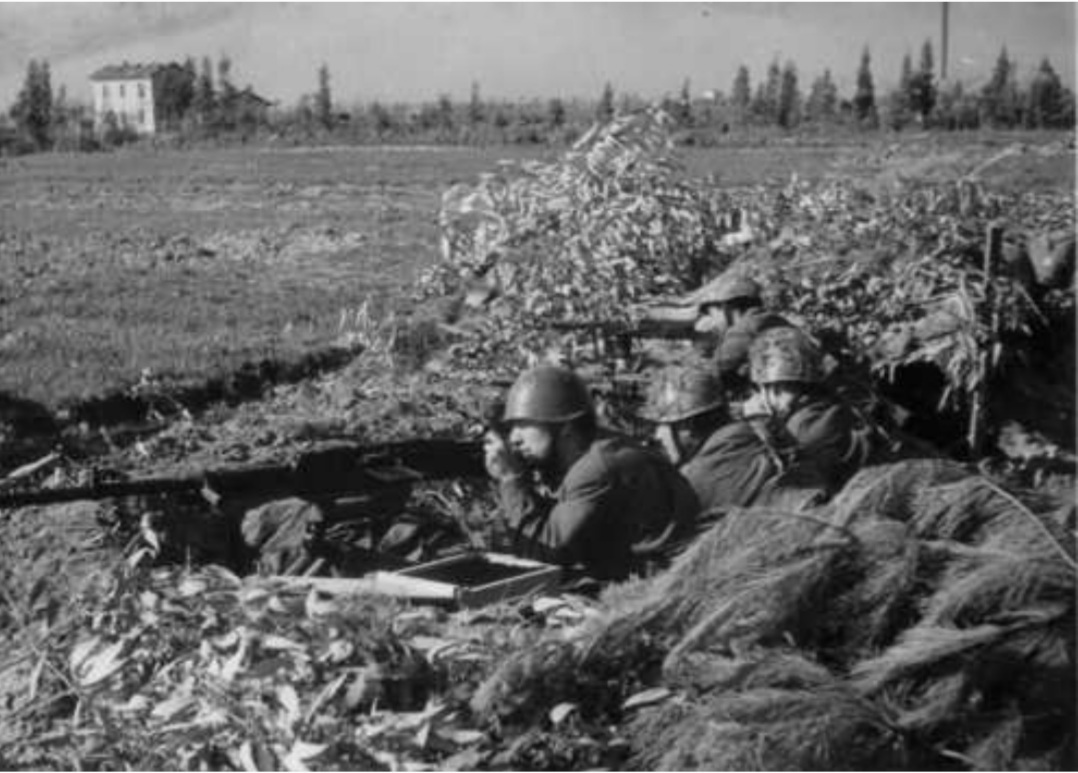
Soldiers of the National Republican Army during the Battle of Anzio, 1944

The army of the RSI was the Esercito Nazionale Repubblicano or ENR, which mostly saw action against Italian partisans, although it did at times fight the Allies. Established with those troops who had agreed to continue fighting for the Axis, it was then expanded by recruiting in the camps holding Italian military internees in Germany. Some internees joined the ENR simply to escape the poor conditions in the camps. Also deployed against the resistance was the organisation that replaced the pre-Armistice Blackshirts militia, the Guardia Nazionale Repubblicana or GNR, which operated as a gendarmerie. However, as the resistance threat grew additional local militias were raised, known as the Black Brigades, to reinforce the GNR. In late 1943, a regiment of Italian Waffen-SS volunteers was formed, which by 1945 had expanded into a division, the 29th Waffen Grenadier Division of the SS (1st Italian). There were also several different paratrooper units scattered across the armed services, reflecting the improvised nature of the RSI military, which contained many autonomous outfits.

After the September 1943 armistice, Regia Aeronautica forces in northern and central Italy were disarmed by the Germans, and later became the pro-Axis Aeronautica Nazionale Repubblicana. It suffered heavy losses in the face of Allied air superiority, while attempts to absorb it into the Luftwaffe hampered operations. The pro-Allied Aeronautica Co-Belligerante was cut off from the bulk of the Italian aircraft industry in northern Italy, so faced shortages of parts until eventually re-equipped with Allied aeroplanes. It was largely used in missions over the Balkans to supply and support Yugoslav and Albanian partisans.

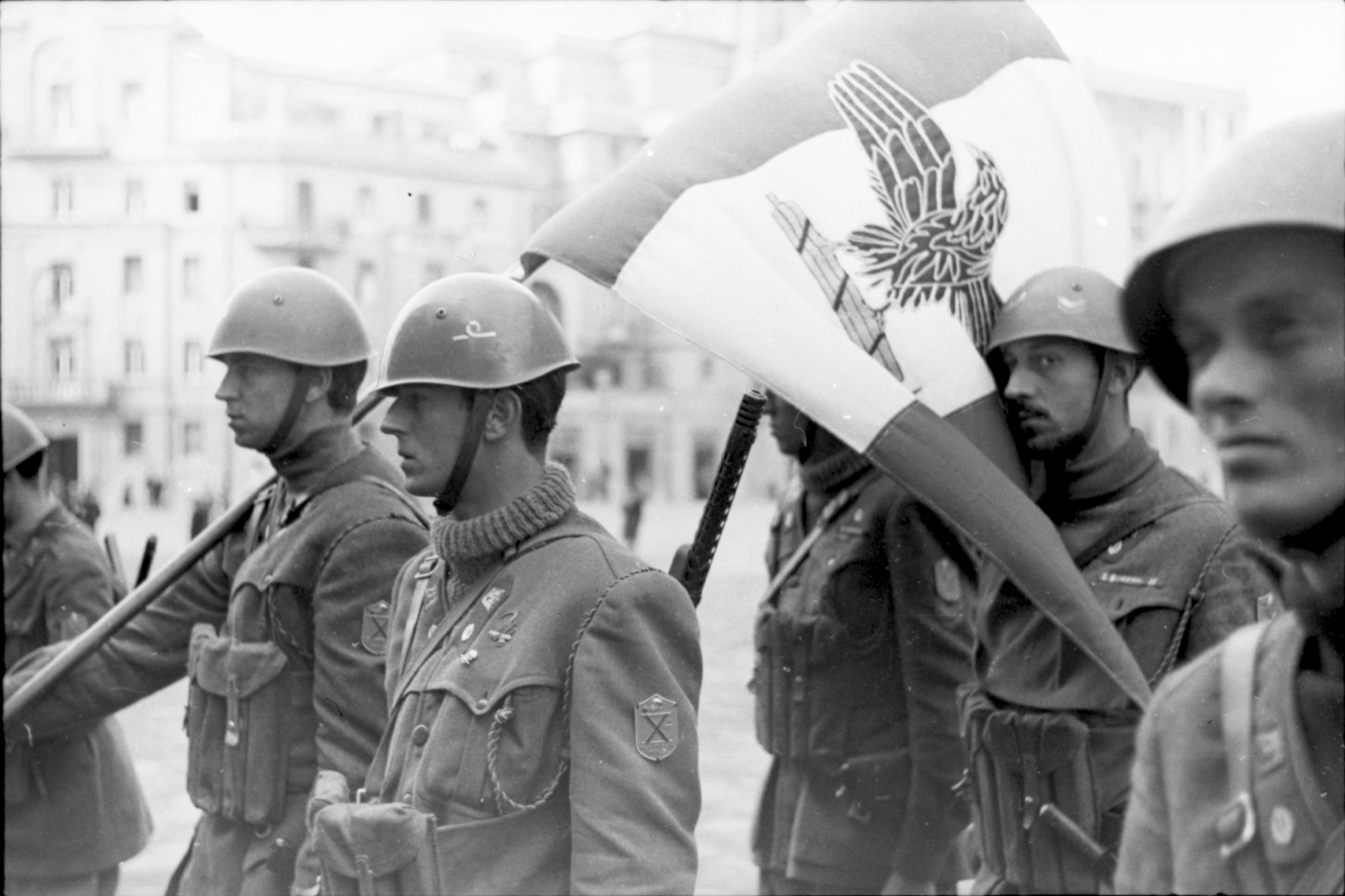
Xª MAS naval infantry at an inspection parade in Rome, March 1944

The majority of the Regia Marina's fleet was initially interned in Malta. The two modern battleships, Italia (previously Littorio) and Vittorio Veneto, were moved to Egyptian waters and played no further part in the war. The rest of the fleet formed the Italian Co-belligerent Navy, and was employed mostly on convoy duty or transporting troops and supplies, with the older battleships used for training. The RSI's navy, the Marina Nazionale Repubblicana was comparatively small, consisting mostly of torpedo boats, MAS motorboats and midget submarines. The Commander of Decima Flottiglia MAS, Junio Valerio Borghese, rebuilt the naval special forces unit post-Armistice to fight for the Axis, operating initially under Kriegsmarine command, and often referred to as Xª MAS. It was nominally part of the RSI navy, but in practice an independent force controlled by Borghese that largely fought on land as naval infantry. Some Xª MAS infantry saw action against the Allies, from whom it earned what Jowett called a "grudging admiration", but the force was mostly deployed against partisans.

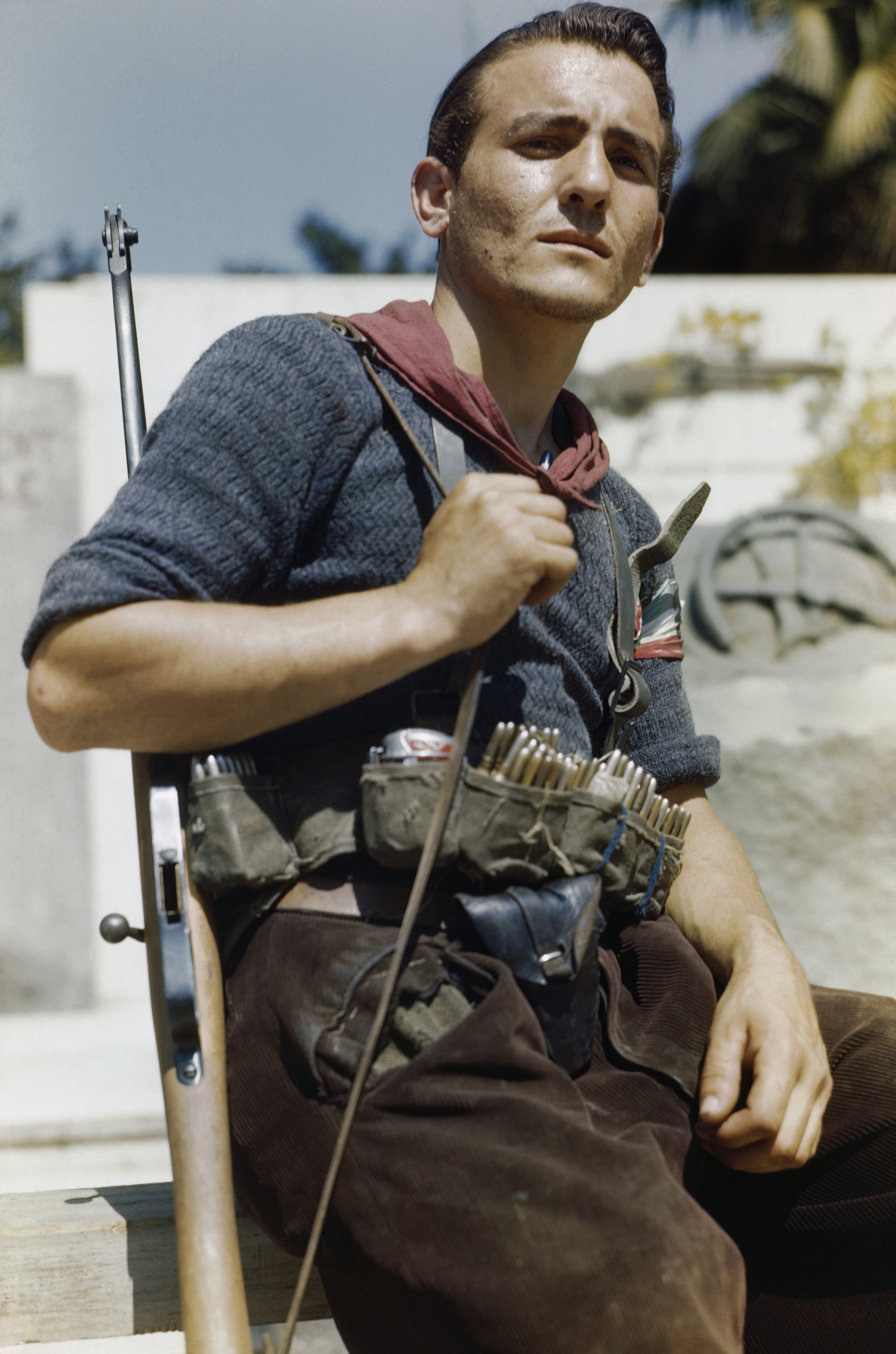
An Italian partisan in Florence, August 1944

The other major combat force in the civil war was the large Italian resistance movement located in central and northern Italy, which fought against the German and RSI forces. The first Partisans were mostly Italian military personnel who avoided capture in the September 1943 German invasion, and began fighting a guerrilla war. They were joined by civilians, escaped Allied POWs and agents from the Office of Strategic Services (OSS) and Special Operations Executive (SOE). While the resistance spanned anti-fascists from a wide political spectrum, as well as the apolitical, there was a preponderance of communists and socialists. In May 1944, General Alexander, commander of Allied 15th Army Group, estimated six Axis divisions in northern Italy were tied up fighting partisan groups.

The summer and autumn of 1944 saw a number of partisan republics established, which briefly operated free of Axis control, but all were over-run within weeks or months of establishment. It has been estimated that by spring 1945, around 300,000 people were fighting with the partisan forces.

=== Allied advance and liberation of Italy ===
Allied progress on the Italian mainland was slow and difficult, with the mountainous terrain, fast-flowing rivers and the narrow peninsula all favouring the defender. Axis forces were able to retreat from one fortified line to the next, the strongest south of Rome being the Winter Line, where heavy fighting took place.

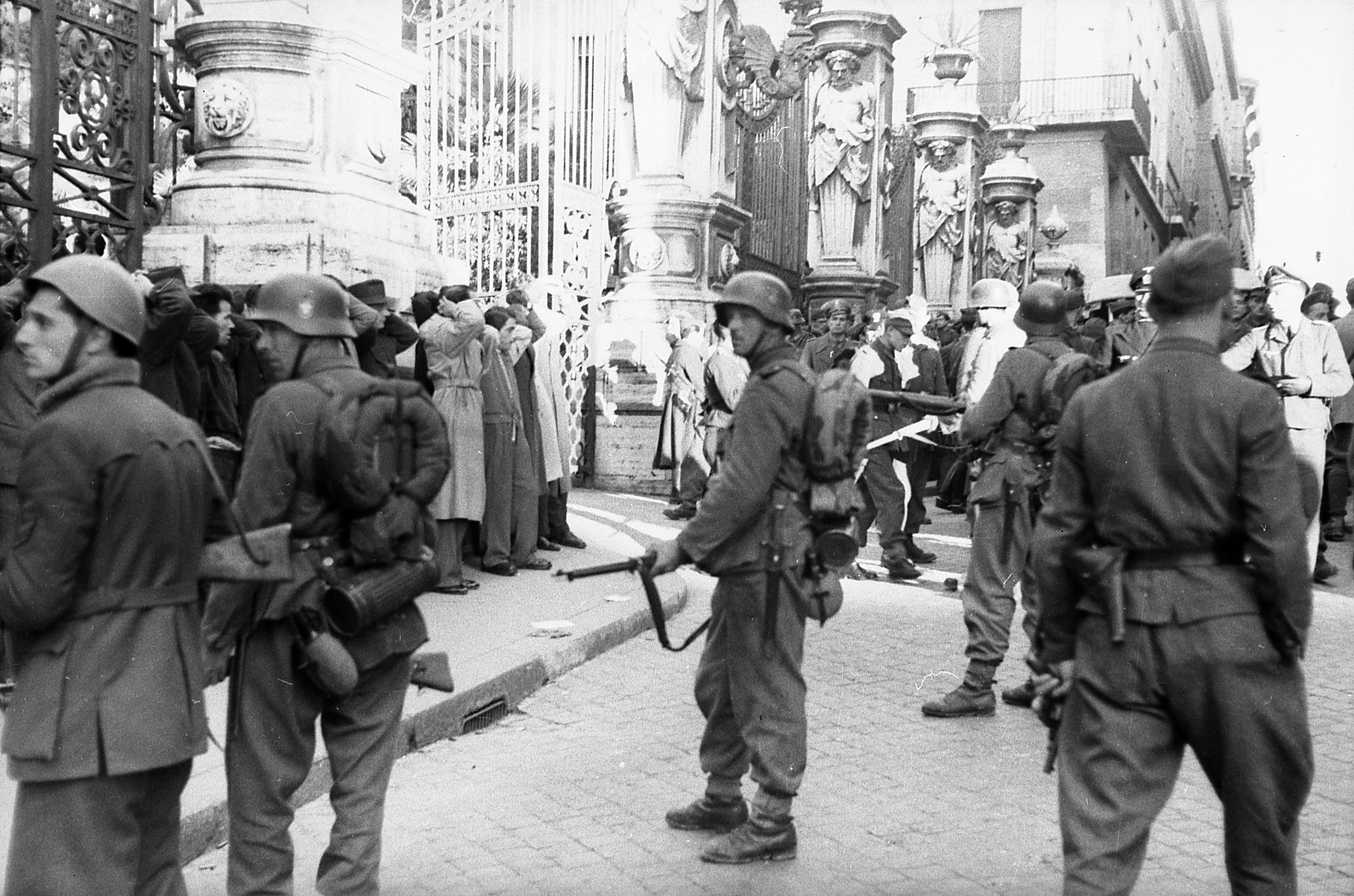
German and RSI soldiers round up civilians in front of the Palazzo Barberini, Rome, in March 1944

As the Allied advance drew nearer to Rome, resistance activity in the city intensified. One of the biggest partisan attacks in the capital happened on Via Rasella on 23 March 1944. A company of SS Police Regiment Bozen, around 156 fully-armed military policemen, were marching down Via Rasella (at the same time they did every day) when ten kilos of dynamite hidden in a street cleaner's cart exploded. Then a dozen partisans of the Gruppo d'Azione Patriottica (Patriotic Action Group) attacked with small arms and hand grenades, leaving 33 of the SS gendarmes dead and 100 wounded. The Germans responded with the Ardeatine massacre, where 335 Italian prisoners (75 of whom were Jewish) were murdered.

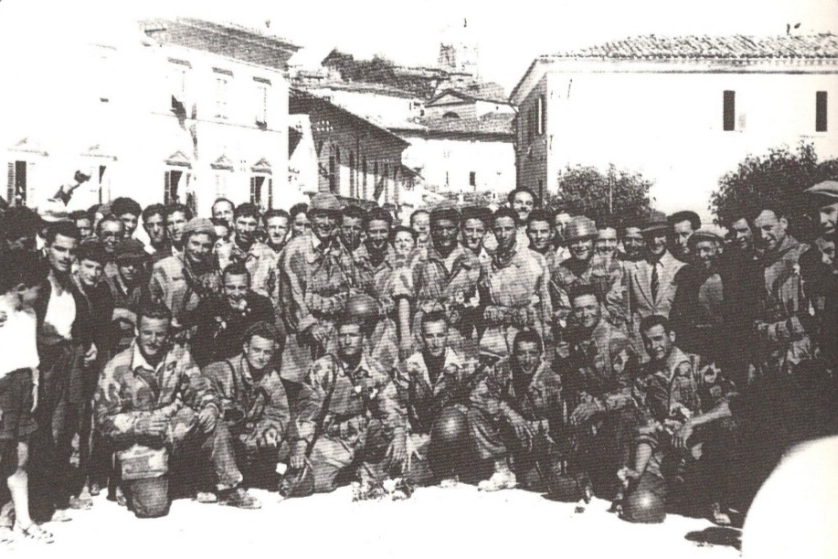
Co-belligerent paratroopers after the liberation of Sarnano in June 1944

Following protracted fighting at the Battle of Monte Cassino and the Battle of Anzio (where Italian Waffen-SS and some RSI troops saw action), the Allies broke through and took Rome on 4 June 1944, two days before the Normandy landings in France. At the Battle of Ancona (16 June–18 July 1944), the Co-belligerent IX Assault Unit achieved an important breakthrough at Osimo, although Ancona was for the most part a Polish victory. The Axis forces then retreated to the heavily fortified Gothic Line, where the Allied advance was again reduced to a crawl.

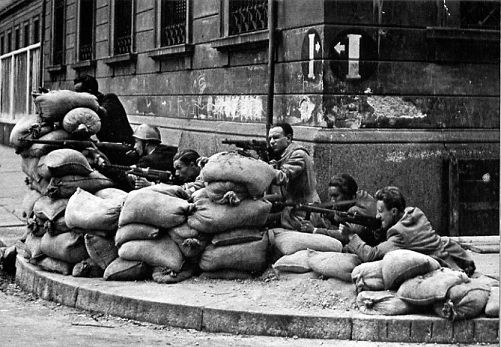
Italian partisans in Milan during the final insurrection leading to the liberation of Italy in April 1945

The final and total Allied victory over the Axis in Italy was secured by the spring offensive of 1945. Between 9 April and 21 April, the Co-belligerent army’s Combat Group Friuli and the partisans were part of a multinational Allied force that fought the Battle of Bologna, liberating the city alongside British, Gurkha, Polish and South African troops – with the Polish first into the city, greeted by partisans. On 25 April, the umbrella organisation for the partisan groups in the north, the National Liberation Committee for Northern Italy, declared a general insurrection, and as a result several important cities were liberated by resistance fighters before Allied troops arrived, including Genoa, Milan and Turin. Consequently, 25 April is now a national holiday in Italy. Mussolini was captured and killed on 28 April 1945 by partisans while attempting to flee. The surrender of Axis forces in Italy occurred on 2 May, shortly before Germany finally surrendered ending World War II in Europe on 8 May.

== The Legacy of the war ==
=== Casualties and Aftermath ===
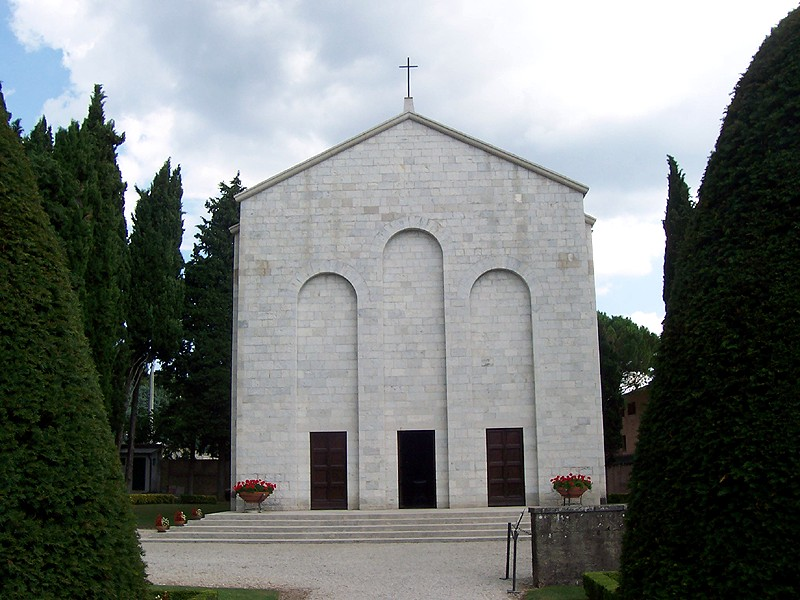
The Mausoleum of the 40 Martyrs in Gubbio was built in memory of 40 Italian civilians executed by German soldiers in reprisal for a partisan attack in June 1944

Estimates based on government data suggest the following military losses (killed and missing) for Italy in World War II (1940–1945):

- Total military dead and missing from 1940 to 1945: 291,376.
  - Losses prior to the Armistice of Cassibile in September 1943: 204,074.
  - The worst year for killed and missing was 1943: 106,994.

The 1947 Treaty of Peace with Italy spelled the end of the Italian colonial empire, saw the Dodecanese Islands handed over to Greece and border territories ceded to France and Yugoslavia. Italy also paid war reparations to Albania, Ethiopia, Greece, the USSR and Yugoslavia. The National Fascist Party and the Republican Fascist Party are banned in Italy. In the 1946 Italian constitutional referendum, the monarchy was abolished, in part due to public anger at the King and establishment figures for fleeing Rome in September 1943 as German troops converged on the city.

The Kingdom of Italy's Co-belligerent status meant that senior Fascists and military leaders did not face an Allied war crimes tribunal (where the judges came from Allied nations), as occurred in Germany and Japan, and instead were tried before Italian courts. In June 1946, the Italian government announced the Togliatti amnesty, which pardoned or reduced sentences for many war criminals below senior level.

=== The Myth of Italiani brava gente ===
In the post-war decades, a popular narrative emerged in Italy known as Italiani brava gente (Italians, the good people), which presented Italy's soldiers as having acted with humanity during World War II, in contrast to the brutality of many other Axis servicemen. The narrative distanced Italy from Axis war crimes, and drew attention to incidents of some Jews being protected from the Holocaust. However, historians now view Italiani brava gente as a myth based on selective use of evidence and distortions of the truth.

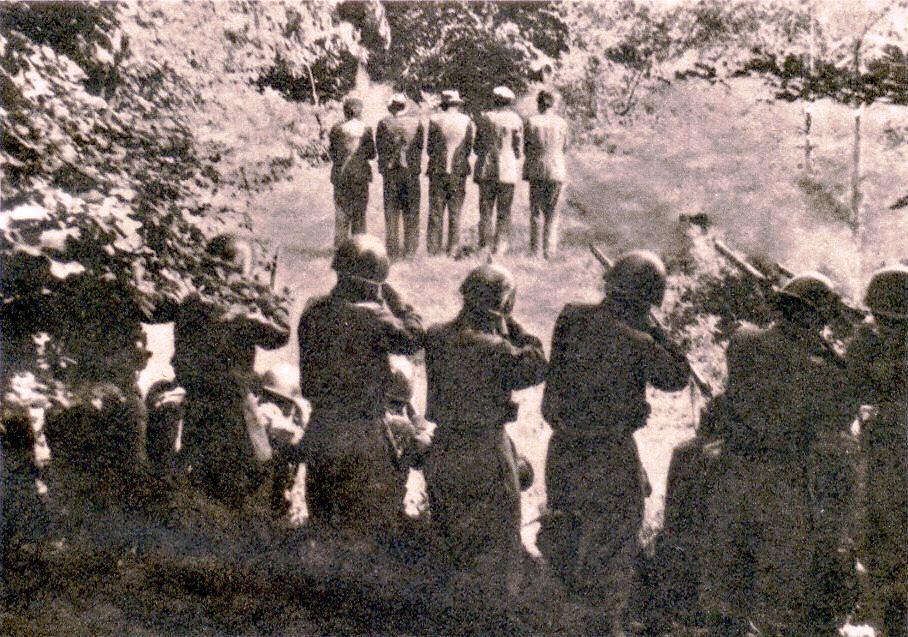
Italian soldiers shooting civilian hostages in Slovenia

Prior to the September 1943 German invasion, the Italian Jewish community had faced legalised discrimination, but Italy refused to deport Jews to the Third Reich. There were also examples of the Italian army opposing deportations of Jews from their occupied zones in France and the Balkans. However, it has been suggested the army officers involved were chiefly acting to defend Italian prestige by thwarting German attempts to interfere in their occupation areas. Goeschel wrote, "These [Italian] officials also believed their refusal to hand over the Jews to the Nazis would stand them in good stead with the Allies, who, they thought, were going to win the war". The Italian 8th Army in the Soviet Union did handover Jews to the SS. Moreover, Italy carried out many war crimes in the Balkans.

In the aftermath of the German invasion in 1943, the SS, aided by RSI officials and local informants, rounded up and deported Italian Jews to extermination camps in eastern Europe. In November 1943, the Republican Fascists at a congress in Verona declared Italian Jews were foreign enemies.

=== Historiography and perceptions ===
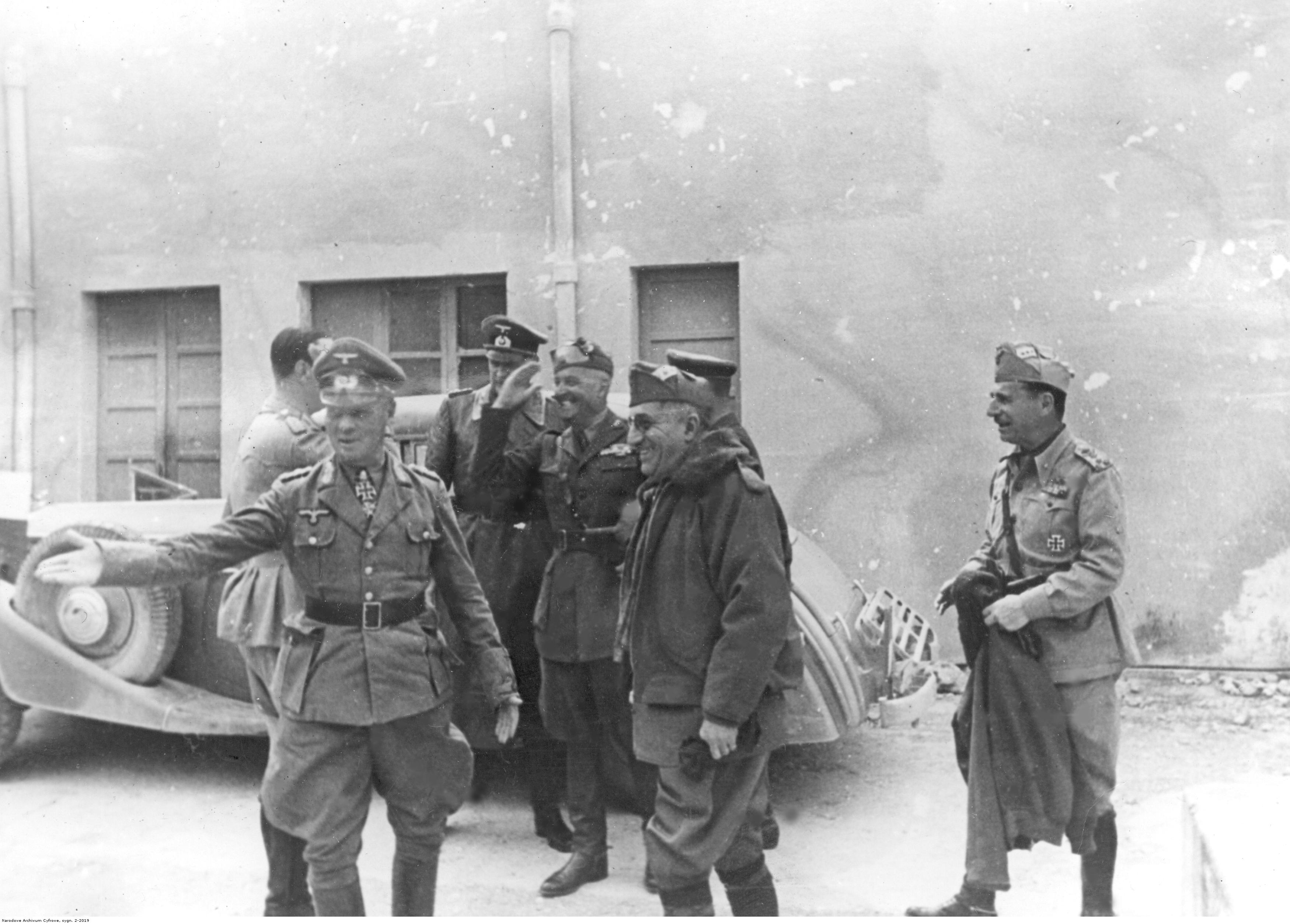
Generals (later Marshals) Ugo Cavallero (centre) and Ettore Bastico (right) meet with Erwin Rommel.

The destruction of the Italian 10th Army by a significantly smaller British force during Operation Compass left a lasting impression that shaped public attitudes in Britain and its Commonwealth long after the war ended, promoting a popular culture stereotype of an Italian soldier who quickly surrendered. Many histories of the North African campaign written in the immediate decades after the Second World War over-emphasised the role of Erwin Rommel, and downplayed the Italian contribution.

While there is no disputing Italy suffered several heavy defeats in World War II, in recent decades it has become more common for historians to present the Italian soldier as someone who was plunged into bad situations, with obsolescent equipment and inadequate logistics; and certainly not as lacking personal courage. Ian Walker has drawn attention to the important role played by Italian armoured divisions during the North African campaign. The majority of the troops in Rommel’s Panzerarmee Afrika were Italians. The Alpini and Bersaglieri fought with distinction throughout the war, drawing respect from enemies and allies. Gerhard Weinberg said in a lecture on myths of World War II that "there is far too much denigration of the performance of Italy's forces during the conflict".

== Assessment ==
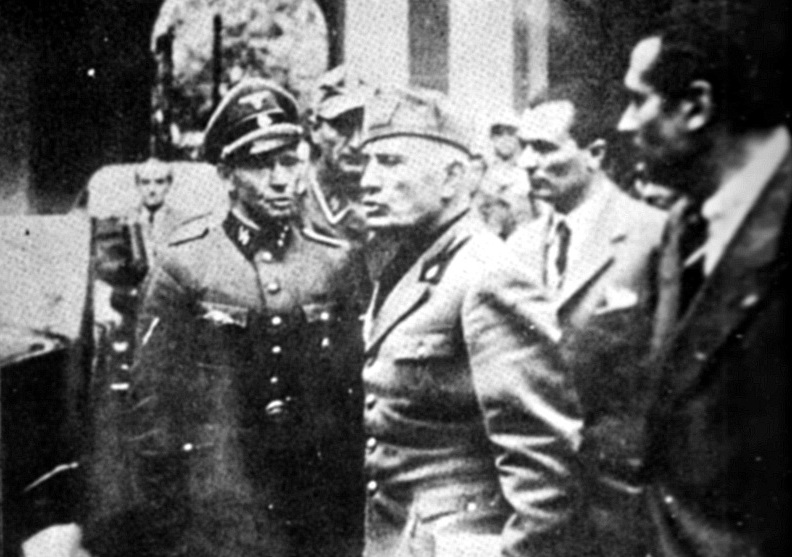
Mussolini in Milan on the afternoon of 25 April 1945 — thought to be the last photograph of him alive

Much of the responsibility for Fascist Italy's defeat in World War II rests with Mussolini. The Duce entered the war for opportunistic reasons, despite having been repeatedly warned the armed forces were not ready. Mussolini overestimated at times what was realistically achievable, which led to Italian forces being sent poorly equipped into situations where failure was likely. Italy's military strength was dispersed by fighting on many fronts, some of which were far flung from the logistical hub of the Italian mainland. General Giuseppe Castellano, who signed the armistice with the Allies in 1943, wrote of Mussolini: "the errors were essentially of a political nature and many times the military were thrust into more dangerous adventures through the incompetence and intemperance of the man who ran the government". Gooch concluded: "Mussolini had little if any comprehension of military strategy and none at all of grand strategy."

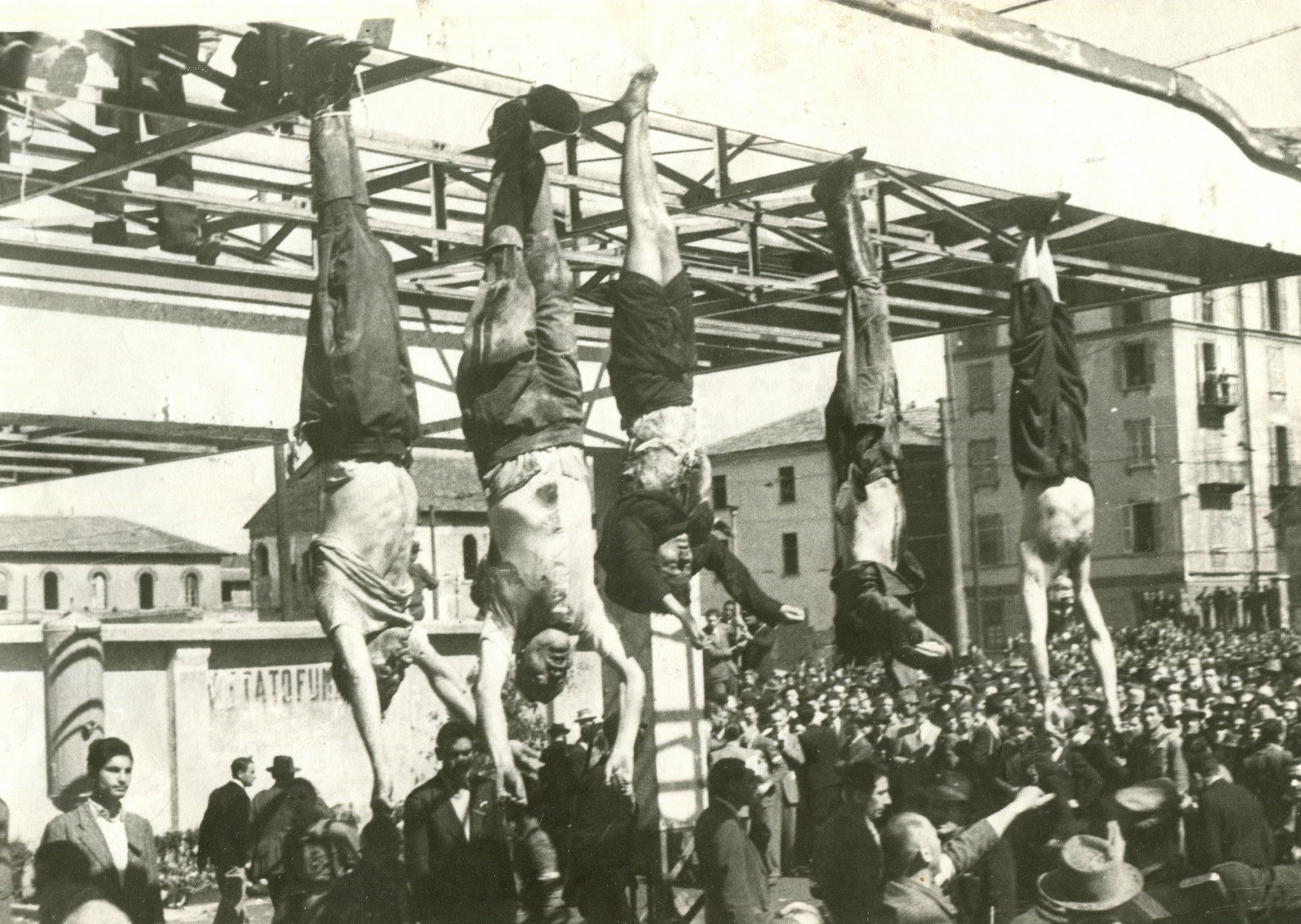
Following their execution by the resistance, the bodies of Mussolini (second from left) and his mistress Clara Petacci (centre) were taken to Piazzale Loreto, Milan, and hung from the roof of a petrol station

However, Italy's military establishment must take their share of the responsibility. According to Battistelli, the military's rigid lines of authority meant initiative taking by middle ranking and junior officers was not encouraged, and granting units operational freedom was frowned upon by the army high command. Senior officers frequently failed to press home objections when Mussolini proposed unrealistic schemes. Modernisation often occurred at a slow pace, in part due to a culture of conservatism. Interservice co-operation was inadequate. Many troops were poorly trained and not enough effort was invested in improving the quality of junior officers.

Historians also attribute the military's defeats to poor equipment and shortages. In 1940, although the navy had been modernised, the army and air force had a lot of obsolescent equipment. Some tanks and aircraft were "a whole generation outdated" by those used by the Allies, and when better weapons were eventually produced they often arrived too late in the war and too few in number to turn the tide. Moreover, Italian forces suffered shortages of a wide range of relatively basic equipment (even boots and winter uniforms) and Italy's smaller industrial sector hampered ramping up production.

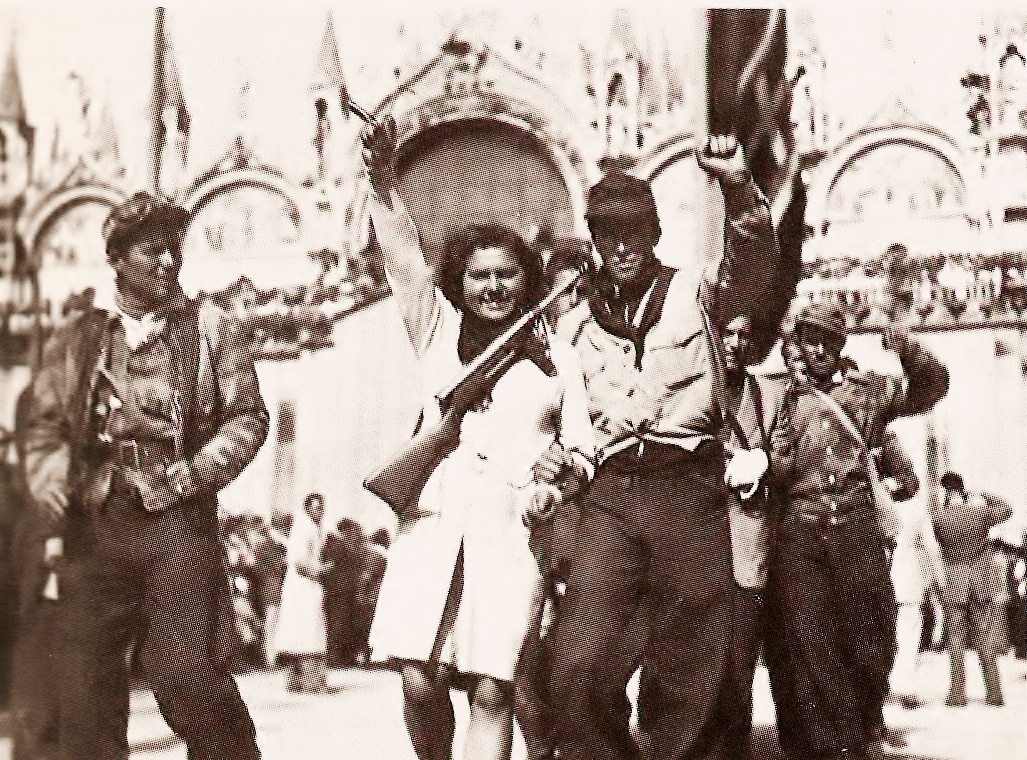
Italian partisans celebrate the liberation of Venice in Piazza San Marco.

Mussolini's regime failed to manage the economy so it supported the war effort. There was never a plan for distributing manpower between the military and major industries, resulting in a surplus of agricultural labour in the south while there was a shortage in the north. Factories struggled to find skilled workers. During the war, there was only a marginal rise in the proportion of women working in industry.

While Fascist Italy was defeated in World War II, the Co-belligerent forces and the Resistance were among the victors at the end of the conflict. The Resistance typically draws respect from historians for its contribution to the defeat of the Axis. Tom Behan wrote: "The historical record shows that the Italian Resistance was an inspiring story, in which a largely inexperienced movement took on vastly superior military and economic forces, often making their ability to rule over large swathes of the country impossible".

== See also ==
- Italian Army equipment in World War II
- Mediterranean and Middle East theatre of World War II

== Bibliography ==
- Athanassiou, Phoebus (2025). Partisan Warfare in Greece 1941–44. Oxford: Osprey Publishing. ISBN 9781472867537.
- Badoglio, Pietro (1946). L'Italia nella seconda guerra mondiale [Italy in the Second World War] (in Italian). Milan: Mondadori.
- Battistelli, Pier Paolo (2021). The Balkans 1940-41 (Vol.1): Mussolini's fatal blunder in the Greco-Italian War. Oxford: Osprey Publishing. ISBN 9781472842572.
- Battistelli, Pier Paolo (2021). The Balkans 1940-41 (Vol.2): Hitler's Blitzkrieg against Yugoslavia and Greece. Oxford: Osprey Publishing. ISBN 9781472842619.
- Battistelli, Pier Paolo (2024). East Africa Campaign 1940-41: The Battle for the Horn of Africa. Oxford: Osprey Publishing. ISBN 9781472860712.
- Battistelli, Pier Paolo (2011). Italian Army Elite Units and Special Forces 1940-43. Oxford: Osprey Publishing. ISBN 9781849088954.
- Battistelli, Pier Paolo; Crociani, Peiro (2013). Italian Navy & Air Force Elite Units and Special Forces 1940-45. Oxford: Osprey Publishing. ISBN 9781849088572.
- Battistelli, Pier Paolo; Crociani, Peiro (2015). World War II Italian Partisan Warfare in Italy. Oxford: Osprey Publishing. ISBN 9781472808936.
- Battistelli, Pier Paolo (2025). Yugoslavia 1941-44: Anti-partisan operations. Oxford: Osprey Publishing. ISBN 9781472865373.
- Behan, Tom (2006). The Italian Resistance: Fascists, Guerrillas and the Allies. London: Pluto Press. ISBN 0-7538-2165-6.
- Bell, P. M. H. (1997) [1986]. The Origins of the Second World War in Europe (2nd ed.). London: Pearson. ISBN 978-0-582-30470-3.
- Bierman, John; Smith, Colin (2003) [2002]. War without Hate: The Desert Campaign of 1940–1943. New York: Penguin. ISBN 978-0-14-200394-7.
- Cappellani, Filippo; Battistelli, Pier Paolo (2012). Italian Medium Tanks, 1939-45. Oxford: Osprey Publishing. ISBN 9781849087759.
- Ceva, Lucio (1990). "The North African Campaign 1940-43: A Reconsideration". Journal of Strategic Studies. 13 (1): 84–104.
- Ford, Ken (2010). Operation Crusader 1941: Rommel in Retreat. Oxford: Osprey Publishing. ISBN 9781846035005.
- Glei, Dana A., Bruzzone, Silvia & Castelli, Graziella. "Effects of war losses on mortality estimates for Italy: a first attempt." Demographic Research Vol.13, Article 15 (2005): 363–388. Link: https://www.demographic-research.org/volumes/vol13/15/13-15.pdf
- Goeschel, Christian (2018). Mussolini and Hitler: The forging of the fascist alliance. New Haven: Yale University Press. ISBN 978-0-300-17883-8.
- Gooch, John (2020). Mussolini's War: Fascist Italy from triumph to collapse, 1935-1943. Dublin: Penguin Books. ISBN 978-0-141-98029-4.
- Holland, James (2008). Italy's Sorrow: A Year of War 1944-1945. London: Harper Press. ISBN 978-0-00-717645-8.
- Holland, James (2020). Sicily '43: The first assault on fortress Europe. London: Penguin Random House. ISBN 978-1-473-57429-8.
- Holmes, Tony (2021). World War II Fighter Planes Spotter's Guide. Oxford: Osprey Publishing. ISBN 9781472848505.
- Jowett, Philip (2001). The Italian Army, 1940-45 (3): Italy 1943-45. Oxford: Osprey Publishing. ISBN 978-1-85532-866-2.
- Keegan, John (1989). The Second World War. London: Pimlico. ISBN 9780712673488.
- Klein, Shira (2021). "Italian Society during World War II". In Paul R. Bartrop (ed.). The Routledge History of the Second World War. Routledge.
- Konstam, Angus (2023). Cape Matapan 1941: Cunningham's Mediterranean Triumph. Oxford: Osprey Publishing. ISBN 978-1-4728-5723-1.
- Konstam, Angus (2025). Second Sirte 1942: The Desperate Battle to Relieve Malta. Oxford: Osprey Publishing. ISBN 978-1-4728-6722-3.
- Latimer, Jon (2000). Operation Compass 1940: Wavell's whirlwind offensive. Oxford: Osprey Publishing. ISBN 9781855329676.
- Macksey, Kenneth J. (1972). Tank Warfare: A History of Tanks in Battle. New York: Stein and Day. ISBN 9780812814491.
- Massimello, Giovanni; Apostolo, Giorgio (2000). Italian Aces of World War 2. Oxford: Osprey Publishing. ISBN 9781841760780.
- Murphy, W. E. (1961). Official History of New Zealand in the Second World War 1939–45: The Relief of Tobruk. Wellington: Historical Publications Branch.
- O'Hara, Vincent P.; Cernuschi, Enrico (2009). Dark Navy: The Regina Marina and the Armistice of 8 September 1943. Ann Arbor: Nimble Books. ISBN 978-1-934840-91-7.
- O'Hara, Vincent P. (2009). Struggle for the Middle Sea: The Great Navies at War in the Mediterranean 1940–1945. London: Conway. ISBN 978-1-84486-102-6.
- O'Reilly, Charles T. (2001). Forgotten Battles: Italy's War of Liberation. Lanham: Lexington Books. ISBN 0-7391-0195-1.
- Pitt, Barrie (1980). Crucible of War (Vol.1): Wavell's Command. London: Jonathan Cape. ISBN 9781082248351.
- Quartermaine, Luisa (2000). Mussolini's Last Republic: Propaganda and Politics in the Italian Social Republic (R.S.I.) 1943–45. Elm Bank modern language studies. Intellect Books. ISBN 1-902454-08-1.
- Rogers, Anthony (2019). Kos and Leros 1943: The German Conquest of the Dodecanese. Oxford: Osprey Publishing. ISBN 9781472835109.
- Soboski, Marek (2022). BETASOM: Italian Submarines in the Battle of the Atlantic, 1940-1945. Zielona Góra: Ikona. ISBN 9798367072143.
- Soboski, Marek (2021). Mussolini's Eastern Crusade: The Italian Expeditionary Corps in Operation Barbarossa. Zielona Góra: Ikona. ISBN 979-8480926569.
- Steinberg, Jonathan (1990). All Or Nothing: The Axis and the Holocaust, 1941–1943. Routledge. ISBN 0-415-07142-9.
- Walker, Ian W. (2003). Iron Hulls, Iron Hearts: Mussolini's Elite Armoured Divisions in North Africa. Ramsbury: The Crowood Press. ISBN 1-86126-646-4.
- Weinberg, Gerhard L. (2011). "Some myths about World War II" (PDF). The Journal of Military History. 75 (3): 701–718.
- Weinberg, Gerhard L. (1994). A World at Arms: A Global History of World War II. Cambridge University Press. ISBN 0-521-44317-2.
- Zabecki, David T. (1999). World War II in Europe: An Encyclopedia. Taylor & Francis. ISBN 0-8240-7029-1.
