= Reggiane Re.2006 =

Italian fighter prototype

Re.2006
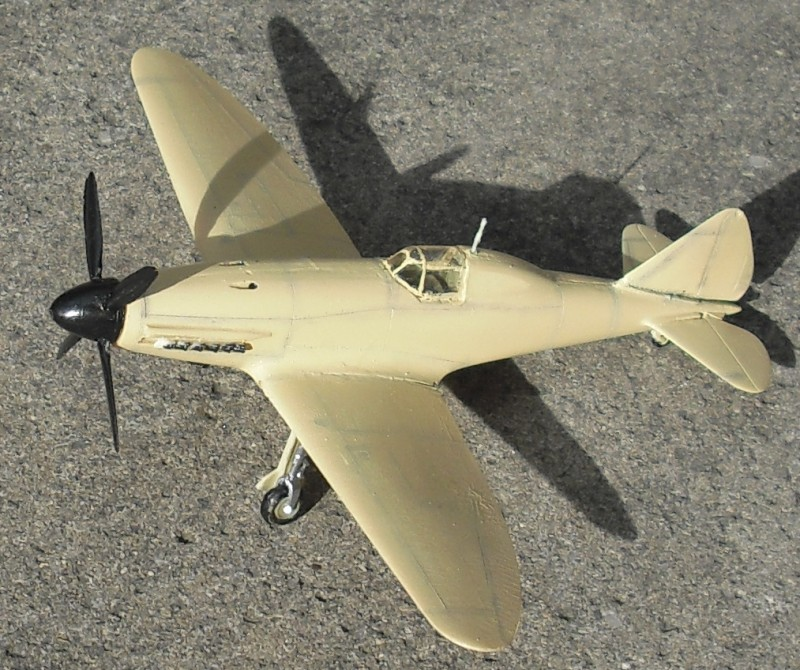
- A model of the Re.2006

General information
- Type: Fighter aircraft
- National origin: Italy
- Manufacturer: Reggiane
- Status: Abandoned
- Number built: 1

History
- Manufactured: 1943
- Developed from: Re.2005

The Reggiane Re.2006 was an Italian fighter aircraft, of which only one prototype was built.

== Development ==
In 1943, Reggiane started work on a version of the Re.2005 that was powered by a Daimler-Benz DB 603. After the bombing of the Reggiane plants in Reggio Emilia, the development team was able to move to Correggio along with some of the finished parts, which were hidden in a high school. They completed the construction of the prototype (without the engine), however, it was not handed over to the Luftwaffe. The project was kept secret and no information was disclosed to the public.

== Aircraft on display ==
In 1946, the Royal Air Force studied the Re.2006, but it was of little of value and was destroyed, having never flown. However, a part of the landing gear survived and is displayed at Museo Nazionale Scienza e Tecnologia Leonardo da Vinci.

== See also ==
Related development

- Re.2000
- Re.2001
- Re.2002
- Re.2003
- Re.2004
- Re.2005
- Re.2007

== Bibliography ==
- Caliaro, Lugino (2025). Reggiane Fighters. Crécy Publishing. ISBN 978-1-80035-352-7.
- Longhi, Roberto (n.d.). "Reggiane and I... a Fighter Designer Recalls". Air Enthusiast Quarterly (2): 214–224. ISSN 0143-5450.
