= Reggiane Re.2001 Falco II =

Italian fighter aircraft from WW2

Re.2001 Falco II

General information
- Type: Fighter-bomber, night fighter
- National origin: Italy
- Manufacturer: Reggiane
- Designer: Roberto Longhi & Antonio Alessi
- Primary users: Regia Aeronautica Aeronautica Nazionale Repubblicana
- Number built: 237

History
- Introduction date: 1941
- First flight: June 1940
- Retired: 1945
- Developed from: Reggiane Re.2000
- Variants: Reggiane Re.2002; Reggiane Re.2005; Reggiane Re.2006

The Reggiane Re.2001 Falco II was an Italian fighter aircraft, serving in the Regia Aeronautica (Italian Air Force) during World War II. A contemporary of the renowned Macchi C.202, the production of this type was to be limited to only 252 aircraft, but it was a flexible design that proved to be able to undertake a number of roles. Possessing a relatively high level of maneuverability, the Re.2001 could effectively dogfight against various contemporary fighters, such as the Supermarine Spitfire. The Re.2001 became the basis of a later, more formidable fighter, the Re.2005.

== Design and development ==
The Reggiane Re.2001 was a development of the Re.2000 Falco I which had been rejected by the Regia Aeronautica primarily because of its unprotected fuel tanks in the wing, which were merely sealed voids between the spars, and secondly its engine. This was the main problem the Falco II set out to fix, now having a 1,175 hp (876 kW) Alfa Romeo inline engine (a more powerful and reliable license-built German DB 601) rather than a 986 hp (735 kW) Piaggio P.XI radial engine.

Incorporating much of the Re.2000's fuselage structure, even retaining the entire tail unit, the Re.2001's wings were of semi-elliptical design with three spars in each wing. The initial design had conventional fuel tanks with 544 L (120 imp gal; 144 US gal) total capacity (five tanks, one in the fuselage and the others in the wings). The armament consisted of Breda-SAFAT machine guns, with two nose-mounted 12.7 mm (0.50 in) (up to 800 rounds) and two 7.7 mm (0.303 in) guns in the wings, (1200 rounds total).

The new Falco II was equal to the Macchi MC.202, but the Macchi fighter, having first call on production for the Alfa Romeo R.A.1000RC.41-1a (the license built DB 601) was still produced in greater numbers. The Re.2001 was then delayed because the Regia Aeronautica insisted on the fuel tanks being placed inside the wings, which required a substantial redesign of the wing structure. The first order, amounting to 300 machines, was cut back with only 252 produced. This number included 100 Re.2001 Serie I, Serie II and Serie III with armament variations, the Reggiane Serie IV fighter-bomber and 150 Re.2001 CN Caccia Notturna, night fighter.

Due to the wing redesign coupled with production delays, the first production aircraft were finally cleared for operational use in June 1941, nearly a year behind schedule.

Along with the fighter variant, two other main variants were developed to suit specialized roles. The Re.2001 CB (Cacciabombardiere, Fighter-bomber) version produced from 1942 could carry a 100 or 250 kg (220 or 550 lb) bomb under the fuselage for the attack role. The CN (Caccia notturno, Night fighter) version was adapted with the introduction of engine exhaust-flame dampers and a 20 mm (0.79 in) Mauser MG 151/20 cannon in two gondolas, one under each wing, although many fighters retained the original armament. A total of 34 CNs were produced of the 50 ordered.

== Operational history ==
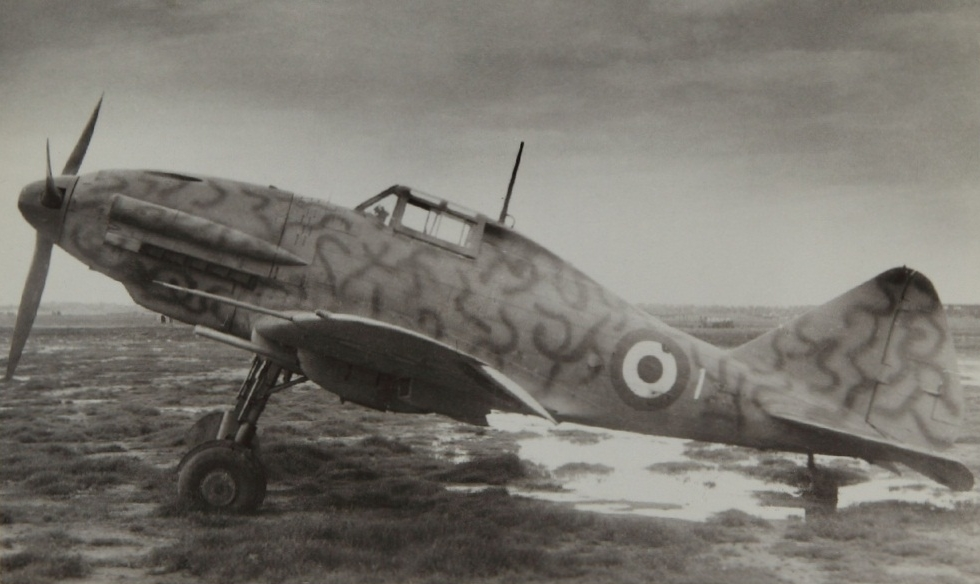
Reggiane Re.2001

The Re.2001 reached operational status late in 1941 with 2° Gruppo (part of 6° Stormo) that had returned from North Africa without aircraft in September 1941. Its three Squadriglie, 150ª, 152ª and 358ª, were based at Gorizia and then moved to Rome-Ciampino in December. For technical reasons the unit was not fully equipped and trained until February 1942. On 4 May 1942, it moved to Caltagirone, in Sicily, with 18 Reggianes, under the command of Colonnello Bajlon. In May 1942, Re.2001s began to fly escort missions over Malta, encountering British Spitfire Mk Vs. On 12 May, 15 Reggiane 2001s of 2° Gruppo, while escorting (with Macchi MC.200s) three Savoia-Marchetti SM.84 of 4° Gruppo, were attacked by nine Spitfires. The Spitfires shot down a bomber and badly damaged the other but the Reggiane pilots quickly reacted and shot down the two Spitfires, one by Sergente Paolo Morcino, that had to make a crash-landing (just like his commander) close to Ispica, as his undercarriage had been damaged by a 20 mm cannon shell.

That day the RAF lost three Spitfires, one pilot, Sergeant Charles Graysmark of 601 Squadron was killed and another, Sergeant Cyril 'Joe' Bush of (126 Squadron), wounded. Pilot Officer Michael Graves, 126 Squadron, was also shot down but bailed out uninjured. In the afternoon of 15 May 1942, 19 Re.2001s flew to the airfields at Malta on a hunting spree. Dogfights took place over the southern part of the island and according to the Italians, the Allies lost four aircraft, three falling into the sea east of Valletta and the fourth, south of Kalafrana. Re.2001 MM.7210, hit during the dogfight, made an emergency landing at Comiso, in Sicily. On 18 May, eight Re.2001s led by Tenente Remo Cazzolli of 152ª Squadriglia flew to Malta in support of a maritime/land reconnaissance of the island. The Re.2001s were attacked by four Spitfires of 249 Squadron, three pilots each claiming a Reggiane. Later records show that Cazzolli, a Spanish Civil War veteran, was the lone victim, crashing north of Fort San Leonardo, near Marsaskala, and was captured. The remains of his aircraft were found buried amongst other aircraft underneath the St Vincent De Paule elderly home in March 2023. The aircraft were found by accident during excavation works to build a new fountain. It is thought that during WWII the area was a quarry, and after the British inspected downed planes for an insight into the technology, they dumped these aircraft into this quarry and buried them, to be found so many years later. In September 2026 the Malta Aviation Museum inaugurated a new exhibition centred around the preserved remains of this aircraft, which is the only surviving example as of 2026.

By the end of June, 22° Gruppo based at Rome-Ciampino received their first Re.2001 CBs and redeployed to Monserrato, Sardinia. They were later transferred to Sicily to participate in the raids on Malta. On 12 July, over Malta, Canadian ace "Buzz" Beurling from 249 Sqn shot down the Reggiane Re.2001s of Tenente Colonnello Aldo Quarantotti and Tenente Carlo Seganti, of 150ª Squadriglia Caccia, mistaking them for Macchi C.202s. But two days later, he was in turn badly shot up by Reggianes. Beurling's aircraft was "riddled by better than 20 bullets through the fuselage and wings". "An explosive bullet nicked my right heel", he recalled. Generally slower than contemporary fighters, still the Reggiane against the Hawker Hurricane fared better and could take on this opponent on a more equal basis, although the Hawker was noticeably faster at most altitudes. The Spitfire V had an even greater speed advantage. especially above 7,000 m (23,000 ft).

At lower and medium altitudes, the Re.2001 was able to hold its own and, in the hands of an expert pilot, as ace Laddie Lucas recalled in his Malta: The Thorn in Rommel's side, the Reggiane could be a difficult and dangerous opponent for the Spitfire V.

On 13 July 1942, 249 Squadron was engaged high above Malta with a mixed force of German and Italian fighters. Jack Rae, then fast developing into one of New Zealand's outstanding pilots and his able No. 2, the Australian, Alan Yates, despite being low on ammunition, had finally set upon a lone Re.2001 as it was about to disengage and head for Sicily. What then followed gave Jack such a shock that the incident has stuck starkly in his mind for half a century. "To my amazement the Italian proved to be an extremely competent opponent. I had never before been involved in such a complex sequence of aerobatics as I pursued him. Twice I nearly 'spun off' as I stayed with him; I found it difficult to get any sort of worthwhile deflection shot at his aircraft. At times he got dangerously close to getting a bead on me. Eventually he started to smoke and we hit his tail, but we were halfway across the Strait of Sicily and our position was getting dangerous as we were now low in fuel and would be in real difficulty if we were attacked. But, as we turned back to base, the Italian, to my amazement, turned with us and made one final and defiant attack upon our section - as if to show what he thought of a pair of Spitfires!"

On 12 August 1942, two Re.2001G/Vs, each modified to carry a 640 kg (1,410 lb) fragmentation bomb and accompanied by a fighter escort of Re.2001s, carried out an attack on HMS Victorious during Operation Pedestal. Reportedly, the Re.2001s were not challenged because of their similarity in appearance to Sea Hurricanes. During the attack, a direct hit was scored on the aircraft carrier's flight deck but the bomb failed to explode and fell harmlessly into the sea. Beginning in spring 1942, Reggiane Re.2001 CN night fighters were issued to 59° Gruppo, and primarily used in the defence of Italian cities. As the tide of war shifted, the Re.2001 units were constantly moved from base to base, and finally by 10 July 1943, when the invasion of Sicily began, all available Re.2001 fighters were diverted to defend Italy and nearby Mediterranean islands held by Italian forces.

Later in 1943, the fighter in all of its variants was used to defend northern and central Italy. Fighter pilots praised the Re.2001's handling qualities (some considered it more maneuverable than the Macchi C.202); however, like many Italian combat aircraft, the type experienced poor serviceability and many of the units using the Re.2001 were not fully equipped. The complexity of the Re.2001 design led to higher costs (in 1942, the production cost of the Re.2001 was 600,000 lire versus 520,000 lire of the Macchi C.202) and slowed production rates which also limited its effectiveness as a fighter. Due to attrition, only 33 Re.2001s were available at the Armistice of 9 September 1943. Furthermore, poor serviceability meant that only nine Re.2001s survived the division of Italy, eight going to the Italian Co-Belligerent Air Force with the Allies, and one to the Italian Social Republic.

== Variants ==
Re.2001
Prototypes, two built. Second prototype had three-spar wing, modified canopy and fixed tailwheel. First flight in June 1940
Re.2001 Serie I
First production series operated as fighter-bomber and carrier trainer; also used for land-based catapult tests, 100 built.
Re.2001 CB
Modified fighter-bomber produced from 1942, to carry two 100 or 160 kg (220 or 350 lb) bombs under the wings as well as bombs up to 250 kg (550 lb) under the fuselage for the attack role.
Re.2001 OR Serie II
Proposed ship-borne fighter version for the carrier Aquila, 50 built. First addition of wing-mounted machine guns to development and optional cannon, able to carry a 600 kg (1,300 lb) torpedo or bomb as standard.
Re.2001 CN Serie III & IV
Night fighter and fighter-bomber version, 74 built. Optional bombload of up to 640 kg (1,410 lb) or additional fuel tank on Serie IV. Two 20 mm (0.79 in) Mauser MG 151/20 cannon (60 rounds each) were fitted in two gondolas, one under each wing.
Re.2001 G/H
Experimental torpedo fighter (carrying a 600 kg (1,300 lb) torpedo) or anti-tank version with lengthened tailwheel and two 20 mm (0.79 in) cannons, two built.
Re.2001 G/V
Modified fighter-bomber, with reinforced fuselage structure to carry a single 640 kg (1,410 lb) bomb with 120 kg (260 lb) HE, derived from a 381 mm (15.0 in) shell (made for the Littorio-class battleships). A small number of the variant was built; two G/Vs took part in Operation Pedestal but this was the sole use of the variant.

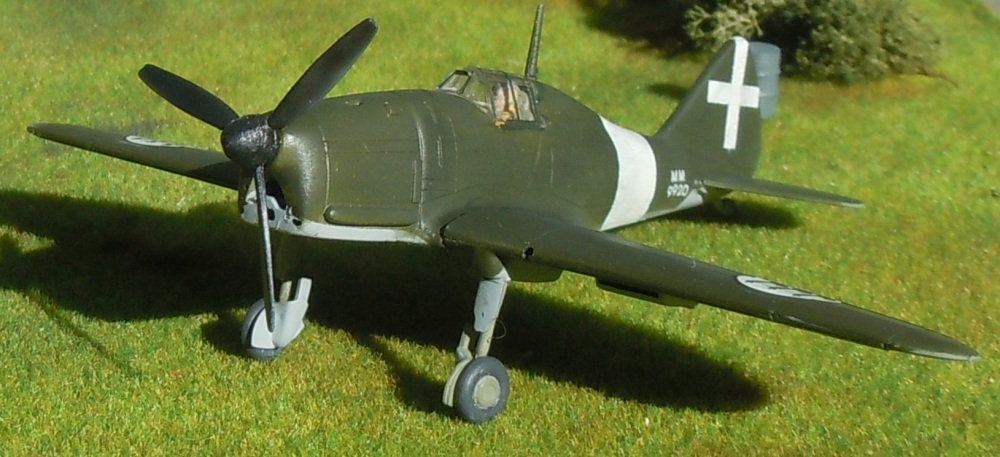
Model of the Re.2001 Delta

Re.2001 Delta
Prototype version powered by 840 hp (630 kW) Isotta Fraschini Delta RC 16/48 engine, one built- first flight: 12 September 1942. After tests when a top speed of only 478 km/h (297 mph) at 5,760 m (18,900 ft) was reached, the Regia Aeronautica cancelled the 100 variants on order.
Re.2001bis
Prototype (MM.438) version with repositioned radiators, one built; although flight trials were successful, proving to be the fastest of the Re.2001 variants, it was converted back to a standard Re.2001.

Other variants were considered including a design for a dedicated anti-tank fighter (armed with 20 mm (0.79 in) guns and anti-tank bomblets) and the Re.2001 Fotografico, a photo-reconnaissance version, although some standard Re.2001s were later modified for this role.

== Operators ==
Kingdom of Italy

- Regia Aeronautica
- Italian Co-Belligerent Air Force operated eight aircraft.

Italian Social Republic

- Aeronautica Nazionale Repubblicana operated one aircraft.

== Specifications (Re.2001 Serie III) ==
Reggiane Re.2001 3-view drawing

Data from

General characteristics

- Crew: 1
- Length: 8.36 m (27 ft 5 in)
- Wingspan: 11 m (36 ft 1 in)
- Height: 3.15 m (10 ft 4 in)
- Wing area: 20.4 m^{2} (220 sq ft)
- Airfoil: N-38
- Empty weight: 2,495 kg (5,501 lb)
- Gross weight: 3,280 kg (7,231 lb)
- Powerplant: 1 × Alfa Romeo R.A.1000 R.C.41-I Monsone V-12 inverted liquid-cooledpiston engine, 864 kW (1,159 hp) (license-built Daimler-Benz DB 601Aa)
- Propellers: 3-bladed constant-speed propeller

Performance

- Maximum speed: 542 km/h (337 mph, 293 kn)
- Range: 1,100 km (680 mi, 590 nmi)
- Service ceiling: 11,000 m (36,000 ft)
- Rate of climb: 13 m/s (2,600 ft/min)
- Wing loading: 160.78 kg/m^{2} (32.93 lb/sq ft)

Armament

- Guns:

- 2 × 12.7 mm (0.50 in) Breda-SAFAT machine guns in upper cowling
- 2 × 7.7 mm (0.303 in) Breda-SAFAT machine guns in wings

== See also ==
Related development

- Reggiane Re.2000
- Reggiane Re.2002
- Reggiane Re.2003
- Reggiane Re.2004
- Reggiane Re.2005
- Reggiane Re.2006
- Reggiane Re.2007

Related lists

- List of aircraft of World War II
- List of aircraft of Italy in World War II
