= Reggiane Re.2000 Falco I =

1939 Italian fighter

Re.2000 Falco I

General information
- Type: Fighter
- National origin: Italy
- Manufacturer: Reggiane
- Designer: Roberto Longhi
- Status: Retired
- Primary users: Regia Aeronautica: Hungarian Air Force; Luftwaffe; Swedish Air Force
- Number built: 186 (+204 Hungarian MÁVAG Héja IIs)

History
- Introduction date: 1940
- First flight: 24 May 1939
- Retired: July 1945 (Swedish Air Force)
- Variants: MÁVAG Héja (Hungarian-made fighter based on the Re.2000); Reggiane Re.2001; Reggiane Re.2002; Reggiane Re.2003; Reggiane Re.2004; Reggiane Re.2005; Reggiane Re.2006; Reggiane Re.2007

The Reggiane Re.2000 Falco I is an Italian all metal, low-wing monoplane developed and manufactured by aircraft company Reggiane. The type was used by the Regia Aeronautica (Italian Air Force) and the Swedish Air Force during the first part of the Second World War.

The Re 2000 was developed by a team headed by aircraft designers Roberto Longhi and Antonio Alessio to be a lightly built and highly maneuverable interceptor/fighter aircraft. The emergent design, which had been designated as the Re 2000 Falco I, was equipped with a Curtiss-Wright-style retractable undercarriage, bore substantial similarities to the American-built Seversky P-35. On 24 May 1939, the prototype performed its maiden flight. Flight testing of the prototype revealed it to be able to outfight several significant combat aircraft of the time, including even the more modern Macchi C 200 and the German Messerschmitt Bf 109E fighters. During the run up to and following the outbreak of the Second World War, the aircraft was ordered by several nations, including Hungary, Sweden, the United Kingdom, and Italy.

Upon entering squadron service, the Re 2000 soon proved to be a technically advanced aircraft, well balanced and extremely aerodynamic during flight, but not without its faults. Although the aircraft was potentially superior to Italian contemporary fighters (Fiat G 50 and Macchi C 200), the Re 2000 was not considered to be satisfactory by Italian military authorities. Consequently, the manufacturer built the type for export and almost all of the first production served with the Swedish Air Force and Hungarian Air Force, rather than in the Regia Aeronautica. The Re.2000 served as the starting point for several derivatives, including the MÁVAG Héja, Reggiane Re.2001, Re.2002, Re.2003, Re.2004, Re.2005, Re.2006 and Re.2007 combat aircraft.

== Development ==
=== Background ===
During 1938, the Italian Air Ministry launched Programme R, a comprehensive effort targeted towards the enactment of several improvements, both qualitative and quantitative, throughout the Regia Aeronautica (Italian Air Force). At the time, those fighter aircraft under consideration for their potential adoption had either already reached the prototype phase of development (such as the Fiat G.50 and the Macchi C.200) or were within advanced stages of development (like the Aeronautica Umbra Trojani AUT.18 and the Caproni Vizzola F.5). However, only one aircraft, designated as the Re 2000 by Italian aircraft manufacturer Reggiane, was intentionally designed with the intention of competing for orders under Programme R in mind.

During 1938, work commenced at Reggiane on a new fighter design; the company's design team, which was headed by Roberto Longhi and Antonio Alessio, set about designing an aircraft that would be offered to the Air Ministry that would not only meet but exceed the requirements of Programme R. Having very little time, the company considered various options, including the potential for manufacturing an American-developed fighter aircraft under license, however, under the influence of aeronautical engineer Giovanni Battista Caproni, a completely new design was rapidly prepared. The design team took inspiration from the contemporary American fighter Seversky P-35, which Re.2000 would superficially resemble; according to aviation author Gianni Cattaneo, the design "displayed evidence of fairly strong American influence...certain structural characteristics were strongly reminiscent of the American school, particularly of the Seversky P-35". Refinement of the Re 2000's aerodynamic characteristics greatly benefitted from a series of wind tunnel tests held at Caproni's facility in Taliedo, Milan.

=== Flight testing ===
On 24 May 1939, the prototype Re 2000 conducted its maiden flight at Reggio Emilia, Emilia-Romagna, Italy, flown by Mario De Bernardi. According to Cattaneo, early flights had quickly demonstrated the type's favourable flying attitude, including good speed and high manoeuvrability. Only minor modifications were required after the successful completion of the initial factory flight test programme; these including changes to the exhaust, the lengthening of the carburetor air intake, and the replacement of the round windshield with a framed counterpart. Following the completion of armament trials at Furbara, Santa Marinella, in August 1939, the prototype was delivered to the Experimental Establishment of the Regia Aeronautica to commence its formal evaluation.

During its original set of trials held at Guidonia by the Regia Aeronautica, conducted throughout late 1939, the prototype was able to attain a speed of 518 km/h at an altitude of 5,250 m, along with 506 km/h at 6,000 m; it also climbed to 6,000 m in 6.5 minutes and demonstrated an 11,500 m altitude ceiling. Throughout the test flights, the aircraft showed that it was capable of excellent performance levels, and on several occasions, it demonstrated the ability to perform better than other existing fighters then in production. In mock dogfights, it could successfully fight not only the slower Fiat CR 42 biplane, but even the more modern Macchi C 200 and the German Messerschmitt Bf 109E fighters.

However, an unfavourable technical report of the prototype was also produced by the Directorate of Aeronautical Construction of the Air Ministry. Amongst its findings, it judged the placing of the integral fuel tanks within the wings to be highly vulnerable and prone to leaks, as well as posing some difficulty to manufacture. The negative conclusions of the technical report directly led to an initial order for 12 pre-production aircraft, which had been drafted towards the latter half of the flight test programme, to be cancelled, along with the instruction to proceed given to Reggiane to prepare the tooling necessary for a wider production run of 188 aircraft. While some consideration was made at Reggiane towards the adoption of a more conventional three-spar wing with normal fuel tanks instead, only a prototype conforming to this configuration was authorised (this subsequently became the basis for the Reggiane Re.2002 ground attack aircraft).

=== Further development ===
The Re.2000GA (Grande Autonomia) version featured additional 340-liter fuel tanks, which was primarily achieved by sealing off the cells of the outer wing structure, to function as a modern long range reconnaissance aircraft for the Regia Marina (Italian Navy). This version was intended to have been used to reach Eastern Africa; during 1941, the Italian government was keen to acquire an aircraft which would be able to fly directly from Italy to Ethiopia. By adopting the Re.2000GA, Italy would be able send reinforcements to the units of the Regia Aeronautica far easier, unlike a batch of 51 C.R.42s that had to be disassembled and air-transported by the large Savoia-Marchetti SM.82s instead. However, the Re.2000GA was not ready to enter operational service until after the Armistice of Cassibile, Italy's surrender to the Allied Powers, had already come into effect.

In comparison to the standard production Re.2000s, the newer Re.2000GA variant was heavier and significantly slower, possessing an empty weight of 2,190 kg compared to the Re.2000's 2,080 kg along with a maximum speed of 520 km/h at 5,300 meters. The armament was a pair of 12.7 mm SAFAT machineguns, complete with 600 rounds, along with provisions for a Nardi dispenser capable of housing 88 2 kg bomblets (this was a typical 'special armament' for the Re.2000). The Re.2000GA was never considered to be highly reliable, even by Re.2000 standards, especially due to its troublesome engine.

The Re.2000bis, equipped with the more powerful P XI bis radial engine, was only manufactured in small numbers. Reportedly, by August 1941, only nine examples had been delivered to the newly formed 377a Squadron.

== Design ==
The Reggiane Re.2000 is an Italian all metal, low-wing monoplane fighter aircraft. It is the first aircraft to be designed by Reggiane to employ aluminum stressed skin construction, as opposed to the wooden or mixed wood and metal structures that had been traditionally used in contemporary Italian aircraft such as the Savoia-Marchetti SM.79 (which had been previously produced by Reggiane under license). The stressed skin fuselage was highly streamlined, save for the protrusions of the hard-rivetted finish. The majority of the aircraft's exterior, including the tail, was metal-skinned; however, the control surfaces had fabric coverings.

In addition to the stressed-skin construction, Reggiane introduced several advanced features on the Re.2000, such as a modern structure, which was considerably more advanced than the ones used in Macchi's and other Italian fighters of the time, along with an elliptical wing profile. Overall, the design possessed greater aerodynamic sophistication in comparison to other Italian rivals such as the Fiat G.50 and Macchi C.200. The Re.2000 was furnished with retractable landing gear; the main gear retracted via the Curtiss method, the wheels rotating around to face flat within the wheel wells when retracted. The atypical fairing covered the landing gear's actuation mechanism, while the legs incorporated hydraulic shock absorbers and drag struts to effectively absorb loads; pneumatic brakes were also fitted. The tail wheel was both retractable and steerable.

However, according to Cattaneo, the Re.2000 was afflicted by a major handicap in the form of the unavailability of reliable in-line engines of sufficient power; as such, the RE.2000 was able to represent only a limited advance over the Macchi C.200. The Re.2000 was powered by a single Piaggio P.XI RC 40 radial engine, which was capable of generating a maximum of 986 hp (735 kW) of thrust; this drove a Piaggio-built three-blade constant speed variable-pitch propeller. This engine proved to be a major weak point of the aircraft in service as it proved to be not altogether reliable. Despite the limitation imposed by a lack of suitable engines, the fighter remained a relatively compact and balanced design.

The aircraft was furnished with an elliptical wing, the internal structure of which comprised a multi-cell configuration using a total of five spars, stress-skin covering, and integral fuel tanks within the center section. The wing made use of a modified N.38 airfoil section and was outfitted with Frise-type ailerons complete with static and aerodynamic balance, along with a split-continuous flap. The cockpit of the Re.2000 featured a large backwards-sliding canopy; it is claimed that this canopy provided "almost unrestricted all-round visibility".

The armament comprised a pair of 12.7 mm Breda-SAFAT machine guns, housing 300 rounds each, installed in the upper fuselage; in addition, provisions were made for the fitting of bomblet-dispensers (spezzoniera). It was also possible to install a gun camera, while a small internal bay could be used to hold a few 4.4 lb (2 kg) incendiary bombs. This armament, while typical amongst Italian-built aircraft at the time, was relatively light in comparison to foreign-built rivals then being constructed; additional weapons, such as the installation of a pair of wing-mounted guns, was studied but never applied.

The Re.2000 had no fuel tanks contained within the fuselage; nevertheless, using the entirety of the wing's internal volume for fuel tankage, it could house a maximum of 460 kg (640 L) of gasoline, providing it with a 900–1,100 km endurance, far in excess of its contemporary rivals built by Macchi and Fiat. However, the Re.2000 was considered to be not as rugged as its Macchi-built contemporaries; specifically, its fuel tanks were considered to be vulnerable, which were not of the self-sealing variety then becoming popular in military service. It has been claimed that this lack of durability had been a major factor when, following an official evaluation by the Regia Aeronautica, the service decided to reject the type.

== Operational history ==
=== Overview ===
Following the decision of the Regia Aeronautica to reject the Re.2000 and cancel its pre-production order, the Italian government authorised Reggiane to promote the type for sales on the global market to international customers, effectively offering the programme a reprieve. Enthusiastic, the company decided to proceed with the production of the original batch of 188 fighters that had been cancelled as a private venture so that immediate delivery could be offered to foreign customers.

Reggiane rapidly set about marketing the Re.2000 towards various interested countries, many of which had been incentivised towards such purchases as a consequence of the breaking out of the Second World War. The type met with a level of success, with several countries being keen to place orders for the type. Accordingly, the Re.2000 was much more prominently used by the Hungarian and Swedish air forces than by the Regia Aeronautica at home. In fact, 80 per cent of the total Re.2000 production went to these two countries; Hungary having ordered 70 aircraft and Sweden opting to procure a batch of 60 machines. Other countries had also exhibited interest in the aircraft, but ultimately did not place orders for the type.

=== British interest ===
In December 1939, a British commission, led by Lord Hardwick and Air Ministry representatives, arrived in Italy for the purpose of purchasing various pieces of military equipment; aside from items such as marine engines, armaments and light reconnaissance bombers, the delegation sought to procure of around 300 Re.2000s. During January 1940, the Director of Aircraft Contracts confirmed the British order. The German government issued its approval of the sale in March of the same year, but withdrew its approval during the following month. In light of this, the Italian and British governments then decided to complete the contract through the Italian Caproni’s Portuguese subsidiary as to side-step Germany's objection; however, the British order was cancelled as a consequence of Italy's entry into the Second World War on 10 June 1940.

=== Italy ===
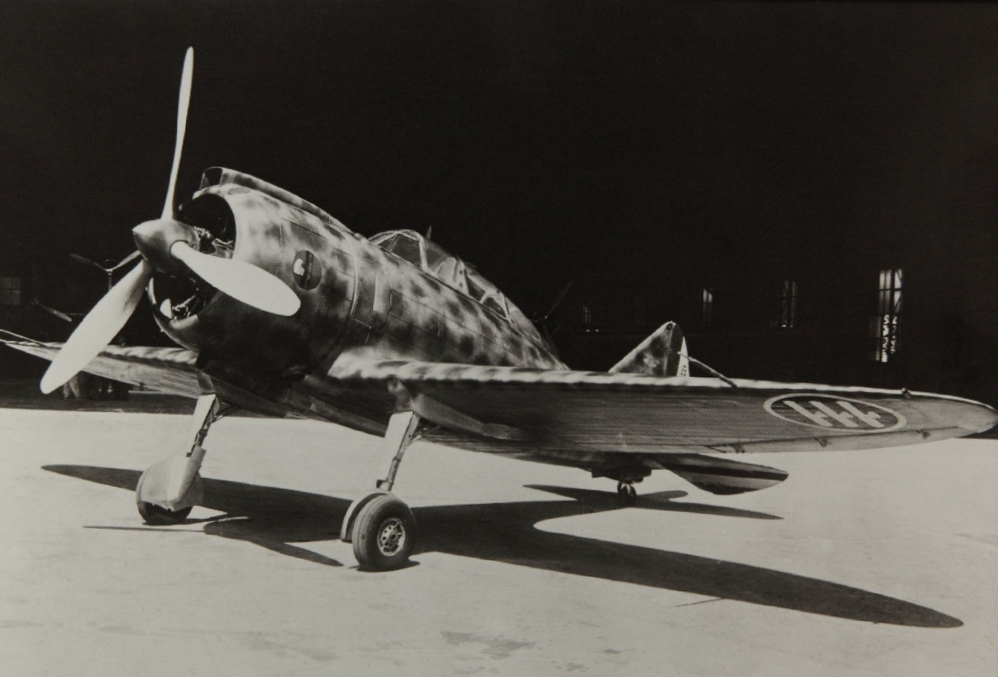
Re.2000

Only five Serie Is served in the Regia Aeronautica, including the prototype. They were organized into the Sezione Sperimentale Reggiane inside the 74a Squadriglia in Sicily. Later it was renamed 377a Squadriglia Autonoma Caccia Terrestre, and received nine further Serie III Re.2000bis; 12 of the 26 Reggianes were later converted to GA standard.

The few Re.2000 and 2000GA were used over Mediterranean Sea as escort and attack aircraft, sometimes with Macchi 200/202s and FIAT CR 25 two-engine fighters. 377a was based in Sicily, and fought in Malta and Pantelleria, mainly in an escort role and protecting Axis ships almost until Tunisia (with a range up to 300–350 km), well beyond the other RA single seat-fighters; sometimes it was used to attack Malta with bomblets (spezzoni) and machine guns, typically at dawn. It reported a single 'kill' against a Bristol Blenheim. Overall, their service was not remarkable: there was at least one sudden fatal flat spin, while another Re.2000 had fatal engine damage (a piston was literally driven through the cylinder) and crash-landed, overturning, catching fire and almost killing its pilot (rescued by the ground crew). Although the Reggiane had a long range, it was disliked and even feared by ground crew and pilots, for its difficult maintenance and unpredictable engine reliability and handling. The last Re.2000 was sent back to the factory in September 1942.

The final fate of Re.2000 in Regia Aeronautica was to serve with 1° Nucleo Addestramento Intercettori (N.A.I.), based at Treviso, and serving for experimental purposes until the Armistice. The last two serviceable aircraft were demolished by the Germans, with another one destroyed after being captured at Furbara.

The Regia Marina (Italian Navy), however, experimented with a carrier version (Serie II) which was successfully launched by catapult. Lacking a carrier, Italy used a similar system to the British CAM ships equipped with Hurricanes. The first proposal was made in late December 1940, although the program officially began with an order issued in April 1943. The first modified Re.2000 Cat. (taken from the Swedish orders) flew on 27 June 1941, the last on 18 January 1942 (MM.8282-8288), but crashed on 10 September. There was another navalized Re.2000, the MM.471. It flew initially with a lower powered A.74 RC.38 engine, but it was lost too, during the travel from Reggio Emilia to Taranto (12 May 1941). The first launch was performed on 9 May 1942 with test pilot Giulio Reiner. The work to make suitable the Re.2000 Cat., nicknamed Ochetta (little goose) took considerable time and only at the beginning of 1943 were they used aboard the Littorio class, but not more than one for every ship (although capable of holding three aircraft). Initially the Re.2000 Cat. aircraft were issued to Littorio and Vittorio Veneto, while Roma followed only in the summer, after testing had taken place aboard the RN Miraglia.

The Re.2000 Cat. was slower than a standard Re.2000; instead of 515–530 kilometres per hour (320–329 mph; 278–286 kn), the maximum speed was only 505–520 kilometres per hour (314–323 mph; 273–281 kn) at 5,500 metres (18,040 ft) km/h at 5,500 m, and 390 kilometres per hour (240 mph; 210 kn) at sea level compared with 541 kilometres per hour (336 mph; 292 kn) for the Re.2000. The climb to 6,000 m was 7,75 min (vs 6,5-7 min), apparently there was not much difference in ceiling 10,000–11,100 m and endurance, range was 450 km, endurance 1,000 km (at 460 km/h), up to km 1,290 (at m 6,000, full loaded, km/h 430). Weights were 2,120–2,870 or, probably with the complete kit, 2,200–2,970 kg; the engine was the P.XIbis, that had 1,000 hp (750 kW) both at take-off and at 4,000 meters. Differing from the Serie I, both Serie II and III variants were equipped with radios. There was the usual Italian armament (two 0.50 caliber Breda machine-guns with 300 rounds each), and some provisions for external loads (tanks or bombs), apparently never utilized.

The Re.2000 were assigned to Squadriglia di Riserva Aerea delle FF.NN.BB. (air reserve squadron for naval battleships), led by Captain Donato Tondi. This was initially based at Grottaglie, then at Capodichino and finally at La Spezia, as air defence for naval bases. The squadron disbanded in April 1943 and was replaced by the 1° Gr. Riserva Aerea delle FF.NN.BB, led by now Maj. Tondi, with three flights. It had all the eight Re.2000s and several old fighters. Many of them were aboard the battleships: two for Vittorio Veneto and Roma, one for Littorio (summer 1943).

Six Re.2000 Cat.s were still available at the time of the Armistice and four were in service aboard the battleships Italia (Littorio before the fall of Mussolini), Roma and Vittorio Veneto (the normal load was only one, the battleship had up to three aircraft, but smaller than the Re.2000). The two left at La Spezia were demolished after September 1943 (they served with 1a Squadriglia). During the Roma's sinking (9 September 1943) only one was launched, as they were a single mission aircraft (forced to reach a land airfield); therefore, Do 217s attacked facing only anti-aircraft guns. The fate of the four Re.2000s was as follows: the one on Roma was lost with the battleship; the one of Italia was damaged and jettisoned from the ship, after the Fritz-X impact. One Re.2000 was launched from Vittorio Veneto to catch the intruders, but failed and finally crashed while landing near Ajaccio airfield. The last one survived and it is still extant, being the only Re.2000 remaining in Italy (another is in Sweden). This is the MM.8287.

=== Hungary ===
Even before the war started, German leaders were reluctant to supply German aircraft to the Royal Hungarian Air Force (Magyar Királyi Honvéd Légierő, MKHL), which was seen to be focused on home defense and the possibility of conflict with neighboring Romania. Furthermore, the deliveries of German aircraft went primarily to front-line formations rather than to home defense units. Moreover, Adolf Hitler held a bad opinion of the Hungarian aviators, expressing this view in early 1942 when Hungary issued another request for German-built fighters. "They would not use the single-seaters against the enemy but just for pleasure flights!... What the Hungarians have achieved in the aviation field to date is more than paltry. If I am going to give some aircraft, then rather to the Croats, who have proved they have an offensive spirit. To date, we have experienced only fiascos with the Hungarians." So, the Hungarian Air Force (MKHL) obtained much of their aircraft from Italy instead. This would change in October 1942, from which point the Germans would give the Hungarians modern German aircraft and their licenses.

Early in the war, the MKHL was a significant purchaser of Italian aircraft and can be said to have been the main operator of the Re.2000 through their extensive use of MÁVAG Héjas. Hungary bought 70 Reggiane Re.2000 Falco Is and then also acquired the license-production rights for this model. The Hungarians used their own modified Re.2000s known as MÁVAG Héja Is ("Hawk Is"), and produced their own heavily modified fighters known as MÁVAG Héja IIs ("Hawk IIs") which were based on the Re.2000. A total of 204 MÁVAG Héja IIs were built. According to other sources, between 170 and 203 aircraft were constructed.

The MÁVAG Héja I was used in combat on the Eastern Front. MÁVAG Héja IIs were not used on the Eastern Front; instead, Héja IIs operated inside Hungary in an air defense role, intercepting bombers or as advanced trainers. When introduced, the modern Héja was an upgrade over the fighters that Hungary was operating, but eventually, it was replaced by the Bf 109 (F-4 and G variants) when Germany gave Hungary access to them. From October 1942 until the end of the war, Hungarian pilots flew Bf 109s – both those supplied by Germany and those that were license produced in Hungary. The Bf 109 became Hungary's main fighter and bore the brunt of the fighting, while Héjas remained as reserves and trainers.

Unfortunately, the Re.2000s received by Hungary were plagued with issues. They had faulty throttles, machine guns that often jammed or were misaligned, canopy panels that fell out during flight, and wing skin damage. These issues led to one aircraft being lost but were eventually corrected. Also, the wing fuel tanks of the Re.2000s received by Hungary were poorly sealed, with many of them leaking. When these Re.2000s were modified into Héja Is, the wing fuel tanks were left unchanged, so this issue remained, and many flew with constantly leaking fuel tanks.

The MÁVAG Héja I had a Hungarian engine, a different propeller, armor for the pilot, an additional 100 L fuel tank (in the fuselage, self-sealing), a radio, a lengthened fuselage, and other changes differentiating it from the Re.2000. The MÁVAG Héja II retained some of the changes from the Héja I but also had much better Hungarian machine guns installed (12.7 mm Gebauer 1940.M GKMs), replacing the original Italian ones, and the larger (often leaking) fuel tanks in the wings were replaced with 22 smaller 20-25 L ones. Surprisingly, the fuel tank changes noticeably improved the fighter's stability by reducing fuel sloshing in the tank. It also had a newer, more powerful (1085 hp) Hungarian engine – the WM K-14B, a redesigned cowling, a larger Hungarian-made Weiss Manfréd propeller, and more changes further differentiating it from the Re.2000.

The Re.2000s received from Italy were modified into MÁVAG Héja Is in Hungary. Then they were sent to Debrecen to strengthen home defenses, as there was a danger that the growing crisis over Transylvania could lead to a conflict with Romania. However, conflict was avoided, and the Héja Is were used on the Eastern Front in the war against the Soviet Union.

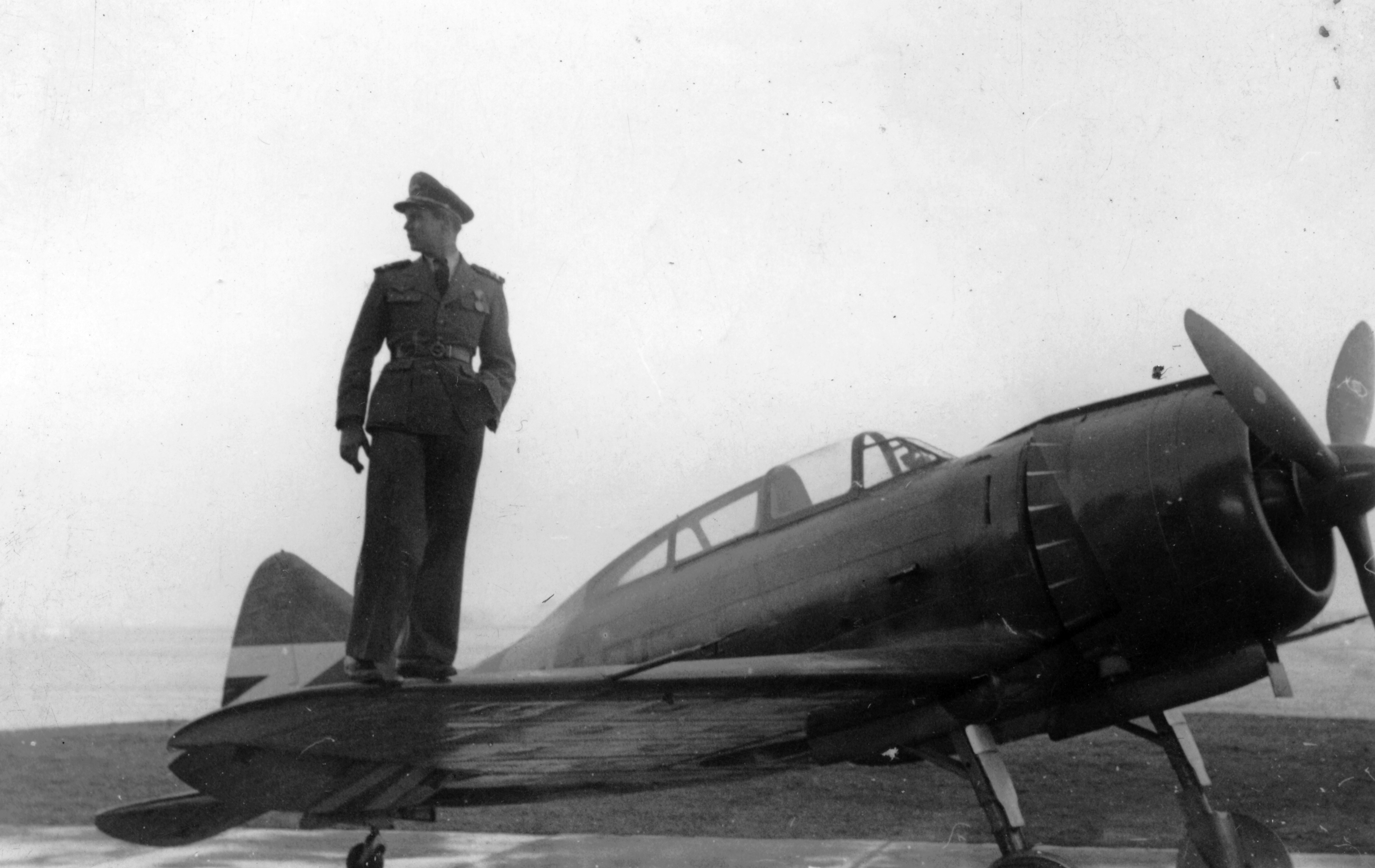
A Hungarian MÁVAG Héja I in 1943

The first seven MÁVAG Héja Is were sent to the Eastern Front on an experimental basis during the summer/autumn of 1941. Flying alongside the Fiat CR.32s of 1/3 Fighter Company, the Héja I pilots claimed eight kills for one loss during three months of combat against the Soviet Air Force. In the summer of 1942, the Hungarian Air Force contributed with its 1st Repülőcsoport (aviation detachment) to the German offensive Fall Blau. 1/1 Fighter Group (1./I Vadász Osztály), equipped with 13 Héja Is, reached its first front base near Kursk on 2 July. By 3 August, 2/1 FS joined the other Hungarian fighter unit that had moved to Ilovskoye airfield. The task of 2/1 was to escort short-range reconnaissance aircraft, while 1/1 would support bombing missions.

Combat performance against the Soviet Air Force was satisfactory. On 4 August, the Hungarians claimed their first kills, when Ens Vajda shot down two enemy aircraft. The first Hungarian ace of the war, 2/Lt Imre Pánczél, claimed his first air victories while flying the Héja I, three of them in one sortie, in 1942.

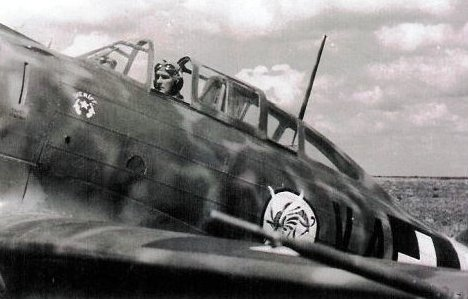
István Horthy in his MÁVAG Héja I

The Hungarian Héja Is had their most successful day on 9 August 1942. That day, near the village of Davidovka, 16 Ilyushin Il-2s and a similar number of LaGG-3s were intercepted by four Héja Is. The Hungarians downed four LaGGs, suffering the loss of the Héja I of Lt Takács, who crash-landed behind his own lines, wounded.

However, the Héja I's flight characteristics were markedly different from the Fiat CR.32, from which Hungarian pilots frequently converted. The Héja I was much more prone to handling difficulties, especially stalls and spins, as well as reliability issues. All of the 24 Héja Is had suffered accidents (minor and major) within a month of combat deployment.

Landing and takeoff accidents were common on the rudimentary Soviet airfields due to the Héja I's unchanged landing gear inherited from the Re.2000. The Re.2000's landing gear was not as rugged and sturdy as the CR.32's gear. After a steel plate was added behind the cockpit for the protection of the pilots, the shift in the aircraft's center of gravity led to more frequent accidents. In a highly publicized accident, 1/Lt István Horthy (the eldest son of the Hungarian regent Miklós Horthy), serving as a fighter pilot with the Hungarian Second Army, died flying his Héja I V.421 with 1/3 Fighter Squadron on 20 (on 18, according to other authors) August 1942, on his 25th operational sortie. István was very popular in Hungary, was pro-Western, was opposed to the Holocaust and often publicly criticized Nazism, despite Hungary being a part of the Axis. Shortly after takeoff, a pilot flying above asked István Horthy to increase his altitude, he pulled up too suddenly, stalled and crashed. According to other sources, his aircraft entered a flat spin after he made a turn at low speed to fly in close formation with a He 46 reconnaissance aircraft. Some were convinced that the Germans had sabotaged his aircraft.

Nevertheless, the determined Hungarian pilots kept on flying combat missions with the Héja I and scoring a number of kills against Soviet aircraft. When they managed to force their Soviet opponents into a dogfight, thanks to the great maneuverability of the Héja, the Hungarian pilots were often successful.

The Hungarian Héja Is flew their last sorties on the Soviet front on 14 and 15 January 1943, when they took off for uneventful patrols and reconnaissance missions. Between 16 and 19 January, with the Red Army rapidly approaching Ilovskoye airfield, and with no time to heat the engines' frozen oil, mechanics were forced to blow up the last unserviceable Héja Is.

The surviving Héjas were kept in Hungary for home defense. Production of Héja IIs in Hungary continued until August 1944: 98 were completed in 1943 and 72 in 1944, although the aircraft was regarded as no longer suitable for combat against the latest Soviet fighters. Hungary requested that an additional 50–100 Re.2000 airframes be manufactured in Italy, as suitable engines and armament could be locally manufactured; additionally, other countries expressed interest, including Finland (100 examples), Portugal (50), Spain, Switzerland and Yugoslavia. However, no airframes were available by then.

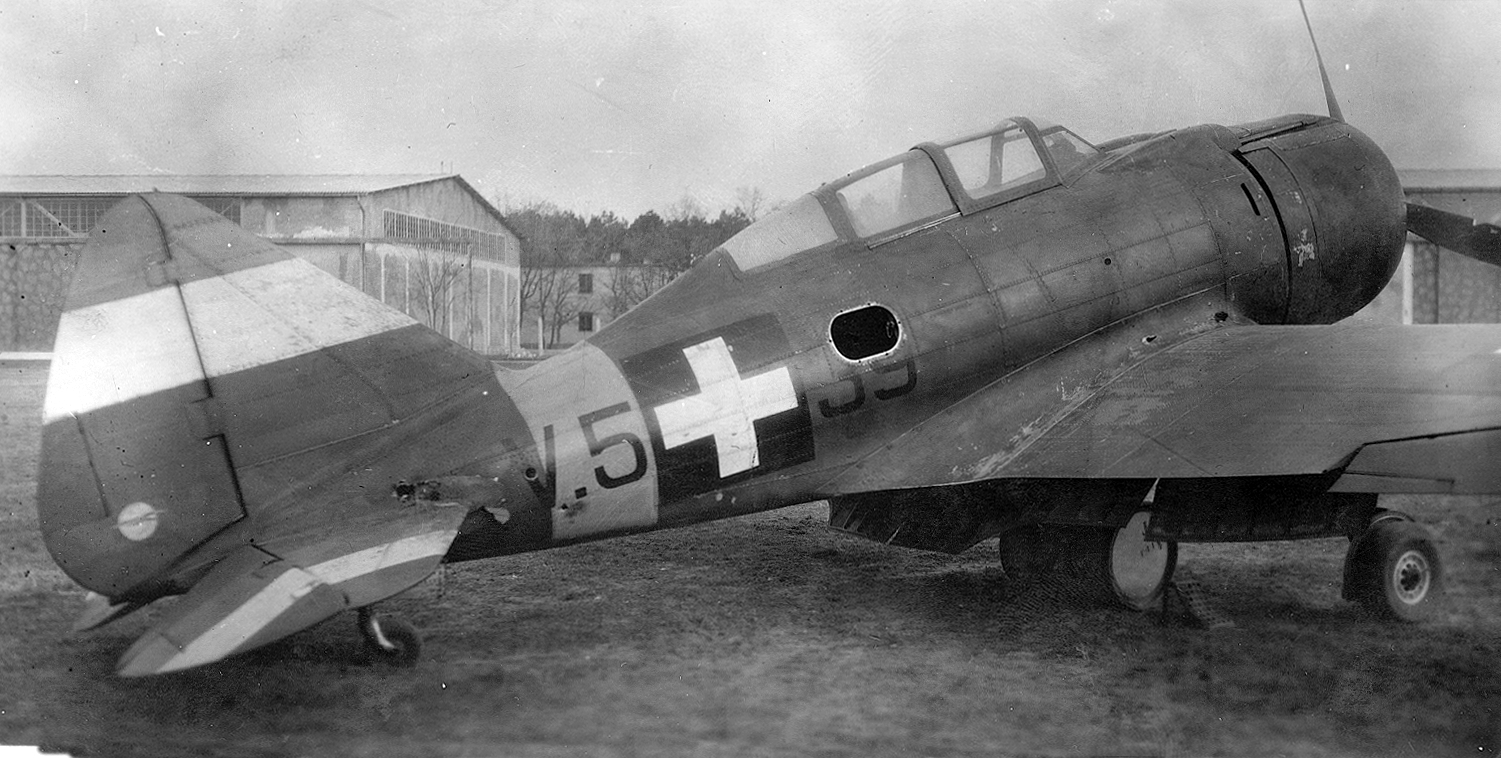
A Hungarian MÁVAG Héja II in Hungary, 13 April 1944

By April 1944, the MKHL still deployed four Héja IIs in 1/1 Fighter squadron and four Héja IIs in 1/2, all of them based in Szolnok for home defense duties, along with about 40 Bf 109s and Messerschmitt Me 210s.

On 2 April 1944, 180 bombers from the USAAF 15th Air Force, escorted by 170 fighters, bombed the Danube Aircraft Works and other targets in Budapest. The Hungarian Fighter Control Center in the Gellért hill, near Budapest, scrambled one wing of Héjas from 1/1 Fighter squadron, along with 12 Bf 109 G-4/G-6s and a couple of Messerschmitt Me 210 Ca-1s from the Experimental Air Force Institute (Repülő Kísérleti Intézet, RKI). The Hungarians reported 11 aerial victories, of which six were confirmed, while USAAF pilots claimed 27 MKHL aircraft shot down. However, later records showed only two Honvéd (MKHL) pilots were killed.

On 13 April 1944, Budapest was attacked by 15th Air Force bombers, accompanied by P-38s from the 1st Fighter Group, led by Lieutenant Alford. Pilots of the P-38s reported the downing of two Re.2001s to the west of Lake Balaton, which were actually MÁVAG Héja IIs. The Americans only damaged one of them.

As the situation for the Axis worsened, American and British bombing raids on Hungarian factories and infrastructure became common and many unfinished Héja IIs were destroyed, having never left the factory. Material shortages also hit Hungary hard, causing many complete Héja IIs to be grounded. A lack of spare parts also meant that many Héja IIs would just have to idly wait for these instead of being used in combat. During the last months of 1944, the 101/6 Training Squadron of the famous 101st Home Air Defence Fighter Wing "Pumas" had six flying Héja IIs. The last official report mentioning Héja IIs was dated 22 February 1945. It concerned a Héja II that crashed during a training flight.

=== Sweden ===
The Swedish purchases of various types of Italian warplanes in 1939–41 were made as an emergency measure resulting from the outbreak of the war, as no other nations were willing to supply aircraft to this small neutral country whose domestic production did not become sufficient until 1943. The Swedish Air Force purchased 60 Re.2000 Serie Is, which received the Swedish designation J 20 and were delivered during 1941–43.

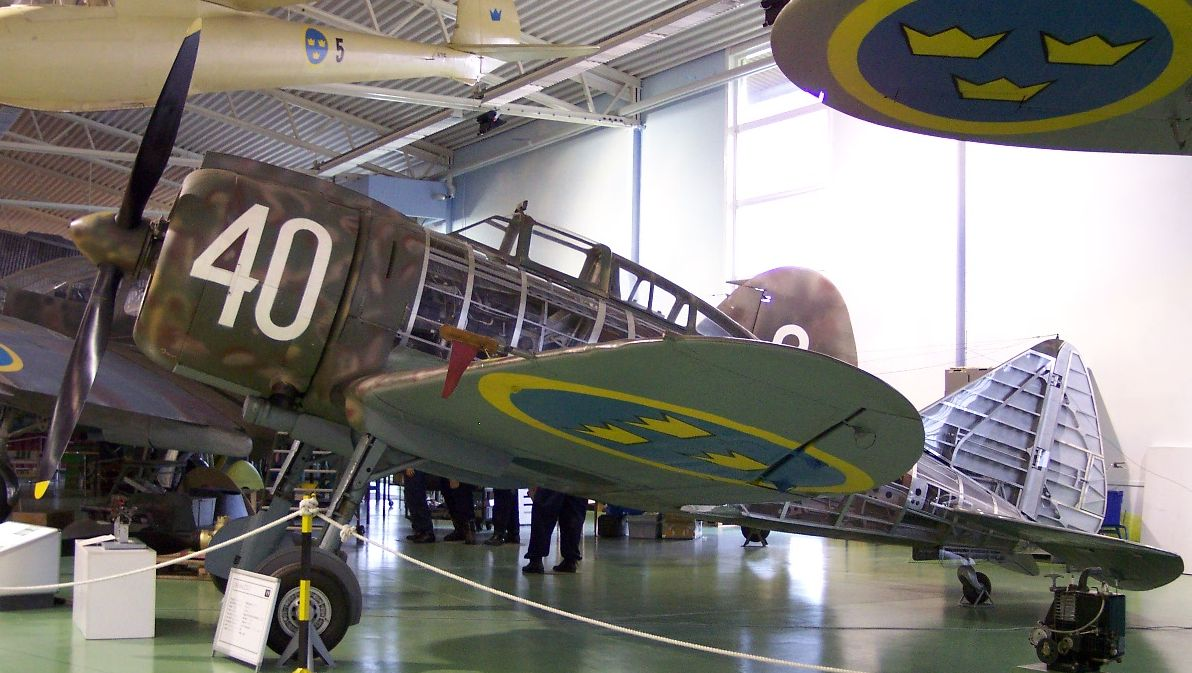
Re.2000 at Swedish Air Force Museum in Linköping

All of the J 20s were stationed at the F10 wing, Bulltofta airbase, Malmö, in the southern tip of Sweden in 1941–45. They were mainly used to intercept Axis and Allied bombers that violated Swedish airspace. One J 20 was lost in combat, shot down while intercepting a Luftwaffe Dornier Do 24 near Sölvesborg on 3 April 1945.

The pilots appreciated the type, which performed well under harsh conditions and was the fastest aircraft then in operation with the service. However, the Re.2000's mechanical reliability was unable to meet Swedish Air Force requirements; reportedly, the aircraft normally had to spend a great deal of time in maintenance. At the end of the conflict, the 37 J 20s that remained in service were so badly worn out that they were decommissioned during July 1945 and were subsequently scrapped, while only one of these was retained for display purposes.

== Variants ==
=== Italian variants ===
Re.2000
Initial prototype, one built.
Re.2000 Serie I
Production model, 157 built. Serie I had modified windshield and slight equipment changes.
Re.2000 Serie II
Ship-borne version, 10 built. Serie II had a 1,025 hp Piaggio P.XIbis engine and arrester gear.
Re.2000 (GA) Serie III
Long-range fighter, 12 built. Serie III had redesigned cockpit, increased fuel capacity and option of a 170 L auxiliary fuel tank or a dispenser of 22 2 kg bomblets.
RE 2000 "Catapultabile"
Re 2000 aircraft modified for catapult launch from Regia Marina ships. On the day of the armistice, 8 September 1943, 6 Re 2000 "Catapultabile " were in service, with two on the battleship Roma and one each on the Vittorio Veneto and Italia (formerly the Littorio).

=== Hungarian variants ===
MÁVAG Héja I ("Hawk I")
Hungarian modified version of the Re.2000. The MÁVAG Héja I had a Hungarian engine, a different propeller, armor for the pilot, an additional 100 L fuel tank (in the fuselage, self-sealing), a radio, a lengthened fuselage, and other changes differentiating it from the Re.2000.
MÁVAG Héja II ("Hawk II")
Entirely Hungarian-produced fighter based on the Re.2000, but heavily modified. The Héja II kept some of the modifications from the Héja I, but also had two better Hungarian 12.7 mm Gebauer 1940.M GKM machine guns with 300 rpg rather than two Italian 12.7 mm Breda-SAFAT machine guns. These Hungarian machine guns had a much higher rate of fire of 1000 rpm and a bit better muzzle velocity at 800 m/s when compared to the Italian machine guns. On top of these changes, the Héja II also had a newer, more powerful (1085 hp) Hungarian engine – the WM K-14B, a redesigned cowling, smaller fuel tanks in the wings (22 × 20-25 L ones), a larger Hungarian-made Weiss Manfréd propeller, and more changes. 204 Héja IIs were built.
MÁVAG Héja II Zuhanóbombázó ("Dive Bomber")
MÁVAG Héja II modified with underwing dive brakes powered by Bosch electric motors, a dive-bombing sight, and a centerline bomb rack that could carry either a 250 or 500 kg bomb. 3 converted from Héja II fighters.

== Operators ==
Germany

- Luftwaffe

Hungary

- Royal Hungarian Air Force

Kingdom of Italy

- Regia Aeronautica

Sweden

- Swedish Air Force

== Specifications (Re.2000 Series I) ==
Data from Re.2000...The 'State-of-the-Art' Reggiane, The Reggiane Re.2000 (Aircraft in Profile Number 123)

General characteristics

- Crew: 1
- Length: 7.99 m (26 ft 3 in)
- Wingspan: 11 m (36 ft 1 in)
- Height: 3.2 m (10 ft 6 in)
- Wing area: 20.4 m^{2} (220 sq ft)
- Airfoil: N-38
- Empty weight: 2,090 kg (4,608 lb)
- Gross weight: 2,839 kg (6,259 lb)
- Powerplant: 1 × Piaggio P.XI R.C.40 14-cylinder air-cooled radial piston engine 1,000 CV (986 hp; 735 kW) at 4,000 m (13,000 ft)
- Propellers: 3-bladed Piaggio-D'Ascanio, 3.1 m (10 ft 2 in) diameter constant-speed propeller

Performance

- Maximum speed: 530 km/h (330 mph, 290 kn) at 5,300 m (17,400 ft)
- Cruise speed: 440 km/h (270 mph, 240 kn)
- Range: 545 km (339 mi, 294 nmi)
- Service ceiling: 11,200 m (36,700 ft)
- Time to altitude: 4,000 m (13,000 ft) in 4 minutes
- Wing loading: 137 kg/m^{2} (28 lb/sq ft)

Armament

- Guns: 2 × 12.7 mm (0.50 in) Breda-SAFAT machine guns in the upper cowling with 300 rounds per gun

== See also ==
Related development

- MÁVAG Héja (Hungarian fighter based on the Re.2000)
- Reggiane Re.2001
- Reggiane Re.2002
- Reggiane Re.2003
- Reggiane Re.2004
- Reggiane Re.2005
- Reggiane Re.2006
- Reggiane Re.2007

Aircraft of comparable role, configuration, and era

- Bloch MB.152
- Curtiss P-36
- Curtiss-Wright CW-21
- IAR 80
- Macchi C.200
- Mitsubishi A6M
- Nakajima Ki-43
- Polikarpov I-180
- PZL.50
- Seversky P-35
- Weiss Manfréd WM-23 Ezüst Nyíl

Related lists

- List of fighter aircraft
- List of aircraft of Italy in World War II
- List of aircraft of World War II
