= Reggiane Re.2005 Sagittario =

Italian fighter aircraft during WWII

Re.2005 Sagittario

General information
- Type: Fighter
- Manufacturer: Reggiane
- Primary users: Aeronautica Nazionale Repubblicana Regia Aeronautica; Luftwaffe
- Number built: 48

History
- Manufactured: September 1942 – May 1944
- Introduction date: April/May 1943
- First flight: 9 May 1942
- Retired: 1945
- Developed from: Reggiane Re.2001
- Variant: Reggiane Re.2004

The Reggiane Re.2005 Sagittario (English: Archer, Sagittarius) was a monoplane fighter and fighter-bomber designed and produced by the Italian aircraft manufacturer Reggiane. It was principally operated by the Regia Aeronautica during the later years of the Second World War, being the last of the Reggiane aircraft line to enter service during the conflict.

Along with the Macchi C.205 Veltro and Fiat G.55 Centauro, the Re.2005 was one of the three Serie 5 Italian fighters. It was specifically designed to be powered by the German-sourced Daimler-Benz DB 605 V-12 inline engine. The airframe was largely composed of light alloys while lines of the fuselage were streamlined for aerodynamic efficiency. Distinctive features of the aircraft included its semi-elliptical wings, lengthy nose and large tail unit; it was also the only Italian fighter aircraft of the conflict to be furnished with hydraulically-actuated flaps. One major drawback of the Re.2005 was a structural weakness present in the rear section of the fuselage. The prototype performed its maiden flight on 9 May 1942 and quantity production commenced during September of that same year.

Entering squadron service in April 1943, the Re.2005 participated in the defense of the Italian homeland, including of Naples, Rome and Sicily. In addition to its use by the Regia Aeronautica, the Luftwaffe also became interested in the type. However, the Re.2005 was never produced in large numbers, only 48 aircraft having been delivered before the Armistice of Cassibile was enacted in September 1943; production of the type came to an end during the following year. Nevertheless, both sides of the conflict operated the fighter in the closing months of the conflict; Re.2005s (in German insignia) were present during the final defense of Berlin in 1945. The type garnered a reputation of not only to be one of the best Axis wartime aircraft but also one of the best, if not the best-looking. British ace and military observer, Group Captain Duncan Smith, DSO DFC, stated that "The Re.2005 was altogether a superb, potent aeroplane".

== Design and development ==
=== Background ===
Throughout the 1930s, the Italian military authorities chose to adopt only radial engines to power their aircraft; consequently, during the second half of the 1930s, the Italian aeronautical industry had been sufficiently de-incentivised to the point of completely avoiding the development of more powerful engines based on streamlined liquid-cooled designs, which would become popular abroad. By 1941, Italy, having become an active participant in the Second World War during the previous year, recognised the need to improve its military capabilities, particularly in terms of its combat aircraft. Accordingly, work commenced on the development of what would become the Re.2005; the company's design team was headed by the Italian aeronautical engineer Roberto Longhi, other designers included Alessio, Maraschini, Toniolo and Pozzi. Preliminary work was reportedly completed before the end of the year, despite being a clean-sheet design rather than a more straightforward development of an existing design, such as the Reggiane Re.2002. During February 1942, the airframe of the prototype was completed, by which point the German-sourced Daimler-Benz DB 605 inline engine was ready to be delivered.

On 9 May 1942, the first prototype MM.494 performed its maiden flight; one day later, it was seriously damaged after a heavy landing had resulted in an undercarriage failure, forcing the aircraft to be grounded until June (MM.494 was damaged twice more in tests). This prototype was armed with four Breda 12.7 mm machine guns along with a single Mauser cannon; it was primarily used for testing, but later saw active use during the aerial defense of Naples. After a fierce competition, in which the Macchi C.205N Veltro was quickly abandoned and the G.55 was considered better from a production point of view (being only marginally inferior as a fighter but much easier to mass produce), the Regia Aeronautica ordered the production of 750 Re.2005 aircraft, an optimistic figure in wartime Italy.

=== Technical design ===
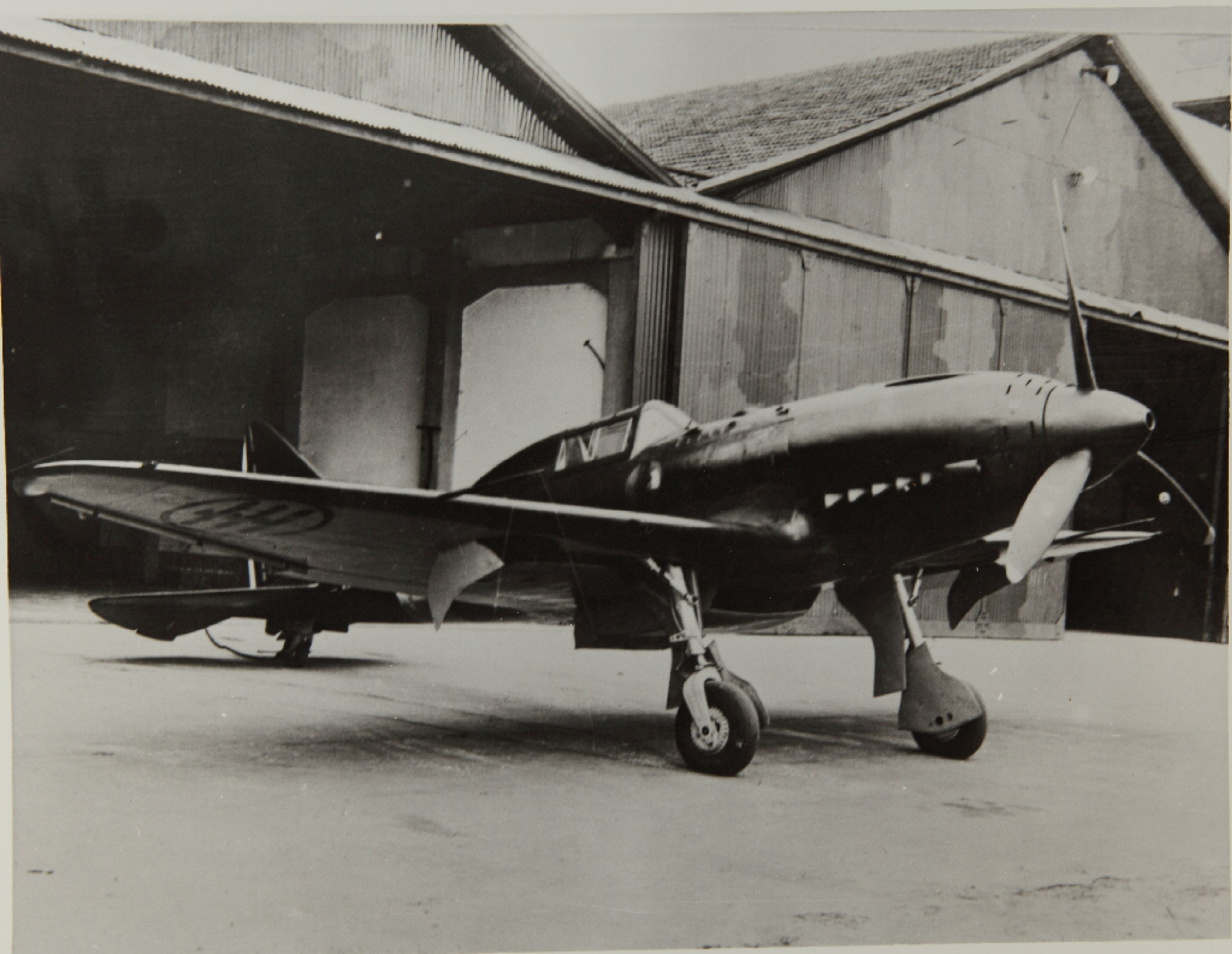
Re.2005 prototype photographed at the factory, spring 1942; note the lack of a radio mast behind the cockpit

The Re.2005 was a low-wing, single-engine, single-seat fighter monoplane that was largely composed of light alloys. Propulsion was by a 1,475 hp (1,100 kW) Daimler Benz DB.605A-1 engine, either of original German production or built by Fiat as the RA.1050 RC.58 Tifone (Typhoon). The aircraft was equipped with a right-handed, three-bladed Piaggio P.2001 constant speed, mechanically controlled, variable-pitch metal propeller. The streamlined and compact fuselage was almost totally dominated by the DB 605 engine and left relatively little space to accommodate fuel. The fuselage-mounted MG 151/20 cannon had less ammunition than those mounted in the wings (150 rounds versus 170 rounds in the wing gun bays from the second prototype on). The comparable Fiat G.55 Centauro had 250 rounds for the fuselage gun but also 600 for a 12.7 mm machine gun. The smaller Re.2005 also carried 100 fewer 20 mm but 100 more 12.7 mm rounds, a lighter armament array.

The aft fuselage was unusually compact, even by Italian standards, accommodating both the radio apparatus and oxygen bottles while also supporting the aircraft's relatively large fin. The cockpit was covered by a canopy which tilted to the right for access and had an armoured 50 mm glass windscreen. Other protection included a seat with 8 mm (0.31 in)-thick steel shell weighing 40 kg (88 lb). The seat provided little protection against 12.7 mm rounds which were capable of piercing even 25 mm (0.98 in) at short distances but the armour was tempered, giving more protection than homogeneous steel. Given the relatively heavy weight of a thick steel plate, every attempt was made to make the steel alloy used stronger and a headrest was attached to bulkhead six.

The sophisticated wing design, which has often been described as being elliptical, was semi-elliptical; the wing thickness tapered from 15 percent at the root to 8 per cent at the tip. The structure of the three spars incorporated a "T" section. The triangular-shaped wing and tail control surfaces were mostly fabric-covered, included all-metal two-part split flaps and statically balanced ailerons. Fuel was carried in four self-sealing wing tanks (two forward and two behind) that provided a total capacity of 525 L (115 imp gal; 139 US gal). The wide-track undercarriage retracted outwards into the wings while the tail-wheel was fully retractable as well. The Re.2005 was the only Italian aircraft of the conflict to possess hydraulically-actuated flaps. The Re.2005 was one of the most advanced Italian fighters but it was too advanced to be easily produced by the Italian industry and one of the most expensive, if not the most expensive, fighter to produce. The complexity of the Re.2005, as well as its small dimensions, contributed to the competing Fiat G.55 being judged the better choice for mass production.

== Operational history ==
The first pilot to use the Re. 2005 in action was Maggiore Vittorio Minguzzi, commander of 22° Gruppo. The unit was based at Napoli-Capodichino airfield for the defense of the city. Minguzzi received the prototype of the Re.2005 (MM.494)—after flight test evaluations in Guidonia—and made the first flight with this aircraft on 7 March 1943. He and the most able pilots in the Gruppo flew this prototype until 23 March and they all had a very favourable and enthusiastic impression of it. Minguzzi subsequently flew the prototype to Napoli-Capodichino, where it was incorporated into 362a Squadriglia; this unit, commanded by Capitano Germano La Ferla, was the first to be equipped with the Re.2005.

Minguzzi scrambled for the first time in the Sagittario on 24 March, when Naples was attacked and on 2 April he claimed a four-engined B-24 Liberator bomber over the Isle of Ischia. This claim is not verified against corresponding USAAF losses. Italian ace Vittorio Minguzzi was impressed by this aircraft following its tests and combat debut on 2 April 1943. He wrote:

The aircraft is in ideal flying conditions at an altitude of 7,000–7,500 m (23,000–24,600 ft) and can make repeated attacks on American heavy bombers in all positions and from all directions... I can therefore say that the speed and handling qualities are excellent even at 7,000 m (23,000 ft) and that compared to the Macchi 202, the Sagittario made two attacks in the time required by the Macchi C.202 for a single pass.

This statement provides a realistic comparison between the two aircraft: in theoretical speed, the Macchi C.202 was only 30 km/h (19 mph) slower but the Re.2005 with the DB-605 engine and larger wing, provided a substantial improvement in performance at high altitude (the difference was less marked at medium-to-low altitudes, as the comparison with the C.205V showed). During April, 362a Squadriglia received three more Re.2005s from the 0-serie but the number of Re.2005s in the 22° Gruppo never exceeded eight.

The first confirmed air victories came on 28 April, when four Re.2005s from 22° Gruppo scrambled (with C.202s and one Dewoitine D.520) from Capodichino to intercept a formation of 30 B-24s Liberators, escorted by 30 fighters heading for Naples. The Re.2005s were flown by Maggiore Minguzzi, Capitano La Ferla, Tenente Giulio Torresi and Sergente Donati. The 22o Gruppo claimed one B-24 (by Minguzzi) and four probables (one was later confirmed by ground observer and credited to Donati). Ten more were claimed as shared damaged by the whole Gruppo.

More aircraft arrived at 362a Squadriglia and in the following weeks, this unit displayed a lot more potency than C.202 units, claiming several bombers for the loss of a pair of Re.2005s. By 25 June 1943, Reggiane Re.2005 pilots claimed a total of seven B-24s and many others damaged but losses claimed seldom matched true losses. (See for example the passage in the entry for Macchi C.205 describing the Battle of Capo Pula on 2 August, when none of the 12 P-38 Lightnings claimed were lost by the USAAF, whereas the Americans claimed three or four victories over the Axis fighters with no losses. Later records showed that only a Catalina and a C.202 were shot down.) At least one Reggiane, MM.092343 of Lt. Moresi, was shot down.

On 2 July 1943, 362a was sent to Sicily to face the imminent invasion and were involved in combat with Spitfires, claiming five shot down from 11 to 14 July (two were confirmed kills: a reconnaissance Spitfire and another downed in a strafing attack over Comiso). Spitfires were formidable opponents (even if many were only Mk Vs), with two Re.2005s destroyed on 11 July and the rest bombed or strafed on the ground. Only two aircraft returned to Sicily.

Ten more fighters joined 362a but when one was damaged in a steep dive on 21 August 1943, some concern was raised. On 25 August, MM.092356 (Lt Dario Signorini bailed out) was lost during another dive and so further flights were discontinued. It was discovered that at speeds over 660 km/h (410 mph) TAS, every manoeuvre could adversely affect the flight control in the tail and then cause damage to the fuselage from flutter. Re.2005 pilots were forbidden from attaining very high speeds (VNE 800 km/h (500 mph)) but by then, operations were winding down as the Armistice of Cassibile was taking effect. During trials conducted in July 1943, Cmdr. de Prato achieved a speed of 980 km/h (610 mph) in a dive with no loss of control and experienced no flutter.

The production Fiat R.A. 1050 Tifone engines, licensed produced DB 605s, were limited to 2,650 rpm instead of the usual 2,800 rpm with a corresponding drop in power from 1,100 to 1,007 kW (1,475 to 1,350 hp). The MM.494 prototype fitted with a DB 605 had a recorded speed of 678 km/h (421 mph) when flown fully equipped but this speed was attained by levelling the aircraft after a dive. The official maximum speed was 628.5 km/h (390.5 mph) at an altitude of 6,950 m (22,800 ft). The Re.2005 had good handling in dogfights and according to General Minguzzi, who flew both the Re.2005 and the Spitfire, the Re. 2005 was even better than the Spitfire in tight turns and handling..

One of the few examples of combat reports is dated 11 July 1943, when, together with other Italian fighters, Ten. Eugenio Salvi's Re.2005 fought against Spitfires over Sicily. After Salvi evaded the hunt of many Spitfires, a Spitfire Mk IX latched onto the tail of his Re.2005. Salvi tried all the tricks he knew: dives, tight turns climbs and tonneaus, but the Spitfire remained steadily attached to his tail, following every move. Salvi's Re.2005 slowly gained in turns, but he was physically exhausted due to the long battle and, when he finally had to widen the turn radius the Spitfire opened fire. Salvi's Re.2005 was struck by many bullets and Salvi was sure he was going to be killed. He managed to tighten the turn radius again, moving away from the bullets' trajectory, and the Spitfire was still chasing him, then it suddenly vanished, possibly out of ammunition. Fuel levels and pilots skill probably were the deciding factor in this incident. After the war, in 1949–1950 as flying Instructor at the Lecce air school of the Italian Air Force, Salvi flew extensively the Spitfire Mk IX. His impressions coincided with those of Gen. Minguzzi. He considered the Re.2005 superior in turn, even if he preferred the Merlin engine to the DB.605.

On 25 August de Prato carried out test dives at Guidonia. He then flew the aircraft back to Reggio Emilia where three more dives were made on 27, 29 and 31 August. According to De Prato's account, the tests concluded that the "shaking" began at 660 km/h (410 mph) true air speed and that they were caused by inadequate dynamic balancing of the empennage, the balance likely lost during full excursion rudder maneuvers performed during dives. After correcting the balancing, de Prato dived the aircraft to 980 km/h (610 mph) TAS convincing himself that the structure of the Re.2005 was fully capable of high g maneuvers. De Prato wrote, "Our pilots were used to small rudder control surfaces, such those of Macchis and Messerschmitts; with such aircraft full excursion rudder movements were not a problem".

With the armistice on 8 September 1943, some of the few surviving Re.2005s were destroyed by their pilots to prevent them from falling into German hands. Six aircraft were used as trainers by the Aeronautica Nazionale Repubblicana (ANR) (the air force of the German allied Italian Social Republic). About thirteen Re.2005s were seized by Germany and some sources have these aircraft in use during late 1943 by the Luftwaffe for air defense against Allied bombing raids over Berlin; others believe that the Re.2005s were used by the Germans in Romania as interceptors over the Ploiești oil fields. Other research indicates that the aircraft probably never left Italy; on 18 March 1944, three aircraft of the Luftdienst Kommando Italien (M.M.096100, 096106, 096110) were severely damaged at Maniago by a U.S. air raid, while at least three others suffered accidents at Maniago (096108: 16 March 1944, 096100: 1 June 1944) and Airasca (19 April 1944) and were returned to Reggiane for repairs. As late as 31 July 1944, five Re.2005 were listed in service with the Flieger Ziel Staffel 20, which operated them from June to December 1944.

The Re.2005 climbed almost as well as the Bf 109G-14 and turned almost as well as the Spitfire Mk IX, having a turn radius of 195 m (639 ft) without full flaps and 148 m (487 ft) with full flap. German tests at the Rechlin test center concluded that the aircraft "curved well, rolled like the Bf 109 G-4 with rudder forces a little less".

Grp Cpt. Duncan Smith, DSO, DFC, a British fighter pilot and fighter leader of the Second World War, greatly respected the Re.2005:

The Re.2005 'Sagittario' was a potent aircraft. Having had a dog-fight with one of them, I am convinced we would have been hard pressed to cope in our Spitfires operationally, if the Italians or Germans had had a few Squadrons equipped with these aircraft at the beginning of the Sicily campaign or in operations from Malta. Fast, and with excellent manoeuvrability, the Re.2005 was altogether a superb aeroplane. Neither the Macchi 205 nor the Bf 109G measured up to the capabilities of the Re.2005 series in manoeuvrability or rate of climb. I think it was easily the best aircraft Italy produced. It is a pity that no Re.2001/5s survive this day because they were fine examples of Italian engineering craftsmanship.

It seems that one of the two Reggiane that had returned to Sicily was captured by the United States Army Air Forces and sent to the US. Little is known of this aircraft, which vanished after the war. While German and some Japanese aircraft were extensively tested, the few captured Italian aircraft (another extant example is a captured Macchi C.202) were not known to be tested, so detailed information about them and their flight characteristics is scarce. Sweden was interested in the Re.2005 (already producing the DB-605 under licence) but the order for 50 airframes was never finalized. Total production included two prototypes used as preproduction aircraft which later saw combat service, 48 series production, three prototypes sent to the Luftwaffe for evaluation and one evaluation aircraft at the factory.

== Concepts and advanced projects ==
Mechanic Bruno Ferrari posing beside a Re.2005 at Reggio Emilia airfield 1944–1945.

A request by the German Ministry of Aviation led to one Re.2005 (MM.495), known as the Reggiane Re.2005 "LW", to be modified to German standards for tests in late July 1943. It was evaluated first in Guidonia and later at the Rechlin airfield. Tests revealed improved performances with speeds of up to 628 km/h (390 mph) with the FIAT engine and more than 650 km/h (400 mph) with the DB engine in level flight, without using war emergency power.

A prototype of the follow-on Re.2006 was almost completed before September 1943 but not flown. It was to use the DB 603 engine with 1,750 hp (1,300 kW) and had an estimated maximum speed of 740 km/h (460 mph). Only the G.56 was flown with this engine. A twin-fuselage version and a motorjet variant, the R.2005R were considered. On the R.2005R, speed could have been increased to 750 km/h (470 mph) but fuel consumption would have reached nearly 1,000 L/h (220 imp gal/h; 260 gal/h), almost four times the normal consumption of the Re.2005, at full throttle. This aircraft project was not considered as a serious alternative to the Re.2006.

== Operators ==
Germany

- Luftwaffe operated captured aircraft.

Kingdom of Italy

- Regia Aeronautica

Italian Social Republic

- Aeronautica Nazionale Repubblicana

== Surviving aircraft ==
No complete aircraft survive, but the rear fuselage of MM09235 is displayed at the Gianni Caproni Museum of Aeronautics in Trento, Trentino.

== Specifications ==

General characteristics

- Crew: 1
- Length: 8.73 m (28 ft 8 in)
- Wingspan: 11 m (36 ft 1 in)
- Height: 3.15 m (10 ft 4 in)
- Wing area: 20.4 m^{2} (220 sq ft)
- Airfoil: N-38
- Empty weight: 2,600 kg (5,732 lb)
- Gross weight: 3,610 kg (7,959 lb)
- Powerplant: 1 × Fiat RA.1050 R.C.58 Tifone V-12 inverted liquid-cooled piston engine 1,475 PS (1,455 hp; 1,085 kW)

(license built Daimler-Benz DB 605A-1)

- Propellers: 3-bladed constant-speed propeller

Performance

- Maximum speed: 628 km/h (390 mph, 339 kn) at 6,950 m (22,802 ft)
- Cruise speed: 515 km/h (320 mph, 278 kn)
- Stall speed: 155 km/h (96 mph, 84 kn)
- Range: 980 km (610 mi, 530 nmi) internal fuel

1,130 km (702 mi; 610 nmi) with 300 L (79 US gal; 66 imp gal) drop tank
1,270 km (789 mi; 686 nmi) with 300 L (79 US gal; 66 imp gal) drop tank + 2 × 150 L (40 US gal; 33 imp gal) drop tanks

- Service ceiling: 11,500 m (37,700 ft)
- Rate of climb: 20 m/s (3,900 ft/min)
- Wing loading: 177 kg/m^{2} (36 lb/sq ft) maximum

Armament

- Guns:
  - 2 × 12.7 mm (0.500 in) Breda-SAFAT machine guns in upper cowling (350 rpg);
  - 1 × 20 mm (0.8 in) MG 151 cannon firing through propeller hub (150 rpg);
  - 2 × 20 mm (0.8 in) MG 151 cannon in wings (200 rpg)
- Bombs:
  - Underfuselage (non standard) hardpoint 1,000 kg (2,200 lb) bomb or 1 × 300 L (66 imp gal; 79 US gal) drop tank
  - Hardpoints on wings: 160 kg (350 lb) bombs or 2 × 150 litres (33 imp gal; 40 US gal) drop tanks

== See also ==
Related development

- Reggiane Re.2000
- Reggiane Re.2001
- Reggiane Re.2002
- Reggiane Re.2003
- Reggiane Re.2004
- Reggiane Re.2006
- Reggiane Re.2007
- Reggiane Re.2008

Aircraft of comparable role, configuration, and era

- Fiat G.55
- Macchi C.205
- Messerschmitt Bf 109G
- North American P-51 Mustang

Related lists

- List of aircraft of World War II
- List of aircraft of Italy in World War II
