= Carlo Negri =

Italian pilot during World War II (1919 - 1943)

- Born: 26 September 1919; Genoa
- Died: 23 September 1943 (aged 23); Koritza, Albania
- Burial place: Musocco cemetery, Milan
- Military career
- Allegiance: Kingdom of Italy
- Branch: Regia Aeronautica, Italian Co-Belligerent Air Force
- Service years: ??-1943
- Rank: Sottotenente (Second Lieutenant) Pilota
- Unit: 4 Stormo
- Conflicts: Italian Campaign
- Awards: Gold Medal of Military Valor (posthumous)

Sottotenente Carlo Negri (26 September 1919 – 24 September 1943) was a World War II Italian pilot. He was the first casualty of the Italian Co-Belligerent Air Force, executed by firing squad by the Germans shortly after his capture.

== Biography ==
An engineering student before the war, Negri enlisted in the Regia Aeronautica in the course of the hostilities. After graduating from the Italian Air Force Academy in Caserta he was assigned to 4 Stormo (Prancing Stallion) as a Sottotenente (second Lieutenant) pilot.
He had not been in the unit for long when the Armistice between Italy and Allied armed forces was made public on 8 September 1943, ending hostilities between Italy and the Allies but de facto opening the war with their former allies.
Negri, together with most 4 Stormo personnel, flew to Apulia where the Royal Family had found a safe haven after fleeing from Rome. However, this "move" was not made for merely political reasons: the Stormo had very strong ties with Prince Amedeo, Duke of Aosta (and therefore with the House of Savoy) although Amedeo had left the command of the unit by the late 1930s to take up the place of Governor General of Italian East Africa and had died the year before as a POW of the British in Kenya. At any rate, Amedeo's legacy with 4 Stormo is so strong that the unit bears his name to the present day.
Shortly after, Regia Aeronautica (officially renamed Italian Co-Belligerent Air Force) was operational on the Allied side, flying ground attack and supply missions to relieve pressure on Regio Esercito units stuck in the Balkans and embedded in the local Resistance movements. In one such occasion, on 21 September 1943, Negri volunteered to drop a cylinder containing a message for an Italian unit encircled in Koritza, Albania. Hit by Flak, Negri was forced to land and was immediately captured by the Wehrmacht. Brought to a show trial, he was sentenced to death and shot on 23 September. He could not enjoy the protection of the Geneva Convention because there had not been any formal declaration of war between the Kingdom of Italy and Nazi Germany (which would take place only on 13 October 1943).

Sottotenente Carlo Negri received the posthumous Gold Medal of Military Valor for this action.

A little more than 60 years after his death (31 October 2003) 61 Stormo was named after him. This Italian Air Force Wing is based at Galatina, the same airbase from which Negri had taken off for his fateful flight. The dedication ceremony was attended by his nephew and namesake, manager Carlo Puri Negri, a holder of top offices in the Pirelli rubber and real estate company. As a matter of fact, the young officer was related to the well-known Italian industrial family by the side of his mother Margherita.

Every year the Pirelli family organizes a regatta, the Carlo Negri cup in his memory.

== Honors and awards ==
Gold Medal of Military Valor

== Bibliography ==
- Giulio Lazzati, Ali nella tragedia, Mursia, 1997.

== See also ==
Military history of Italy during World War II
