= FS Class D.341 =

Class D.341
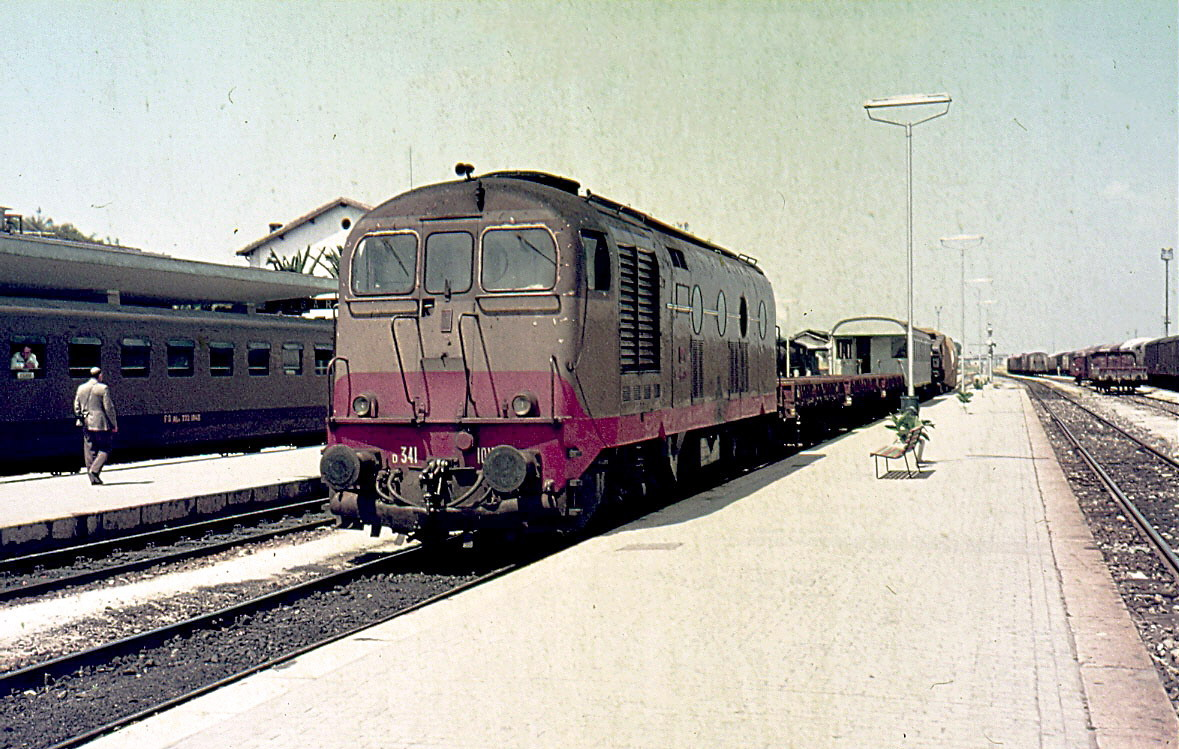
Type and origin
- Power type: Diesel
- Builder: FIAT Grandi Motori, Breda
- Build date: 1957-1963
- Total produced: 105
Specifications
- Configuration
  - UIC: Bo′Bo′
- Gauge: 1,435 mm (4 ft 8 1/2 in) standard gauge
- Wheelbase: 7.64 m (25 ft 3/4 in); Between bogie pivots
- Length: 14.54 m (47 ft 8 1/2 in)
- Width: 3 m (9 ft 10 1/8 in)
- Height: 4.275 m (14 ft 1/4 in)
- Loco weight: 66.5 t (65.4 long tons; 73.3 short tons)/ 67 t (66 long tons; 74 short tons)
- Fuel type: Diesel
- Transmission: Electric (ACEC)
Performance figures
- Maximum speed: 110 km/h (68 mph)
- Power output: 970 kW (1,300 hp)/ 1,030 kW (1,380 hp) (FIAT); 1,076 kW (1,443 hp) (Breda)
Career
- Operators: FS/Trenitalia and others

The FS Class D.341 is a class of diesel-electric locomotive used in Italy, introduced in the 1950s and still in service. Most of the remaining units are in service with La Ferroviaria Italiana (LFI).

== History ==
The D.341 were part of a post-World War II effort from the Italian state railways FS to replace their steam locomotives on non-electrified lines. They were designed in collaboration with Fiat and Breda and were produced in two series with different engines, depending from the manufacturer. The second series had a slightly different appearance. Two prototypes were also built by Ansaldo and Reggiane.

== Description ==
D.341 has two small cabs, one at each end, separated by a large compartment including the engine, the cooling devices and the transmission. The two engines were each V-12 engines coupled to a DC 450/700 V generator provided by Magneti Marelli for the FIAT locomotives, and by Breda or Ocren in the others. Power is fed to four electric motors having a maximum power of 177 kW (237 hp) each in the first series, and 192 kW (257 hp) in the second one.
