= Piaggio P.XIX =

1940s Italian aircraft piston engine

- Type: Air cooled radial
- National origin: Italy
- Manufacturer: Piaggio
- First run: 1940
- Major applications: Reggiane Re.2002
- Developed from: Piaggio P.XI

The Piaggio P.XIX was an Italian aircraft engine produced by Rinaldo Piaggio S.p.A. during World War II and used to power aircraft of the Regia Aeronautica.

== Development ==
The engine was part of a line of 14-cylinder radial engines developed from Piaggio based on the Gnome-Rhône Mistral Major, which was itself loosely based on the Bristol Jupiter. It was derived from the earlier P.XI but with a higher compression ratio.

== Variants ==
P.XIX R.C.45 Turbine
Geared, rated altitude 4,500 m (14,800 ft)
P.XIX R.C.50
Geared

== Applications ==
- CANT Z.1007ter
- Macchi MC.200bis prototype
- Reggiane Re.2002

The engine was also fitted experimentally to single versions of the IMAM Ro.57 and Savoia-Marchetti SM.82 (serial number MM.60591).

== Specifications (R.C. 45 Turbine) ==
Data from

=== General characteristics ===
- Type: 14-cylinder, two row, air cooled radial engine
- Bore: 146 mm (5 3/4 in)
- Stroke: 165 mm (6 1/2 in)
- Displacement: 38.6 L (2,356 in^{3})
- Diameter: 1,274 mm (50 1/4 in)

=== Components ===
- Valvetrain: 2 x overhead valves per cylinder operated by rockers and pushrods
- Supercharger: Centrifugal compressor
- Fuel type: 92 Octane petrol
- Cooling system: Air-cooled

=== Performance ===
- Power output:
  - Take-off: 1,085 hp (809 kW) at 2400 rpm
  - Cruise: 1,144 hp (853 kW) at 2400 rpm at 4,500 m (14,764 ft)
- Compression ratio: 7.0:1
- Specific fuel consumption: 235 g/(kW•h) (0.38 lb/(hp•h))

== See also ==
Comparable engines

- Alfa Romeo 135
- Bristol Taurus
- Fiat A.74
- Gnome-Rhône 14N
- Mitsubishi Kinsei
- Nakajima Sakae
- Pratt & Whitney R-1830 Twin Wasp
- Shvetsov ASh-82
- Tumansky M-88

Related lists

- List of aircraft engines
