= Italian Co-belligerent Air Force =

Air force of the Royalist government of Italy during the last years of World War II

- The cockade of Italy, identification symbol of ACI, similar to World War I and the modern Aeronautica Militare
- Active: October 1943 – 1945
- Country: Kingdom of Italy
- Type: Air Force
- Nickname: "Air Force of the South"
- Engagements: World War II: Yugoslavia

The Italian Co-Belligerent Air Force (Aviazione Cobelligerante Italiana, or ACI), or Air Force of the South (Aeronautica del Sud), was the air force of the Royalist "Badoglio government" in Southern Italy during the last years of World War II. The ACI was formed in Southern Italy in October 1943 after the Italian Armistice in September. As by this point the Italian Kingdom had defected from the Axis and had declared war on Germany, the ACI pilots flew for the Allies.

== Description ==
A small part of the Italian Royal Air Force (Regia Aeronautica) remained under German control. This was known as the National Republican Air Force (Aeronautica Nazionale Repubblicana, or ANR), ostensibly part of the forces of Benito Mussolini's Fascist state in northern Italy, the Italian Social Republic (Repubblica Sociale Italiana). The ANR pilots flew with the Axis.

By the end of 1943, 281 Italian warplanes had landed at Allied airfields, but most were no longer useful for combat. The crews of these aircraft were re-equipped with Allied aircraft and engaged in transport, escort, reconnaissance, sea rescue, and limited tactical ground support operations flying 11,000 missions from 1943 to 1945.

The ACI never operated over Italian territory, its objectives being always in the Balkans (Yugoslavia or Albania). This was to avoid any possible encounter between Italian-crewed aircraft fighting on opposite sides. During the entire history of ACI, no encounter, let alone combat, was ever reported between ACI and ANR aircraft.

The ACI formed the basis of the post-war Air Force of the Italian Republic (Aeronautica Militare Italiana).

== Units ==
- 2°Gruppo, 3°Stormo Trasporto, Aeronautica Cobelligerante del Sud, Lecce-Galatina, Southern Italy, November 1944
- 10°Gruppo, 4°Stormo, Aeronautica Cobelligerante del Sud, Lecce-Galatina (Bell P-39 Airacobra)
- 351^, 352^, 353^ e 360^ Squadriglia, 20° Gruppo, 51° Stormo, Palata (Spitfire Mk Vc)
- 28°Gruppo, Stormo Baltimore, Southern Italy (Martin Baltimore)
- 239^ Squadriglia, 102° Gruppo, 5° Stormo, Palata (Reggiane Re.2002)
- 84^, 90^ e 91^ Squadriglia, 10° Gruppo, 4° Stormo, Palata (Macchi C.202, Macchi C.205)
- 155° Gruppo Caccia Terrestre, Palata (Macchi C.202, Macchi C.205)
- 386^ Squadriglia, 21° Gruppo Caccia, Palata (Macchi C.202)
- 97^ Squadriglia, 9° Gruppo, 4° Stormo, Nuova (Macchi C.205)
- 238^ Squadriglia, 101° Gruppo, 5° Stormo, Nuova (Reggiane Re.2001, Reggiane Re.2002)
- 149^ Squadriglia, 82° Gruppo Idrovolanti, Idroscalo San Nicola Varano (CANT Z.506)

== Notable members ==
- Carlo Emanuele Buscaglia
- Carlo Negri
- Vittorio Sanseverino

== Aircraft ==
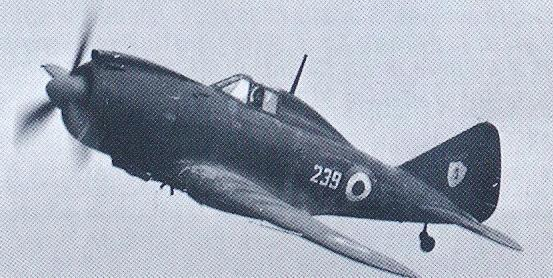
A Reggiane Re.2002 of the 293ª Squadriglia of the Italian Co-Belligerent Air Force

- Ambrosini SAI.2S
- AVIA FL.3
- Breda Ba.25
- Breda Ba.39
- Bell P-39Q Airacobra
- Bell P-39N Airacobra
- CANT Z.501 Gabbiano
- CANT Z.506B Airone
- CANT Z.1007bis Alcione
- CANT Z.1018 Leone
- Caproni Ca.133
- Caproni Ca.164
- Caproni-Bergamaschi Ca.310 Libeccio
- Caproni Ca.314
- Fiat BR.20M Cicogna
- Fiat CR.32bis
- Fiat CR.42 AS Falco
- Fiat G.8
- Fiat G.12T
- Fiat G.50bis Freccia
- Fiat RS.14B
- Macchi MC.200 Saetta
- Macchi MC.202 Folgore
- Macchi MC.205V Veltro
- Martin A-30 Baltimore III
- Nardi FN.305
- Reggiane Re.2001 Serie III Falco II
- Reggiane Re.2002 Ariete
- SAIMAN 200
- SAIMAN 202
- Savoia-Marchetti SM.75 Marsupiale
- Savoia-Marchetti SM.79 Sparviero
- Savoia-Marchetti SM.81 Pipistrello
- Savoia-Marchetti SM.82
- Savoia-Marchetti SM.84
- Spitfire LF Mk VB

== See also ==
- Military history of Italy during World War II
- Pietro Badoglio
- Co-belligerence
- Regia Aeronautica (Italian Royal Air Force 1923–1943)
- Aeronautica Nazionale Repubblicana (Pro-Axis Air Force 1943–1945)
- Aeronautica Militare (Post-war Italian Air Force 1945–present)
- Italian Co-Belligerent Navy
- Italian Co-Belligerent Army
