= Reggiane =

Italian manufacturing company

Officine Meccaniche Reggiane SpA
- Type: Subsidiary
- Industry: Heavy equipment
- Founded: 1901; 125 years ago
- Defunct: 2010
- Headquarters: Italy
- Products: Machinery
- Website: Reggiane Cranes and Plants S.p.A.

Officine Meccaniche Reggiane SpA (commonly referred to as Reggiane) was an Italian industrial manufacturer and aviation company.

Reggiane was founded during 1904 by its parent company Caproni, which was in turn owned by the aeronautical engineer Giovanni Battista Caproni. Throughout the company's existence, it was involved in numerous industrial activities, such as railways, agriculture, aeronautics, and processing machinery. During the first half of the Twentieth Century, Reggiane became well known for the design and production of aircraft. Through the development of the Re.2000, an all-metal monoplane, Reggiane gained a reputation for producing relatively agile single-seat fighter aircraft.

Following the outbreak of the Second World War, the majority of Reggiane's fighter production was taken over by the Regia Aeronautica (the Italian Air Force). However, the company continued to manufacture and deliver fighters for various other neutral and Axis-aligned nations around this period, such as for the Luftwaffe of Nazi Germany, the Hungarian Air Force and the Swedish Air Force. Following the end of the war, the company turned its back on aircraft production, instead focusing upon the civil sector. Throughout the second half of the century, Reggiane came to specialise in the supply of cranes and other dockside equipment.

== History ==
The company established its main facilities in Reggio Emilia, a city of what today is the Emilia-Romagna region of Italy. At its height, Reggiane's factory in the city was the fourth largest in Italy, its footprint covering an area as large as the center of Reggio Emilia, employing as many as 11,000 employees at a time. It was primarily through this plant that Reggiane performed its various industrial activities, becoming involved in the nations's railways, manufacturing a number of locomotives, as well as the agricultural sector, producing a range of food processing equipment.

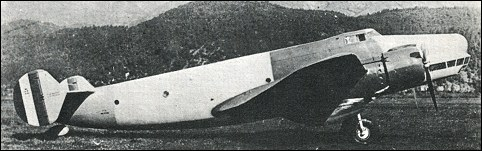
A Piaggio P.32

During the 1930s, the company branched out into aircraft production; the first aircraft to be produced by the firm was the Piaggio P.32bis, a medium bomber, which had been developed from the Caproni Ca.405C Procellaria. However, Reggiane's management were keen to branch out into developing their own aircraft designs, rather than solely producing other company's aircraft under license.

During 1938, work commenced at Reggiane on a new fighter design; the company's design team, which was headed by Roberto Longhi and Antonio Alessio, set about designing an aircraft that would be offered to the Italian Air Ministry that would not only meet but exceed the requirements of its Programme R. Having little development time available, Reggiane considered various options, including the potential for manufacturing an American-developed fighter aircraft under license instead; however, under the influence of aeronautical engineer Giovanni Battista Caproni, a completely original design was rapidly prepared. The design team took inspiration from the contemporary American fighter Seversky P-35; their resulting design, the Reggiane Re.2000, bore a superficial resemblance to the P-35. It was the first aircraft to be designed by Reggiane to employ aluminum stressed skin construction, as opposed to the wooden or mixed wood and metal structures that had been traditionally used in contemporary Italian aircraft such as the Savoia-Marchetti SM.79, another aircraft which had also been produced by Reggiane under license.

On 24 May 1939, the prototype Re.2000 conducted its maiden flight at Reggio Emilia, Emilia-Romagna, Italy, flown by Mario De Bernardi. According to Cattaneo, early flights had quickly demonstrated the type's favourable flying attitude, including good speed and high manoeuvrability. Only minor modifications were required after the successful completion of the initial factory flight test programme; these including changes to the exhaust, the lengthening of the carburetor air intake, and the replacement of the round windshield with a framed counterpart. During testing, the Re 2000 demonstrated the ability to perform better than other existing fighters then in production. In mock dogfights, it could successfully fight not only the slower Fiat CR.42 biplane, but even the more modern Macchi C 200 and the German Messerschmitt Bf 109E fighters. However, the Re.2000 was afflicted by a major handicap in the form of the unavailability of reliable in-line engines of sufficient power; as such, the RE.2000 was able to represent only a limited advance over the rival Macchi C.200.

Throughout the Second World War, the company would develop numerous improved variants of the Re.2000, including the Re.2001, Re.2002, Re.2003, Re.2004, Re.2005, and Re.2006, some of which never progressed beyond the stages of prototyping or limited production. It has been alleged that the Reggiane had been working on developing their own wartime jet-propelled fighter, the Re.2007; however, some figures have cast doubts over the authenticity of the documentation produced.

=== Postwar activities ===
Following the conclusion of the conflict, Reggiane's factory was occupied by a large contingent of its work force, during which time its works were converted for to produce goods orientated towards the civilian market instead. This industrial action followed a pattern similar to the nationwide wave of factory occupations of the years 1920–1921.

The company, which is currently still active (though with a name and a location different from the original, due to the changes of ownership and name), specializes in the production of cranes and trolleys for lifting containers. The company was taken over first by the group Fantuzzi (Fantuzzi Reggiane) and then acquired by American company Terex Corporation's Material Handling & Port Solutions (MHPS) business. On 16 May 2016, Finland's Konecranes Oyj announced an agreement to acquire Terex's MHPS segment, and the acquisition was completed on 4 January 2017. Konecranes continues to own the Fantuzzi Reggiane brand and provides official support and genuine spare parts for Fantuzzi Reggiane port equipment.

== Products ==
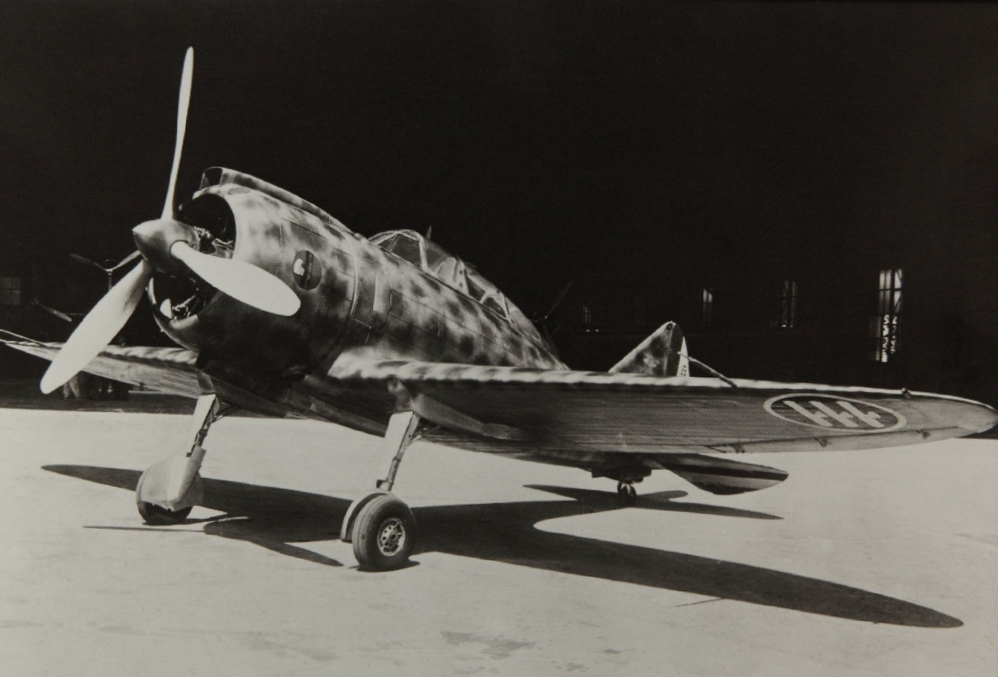
Re.2000

Re.2005

=== Aircraft production ===
- Reggiane Re.2000 Falco
- Reggiane Re.2001 Falco II
- Reggiane Re.2002 Ariete
- Reggiane Re.2003
- Reggiane Re.2004
- Reggiane Re.2005 Bifusoliera
- Reggiane Re.2005 Sagittario
- Reggiane Re.2006
- Reggiane Re.2007
- Reggiane Re.2008
- Caproni-Reggiane Ca.400
- Caproni-Reggiane Ca.8000

=== Locomotives ===
- FS Class D.341
- FS Class E.428
- FS Class E.636
- FS Class E.656
- FS Class E.424

== See also ==
- Caproni
- Compagnia Nazionale Aeronautica
- Isotta Fraschini

== Sources ==
- Angelucci, Enzo and Paolo Matricardi. World Aircraft: World War II, Volume I (Sampson Low Guides). Maidenhead, UK: Sampson Low, 1978. ISBN 0-562-00096-8.
- Cattaneo, Gianni. The Reggiane Re.2000 (Aircraft in Profile Number 123). Windsor, Berkshire, UK: Profile Publications Ltd., 1967. No ISBN.
- Green, William and Gordon Swanborough. "RE 2000... The 'State-of-the-Art' Reggiane". Air Enthusiast, Forty-one, Midsummer 1990, pp. 54–69. Bromley, UK: Tri-Service Press. ISSN 0143-5450.
