= Caproni-Reggiane Ca.8000 =

Italian seaplane airliner proposal

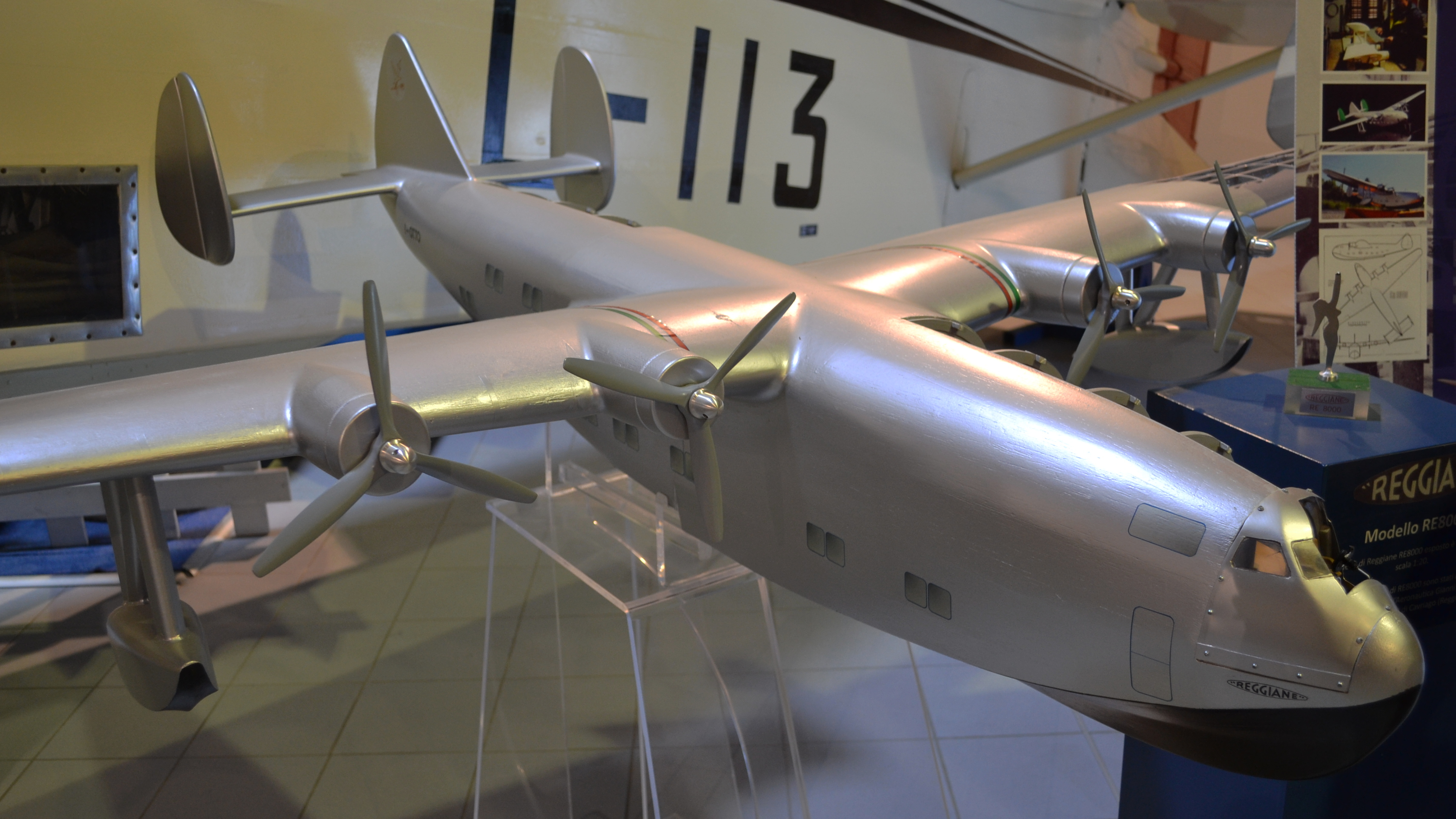
- Scale model of the Ca.8000

General information
- Type: Seaplane
- National origin: Italy
- Manufacturer: Caproni-Reggiane
- Status: Cancelled
- Number built: 0

The Caproni-Reggiane Ca.8000 was a four-engine seaplane passenger transport aircraft project for transatlantic crossings.

== History ==
The project started in 1944, imagining the post-war commercial scenario. The project was started in the Reggiane technical office at that time in Clanezzo, Bergamo. The feasibility studies were carried out by the designers until the end of the conflict, so for business strategies any aeronautical industrial project was abandoned and with it also the development of the Ca.8000 that was at an advanced development point. In fact, the construction of two first prototypes was scheduled for the summer of 1946.

=== Development ===
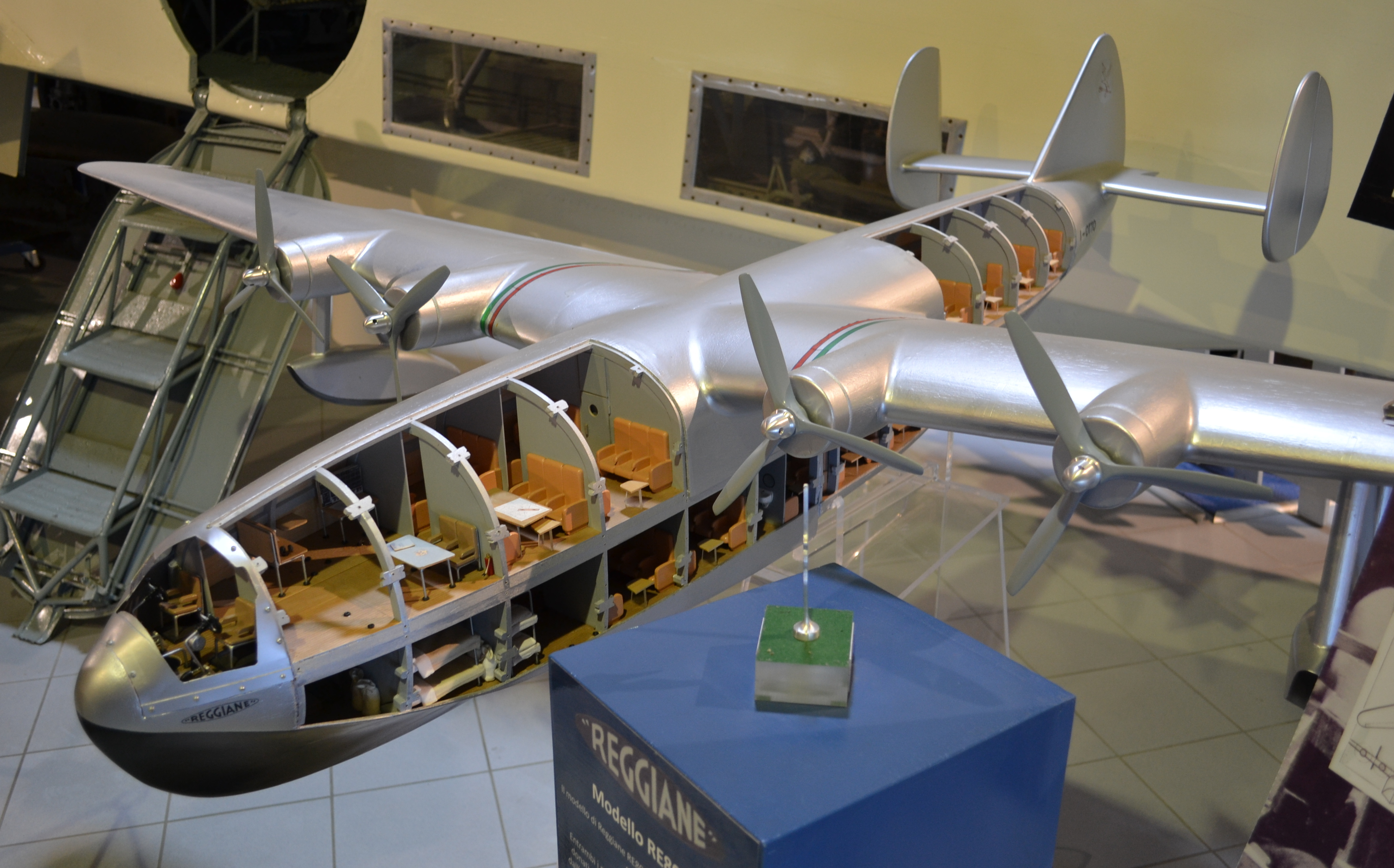
Cutaway model showing the proposed interior layout.

The Ca.8000 was to have been of entirely metallic construction, with fuel tanks in watertight wings. Designed to offer luxurious accommodation, the fuselage was divided in two decks, with beds in sleeping compartments and seats for 52 passengers; whilst for day flights the cabins sat 76, with ten crew members. Facilities on-board included a restaurant, bar and meeting room, . The Ca.8000 was designed with four 3,000 hp (2,200 kW) Pratt & Whitney R-4360 Wasp Major engines, high-wing with retractable wing floats, and a triple vertical stabilizer.

== Bibliography ==
- Longhi, Roberto (n.d.). "Reggiane and I... a Fighter Designer Recalls". Air Enthusiast Quarterly (2): 214–224. ISSN 0143-5450.
