= Reggiane Re.2002 Ariete =

Attack aircraft model by Reggiane

Re.2002
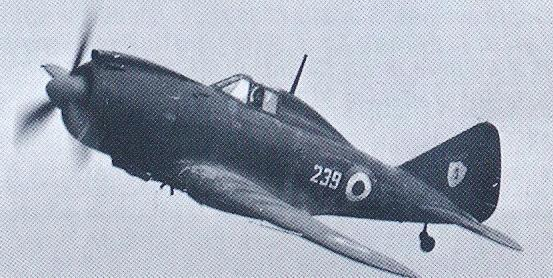
- A Reggiane Re 2002 of the 293ª Squadriglia of the Italian Co-Belligerent Air Force

General information
- Type: Fighter-bomber
- Manufacturer: Reggiane
- Primary users: Regia Aeronautica Luftwaffe
- Number built: 225

History
- Introduction date: March 1942
- First flight: October 1940
- Variant: Reggiane Re.2003

The Reggiane Re.2002 Ariete ("Ram") is an Italian fighter-bomber developed during World War II. The aircraft was a further development of the Re.2000, with some of the modifications that already had been introduced in the Re.2001. The aircraft was mainly used by the Regia Aeronautica (Royal [Italian] Air Force), but it also saw limited use with the German Luftwaffe, who used it against the French resistance.

== Design and development ==
The Re.2002 project began with the conversion of the Re.2000 to Regia Aeronautica specifications including a redesigned wing and conventional fuel tanks. A contract for a single conversion resulted in the Reggiane company using this as the basis of a new aircraft. The Re.2002 was designed by Roberto Longhi and Antonio Alessio, who took a modified and strengthened Re.2000 fuselage, mated to Re.2001 wings and a more powerful radial engine, the Piaggio P.XIX R.C.45 Turbine (1,175 hp). The decision to go back to radial engines was partly made due to the difficulty in obtaining German made Daimler-Benz DB 601 engines and Longhi's preference for radial engines.

The first prototype flew in October 1940, approximately three months after the Re.2001. The evaluation period showed some reliability problems with the Piaggio engine and therefore the aircraft served primarily as an attack aircraft instead, as it could carry a considerable payload, by Italian standards.

== Operational history ==
In September 1941, the Italian Air Force ordered 200 aircraft, delivery of which began in March 1942. The aircraft equipped the 5° Stormo and 50° Stormo, although the engine problems hadn't been fully solved. The first batch of 100 aircraft were delivered by July 1943, but only part of the second batch was delivered before the armistice with the Allies.

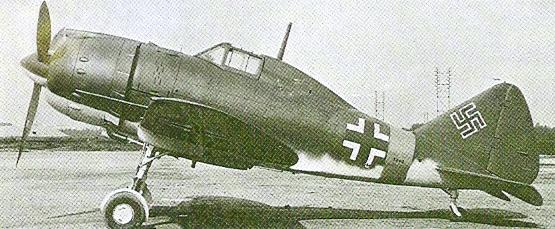
A Reggiane Re 2002 at Taliedo in early 1945, bearing German markings in preparation for delivery to a German Luftwaffe Schlachtgruppe

The squadrons equipped with Re.2002s saw a great deal of action with the Allied landings in Sicily although they also suffered many losses. During the first four days, when the Italian Air Force tried to attack allied ships, 14 aircraft were destroyed by British Spitfire Mk Vs. The Re.2002s damaged several allied ships, among them the British battleship HMS Nelson, that was forced to withdraw to the port of Malta for repairs. Allied bombing raids and strafing of airfields destroyed many aircraft on the ground. Due to the lack of fuel, the Re.2002s were only used sporadically, often equipped with one 250 kg and two 160 kg bombs.

Some of the last skirmishes against the Allies took place on September 3, 1943, when the British 8th Army landed at Calabria. Fifteen Re.2002s from 5° Stormo attacked the landing force. Three pilots were killed; among them was Giuseppe Cenni, the commander of the unit. After the Armistice with the Allies, the Re.2002 was used in the Italian Co-belligerant Air Force. They bombed German ships en route to Corfu and saw action against German troops in the island of Cefalonia.

The Germans had shown interest in buying 300 Re.2002s before the Armistice. They planned to use the German produced BMW 801 radial engine in order to eliminate the deficiencies with the Piaggio engine, but Reggiane could not satisfy the demand, and none were delivered. However, some 40 "factory-fresh" Re.2002s along with 20 aircraft requisitioned from operational stocks were taken over by the Germans after the Italian armistice, and used against the French resistance. Some Re.2002s were used by units that fought on the Axis side after the Italian Government surrendered to the Allies.

== Variants ==
There were some improvement studies, e.g. Re.2002 with Re.2005 wings, 18 examples of a dive bomber version were also made, one prototype was fitted with a Daimler-Benz DB 601 engine, and there was also a torpedo bomber prototype.

The Reggiane Re.2003 reconnaissance aircraft was derived from the Re.2002.

== Operators ==
Germany

- Luftwaffe

Kingdom of Italy

- Regia Aeronautica
- Italian Co-Belligerent Air Force

== Preserved aircraft ==
One Re 2002 (serial number MM8669) is on display at the Italian Air Force Museum at Vigna di Valle, having been restored to display condition in 2017. The restored fuselage of a Luftwaffe Re.2002 is on display as a monument for the resistance in the French city of Limoges.

== Specifications (Re.2002) ==
Data from Caproni Reggiane Re 2001 Falco II, Re 2002 Ariete & Re 2005 Sagittario

General characteristics

- Crew: 1
- Length: 8.16 m (26 ft 9 in)
- Wingspan: 11.0 m (36 ft 1 in)
- Height: 3.15 m (10 ft 4 in)
- Wing area: 20.4 m^{2} (220 sq ft)
- Airfoil: N-38
- Empty weight: 2,390 kg (5,269 lb)
- Max takeoff weight: 3,240 kg (7,143 lb)
- Powerplant: 1 × Piaggio P.XIX R.C.45 Turbine 14-cylinder air-cooled supercharged radial piston engine, 876 kW (1,175 hp)
- Propellers: 3-bladed Piaggio constant-speed propeller

Performance

- Maximum speed: 530 km/h (330 mph, 290 kn) at 5,500 m (18,000 ft)
- Cruise speed: 400 km/h (250 mph, 220 kn) at 4,500 m (14,800 ft)
- Stall speed: 120 km/h (75 mph, 65 kn) (flaps down)
- Range: 1,100 km (680 mi, 590 nmi) at 6,000 m (20,000 ft) and 417 km/h (259 mph; 225 kn)
- Service ceiling: 11,000 m (36,000 ft)
- Time to altitude: 8 min 48 s to 6,000 m (20,000 ft)

Armament

- Guns:

- 2 × 12.7 mm Breda-SAFAT machine guns
- 2 × 7.7 mm Breda-SAFAT machine guns

- Bombs:

- 650 kg (1,430 lb) on three hard points

== See also ==
Related development

- Reggiane Re.2001
- Reggiane Re.2003
- Reggiane Re.2005

Related lists

- List of aircraft of World War II
