= Italian battleship Italia =

Italia was the name of two Italian battleships, and may refer to:

- Italian ironclad Italia, an ironclad battleship completed in 1885 and stricken in 1921
- Italian battleship Italia (1943), a fast battleship completed in 1940 as Littorio, renamed Italia in 1943, and stricken in 1948
