= Piaggio P.XI =

Aircraft radial engine

P.XI
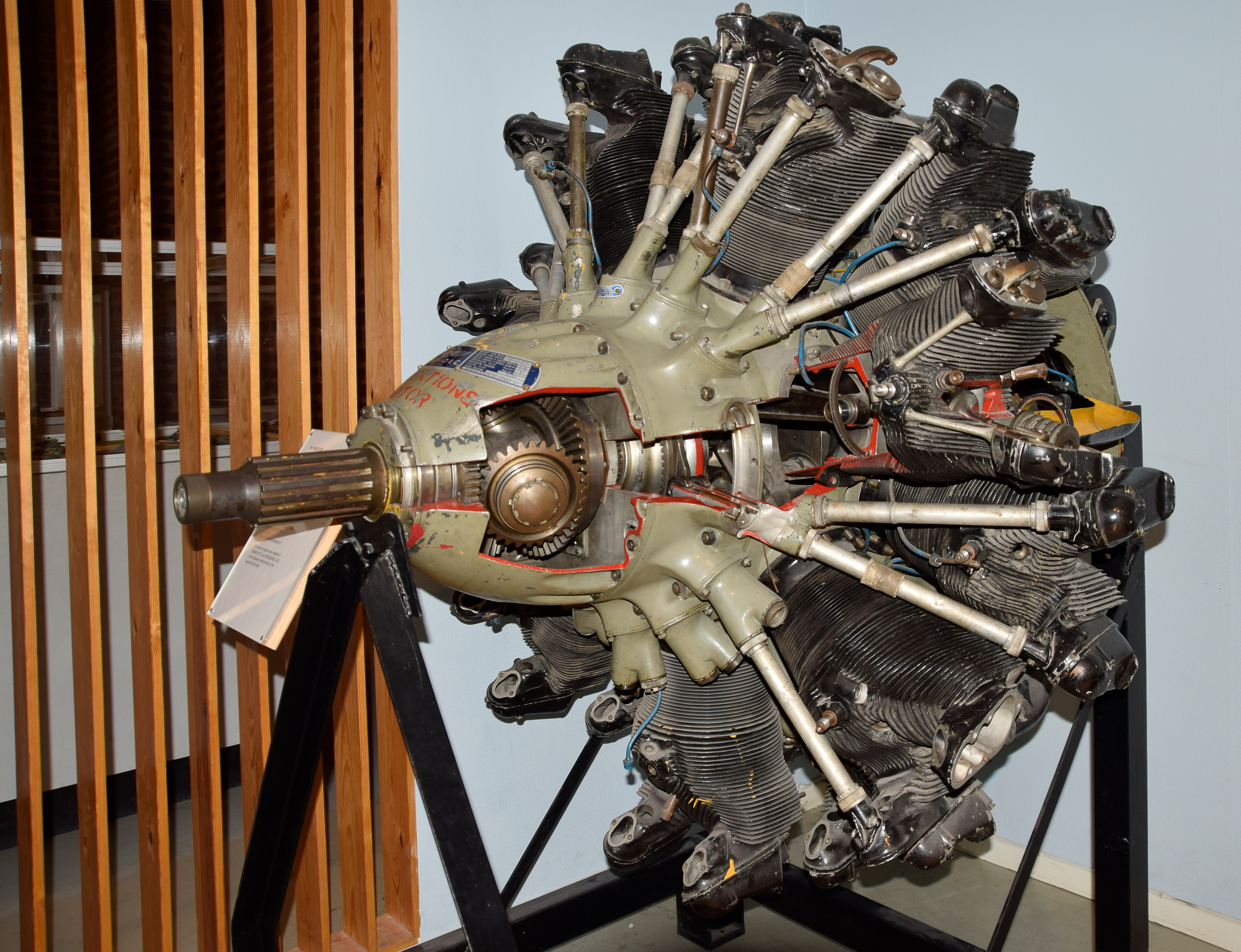
- Preserved Piaggio P.XI
- Type: Radial engine
- Manufacturer: Piaggio
- Developed from: Gnome-Rhône Mistral Major

The Piaggio P.XI was an Italian 14-cylinder radial aircraft engine. The P.XI was a licensed derivative of the French Gnome-Rhône Mistral Major 14K produced in Italy.

Further development led to the P.XIX. This featured an increased compression ratio from 6:1 to 7:1 and an rpm increase from 2,400 to 2,600.

== Variants ==
P.XI
P.XIbis
P.XI R.C.15
(geared, rated altitude 1,500 m (4,900 ft))
P.XI R.C.30
(geared, rated altitude 3,000 m (9,800 ft))
P.XI R.C.40D
P.XI R.C.40S
740 kW (1,000 PS) (geared, rated altitude 4,000 m (13,000 ft)), opposite rotation to 40D.
P.XI R.C.40bis
(geared, rated altitude 4,000 m (13,000 ft))
P.XI R.2C.40
740 kW (1,000 PS), (geared, rated altitude 4,000 m (13,000 ft)), two-speed supercharger.
P.XI C.40
(direct drive, rated altitude 4,000 m (13,000 ft))
P.XI R.C.44
(geared, rated altitude 4,400 m (14,400 ft))
P.XI R.C.50
(geared, rated altitude 5,000 m (16,000 ft))
P.XI R.C.60
(geared, rated altitude 6,000 m (20,000 ft))
P.XI R.C.72
(geared, rated altitude 7,200 m (23,600 ft))
P.XI R.C.100
P.XI R.C.100/2v
(geared, rated altitude 10,000 m (33,000 ft))

== Applications ==
- Breda Ba.65
- Breda Ba.88
- CANT Z.516
- CANT Z.1007
- Caproni Ca.135
- Caproni Ca.161
- Reggiane Re 2000
- Saab 17C
- Savoia-Marchetti SM.79B
- Savoia-Marchetti SM.84

== Specifications (P.XI R.C.40) ==
Data from Italian Civil & Military Aircraft 1930-1945 and Aircraft Engines of the World 1945.

=== General characteristics ===
- Type: 14-cylinder radial engine
- Bore: 146 mm (5.75 in)
- Stroke: 165 mm (6.50 in)
- Displacement: 38.6 L (2,356 cu in)
- Length: 1,700 mm (66.9 in)
- Diameter: 1,328 mm (52.3 in)
- Dry weight: 650 kg (1,433 lb)
- Frontal Area: 1.39 m^{2} (15.0 sq ft)

=== Components ===
- Valvetrain: 2 x overhead valves per cylinder operated by rockers and pushrods
- Supercharger: Centrifugal compressor, geared to 7.9:1
- Fuel system: 1 x Piaggio T2-100 dual downdraught carburettor with automatic boost and mixture control
- Fuel type: 87 octane
- Oil system: Pressure fed at 483 kPa (70 psi), dry sump
- Cooling system: Air
- Reduction gear: Epicyclic reduction gear ratio 0.62:1
- Starter: Garelli compressed air starter
- Ignition: 2 x Marelli MF14 magnetos, 2 x spark plugs per cylinder fed by a shielded ignition harness.

=== Performance ===
- Power output:
- Take-off: 1,000 PS (735 kW) at 2,200rpm
- Military: 1,000 PS (735 kW) at 2,200rpm at 4,000 m (13,000 ft)
- Cruising: 1,000 PS (735 kW) at 1,800rpm at 4,000 m (13,000 ft)
- Specific power: 19.1 kW/L (0.49 hp/cu in)
- Compression ratio: 6.0:1
- Specific fuel consumption: 0.292 kg/kW/hr (0.48 lb/hp/hr)
- Oil consumption: 0.0134 kg/k/w/hr (0.022 lb/hp/hr)
- Power-to-weight ratio: 1.15 kW/kg (0.699 hp/lb)

== See also ==
Related development

- Gnome-Rhône Mistral Major
- Piaggio P.XIX

Related lists

- List of aircraft engines
