= Reggiane Re.2003 =

Italian fighter bomber

Re.2003
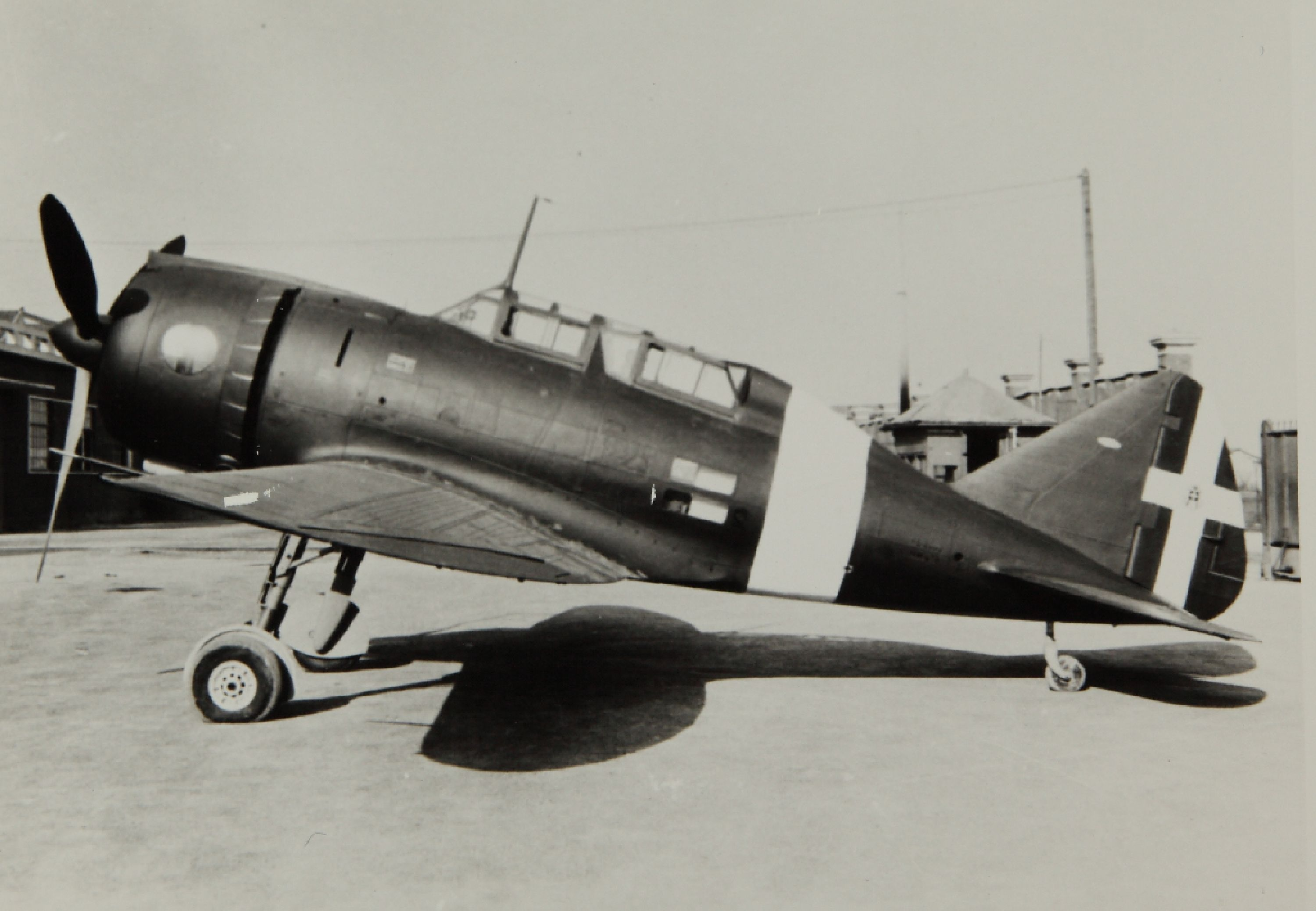

General information
- Type: Reconnaissance
- National origin: Italy
- Manufacturer: Reggiane
- Status: Retired
- Primary user: Regia Aeronautica
- Number built: 2

History
- First flight: 29 June 1941
- Developed from: Reggiane Re.2000

The Reggiane Re.2003 was a development from the Reggiane Re.2000 fighter bomber that first flew on 29 June 1941. It was designed to replace the outdated IMAM Ro.37 used at the time for observation purposes. Unlike the Re.2000, it had room for a second crewman who sat behind the pilot. It was equipped with onboard camera equipment. The Fiat A.74 RC.38 engine was intended to be used originally, but the Piaggio P. XI RC 40 bis was chosen instead. Only two prototypes were completed. The Regia Aeronautica (Italian Air Force) made an order of 200, but cancelled the order as Allied bombing raids made the Air Force's focus switch to fighter aircraft.

== Development and design ==
In 1941, after experience of the opening months of the Western Desert campaign of the Second World War showed that the IMAM Ro.37 biplane used by Italy as an observation aircraft, was unfit for front line use, the Regia Aeronautica required a replacement with superior performance, and chose a two seat derivative of the Reggiane Re.2000 to meet this requirement. The resulting aircraft, the Re.2003, was a low-wing cantilever monoplane of all-metal construction with a retractable tailwheel undercarriage. It was powered by a single Piaggio P.XI R.C.40 bis radial engine rated at 1,000 hp (750 kW) which drove a three-bladed propeller. Pilot and observer sat in tandem in an enclosed cockpit.

The first prototype, serial number MM 478 was converted from a production Re.2000 and retained the five-spar wing with integral fuel tanks of the earlier fighter, although these fuel tanks had been rejected by the Italian Ministry of Aviation on the Re.2000 owing to concerns about potential leaks and vulnerability to battle damage, and it was planned to use more conventional independent fuel tanks for any production aircraft. Armament was two sychronised 12.7 mm machine guns mounted above the engine cowing and firing through the propeller disc.

The first prototype made its first flight on 29 July 1941. An order for a second prototype (MM 12415), to be followed by 200 production prototype, was placed on 16 December 1941. These would be based on the Reggiane Re.2002, although the Piaggio P.XI R.C.40 bis engine was retained. Armament was two 12.7 mm Breda-SAFAT machine guns above the engine and two 7.7 mm guns mounted in the wings, with a hardpoint for a 500 kilograms (1,100 lb) bomb or drop tank under the fuselage and for two bombs of up to 160 kg (350 lb) under the wings. The Re.2003 was not a high priority, slowing development, and the second prototype did not fly until 13 October 1942. By December 1942, the state of the war meant that production resources had to be concentrated on more urgently needed types, and the production order was revised to 198 Re.2002 attack aircraft and only two Re.2003s. Construction of the two production Re.2003s was stopped in 1943, and they were never completed.

== Operational history ==
At the time of the announcement of the Armistice between Italy and the Allies on 8 September 1943, the first prototype was serving with a squadron at Sarzana. It was later used at taliedo for conversion training of German pilots onto Reggiane 2002s that were being built for the Luftwaffe. No records are available of any use of the second prototype after flight testing.

== Specifications (2nd prototype) ==
Data from Dal Re 2002 al Re 2005: Storia degli aerei Reggiane Gruppo Caproni

General characteristics

- Crew: 2
- Length: 8.08 m (26 ft 6 in)
- Wingspan: 11.00 m (36 ft 1 in)
- Height: 3.20 m (10 ft 6 in)
- Wing area: 20.40 m^{2} (219.6 sq ft)
- Aspect ratio: 6.0:1
- Airfoil: N-38
- Empty weight: 2,470 kg (5,445 lb)
- Gross weight: 3,320 kg (7,319 lb)
- Fuel capacity: 474 L (125 US gal; 104 imp gal)
- Powerplant: 1 × Piaggio P.XI R.C.40 bis 14-cylinder air-cooled radial piston engine, 750 kW (1,000 hp) at 4,000 m (13,000 ft)
- Propellers: 3-bladed Piaggio metal variable-pitch propeller

Performance

- Maximum speed: 475 km/h (295 mph, 256 kn) at 4,900 m (16,100 ft)
- Cruise speed: 340 km/h (210 mph, 180 kn)
- Stall speed: 115 km/h (71 mph, 62 kn)
- Range: 720 km (450 mi, 390 nmi)
- Service ceiling: 10,500 m (34,400 ft)
- Time to altitude: 4 min 20 s to 4,000 m (13,000 ft)

Armament

- Guns: 2 × 12.7 mm Breda-SAFAT machine guns, 2 × 7.7 mm Breda-SAFAT machine guns
- Bombs: Up to 500 kg (1,100 lb) of bombs

== See also ==
Related development

- Reggiane Re.2000
- Reggiane Re.2002

== Bibliography ==
- Brindley, John F. (1973). "Caproni Reggiane Re 2001 Falco II, Re 2002 Ariete & Re 2005 Sagittario". Aircraft in Profile. Vol. 13. Windsor, Berkshire, UK: Profile Publications Ltd. pp. 217–241. ISBN 0-85383-022-3.
- Brotzu, E.; Caso, M.; Cosolo, G., eds. (1973). Dimensione Cielo, Aerei Italiani nella 2ª Guerra Mondiale: 6: Bombardieri Ricognitore (in Italian). Rome: Edizioni Bizzari.
- Caliaro, Lugino (2025). Reggiane Fighters. Crécy Publishing. ISBN 978-1-80035-352-7.
- Govi, Sergio (1984). Dal Re 2002 al Re 2005: Storia degli aerei Reggiane Gruppo Caproni. Milan: Giorgio Apostolo Editore.
- Longhi, Roberto (n.d.). "Reggiane and I... a Fighter Designer Recalls". Air Enthusiast Quarterly. No. 2. pp. 214–224. ISSN 0143-5450.
