= Reggiane Re.2004 =

Italian proposed fighter-bomber aircraft

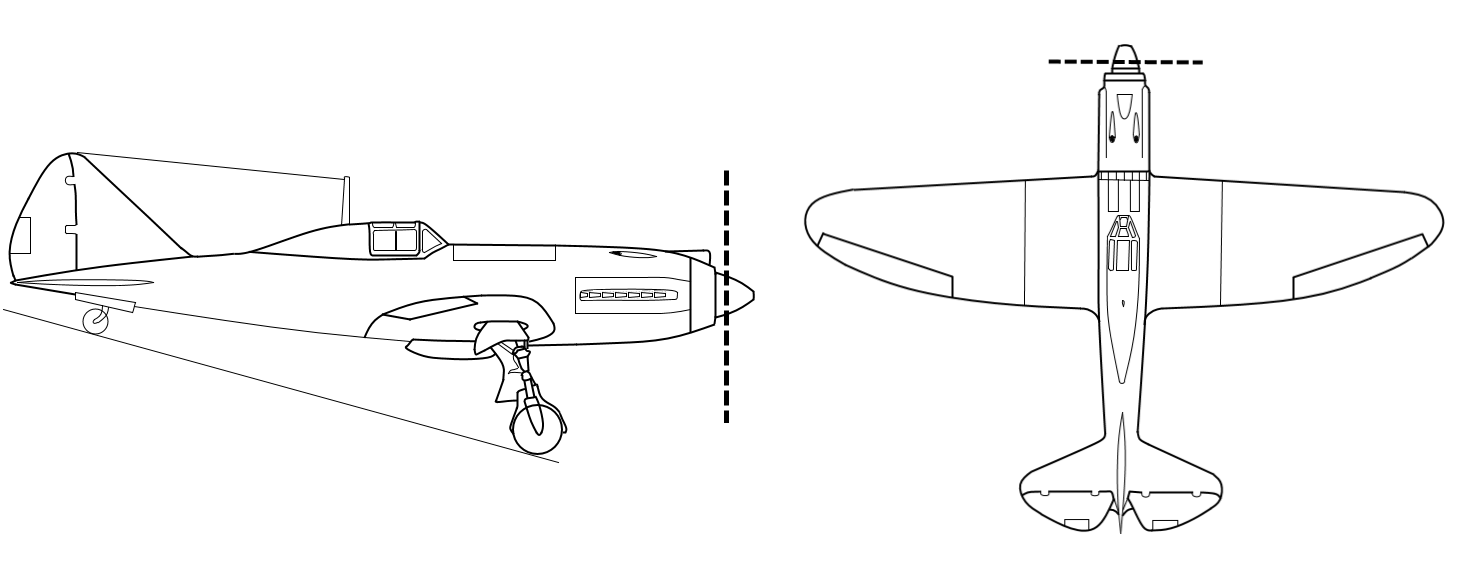
- Re.2004

General information
- Type: Fighter-bomber
- National origin: Italy
- Manufacturer: Reggiane
- Number built: 1

The Reggiane Re.2004 was an Italian single-engined monoplane made by Reggiane and designed by Roberto Longhi. The aircraft never passed the preliminary stages.

== Design and development ==
The Re.2004 had identical fuselage, wings and other components to the Re.2005. The Re.2004 was powered by an air-cooled Isotta Fraschini Zeta RC 24/60 engine, with 24 cylinders arranged in an X-pattern, producing 1,250 hp (932 kW).

In 1942, a prototype was built, and ten models were ordered; the order was later cancelled due to unresolved engine overheating problems. However, by this time, the Re.2005 had been completed.

== Specifications ==
General characteristics

- Crew: one
- Length: 8.35 m (27 ft 5 in)
- Wingspan: 11 m (36 ft 1 in)
- Height: 3.15 m (10 ft 4 in)
- Wing area: 20.4 m^{2} (220 sq ft)
- Max takeoff weight: 3,282 kg (7,236 lb)
- Powerplant: 1 × Isotta Fraschini Zeta R.C.24/60 X-24 air-cooled piston engine, 930 kW (1,250 hp)

Performance

- Maximum speed: 620 km/h (390 mph, 330 kn)
- Range: 1,000 km (620 mi, 540 nmi)

Armament

- Guns:
  - 3 × MG 151/20 cannons
  - 2 × 12.7mm Breda-SAFAT machine guns
- Bombs: 1,000 kg (2,205 lb) of bombs
