= Reggiane Re.2007 =

Italian jet fighter concept

Re.2007
- Re.2007 artwork

General information
- Type: Fighter aircraft
- National origin: Italy
- Manufacturer: Reggiane
- Designer: Roberto Longhi
- Status: Concept only

The Reggiane Re.2007 was a purported Italian fighter aircraft concept designed in 1943 by Roberto Longhi.

== Design ==
Roberto Longhi, one of the most prominent Reggiane aircraft designers, in a letter to the Italian aviation magazine JP4, dated May 1976, stated that Regia Aeronautica Major Antonio Ferri asked him to study an engine option for the Reggiane Re.2005. The requirement was to install a supplemental Fiat A.20 engine behind the cockpit, driving a compressor, in order to improve the Daimler-Benz DB 605 main engine output, giving the airplane a speed of 750 kilometres per hour (400 kn) above 8,000 metres (26,000 ft). It was also planned to use a tail exhaust to achieve more thrust, effectively creating a Motorjet The proposal was filed as "Re.2005 R" by Regia Aeronautica, but remained only a paper project, as, according to Longhi, the aircraft would have had problems with its center of gravity.

One possible alternative method of propulsion to the motorjet to was to obtain turbojet engines from Germany, but despite requests from Antonio Alessio and Count Giovanni Battista Caproni, the Germans delivered only a wooden mock-up for dimensional tests to Reggiane.

After the war, Longhi tried to conduct experiments with two Junkers Jumo 004 engines that were left in Udine airport after the German defeat. These extremely valuable jet engines were delivered to Italy in 1945 as spare parts for a Luftwaffe high speed reconnaissance flight, equipped with three Arado Ar 234 Blitz, when the nearly impossible to intercept German twin-jet planes participated in the Italian campaign. Unfortunately for Reggiane's designers, the engines were purchased by Angelo Ambrosini, another Italian aircraft manufacturer.

Some Re.2007 drawings were made after the war by airplane designer Pellizzola. These drawings were speculative reconstructions derived from a Reggiane engineer's description. The drawings portrayed the aircraft as an advanced jet fighter, complete with futuristic (for 1943) swept wings, which only became common on fighter planes in the 1950s, although the Germans had used them on both the Messerschmitt Me 262 and Me 163.

Rumours about a partially built airframe with technical sketches, both sent to the United Kingdom and the United States for studies, were published in some Italian books and magazines, but are now considered highly improbable. Most modern scholars now consider the Re.2007 to not have been a real design; instead being merely a "phantom" of sorts, cobbled together from various projects by faulty recollection.

== Variants ==
- Re.2008, a proposed further development of the Re.2007 with a wing sweep of 33°.

== Bibliography ==
- Caliaro, Lugino (2025). Reggiane Fighters. Crécy Publishing. ISBN 978-1-80035-352-7.
- Longhi, Roberto (n.d.). "Reggiane and I... a Fighter Designer Recalls". Air Enthusiast Quarterly (2): 214–224. ISSN 0143-5450.
