= HMS Kent (54) =

County-class heavy cruiser built in the late 1920s

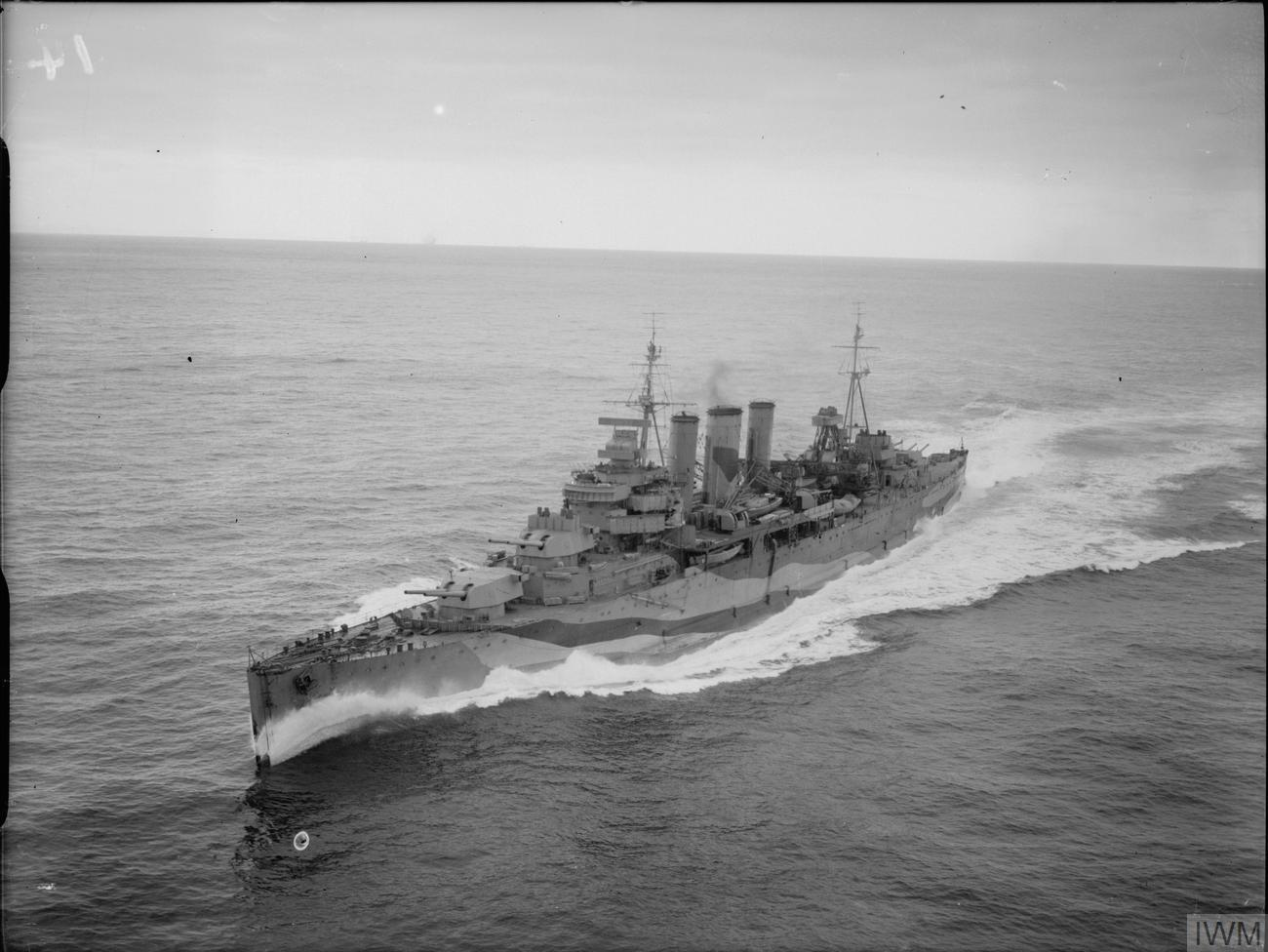

History

United Kingdom
- Name: Kent
- Namesake: Kent
- Builder: Chatham Dockyard
- Laid down: 15 November 1924
- Launched: 16 March 1926
- Commissioned: 25 June 1928
- Identification: Pennant number: 54
- Fate: Sold for scrap, 22 January 1948

General characteristics (as built)
- Class & type: County-class heavy cruiser
- Displacement: 9,850 long tons (10,010 t) (standard load); 13,520 long tons (13,740 t) (deep load)
- Length: 630 ft (192.0 m)
- Beam: 68 ft 5 in (20.9 m)
- Draught: 20 ft 6 in (6.2 m)
- Installed power: 80,000 shp (60,000 kW)
- Propulsion: 4 shafts, Parsons geared steam turbines; 8 Admiralty 3-drum water-tube boilers
- Speed: 31.5 knots (58.3 km/h; 36.2 mph)
- Range: 13,300 nmi (24,600 km; 15,300 mi) at 12 knots (22 km/h; 14 mph)
- Complement: 784
- Armament: 4 × twin 8-inch (203 mm) guns; 4 × single QF 4-inch (102 mm) Mk V anti-aircraft (AA) guns; 4 × single 2-pounder (40 mm) AA guns; 2 × quadruple 21 inch (533 mm) torpedo tubes
- Armour: Belt: 1 in (25 mm); Decks: 1.375–1.5 in (34.9–38.1 mm); Barbettes: 1 in (25 mm); Turret: 1 in (25 mm); Bulkheads: 1 in (25 mm); Magazines: 2–4.375 in (50.8–111.1 mm)

HMS Kent, pennant number 54, was a County-class heavy cruiser built for the Royal Navy in the late 1920s. She was the lead ship of the Kent subclass. After completion, the ship was sent to the China Station, where she remained until the beginning of the Second World War, aside from a major refit in 1937–38. Kent hunted the German pocket battleship Admiral Graf Spee in the East Indies in late 1939 and then was reassigned to troop convoy escort duties in the Indian Ocean in early 1940. She was transferred to the Mediterranean in mid-1940, but was torpedoed shortly after arriving. The ship was under repair for a year and was then assigned to Home Fleet, where she escorted convoys to and from North Russia for the next several years. In mid-1944, Kent escorted British aircraft carriers as their aircraft made attacks on German shipping and airfields in Norway. A few months later, she was flagship of a force that intercepted a German convoy in Norwegian waters and sank two freighters and five escorts. The ship was paid off in early 1945 and placed in reserve until she was used as a target. Kent was sold for scrap in 1948.

== Description ==
Kent displaced 9,850 long tons (10,010 t) at standard load and 13,520 long tons (13,740 t) at deep load. The ship had an overall length of 630 feet (192.0 m), a beam of 68 feet 5 inches (20.9 m), and a draught of 20 feet 6 inches (6.2 m). She was powered by Parsons geared steam turbines, driving four shafts, which developed a total of 80,000 shaft horsepower (60,000 kW) and gave a maximum speed of 31.5 knots (58.3 km/h; 36.2 mph). Steam for the turbines was provided by eight Admiralty three-drum water-tube boilers. Kent carried a maximum of 3,425 long tons (3,480 t) of fuel oil that gave her a range of 13,300 nautical miles (24,600 km; 15,300 mi) at 12 knots (22 km/h; 14 mph). The ship's complement was 784 officers and men.

The ship mounted eight 50-calibre 8-inch (203 mm) guns in four twin gun turrets. Her secondary armament consisted of four QF 4-inch (102 mm) Mk V antiaircraft (AA) guns in single mounts. Kent mounted four single 2-pounder (40 mm) light AA guns ("pom-poms"). The ship carried two quadruple torpedo tube above-water mounts for 21-inch (533 mm) torpedoes.

Kent was only lightly protected with little more than a single inch of plating protecting vital machinery. Her magazines were the exception and were protected by 2–4.375 inches (50.8–111.1 mm) of armour. Space and weight were reserved for one aircraft catapult and its seaplane, but they were not fitted until after she was completed.

== History ==
Kent was built by Chatham Dockyard and laid down on 15 November 1924. She was launched on 16 March 1926 and commissioned 25 June 1928. The ship was assigned to the 5th Cruiser Squadron on the China Station and spent the bulk of the interbellum period there. In 1929–30, she received a high-angle control system, used to direct her AA guns, and an aircraft catapult was also fitted. Her AA armament was reinforced by the addition of two single 4-inch guns abreast the forward funnel in 1932–33.

In January 1934, while serving as the flagship of Admiral Sir Frederick Dreyer, she attended the Far Eastern Naval Conference in Singapore together with Terror, Veteran, Wren and Eagle. At the conclusion of the conference, Dreyer transferred his flag to the Suffolk and Kent was dispatched to the United Kingdom for a refit. During the 1934 refit two quadruple Vickers .50-calibre (12.7 mm) Mark III machine guns were added.

In 1937, Kent returned to Chatham and underwent a major refit, which included a 4.5-inch (114 mm) Krupp cemented armour belt abreast the engine and boiler rooms as well as the dynamo room and the fire control transmitting station. This belt extended 6 feet (1.8 m) down from the lower deck. Four inches of armour were also added to protect the sides of the boiler room fan compartments. The ship's aft director was moved to a pedestal abaft the searchlight tower that replaced the original aft control station. Two octuple-barrel 2-pounder mounts were added abreast the searchlight tower. The changes raised the ship's displacement by 74 long tons (75 t) and cost an estimated £161,000. Unlike her sister ships, no aircraft hangar was added because that would have pushed her over the Washington Naval Treaty limits, but her catapult was replaced with a more powerful one capable of handling the heavier Supermarine Walrus flying boat.

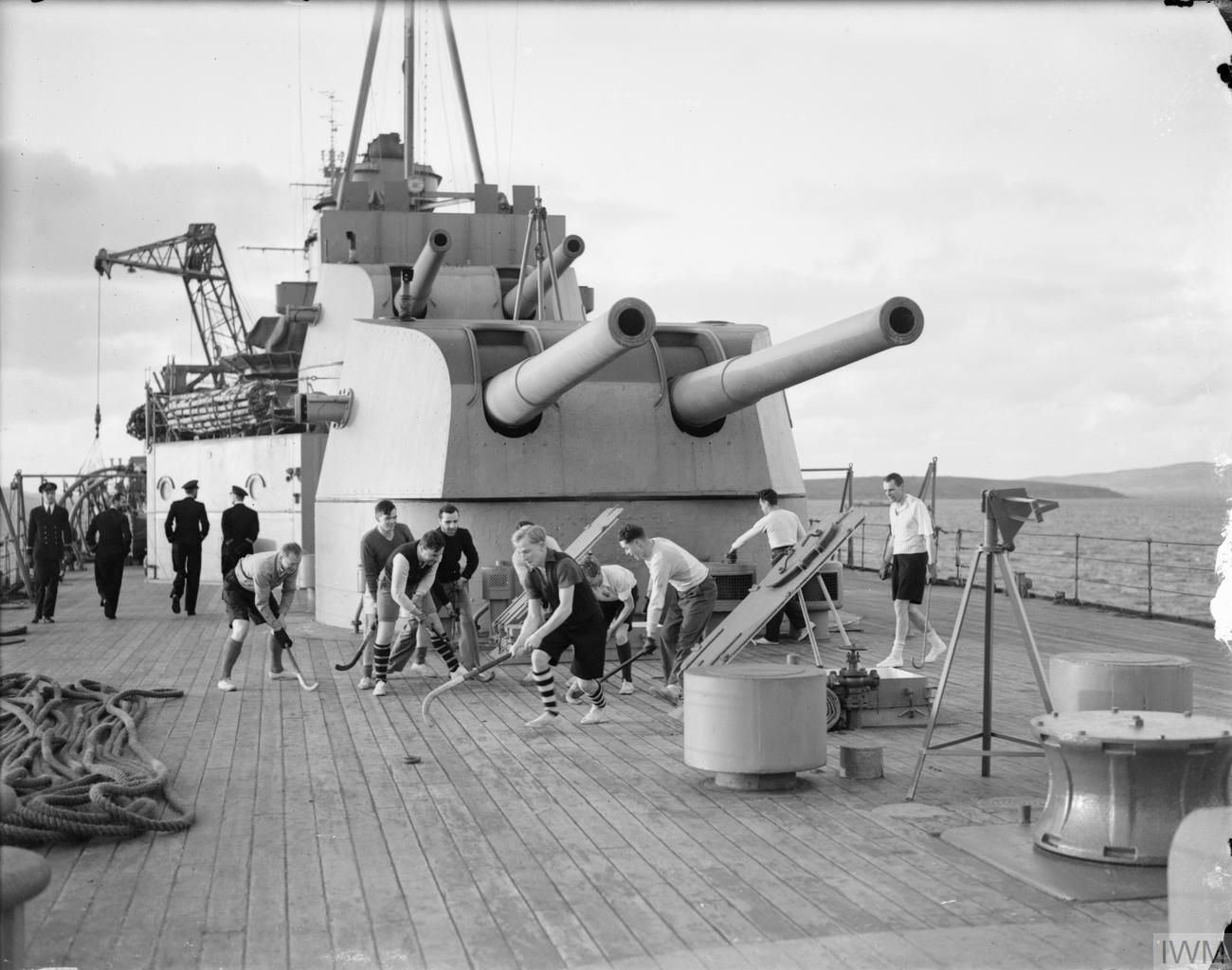
Officers of HMS Kent enjoying a free-for-all game of deck hockey under the shadow of the cruiser's 8-inch guns: Whenever possible, the game is played for exercise each afternoon both at sea and in port.

In November 1939, she joined with the French heavy cruiser Suffren and the Australian destroyers Voyager and Vampire to hunt for the German pocket battleship Admiral Graf Spee in the East Indies and then was reassigned to escort troop convoys in the Indian Ocean in January 1940.

Following the declaration of war by Italy, she was transferred to the Mediterranean Fleet, arriving at Alexandria in August 1940 with the 3rd Cruiser Squadron. On 17 August 1940, Kent, the battleships Warspite, Malaya, Ramillies, and 12 destroyers bombarded Italian positions near Bardia and Fort Capuzzo. Two weeks later, the ship participated in Operation Hats, escorting a convoy from Alexandria to Malta.

On 15 September 1940, the battleship Valiant, the aircraft carrier Illustrious, Kent, the antiaircraft cruisers Calcutta and Coventry, and seven destroyers left Alexandria bound for Benghazi. During the night of 16/17 September 1940, aircraft from the Illustrious mined the harbour of Benghazi. They also attacked shipping in the harbour with torpedoes and bombs, sinking two destroyers and two merchant ships. Kent and two destroyers were detached to bombard Bardia while returning to Alexandria. During the night of 17/18 September 1940, the ship was hit in the stern by a torpedo from Italian Savoia-Marchetti SM.79 bombers from the 279th Independent Torpedo Squadron (Italian: Squadriglia Autonoma Aerosiluranti) led by Carlo Emanuele Buscaglia. She was towed back to base by the destroyers with great difficulty.

Kent was given temporary repairs at Alexandria from 19 September to 18 October to allow her to return to the United Kingdom. Extensive repairs at Devonport Dockyard followed from 1 January to 20 September 1941. During this time, six Oerlikon 20 mm light AA guns were added and the ship received a variety of radars. These included Type 284 radar for surface gunnery control, Type 285 AA gunnery radar, and a Type 281 air-warning radar. When her repairs were completed in September 1941, she spent several months working up. On 8 December, Kent sailed from Scapa Flow carrying British Foreign Secretary Anthony Eden and Soviet Ambassador to Great Britain Ivan Maisky. She reached Murmansk on 12 December, where the diplomats disembarked to meet with Joseph Stalin. Kent sortied on 17 December, with two Soviet destroyers, in a failed attempt to intercept the German 8th Destroyer Flotilla that was engaging two British minesweepers attempting to rendezvous with Convoy PQ 6. The ship brought Eden back home by 29 December.

The cruiser was assigned to the Home Fleet and escorted convoys to and from North Russia. She briefly escorted Convoy QP 8 on the return leg from Russia in March 1942 and provided distant cover for Convoy QP 10 the following month. Kent attempted to rendezvous with the damaged light cruiser Trinidad west of Bear Island as she returned from Murmansk in May, but Trinidad was sunk by German aircraft before that could happen. On 21 May, the ship joined Convoy PQ 16 as part of the close escort.

After her return from the Soviet Union, the ship was refitted in Liverpool from 18 July to 7 November. Her catapult and four .50-calibre machine guns were removed and six more single 20 mm Oerlikon guns were added. In early January 1943, the cruiser provided cover for Convoy RA 51 and several weeks later Convoy JW 52. While on the latter mission, Kent was unsuccessfully attacked by the German submarine U-625. During a brief refit between 22 September and 4 October at Chatham Dockyard, the ship exchanged six single 20 mm guns for three twin 20 mm gun mounts. In November, she provided cover to Convoys RA 54A, JW 54A, and JW 54B. The ship covered the outbound Convoy JW 56A and JW 56B and the returning Convoy RA 56 in January–February 1944. The following month, Kent was part of the covering force for Convoy JW 57.

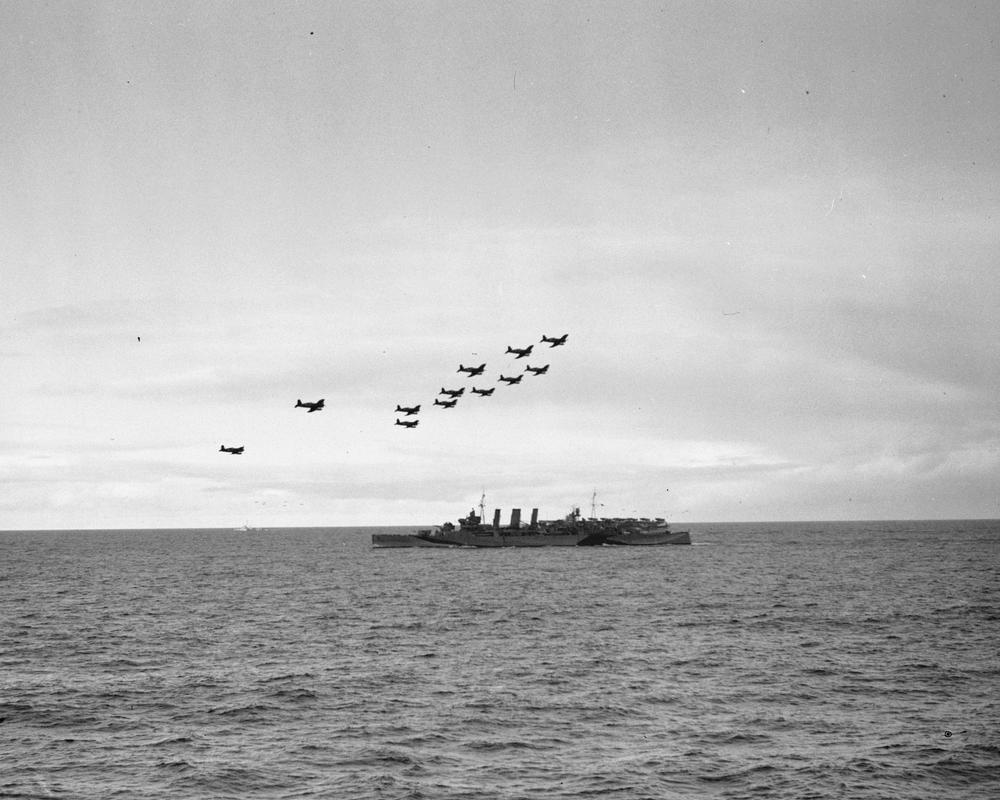
Thirteen Chance-Vought Corsairs flying in formation over HMS Kent during Operation Goodwood, as seen from the escort carrier Trumpeter

On 17 July 1944, the ship was formed part of the covering force protecting three British aircraft carriers flying off aircraft to attack the German battleship Tirpitz during Operation Mascot. Kent escorted three aircraft carriers that attacked the German airfield at Kristiansand on 10 August. She escorted two carriers on 12 September, while their aircraft attacked German shipping near Stadlandet. On the night of 13/14 November 1944, as flagship of Rear-Admiral Rhoderick McGrigor during Operation Counterblast, the ship, with the light cruiser Bellona and four destroyers, attacked Convoy KS.357 off Listerfjord, south-east of Egersund, Norway. The convoy consisted of four freighters escorted by the minesweepers M.416 and M.427 and four submarine chasers. Opening fire at 2300 hr, the cruisers and destroyers sank two of the freighters and all the escorts above except one unidentified vessel.

With the naval war in the Atlantic winding down, the ship's age and material condition and a shortage of crews to man her, Kent was paid off in January 1945 and remained in reserve for several years until she was used as a target. The ship was struck off the Naval List (the first of the County class to go) and allocated to BISCO on 22 January 1948 and arrived at Troon on 31 January to be broken up by West of Scotland Shipbreakers.

Footage shot by a crew member in the period 1941-45 was discovered in the archives of the Cinema Museum in London.
