= Carlo Emanuele Buscaglia =

Italian World War II pilot

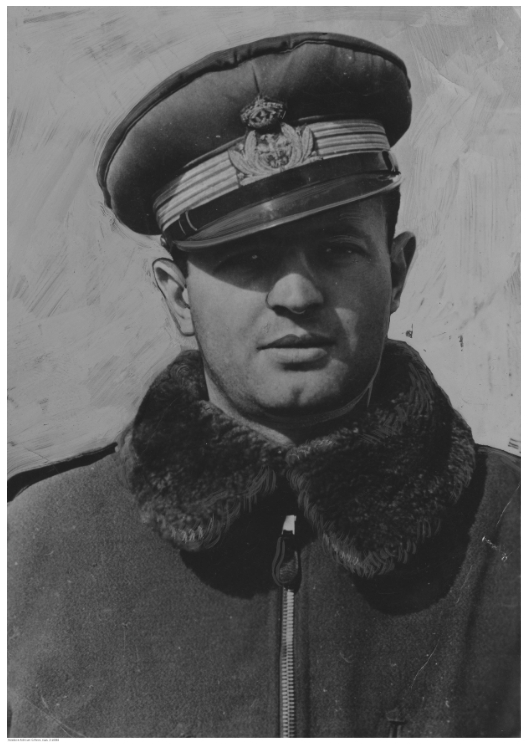
- Portrait of Buscaglia mid-1943
- Born: 22 September 1915; Novara, Kingdom of Italy
- Died: 24 August 1944 (aged 28); Naples, Kingdom of Italy
- Military career
- Allegiance: Kingdom of Italy
- Branch: Regia Aeronautica
- Service years: 1934-1944
- Rank: Major
- Units: 281ª Squadriglia, 132º Gruppo and XXVIII Gruppo
- Conflicts: World War II; Battle of the Mediterranean
- Awards: Gold Medal of Military Valor; Silver Medal of Military Valor; Iron Cross 2nd class

Carlo Emanuele Buscaglia (22 September 1915 – 24 August 1944) was an Italian aviator and one of the most famous Italian pilots of World War II.

== Biography ==
Buscaglia was born in Novara, Piedmont, in 1915 and entered the Italian Accademia Aeronautica (Air Force Academy) in October 1934. In 1937, he was made Sottotenente (2nd Lieutenant).

On 1 July 1937, Buscaglia was assigned to the 50th Squadron (32nd Bomber Wing), then equipped with the obsolete Savoia-Marchetti S.M.81, but later replaced with the more efficient SM.79. In 1939, he was promoted to full Lieutenant. The following February, he was transferred to the 252nd Squadron (46th Bomber Wing), and with this unit, he took part in his first military mission on 21 June 1940.

On 25 July, he volunteered to join the Reparto Speciale Aerosiluranti ("Special Torpedo-Bomber Detachment") of the Regia Aeronautica, later renamed the 240th Torpedo-Bomber Squadron, based in Libya. On the night of 17 September 1940, Buscaglia obtained his first success with a torpedo-armed SM.79, heavily damaging the cruiser HMS Kent. In early December, he also successfully attacked the cruiser HMS Glasgow.

In January 1941, Buscaglia's unit was transferred to Catania, from where he took part in the action with some German Ju 87s in which the carrier HMS Illustrious was badly damaged. Promoted to captain, Buscaglia was made commander of a new torpedo unit, the 281st Squadron, based at the Grottaglie airport in Apulia. From there, he took part in the Battle of Cape Matapan.

By 1942, Buscaglia had already obtained the Silver Medal of Military Valor five times, and the German Iron Cross second class. In April, he was selected to command the new 132nd Torpedo Group, subsequently sinking several ships in the Mediterranean. On 12 August of that year, together with the German ace Hans-Joachim Marseille, he was received in Rome by Benito Mussolini, who promoted him to major.

On 12 November 1942, during an action against the Allied invasion of North Africa, Buscaglia's aircraft was shot down by a British Spitfire. He was declared "killed in action" and a Gold Medal of Military Valor was awarded posthumously. However, although wounded and badly burned, Buscaglia had survived, having been captured by Allied troops and transferred to a prisoner-of-war camp in the United States at Fort Meade.

After the armistice of 8 September 1943, Buscaglia was asked to fight alongside the Allies, as a member of the newly formed Aeronautica Cobelligerante del Sud. In the meantime, in the northern part of Italy still occupied by Germany, a wing of the Aeronautica Nazionale Repubblicana (the Air Force of the puppet Italian Social Republic), the 1° Gruppo Aerosiluranti, was named after him.

On 15 July 1944, Buscaglia assumed command of the 28th Bomber Wing, equipped with Martin Baltimores and based on Campo Vesuvio airport, near Naples. On 23 August, while attempting to fly one of the new aircraft without an instructor, Buscaglia crashed on take-off. He died the following day in a hospital in Naples.

The 3rd Wing of the current Aeronautica Militare Italiana, based at Villafranca di Verona, was named after him.

== Bibliography ==
- Evangelisti, Giorgio; Aichner, Martino (1969). Storia degli aerosiluranti italiani e del Gruppo Buscaglia. Longanesi.
- Aichner, Martino (1973). Il Gruppo Buscaglia. Aerosiluranti italiani nella Seconda Guerra Mondiale. Mursia Editore.
- Enciclopedia dell'Aviazione. Novara: EDIPEM. 1978.
- Molteni, Mirko (2012). L'aviazione italiana 1940-1945. Azioni belliche e scelte operative. Bologna: Odoya. ISBN 978-88-6288-144-9.
- Rossi, Euro (2006). Nido d'aquile. Storia dell'Aeronautica nell'Agro Pontino (2 ed.). H.E.-Herald Editore. ISBN 88-89672-12-9.
