= Savoia-Marchetti SM.79 Sparviero =

Italian heavy bomber airplane

SM.79 Sparviero
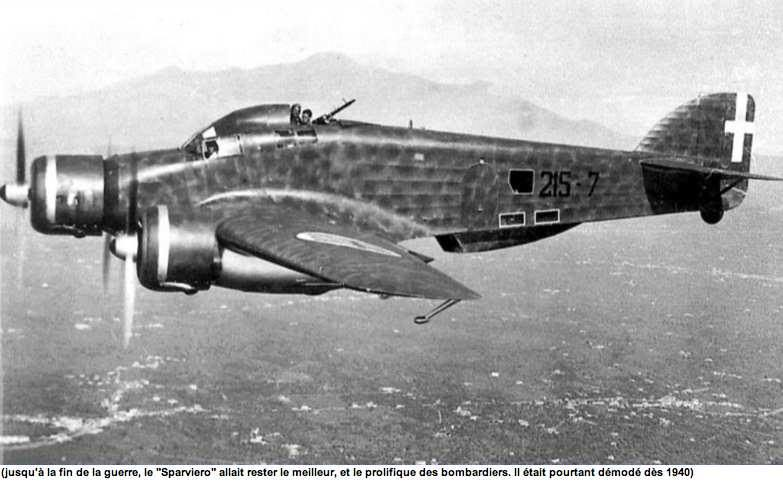

General information
- Type: Heavy bomber, torpedo bomber, transport aircraft
- National origin: Italy
- Manufacturer: Savoia-Marchetti
- Status: Retired
- Primary users: Regia Aeronautica: Aeronautica Nazionale Repubblicana; Royal Romanian Air Force; Spanish Air Force
- Number built: 1,240

History
- Manufactured: 1936–1945
- Introduction date: 1936
- First flight: 28 September 1934
- Retired: 1952 (Italian Air Force); 1959 (Lebanese Air Force)
- Variant: IAR 79
- Developed into: Savoia-Marchetti SM.84

The Savoia-Marchetti SM.79 Sparviero (Italian for sparrowhawk) is a three-engined heavy bomber developed and manufactured by the Italian aviation company Savoia-Marchetti. It may be the best-known Italian aeroplane of the Second World War. The SM.79 was easily recognizable due to its fuselage's distinctive dorsal "hump", and was reportedly well liked by its crews. British propaganda claimed its crews nicknamed it il gobbo maledetto ("damned hunchback").

The SM.79 was developed in the early 1930s. It is a cantilever low-wing monoplane of combined wood and metal construction, designed as a fast eight-passenger transport aircraft, but its potential as a combat aircraft soon attracted the attention of the Italian government. It made its first flight on 28 September 1934 and early examples established 26 world records between 1937 and 1939, making it the fastest bomber in the world. As such, the SM.79 was regarded as an item of national prestige in Fascist Italy, attracting significant government support and often being used for propaganda.The aircraft was routinely entered in competitions and air races, and it often won.

The SM.79 first saw combat during the Spanish Civil War. It normally operated without fighter escort, relying on its speed to evade interception. The SM.79's performance during the Spanish deployment was successful and drove demand for the type, including a decision to adopt it as the backbone of Italy's bomber units. Both Yugoslavia and Romania bought examples for their own air services, while large numbers entered Regia Aeronautica service. Almost 600 SM.79-I and –II aircraft were in service when Italy entered the Second World War in May 1940. They were deployed in every theatre in which the Italians fought.

The SM.79 was used in various roles during the Second World War, initially as a heavy bomber and transport aircraft. Following pioneering work by the "Special Aerotorpedoes Unit", Italy used them as torpedo bombers. In this role, the SM.79 achieved notable successes against Allied shipping in the Mediterranean theatre. A specialised drone of the aircraft flown by remote control was also developed, although the Armistice with Italy ended plans for operations. It was the most numerous Italian bomber of the Second World War, with about 1,300 built. Examples remained in Italian service until 1952.

== Development ==
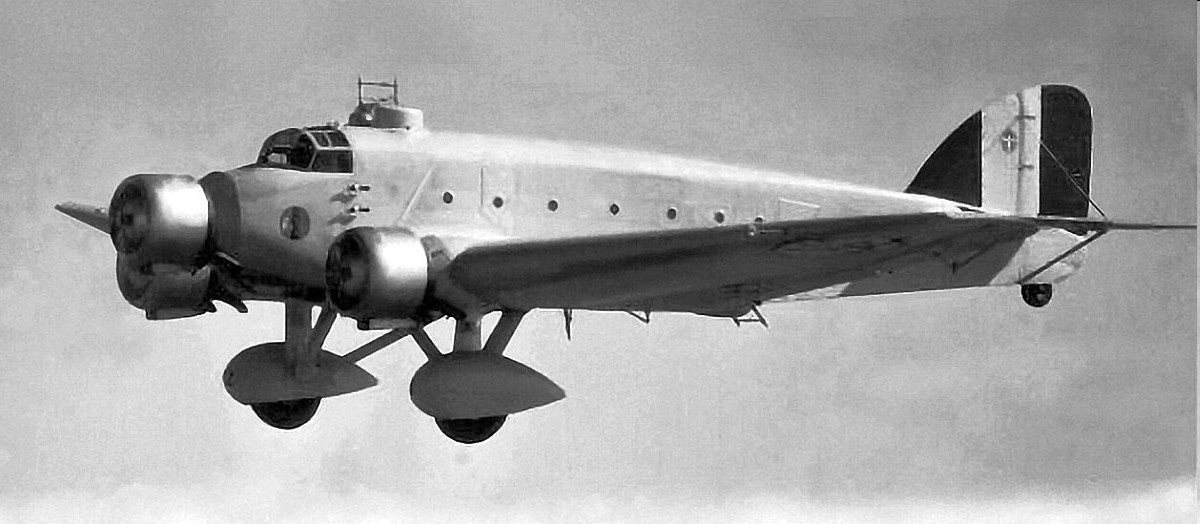
Savoia-Marchetti SM.81

Savoia-Marchetti started work on the SM.79 in 1934. The design team was headed by aeronautical engineer Alessandro Marchetti. It was to be a fast transport aircraft, capable of accommodating eight passengers and of being entered in air races (such as the MacRobertson Air Race). The design, which was initially designated SM.79P (P was for passenger), was to be a civil derivative of the Savoia-Marchetti SM.81, a militarised transport/bomber aircraft based upon the Savoia-Marchetti S.73 airliner.

The company quickly built a single prototype, hoping to enter in the high-profile MacRobertson race. The SM.79 is a trimotor with two engines on the wings and the third on the nose due to commercial safety concerns rather than speed. Originally, there were plans to use the 597 kW (801 hp) Isotta-Fraschini Asso XI Ri, however, it was decided to use the less powerful 440 kW (590 hp) Piaggio Stella P.IX R.C.40, a derivative of the license-produced version of the British Bristol Jupiter, on which many of Piaggio's engines were based.

The prototype made its first flight on 28 September 1934. Despite the company's hopes, the prototype (registered I-MAGO) was not ready for it to compete in the London-Melbourne race. The prototype soon showed off its speed, making a flight from Milan to Rome in just one hour and 10 minutes, an average speed of 410 km/h (250 mph). On 20 July 1935 it was given its Certificate of Airworthiness. Soon after, on 2 August 1935, the prototype established a new speed record by flying from Rome to Massaua, in Italian Eritrea, in 12 flying hours (with a refuelling stop at Cairo, Egypt).

Various other world records were established by the prototype. The prototype was re-engined multiple times as more power was needed. During 1935, the original P.IX engines were replaced by 485 kW (650 hp) Alfa Romeo 125 RC.35s, a license-produced version of the Bristol Pegasus. During 1936 these were replaced by 582 kW (780 hp) Alfa Romeo 126 RC.34s. The performance demonstrated by the prototype attracted Italian military attention, which requested a bomber version.

An evaluation of the SM.79 for military use concluded that the installation of either two or three defensive machine guns would be needed for defense against fighters. In response to the military interest, the company decided to construct a second militarised prototype. While it did not differ in structure from the first civil prototype, it had a faired ventral nacelle for a bomb-aimer, a forward-firing machine gun above the pilot's cabin, and another machine gun under the tail. A third machine gun could be installed at the rear of the dorsal fairing .

During October 1936, production started. Initially, priority was given to civil aircraft while development of the military variant proceeded. As such, there were a pair of principal commercial variants produced, these being the SM.79C (C standing for race) and the long-range SM.79T (T for Transatlantic). These variants participated in record-setting attempts during 1937 and 1938. In light of opinions amongst prospective export customers regarding the desirability of a nose-mounted gun position (impossible due to the nose-mounted third engine), Savoia-Marchetti started work on a twin-engined model, as the SM.79B. This had a redesigned nose section which incorporated the bomb-aimer's position and an elevated position for the pilot, along with a single movable machine gun, and was first flown in 1936.

In addition to those manufactured by Savoia-Marchetti, in order to meet demand Aeronautica Umbra, based in Foligno, also produced the type. Manufacture continued until June 1943, during which time a total of 1,217 aircraft were completed, many of which were completed to bomber, torpedo-bomber, and transport configurations. The SM.79 has been described as being by far the most important Italian offensive warplane of the Second World War, and one of the very few Italian aircraft to be produced in substantial quantities.

== Design ==
=== Overview ===
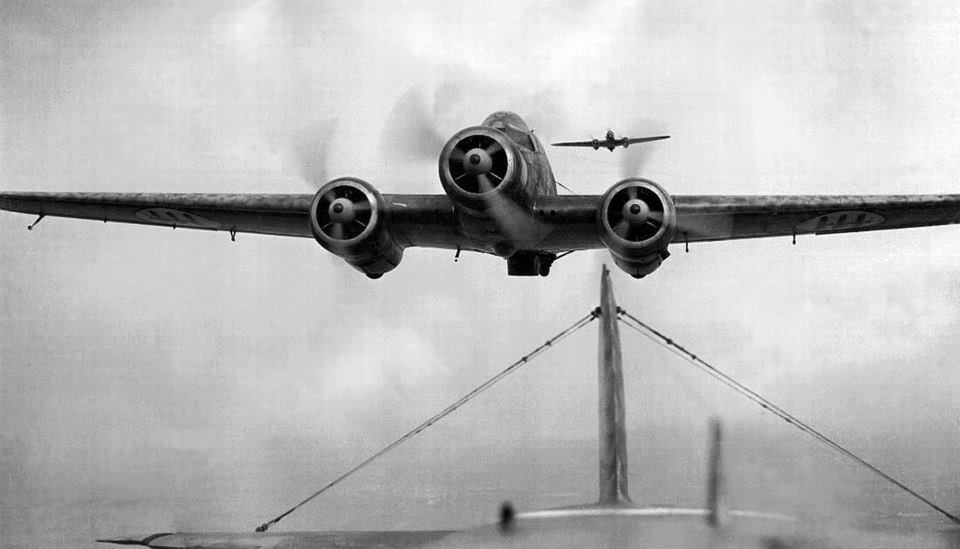
A head-on view of a SM.79

The SM.79 was a cantilever low-wing monoplane trimotor, with a retractable taildragger undercarriage. The fuselage had a welded tubular steel framework covered with duralumin on the forward section, a mixture of duralumin and plywood across the upper fuselage surface, and fabric for all of the other exterior surfaces. The wings were of all-wood construction, with trailing edge flaps and leading edge slats (Handley Page style) to offset their relatively small size. The structure consisted of three spruce and plywood spars, linked with plywood ribs, with a skin of plywood. The wing had a dihedral of 2° 15'. The ailerons were capable of rotating through +13/-26°, and were used together with the flaps in low-speed flight and in takeoff. The aircraft's capabilities were significantly greater than its predecessor, the SM.75, with over 1,715 kW (2,300 hp) available and a high wing loading that gave it characteristics not dissimilar to a large fighter.

The engines fitted to the main bomber version were three 582 kW (780 hp) Alfa Romeo 126 RC.34 radials, driving variable-pitch, all-metal three-bladed propellers. Speeds attained were around 430 km/h (270 mph) at 4,250 m (13,940 ft), with a relatively low practical ceiling of 6,500 m (21,300 ft). Cruise speed was 373 km/h (232 mph) at 5,000 m (16,000 ft), but the best cruise speed was 259 km/h (161 mph) (60% power). The landing was characterized by a 200 km/h (120 mph) final approach with the slats extended, slowing to 145 km/h (90 mph) with extension of flaps, and finally the run over the field with only 200 m (660 ft) needed to land (2,050 rpm, 644 Hg pressure).

The SM.79 was typically operated by a crew of five (or a crew of six upon the bomber version). The cockpit was designed for the accommodation of two pilots seated in a side-by-side configuration. Instrumentation in the central panel included oil and fuel gauges, altimeters for low (1,000 m (3,300 ft)) and high altitude (8,000 metres (26,000 ft)), clock, airspeed and vertical speed indicator, gyroscope, compass, artificial horizon, turn and bank indicator, rev counters and throttles.

=== Performance ===
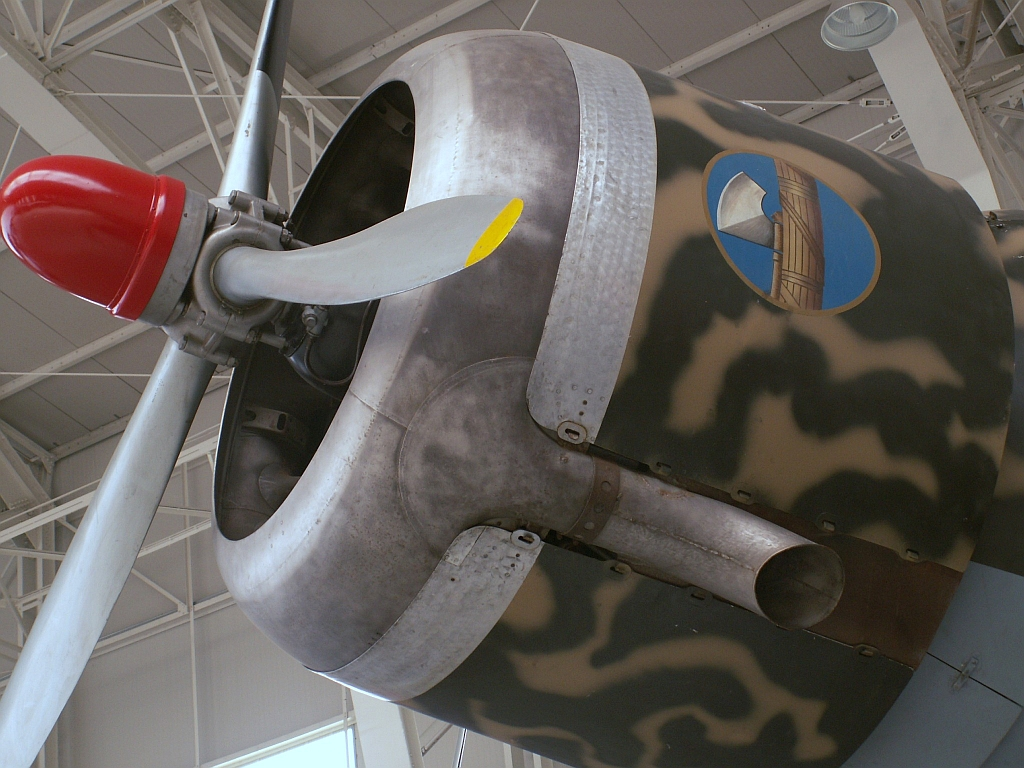
Close-up view of the SM.79's nose-mounted center engine

The SM.79's performance was considered fairly strong. Its rate of climb was fairly high, it was fairly fast for its time, and was both rugged and responsive enough to allow it to be looped (with care). Its wooden structure was light enough to allow it to stay afloat for up to half an hour in case of water landing, giving the crew ample time to escape, and the front engine offered some protection from anti aircraft fire. With full power available and flaps set for takeoff, the SM.79 could be airborne within 300 m (980 ft) before quickly climbing to an altitude of 1,000 m (3,300 ft) within the space of 3 minutes, 2,000 m (6,600 ft) in 6 minutes 30 seconds, 3,000 m (9,800 ft) in 9 minutes 34 seconds, 4,000 m (13,000 ft) in 13 minutes 2 seconds, and 5,000 m (16,000 ft) in 17 minutes 43 seconds.

The bomber version had 10 separate fuel tanks that had a maximum combined capacity of 3,460 L (910 US gal). Endurance when flown at full load was reportedly around 4 hours 30 minutes at an average speed of 360 km/h (220 mph). The maximum ferry range, when flown at its optimal cruise speed, was unconfirmed; in order to reach Addis Ababa with non-stop flights from Libya, SM.79s were frequently modified in order to carry more fuel, and were able to fly over 2,000 km (1,200 mi). The range with 1,000 kg (2,200 lb) payload was around 800–900 km (500–560 mi).

The effective torpedo bombing range was stated to be between 500 and 1,000 m (1,600 and 3,300 ft) from the target. During combat operations, SM.79s would often fly at low level above hostile vessels prior to launching the aerial torpedo; as such, they were frequently targeted by every weapon available, from infantry small arms to heavy artillery, in a last ditch effort to prevent the torpedoes from being deployed. The Sparviero had several advantages compared to British torpedo bombers, including a higher top speed and greater range. Soon however, the Sparviero faced the Hawker Hurricane and the naval Fairey Fulmar, which was faster but still quite slow in relation to other escort fighters. Bristol Beaufighters were fast and well-armed, and as well as being effective long-range day fighters, were successful night interceptors and late in the war often chased Sparvieros in night missions. Curtiss P-40s, Lockheed P-38 Lightnings, Grumman Martlets and Supermarine Spitfires serving in the Mediterranean hindered Sparviero operations during the day.

=== Armament ===
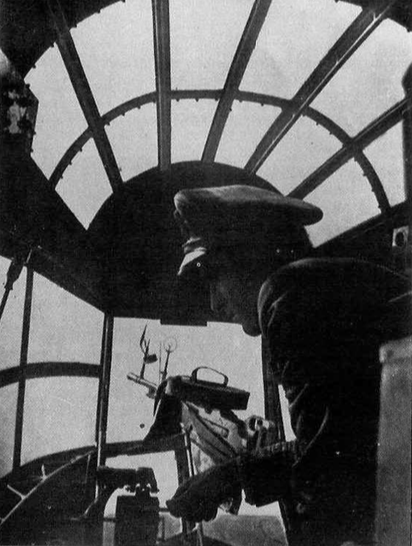
Internal view from nose gun of twin engine version

The defensive armament of the SM.79 initially consisted of four, later increased to five, Breda-SAFAT machine guns. Three of these were 12.7 mm (0.5 in) guns, two of which were positioned in the dorsal "hump", with the forward one (with 300 rounds) fixed at an elevation of 15°, and the other manoeuvrable with 60° pivotal movement in the horizontal, and 0–70° in the vertical plane. The third 12.7 mm (0.5 in) machine gun was located ventrally. Each gun except for the forward one was equipped with 500 rounds. There was also a 7.7 mm (0.303 in) Lewis Gun in one of a pair of "waist" mounts, on a mount that allowed rapid change of side of the weapon. This Lewis gun was later replaced by two 7.7 mm (0.303 in) Bredas in the waist mounts, which were more reliable and faster firing (900 rounds/min instead of 500), even though there was only sufficient room in the fuselage for one man to operate them. Despite the low overall "hitting power", it was heavily armed by 1930s standards, the armament being more than a match for the fighter aircraft of the time, which were not usually fitted with any armour. By the Second World War, however, the Sparviero's vulnerability to newer fighters was significant, and it lost the reputation for near-invulnerability that it had gained over Spain.

No turrets were ever installed upon any SM.79s, which imposed considerable limitations upon its fields of defensive fire. Of all its defensive weapons, the dorsal one was often considered to be the most important as, following the shift to low-level attacks, the Sparviero was attacked almost exclusively from the rear and above. The defensive weapons located in the rear gondola and the rear hump were protected by aerodynamic shields, which were intended to only be opened in the event of attackers appearing. However, in practice, an enemy aircraft could attack the Sparviero while remaining unseen, so the defensive positions were usually left open even though this had the effect of reducing the aircraft's maximum effective speed.

The cramped layout of the ventral gondola, with the bomb-aiming instruments located in front and the rearwards-aimed ventral defensive machine gun in the rear, made it impossible to perform both bomb-aiming and rear defence simultaneously, so its usefulness was compromised. Because of this, in the later versions which were used exclusively for torpedo-bombing tasks, the ventral weapon and nacelle were removed. The fixed forward Breda machine gun, more suited to offensive tasks and aimed by the pilot, was seldom used defensively, and was often removed or replaced with a smaller calibre gun or mock-up, with an associated gain in speed and range due to the reduction in weight. The rear ventral gondola on the Sparviero was somewhat similar to the almost identically located Bola emplacement on the main wartime production -P and -H subtypes of the Heinkel He 111 German heavy bomber, which was only used as a ventral defensive armament mount on the German aircraft.

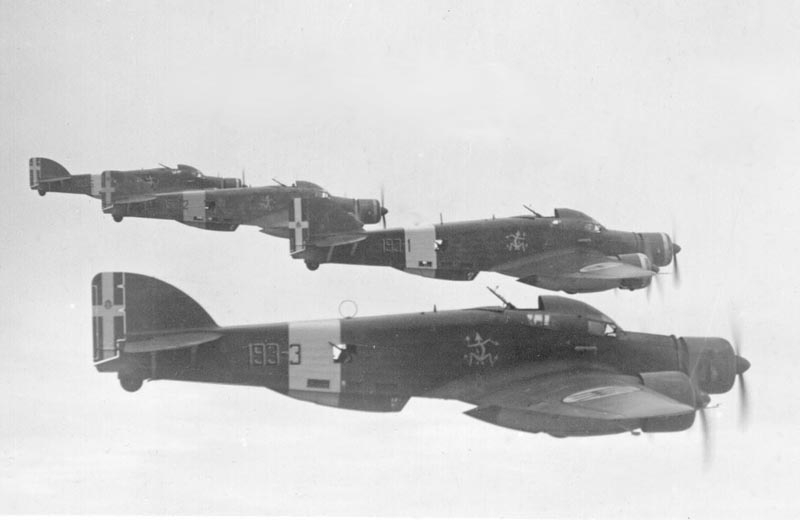
A flight of four SM.79s showing their rear-cockpit mounted machine guns

As with the Luftwaffe's He 111, the Sparviero's bomb bay was configured to carry bombs vertically; this design decision had the consequence of preventing large bombs from being accommodated internally. The aircraft could accommodate a pair of 500 kg (1,100 lb), five 250 kg (550 lb), 12 100 or 50 kg (220 or 110 lb) bombs, or hundreds of bomblets. The bombardier, who had an 85° forward field of view from his position, was normally provided with a "Jozza-2" aiming system, automatic cameras and a series of bomb-release mechanisms. The machine gun to the rear of the gondola prevented the bombardier from lying in a prone position, and as a result, the bombardier was provided with retractable structures to support his legs while seated.

From 1939 onward, two torpedoes could be carried externally, as could larger bombs, on two hardpoints fitted under the inner wing. However, in practice, owing to the reduced performance and manoeuvrability of the aircraft when carrying two torpedoes, usually only one was carried. The SM.79's overall payload of 3,800 kg (8,400 lb) precluded carrying 1,600–1,860 kg (3,530–4,100 lb) of bombs without a noticeable reduction of the fuel load (approximately 2,400 kg (5,300 lb), when full). The standard torpedo, a 1938 Whitehead design, had a weight of 876 kg (1,931 lb), length of 5.46 m (17 ft 11 in) and a 170 kg (370 lb) HE warhead. It had a 3 km (1.9 mi) range at 74 km/h (46 mph) and could be launched from a wide range of speeds and altitudes: 40–120 m (130–390 ft) and up to 300 km/h (190 mph) maximum. It took over ten years to develop effective torpedo-bombing techniques; consequently, with the failure of the SM.84 (its intended successor) and the lack of power of the Ca.314, only the SM.79 continued to serve as a torpedo bomber until 1944, despite trials conducted with many other types of aircraft, including the Fiat G.55S fighter.

== Operational history ==
=== Record-setting aircraft ===
Although Italy did not win the prestigious Schneider Trophy, state support for aeronautical feats was maintained as one element of Italian Prime Minister Benito Mussolini's long term propaganda campaign to promote and win prestige for fascist Italy and his government. Following a pair of initial successes, further Sparvieros received specialised modifications for the purpose of establishing new speed records. The SM.79 prototype I-MAGO was modified to carry a payload of 6,100 kg (13,400 lb) of bombs internally, which enabled it to attempt speed records while carrying a payload. On 23 September 1935, it flew for 2,000 km (1,200 mi) with a 2,000 kg (4,400 lb) load at an average speed of 389.61 km/h (242.09 mph), breaking six world records in the process.

As on the prototype, the "hump" was not fitted to the first production aircraft, these being high performance aircraft, designated SM.79CS. One of these established further records during 1937; powered by three Piaggio P.XI RC.40 engines (providing a combined power of 2,237 kW (3,000 hp)), it averaged 423.618 km/h (263.224 mph) over 1,000 km (620 mi) with a 2,000 kg (4,400 lb) payload. This record was then improved to 444.115 km/h (275.960 mph), while another SM.79 achieved 428.296 km/h (266.131 mph) in the 2,000 km (1,200 mi)/ 2,000 kg (4,400 lb) category. Unofficially, a speed of 472 km/h (293 mph) was later achieved.

A group of five SM.79CSs went on to enter the Paris-Damascus–Istres race. I-CUPA, I-FILU and I-BIMU took the first three positions, while the other two were placed sixth and seventh, the latter of which was heavily damaged in Damascus. A pair of Fiat BR.20s had also competed in the same race, but were only able to achieve a joint sixth place (with a SM.79) and an eighth place. Three of the SM.79CSs were modified to increase their endurance, allowing them to traverse the Atlantic Ocean and reach Brazil. On 24 January 1938, the three aircraft took off; 11 hours later, they landed in Dakar, Senegal, where they refuelled before heading for Rio de Janeiro, Brazil; on 25 January, two of the three arrived at 22:45 local time. However, one of the aircraft suffered a technical fault, forcing the crew to land at Natal, Northeastern Brazil; this SM.79 remained there for some time, and was eventually donated to the Brazilian Air Force.

=== Regia Aeronautica ===
==== Introduction ====
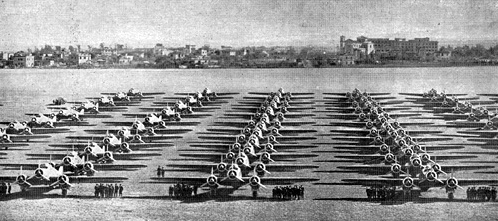
Lines of parked SM.79s

The 12° Stormo (Wing) was the first to be equipped with the SM.79, starting in early 1936, and was involved in the initial evaluation of the bomber, which continued throughout 1936. The Wing went operational on 1 May 1936 with the SM.79 successfully completing torpedo launches from a target distance of 5 km (3.1 mi) in August 1936. The torpedo bomber variant was much more unstable and harder to control than the civilian version (and much less precise than its successor, the SM.81). Its capabilities were still being explored when the Spanish Civil War broke out, and a number of SM.79s were dispatched to support the Nationalists.

Following its service in the Spanish Civil War, the Sparviero came into use with 111° and 8° Wing. By the end of 1939, there were 388 Sparvieros in Italian service, spread across 11 wings that were either partially or totally equipped with this aircraft. The type also participated in the Italian occupation of Albania during autumn 1939. By the beginning of the Second World War, a total of 612 aircraft had been delivered, making the Sparviero the most numerous bomber in the whole of the Regia Aereonautica, assigned to a total of 14 wings (8, 9, 10, 11, 12, 14, 15, 30, 32, 33, 34, 36, 41 and 46). Not all of these wings had Gruppi (groups) entirely equipped with the SM.79. Every squadron had around nine to 10 aircraft, but this included second line aircraft, so the force of each squadron consisted on average of around seven to eight bombers, and every wing had around 30 bombers. Among these units; 8, 9, 11, 12, 30, 32, 36, 41 and 46 Stormi (Wings) were based in Italy, and participated in the Battle of France. They were equipped with a total of around 350 SM.79s, including those used in training squadrons.

==== Spanish Civil War ====
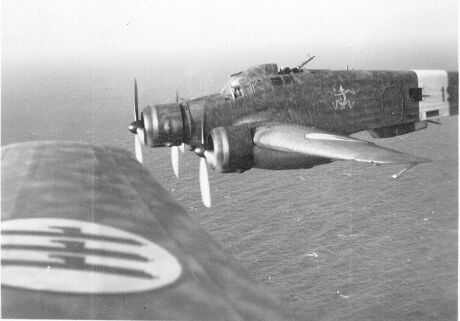
SM.79 in flight

The SM.79 saw action for the first time when serving with the Aviazione Legionaria, an Italian unit sent to assist Franco's Nationalist forces during the Spanish Civil War. The Sparviero started its operational service at the end of 1936 when 8° Stormo B.T. (Bombardamento Tattico), with Gruppi XXVII° and XXVIII°, under the command of Tenente Colonnello Riccardo Seidl, was sent to Spain. Deployed to the Balearic Islands, the unit was named "Falchi delle Baleari" (Balearic Falcons) and operated over Catalonia and the main cities of eastern Spain, attacking the Second Spanish Republic. During the three years of the civil conflict, in excess of 100 SM.79s served as bombers for the Aviazione Legionaria, of these, only four were recorded as being lost in combat. Due to the experience gained in Spain the SM.79-II, introduced during October 1939, went on to form the backbone of the Italian bomber corps during the Second World War.

By 4 November 1936, there were only six SM.79s with enough crew to fly them operating in Spain. At the beginning of 1937, there were 15 SM.79s in total, and they went on to be used in Spain throughout the conflict, experiencing few losses throughout. Around 19 SM.79s of what was dispatched to the Spanish theatre were lost, while deliveries to 12 Wing and other units involved in combat numbered at least 100 aircraft. The first recorded interception of an SM.79 formation took place on 11 October 1937 when three aircraft were attacked by a formation of 12 Polikarpov I-16s. One of the SM.79s was damaged, but its defensive armament prevented the fighters from performing close-up attacks. All of the bombers successfully returned to base, although one had been hit by 27 bullets, many of which having struck fuel tanks. Several other interceptions occurred during the conflict without any SM.79s being lost as a result.

On 26 April 1937, three SM.79 took part in the bombing of Basque town of Guernica, carried out with the Nazi German Luftwaffe's Condor Legion, at the behest of Francisco Franco's rebel Nationalist faction. The bombing, under the code name 'Operation Rügen', opened the way to Franco's capture of Bilbao and his victory in northern Spain. Combat experience gained during the war had revealed some deficiencies present in the SM.79: the lack of oxygen masks for high altitude operation, relatively high levels of instability, vibrations experienced at speeds over 400 km/h (250 mph) and other problems were encountered and sometimes solved. General Valle, in an attempt to answer some of the criticisms about the ability of the aircraft to operate at night, took off from Guidonia and bombed Barcelona, a journey of six hours and 15 minutes. On this occasion, the aircraft proved it had a useful range (around 1,000 km (620 mi) with eight 100 kg (220 lb) bombs, for a total gross weight of around 1,000 kg (2,200 lb). SM.79s initially operated from the Balearic Islands and later from mainland Spain. Hundreds of missions were performed in a wide range of roles against Republican targets. No Fiat CR.32s were required to escort the SM.79s, partly because the biplane fighters were too slow to keep up with the type.

==== Malta ====
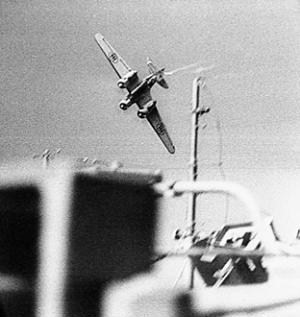
SM.79 attacking a convoy heading for Malta.

The SM.79 began to lose its reputation for invulnerability when RAF Gloster Gladiators and Hawker Hurricanes were encountered over the fortress-island Malta, at the centre of the Mediterranean, in June 1940. The first of many Sparvieros shot down over Malta fell on 22 June. That day, Sparviero M.M.22068 of 216^{a} Squadriglia, piloted by Tenente Francesco Solimene, took off at 18.15 to reconnoitre bombing targets on the island. Two Gladiators were scrambled, one piloted by Flt Lt George Burges. Over Sliema and Valletta Burges attacked the Sparviero from superior height, shooting off the port engine. The SM.79 caught fire and crashed in the sea off Kalafrana. The pilot, Solimene, and1° Aviere Armiere Torrisi were rescued from the sea, but the other four crew members were lost.

A Sparviero had the dubious honour of being the first aircraft to fall on Maltese soil during the Second World War: on 10 July 1940, an estimated twenty SM.79s without escort arrived to bomb the dockyard, Manoel Island, Tarxien and Żabbar. They were attacked by Gladiator fighters; during the engagement, one bomber, piloted by Sottotenente Felice Filippi from 195^{a} Squadriglia, 90° Gruppo, 30° Stormo Bombardamento Terrestre, came down in flames just behind the Knight's watchtower east of Fort San Leonardo. The air victory was credited to Flying Officer Frederick Taylor. At least one Italian bailed out, but his parachute was on fire and he was killed.

==== Other theaters ====
A small number of SM.79s saw service in Ethiopia; according to Apostolo, it was the most advanced aircraft to be deployed to the theatre by either side. On the western side of Italian East Africa, at Diredawa, 6a and 7a Squadriglie of 44° Gruppo operated twelve SM.79s each. Italy also had six SM.79s as part of the reserve forces but two of them were under repair. The Sparviero was the only type present that had not participated in the Second Italo-Abyssinian War. The SM.79s of Italian East Africa first saw action on 13 June 1940, when nine of them took off from Diredawa to attack Aden. The SM.79 flown by Sottotenente Ruffini was hit by anti-aircraft fire from a British warship and crashed. Two Gloster Gladiators then intercepted the remaining bombers; Pilot Officer Stephenson's Gladiator attacked the Sparviero of Capitano Serafini, which had been damaged by anti-aircraft fire, but the Gladiator was hit by the SM.79's dorsal gunner, forcing it to crash-land. Serafini managed to land at Assab, but his aircraft was a write-off; another Savoia Marchetti was damaged, but landed at the same base. These few aircraft were later reinforced by others which were modified to fly at an economical speed over Sudan for the hazardous ferry flight of over 2,000 km (1,200 mi). They could not, however, do much to help Italian forces in Ethiopia, which were forced to surrender in spring 1941. The same period saw the five Iraqi SM.79Bs and the 45 SM.79Ks in Yugoslavian service unable to mount a successful defence in either Iraq or Yugoslavia.

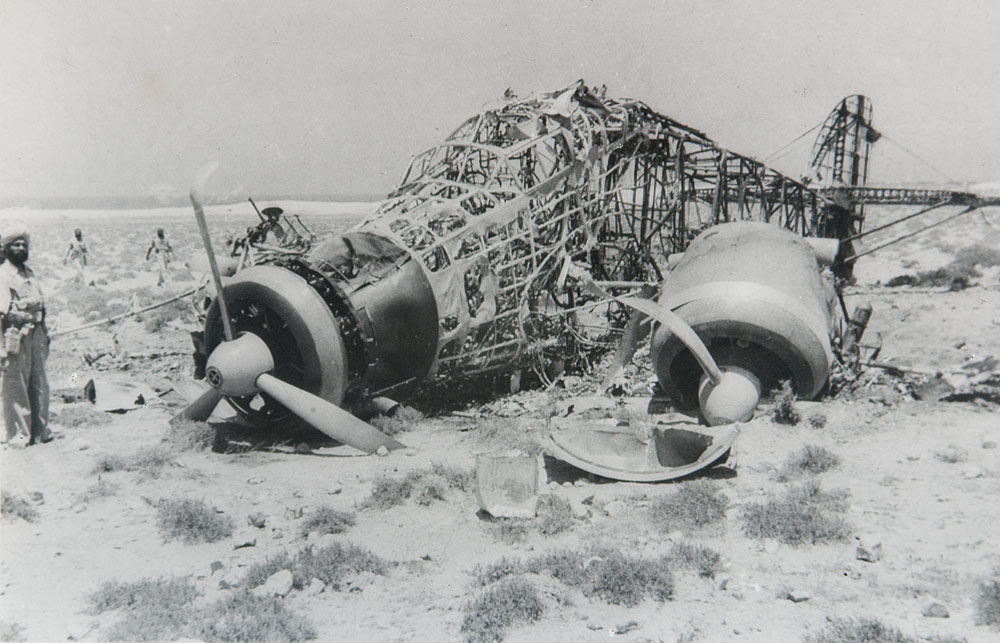
A wrecked SM.79 in North Africa

During the North African campaign, around 100 SM.79s served in 10, 14, 15 and 30 Wings, bombing mainly non-strategic targets in the desert. The British offensive in December hit the Regia Aeronautica hard and many wings (a total of nine by May 1941) were phased out because of losses caused by enemy aircraft and ground fire. One aircraft was destroyed on the ground by R patrol of the Long Range Desert Group at the western landing ground at Jebel Uweinat in November 1940 (the remains were still there in 2003). At the beginning of 1941 only around 40 SM.79s were still present in Libya, and by the end of 1941 only one operational squadron remained. In the Second Battle of El Alamein, many Sparvieros were used for defensive tasks, such as countering SAS teams in the desert, and in anti-ship roles.

From autumn 1940, SM.79s were used against the Kingdom of Greece, then Yugoslavia. They continued to be hampered in their operations by the Royal Air Force, but also by poor weather conditions. Over the Mediterranean, the Sparvieros were used in reconnaissance missions and anti-ship attacks.

==== Use as a torpedo bomber ====
===== 1940 =====
On 25 July 1940, the Sparviero formally commenced service as a torpedo bomber (Aerosilurante in Italian) as a new operational unit, the "Special Aerotorpedoes Unit" (headed by Colonel Moioli), was established following several years of experiments involving the type. After having ordered the first 50 torpedoes from Whitehead Torpedo Works, on 10 August 1940, the first aircraft landed at T5 airfield, near Tobruk. Despite the lack of an aiming system and a specific doctrine for tactics, an attack on shipping in Alexandria was quickly organized. There had been experiments for many years but still, no service, no gear (except hardpoints) and no tactics were developed for the new role. This was despite previous Italian experiments into the practice of aerial torpedoing in 1914, 26 years earlier.

On 15 August 1940, the type's first combat sortie saw five SM.79s that had been modified and prepared for the task dispatched to El Adem airfield. Among their pilots were Buscaglia, Dequal and other pilots destined to become "aces." The journey was made at an altitude of 1,500 m (4,900 ft) and after two hours, at 21:30, they arrived over Alexandria and began attacking ships, but unsuccessfully. The departure airport had only 1,000 m (3,300 ft) of runway for takeoff, so two of the fuel tanks were left empty to reduce weight, giving an endurance of five hours for a 4.33-hour journey. Only Buscaglia and Dequal returned, both aircraft damaged by anti-aircraft fire. Buscaglia landed on only one wheel, with some other damage. The other three SM.79s, attacking after the first two, were hindered by a fierce anti-aircraft defence and low clouds and returned to their base without releasing their torpedoes. However, all three ran out of fuel and were forced to jettison the torpedoes which exploded in the desert, and then force-landed three hours after the attack. Two crews were rescued later, but the third (Fusco's) was still in Egypt when they force-landed. The crew set light to their aircraft the next morning, which alerted the British who then captured them. These failures were experienced within a combat radius of only about 650 km (400 mi), in clear contrast with the glamorous performances of the racer Sparvieros just a few years before.

Many missions followed, on 22–23 August (Alexandria), 26 August (against ships never found), and 27 August (Buscaglia against a cruiser). The special unit became known as the 278^{a} Squadriglia, and from September 1940 carried out many shipping attacks, including on 4 September (when Buscaglia had his aircraft damaged by fighters) and 10 September, when Robone claimed a merchant ship sunk. On 17 September, after an unsuccessful day attack, Buscaglia and Robone returned at night, attacking the British ships that shelled Bardia. One torpedo hit HMS Kent, damaging the heavy cruiser to the extent that the ship remained under repair until September 1941. After almost a month of attacks, this was the first success officially acknowledged and proven. After almost a month of further attacks, a newcomer, Erasi, flew with Robone on 14 October 1940 against a British formation and hit HMS Liverpool, a modern cruiser that lost her bow and needed 13 months of repair. After several months, and despite the losses and the first unfortunate mission, the core of the 278^{a} was still operating the same four aircraft. The last success of this squadron was at Souda Bay, Crete, when Buscaglia damaged another cruiser, HMS Glasgow, despite the anti-torpedo netting surrounding the ship, sending it out of commission for nine months while repairs were made. The aircraft continued in service until a British bomb struck them, setting off a torpedo and a "chain reaction" which destroyed them all.

===== 1941 =====
The year was one of intense activity for the Italian torpedo bombers. In April many successes were recorded by SM.79s of the 281^{a} and 280^{a} Squadriglie. They sank two merchant ships, heavily damaged the British cruiser HMS Manchester (rendering her out of service for nine months for repair and refit) and later also sank the F-class destroyer HMS Fearless. However, one SM.79 was shot down 25 nmi (46 km; 29 mi) north west of Gozo on 3 June, landing in the sea and staying afloat for some time. Further Italian successes came in August, when the light cruiser HMS Phoebe was damaged. The large merchant ship SS Imperial Star (12,427 GRT)) was damaged by an SM.79 on 27 September during Operation Halberd which resupplied Malta; unable to tow it to Malta it was scuttled by HMS Oribi. In the same Operation the battleship HMS Nelson was torpedoed and damaged by a SM.79 which in turn was shot down. The 130° and 132° Gruppi were also active during the autumn. On 24 October, they sank the merchant vessels Empire Pelican and Empire Defender, on 23 November they sank the merchant vessels Glenearn and Xhakdina, and on 11 December they heavily damaged Jackal.

The year ended with a total of nine Allied ships sunk and 30 damaged; for 14 torpedo bombers lost and another 46 damaged in action. This was the best year for the Italian torpedo bombers and also the year when the SM.84, the SM.79's successor was introduced. Overall, these numbers meant little in the war, and almost no other results were recorded by Italian bombers. Horizontal bombing proved to be a failure and only dive bombers and torpedo-bombers achieved some results. Most of the major British ships lost were due to U-boat attacks, with the damaging of HMS Warspite, and the sinking of HMS Barham and HMS Ark Royal, whereas the most significant success of Italian torpedo bombers were the damaging of HMS Nelson and of some cruisers. After the Raid on Alexandria by Italian frogmen of Decima MAS, the British fleet was left without major ships in their Mediterranean fleet, leaving the Axis better situated to control the sea.

===== 1942 =====
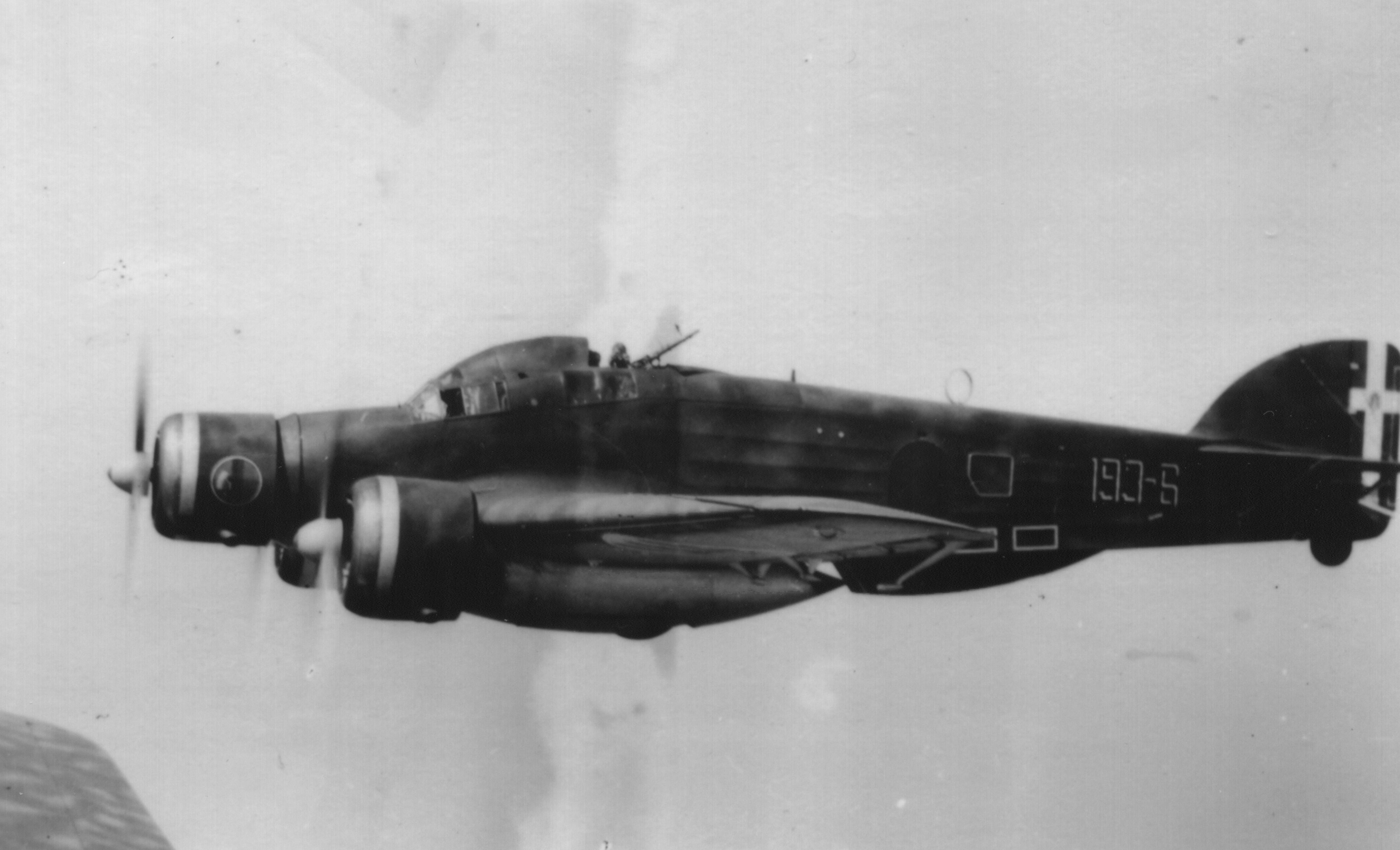
A S.M.79 of the 193ª Squadriglia Bombardamento Terrestre (193rd Land Bombing Squadron), 87º Gruppo (87th Group), 30º Stormo (87th Wing)

The Axis' fortunes started to decline steadily during 1942. Over 100 SM.79s were in service in different Italian torpedo squadrons. In addition to its wide-scale deployment in its intended bomber-torpedo bomber role, the Sparviero was also used for close support, reconnaissance and transport missions. In the first six months of 1942, all the Italo-German efforts to hit Allied ships had only resulted in the sinking of the merchant ship Thermopilae by an aircraft flown by Carlo Faggioni.

The Allies aimed to provide Malta with vital supplies and fuel through major convoy operations at all costs. Almost all Axis air potential was used against the first big Allied convoy of 1942, code-named Operation Harpoon. 14 June saw the second torpedoing of Liverpool, by a 132º Gruppo SM.79, putting it out of action for another 13 months. Regardless of where the torpedo struck (amidships in the case of Liverpool, aft as for Kent, or forward as happened to Glasgow), the cruisers remained highly vulnerable to torpedoes, but no Italian air attack managed to hit them with more than one torpedo at once. On the same day the merchant ship Tanimbar was sunk by SM.79s of the 132nd, and finally the day after HMS Bedouin, a Tribal-class destroyer, already damaged by two Italian cruisers, was sunk by pilot M. Aichner, also of 132nd Gruppo. For years this victory was contested by the Italian Navy, who claimed to have sunk Bedouin with gunfire.

August saw heavy attacks on the 14 merchant ships and 44 major warships of the Operation Pedestal convoy, the second Allied attempt to resupply Malta past Axis bombers, minefields and U-boats. Nine of the merchant ships and four of the warships were sunk, and others were damaged, but only the destroyer HMS Foresight and the merchant ship MV Deucalion were sunk by Italian torpedo bombers. Although damaged, the tanker SS Ohio, a key part of the convoy, was towed into Grand Harbour to deliver the vital fuel on 15 August 1942 to enable Malta to continue functioning as an important Allied base, a major Allied strategic success.

By winter 1942, in contrast to Operation Torch, 9 December was a successful day when four SM.79s sank a Flower-class corvette and a merchant ship, with the loss of one aircraft. Carlo Emanuele Buscaglia, another prominent member of the Italian torpedo-airforce who was credited with over 90,718 tonnes (100,000 tons) of enemy shipping sunk, was shot down the day after saying "We will probably all be dead before Christmas". The risks of attempting to overcome the effective defences of allied ships were too great to expect much chance of long-term survival, but he was later rescued from the water, badly wounded. On 18 November, the light cruiser HMS Arethusa was torpedoed and badly damaged during Operation Stone Age.

Despite the increased activity in 1942, the results were considerably poorer than those of the previous year; the efforts made by the bombers were subject to strong criticism and widely deemed to have been insufficient. Many debated the possibilities of torpedo manufacturing defects or even sabotage: the first 30 used in 1940 had excellent reliability, but a number of later torpedoes were found to be defective, especially those made at the Naples factory. During Operation Harpoon, over 100 torpedoes were launched, but only three of these had hit their targets.

===== 1943 =====
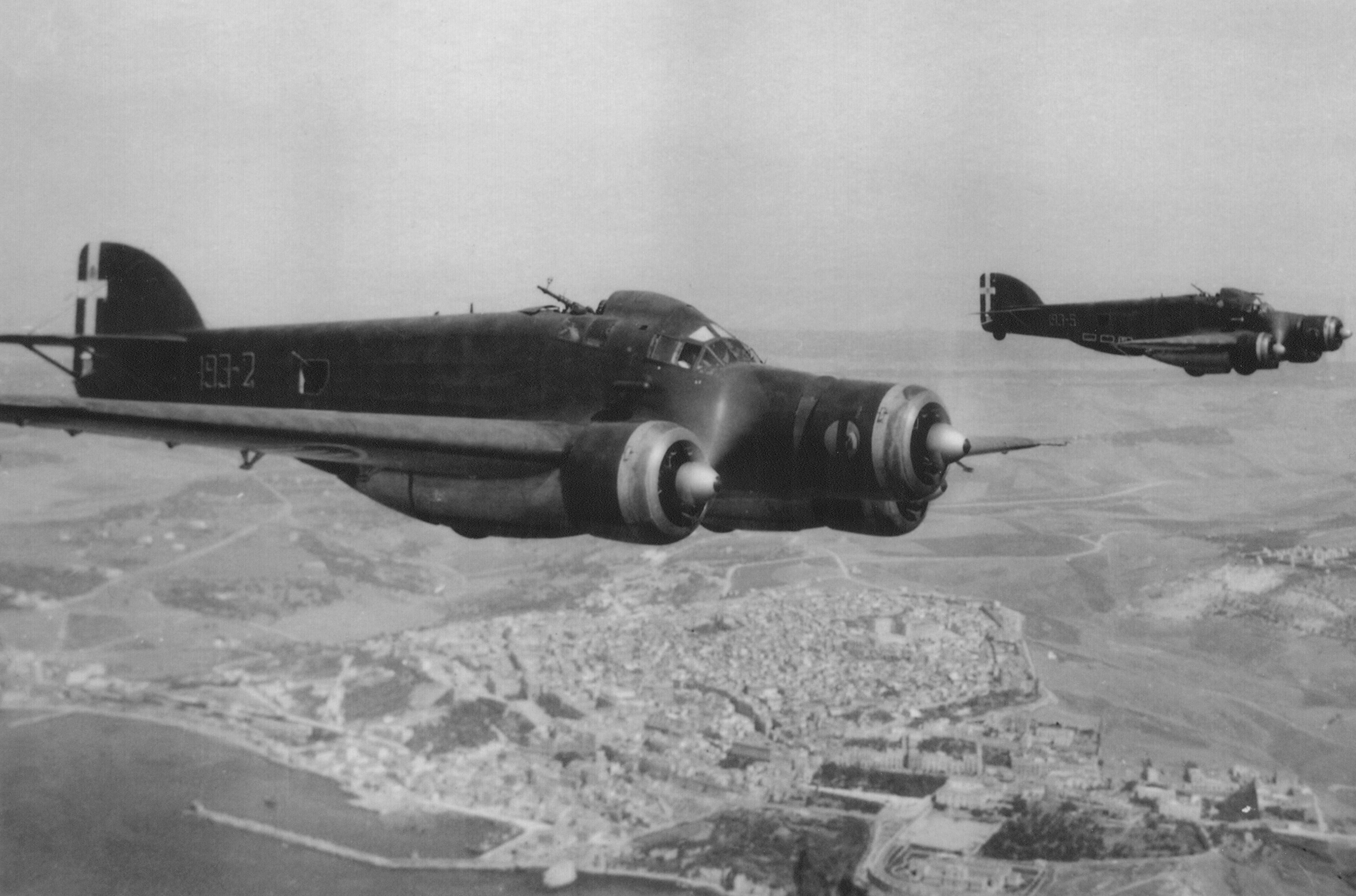
A pair of S.M.79s in flight over Sciacca, Sicily

Prior to 1943, the survival chances of the Aerosiluranti had diminished steadily: on average, a SM.79 would be shot down after just three missions. The year opened with attacks against Allied shipping off North Africa, during which they were unable to accomplish many successes. During July, the Allies invaded Sicily with an immense fleet. The Sparvieri were already obsolete and phased out of service in bomber Wings and its intended successors, the SM.84 and Z.1007, were considered to be failures, while the latter were not produced in enough numbers. As a consequence, the latest version of the Sparviero was retained for performing torpedo attacks, being considerably faster than its predecessors.

Before the invasion, there was a large force of torpedo aircraft: 7 Gruppi (groups), 41, 89, 104, 108, 130, 131 and 132nd equipped with dozens of aircraft, but this was nevertheless a weak force. Except for the 104th, based around the Aegean Sea, the other six Gruppi comprised just 61 aircraft, with only 22 serviceable. Almost all the available machines were sent to the Raggruppamento Aerosiluranti, but of the 44 aircraft, only a third were considered flight-worthy by 9 July 1943. Production of new SM.79s continued to fall behind and up to the end of July only 37 SM.79s and 39 SM.84s were delivered. Despite the use of an improved engine, capable of a maximum speed of 475 km/h (295 mph), these machines were unable to cope with the difficult task of resisting the invasion. They were too large to allow them to evade detection by enemy defences, and their large aircrew requirement resulted in heavy losses of personnel. In the first five days SM.79s performed 57 missions, at night only, and failed to achieve any results, with the loss of seven aircraft. Another three aircraft were lost on 16 July 1943 in a co-ordinated attack with German forces on HMS Indomitable, which was hit and put out of combat for many months.

SM.79s were not equipped with radar, so the attacks had to be performed visually, hopefully aided by moonlight, while the Allies had ship-borne radar and interceptor aircraft. Despite their depleted state, the Regia Aeronautica attempted a strategic attack on Gibraltar on 19 July with 10 SM.79GAs, but only two managed to reach their target, again without achieving any result. During September 1943, the last offensive operation involving the type was conducted, and resulted in the damaging of the LST 417, on 7 September 1943.

On 8 September, when the Armistice with Italy was announced, the Regia Aeronautica had no fewer than 61 SM.79s, of which 36 were operational. Following the signing of the Armistice, the SM.79s based in southern Italy (34 altogether) were used by the Italian Co-Belligerent Air Force as transport aircraft in support of the Allies; those that remained in the North (believed to number roughly 36 aircraft) continued to fight along German forces as part of the Aeronautica Nazionale Repubblicana or were incorporated into the Luftwaffe. A small number of SM.79s remained in service in the post-war Aeronautica Militare, where they served as passenger transports into the early 1950s.

===== RSI service: 1943–1945 =====
After the Armistice, the Repubblica Sociale Italiana (RSI) decided to continue using the SM.79s as torpedo-bombers. But only 15 more Sparvieri were built after the armistice, while five were overhauled by the Reggiane factories. Counting the aircraft taken over from the Regia Aeronautica, new deliveries and aircraft in workshops and depots, the Aeronautica Nazionale Repubblicana (ANR) had 73 SM.79 at its disposal. They were mostly SM.79-III type. This version featured strengthened armament and had no ventral "bathtub" turret. They were based mostly in Venegono. Two secondary bases were Merna di Gorizia and Perugia, in Umbria.

The first missions attempted to oppose the Anzio landings, where the British and American forces had landed on 22 January 1944. On the evening of 10 March, a flight of six ANR SM.79s attacked Allied merchant ships near the Anzio-Nettuno beachhead, during which a single Sparviero was lost. On the night of 13–14 March five SM.79s repeated the attack.

The Gruppo Buscaglia suffered heavy losses on 4 April, when 13 unescorted SM.79s, during a ferry flight from Lonate Pozzolo to Perugia, were bounced by P-47s: five Sparvieri were shot down and 27 crew members were killed. According to other sources, this encounter occurred on 6 April and four out of seven SM.79s were shot down, while the other three crash-landed. During one of the missions on Anzio, Comandante Carlo Faggioni was killed. On 10 April 1944, four SM.79s took off to attack the Anzio bridgehead. Capitano Faggioni's aircraft was hit by AA fire and crashed into the sea; only one Sparviero was able to return to base. Immediately thereafter, Capitano Marino Marini took command of the torpedo-bomber group; early on, Marini set about planning a mission over Gibraltar.

For this mission, 12 SM.79 bis models were used. They had enhanced engines, armoured shields for the lateral machine guns, an additional 1,000 L (260 US gal) fuel tank in the bomb bay, and had the bombardier's nacelle removed. Even these modifications could not provide sufficient range to achieve the necessary distance that the mission required, and so all weapons except one were removed, one member of crew was left behind, and the fuel load was increased to 5,000 L (1,300 US gal). To reach Gibraltar, it was necessary to take off from Istres, in Southern France, and then fly for a total of 2,700 km (1,700 mi). Of the 12 aircraft that departed from Istres on 5 June 1944, 10 reached their target (according to other sources, ten SM.79s took off on 4 June and nine reached the target). The defenders were taken by surprise, and all aircraft successfully launched torpedoes, but three SM.79s ran out of fuel and were forced to land in Spain. Initial claims by the Italians were four ships sunk, totalling 27,216 t (26,786 long tons; 30,001 short tons). German observers in Algeciras, in Spain, reported that four ships, totalling 30,000 t (30,000 long tons; 33,000 short tons) were badly damaged and that two others had been hit. British sources however stated that no ships were lost, due to an effective system of defence. Regardless, this was the largest enemy incursion over Gibraltar in four years of war and this operation demonstrated the flying skill of the Republican torpedo airmen.

The following data shows the decline in effectiveness of the SM.79 as a torpedo bomber:

- During 1940, two squadrons made 39 sorties and 17 attacks; the damaging of 27,578 tonnes (30,400 tons) of shipping was attributed to these squadrons in this period.
- In 1941, a total of 14 squadrons conducted 225 sorties and 87 attacks, which were responsible for the sinking of nine ships (42,373 tonnes/47,700 tons) and another 12 being damaged (75,841 tonnes/83,600 tons).
- During 1942, 24 squadrons comprising 307 aircraft performed 60 attacks, sinking 10 ships (27,624 tonnes/30,450 tons) and damaging three 29,157 tonnes (32,140 tons).
- In 1943, 18 squadrons made 221 combat sorties, during which three ships were sunk (12,519 tonnes/13,800 tons) and another four were damaged (32,024 tonnes/35,300 tons).

During July 1944, several SM.79s were transferred to Eleusis/Athens base to carry out sorties in the Eastern Mediterranean. Their crews achieved some successes then and came back to Lonate Pozzolo on 12 August. In October, this formation was renamed Gruppo O.M. Carlo Faggioni. After a time, the RSI torpedo-bombers based in Ghedi in October 1944 became operative again, with 10 aircraft. On 25 December 1944 they attacked a convoy in Adriatic Sea off Ancona, and Capitano Bertuzzi hit a 7,000-ton freighter with a torpedo. The following day, a formation of Republic P-47 Thunderbolt destroyed 14 "Sparvieri" on Lonate Pozzolo airfield. The only two serviceable SM.79s left flew the last operational mission of the group and sank a 5,000-ton ship in the Adriatic off the Dalmatian coast.

===== Results against Allied warships =====
Throughout the conflict, SM.79s were credited with the sinking of a number of Allied warships, including the destroyer HMS Fearless on 23 July 1941, the destroyer HMS Bedouin on 15 June 1942, the destroyer HMAS Nestor on 16 June 1942, the destroyer HMS Foresight on 13 August 1942, the sloop HMS Ibis on 10 November 1942, the corvette HMS Marigold on 9 December 1942, the auxiliary anti-aircraft ship HMS Pozarica on 29 January 1943.

Additionally, several more Allied warships were torpedoed and suffered serious damage as a result of attacks by the SM.79s. These included the heavy cruiser HMS Kent on 18 September 1940, the light cruiser HMS Liverpool twice, on 8 October 1940 and on 14 June 1942, the light cruiser HMS Glasgow on 7 December 1940, the light cruiser HMS Manchester on 23 July 1941, the light cruiser HMS Phoebe on 27 August 1941, the battleship HMS Nelson on 23 September 1941, the light cruiser HMS Arethusa on 18 November 1942, and the aircraft carrier HMS Indomitable on 16 July 1943.

==== Radio controlled flying bomb ====
During 1942, General Ferdinando Raffaelli reportedly came up with the idea of packing an SM.79 with explosives and a radio control device. On 12 August 1942, as the Operation Pedestal convoy was steaming off the Algerian coast, a SM.79 drone, a Z.1007bis guide plane and an escort of five FIAT G.50 fighters flew out to intercept it. Once the pilot of the SM.79 had set his aircraft on a course toward the Allied ships he bailed out, leaving the Z.1007bis crew to guide the flying bomb the rest of the way by radio. However, the radio controls malfunctioned and with nothing to guide it the SM.79 drone cruised along until it ran out of fuel and crashed into Mount Khenchela on the Algerian mainland. Raffaelli later developed a simpler single-engined guided bomb, the Ambrosini A.R.4, which was tested in June 1943, but the armistice intervened before it could go into production. Another proposal suggested using a parasite Macchi C.202 coupled with a SM.79 or A.R.4 in an arrangement similar to the German Mistel, but with the fighter remotely guiding the bomber to its target.

==== Notable crewmembers ====
Among the men who became famous through serving in the Regia Aeronautica, the Sparviero crews became even more renowned than fighter aces because of the initial records set, the successful raids in Spain, especially those made by the "Green Mice" (I sorci verdi), and the torpedo missions carried out during the war which became the subject of fascist propaganda. Among the men famous for serving in Sparvieri were:

- Giulio Cesare Graziani (relative of Marshal Rodolfo Graziani), who before joining the 132nd Torpedo Squadron, was badly wounded in an encounter with RAF Hurricanes and made a forced landing in the Ethiopian desert. Postwar, he later rose to the rank of Lieutenant General of the Air Force.
- Carlo Faggioni, one of the more skilled pilots, who was shot down in 1944 during the Anzio landings. Only his hat was recovered from the sea.
- Martino Aichner (nicknamed "Dolphin"), who made an inauspicious start to his career by hitting the sea during a low-level run in training that destroyed the propellers of both wing-mounted engines of his Sparviero, and running on only the power of the central engine, managed a sea landing. He was involved in the sinking of the already crippled destroyer HMS Bedouin on 15 June 1942, which was able to shoot down his bomber, forcing him to ditch in the sea, and in 1943 he was forced to make a third landing in the sea.
- Emilio Pucci became a designer after the war.
- Guido Cimicchi, Dequal, Robone and Faggioni, who were some of the early torpedo bomber pilots.
- Carlo Emanuele Buscaglia, perhaps the most famous and highest scoring SM.79 pilot, who was involved in the torpedoing of the Kent and the Glasgow, and was shot down in December 1942. After the Italian Armistice Buscaglia joined the Italian Co-Belligerent Air Force; while flying a Martin Baltimore, he crashed during takeoff and died as a result of his injuries the day after.
- Italo Balbo, notable Italian pilot, air marshal and military commander during the Second World War, who was shot down over Tobruk by friendly fire, an incident that Balbo's closest friends and family strongly believed was an assassination ordered by Mussolini. Historians have generally accepted that this incident was an accident.

=== Yugoslavia ===
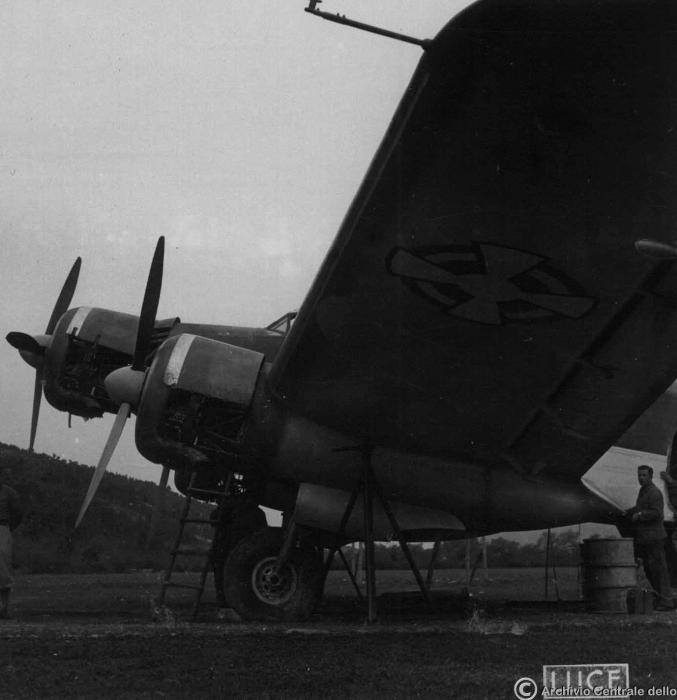
A Royal Yugoslav Air Force SM.79

Favourable reports of the type's reliability and performance during the Spanish Civil War led to the 1938 Kingdom of Yugoslavia's order of 45 aircraft generally similar to the SM.79-I variant, designated the SM.79K. They were delivered to Yugoslavia in 1939, but most were destroyed during the 1941 Axis invasion by their crews or by advancing Axis forces. During several sorties against German and Italian forces they managed some success in Kačanik Gorge. Some of these aircraft escaped to Greece, carrying King Peter Karadjordjevic and his entourage. A few survived, one to be pressed into service with the pro-Axis forces of the NDH, and four which became AX702-AX705 in the RAF.

=== Romania ===
During 1937, the Romanian government decided to place an order for 24 twin-engined SM.79B bombers, fitted with 746 kW (1,000 hp) Gnome-Rhône Mistral Major 14K radial engines. These aircraft, however, proved to be underpowered. Consequently, in February 1940, Romania ordered from Italy a further eight aircraft, which were each equipped with two Junkers Jumo 211 inline engines of 1,200 PS (880 kW). These aircraft were designated JIS 79 (J for Jumo, I for Italy and S for Savoia) and were delivered in 1941–2. A further 72 SM.79s were built under licence by the Industria Aeronautică Română (IAR) and designated JRS 79B (J for Jumo, R for Romania, S for Savoia). Another license-built version was the JRS 79B1, which was armed with a single 20 mm Ikaria cannon and fitted with an enlarged cockpit for a fifth crew member. Due to its role in low-level attacks, the type frequently suffered heavy losses.

=== Others ===
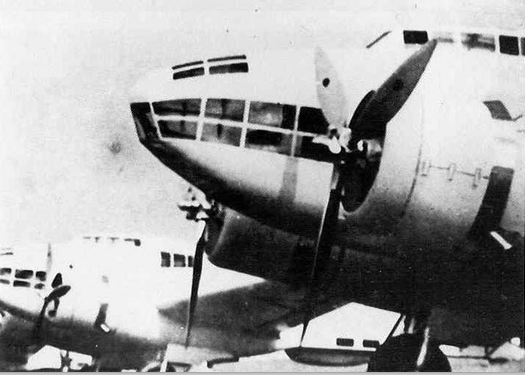
Savoia Marchetti SM.79 Bs Iraq Air force

A number of twin-engined versions were sold to Brazil (three with 694 kW (931 hp) Alfa Romeo 128 RC.18 engines) and Iraq (four with 768 kW (1,030 hp) Fiat A.80 RC.14 engines).

== Variants ==
SM.79
Prototype S.79P (civil variant), powered by radial engines Piaggio Stella P.IX (610 cv). Roll-out 28 September 1934. The first flight was conducted on 8 October 1934. During spring 1935, it was re-equipped with Alfa Romeo 125 RC.35 (590–750 cv) and used as fast airliner for Regia Aeronautica and for some reconnaissance missions over Ethiopia.
SM.79-I (also known as S.79K or S.79 Militare)
The first production four- or five-seat bomber version powered by three 582 kW (780 hp) Alfa Romeo 126 RC.34 nine-cylinder engines. Span 21.20 m (69.6 ft), length 15.80 m (51.8 ft), max speed 430 km/h (270 mph) at 4,000 m (13,000 ft), up to 1,250 kg (2,760 lb) of bombs, max takeoff weight 10,480 kg (23,100 lb), range 1,899 km (1,180 mi). First flights: the prototype MM.260 (the former civil version S-79P converted) 20 May 1936, still with the AR.125 engines. First production S.79-I MM.20663(also known as S.79K or S.79M) 7 July 1936, delivered to Regia Aeronautica on 29 July 1936. After the first three, the next production models had the AR.126 RC.34 (780 cv), the first one flew on 27 September 1936.
SM.79-II
Torpedo-bomber powered by three improved Alfa Romeo 126 engines, bomb bay removed and often crew armour added. One had three Piaggio P.XI engines.

Savoia-Marchetti S.M.79-I

SM.79-III
Improved, extended range torpedo bomber introduced during late 1942. It was not available in significant numbers until mid-1943. Known also as SM.79bis, SM.79GA, or SM.579. Powered by 746 kW (1,000 hp) AR.128 engines, increasing speed to 475 km/h (295 mph), and climb to 5,000 m (16,000 ft) in 16 minutes 7 sec). Ventral nacelle deleted. 1,000 L (260 US gal) fuel tank mounted in the bomb bay. The forward machine gun was retained, with flash protection as an anti-ship weapon.

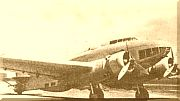
Savoia-Marchetti S.M.79B

SM.79B
Twin-engine export version powered by the Fiat A.80 engines and with a glazed nose for improved bomb-aiming. More economical but slower (420 km/h (260 mph)) and 21.45 minutes to 5,000 m (16,000 ft) than the standard SM.79, but weighing 6,600–10,100 kg (14,600–22,300 lb), 500 kg (1,100 lb) less than the basic SM.79), was longer (16.22 m (53.2 ft)), and had the same armament. Iraq bought five.
SM.79C
VIP transport, powered by Piaggio P.XI RC.40 engines, with the dorsal and ventral machine guns removed.
SM.79JR
Twin-engine version for Romania, powered by 895 kW (1,200 hp) Junkers Jumo 211Da engines. Eight Italian built aircraft (designated JIS.79B by Romania), followed by 36 license built JRS 79B powered by the Jumo 211Da and 36 JRS 79B1 with 1,029 kW (1,380 hp) Jumo 211F engines. Production continued until 1946.
SM.79K
Version for Yugoslavia.
SM.79T
Long-range VIP transport version.
SM.79 Flying Bomb
An SM.79 converted into a radio-controlled flying bomb, remotely guided by a CANT Z.1007 "Alcione".(one built)

== Operators ==
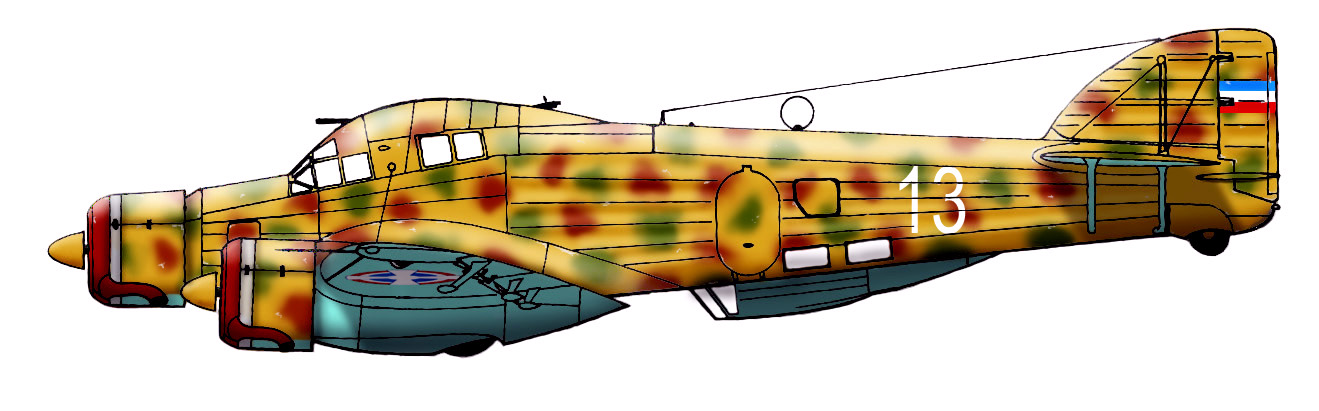
SM.79 of the Yugoslav Royal Air Force

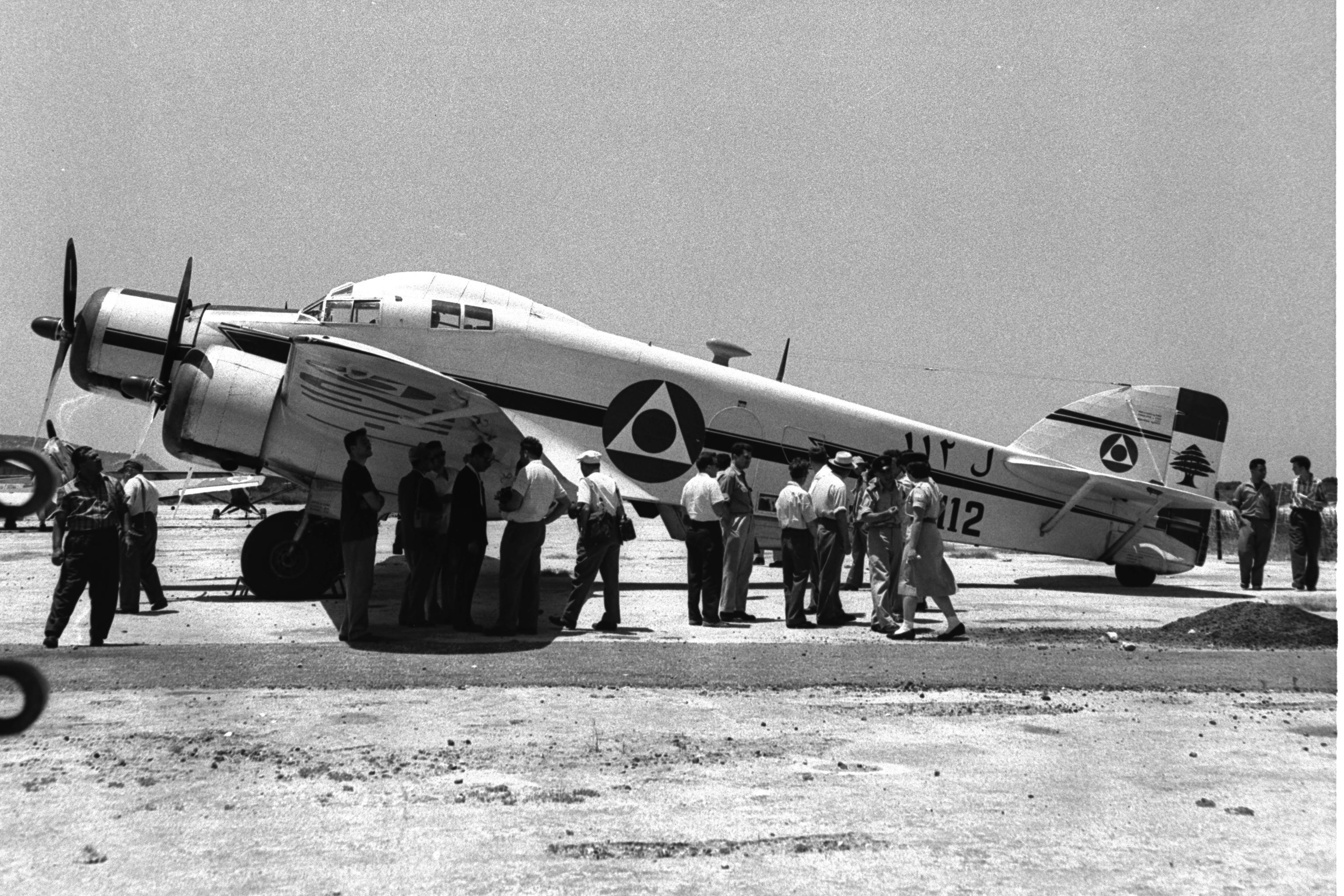
Lebanese SM.79

Wartime
Brazil

- Brazilian Air Force received two SM.79 aircraft and then bought another one of the same version.

Greece

- Royal Hellenic Air Force operated one SM.79-I that had been captured during a counter-offensive in Albania in November 1940.

Independent State of Croatia

- Zrakoplovstvo Nezavisne Države Hrvatske operated a few ex-Yugoslavian aircraft.

Nazi Germany

- Luftwaffe operated several captured aircraft.

Iraq

- Royal Iraqi Air Force operated four aircraft during the Anglo-Iraqi War

Kingdom of Italy

- Regia Aeronautica
- Aviazione Legionaria
- Italian Co-Belligerent Air Force

Italian Social Republic

- Aeronautica Nazionale Repubblicana

Kingdom of Romania

- Royal Romanian Air Force

Spanish State

- Spanish Air Force

Kingdom of Yugoslavia

- Yugoslav Royal Air Force

United Kingdom

- Royal Air Force - After the Axis invasion of Yugoslavia, No. 117 Squadron RAF operated four ex-Yugoslav SM.79s K in the Middle East, from May 1941 to November 1941

Postwar
Italy

- Italian Air Force operated some aircraft until 1955

Lebanon

- Lebanese Air Force ordered four SM.79L bomber aircraft in 1946, which were delivered in 1949 and used as military transports. These aircraft appeared in the 1954 war film They Who Dare.

== Mishaps and combat losses ==
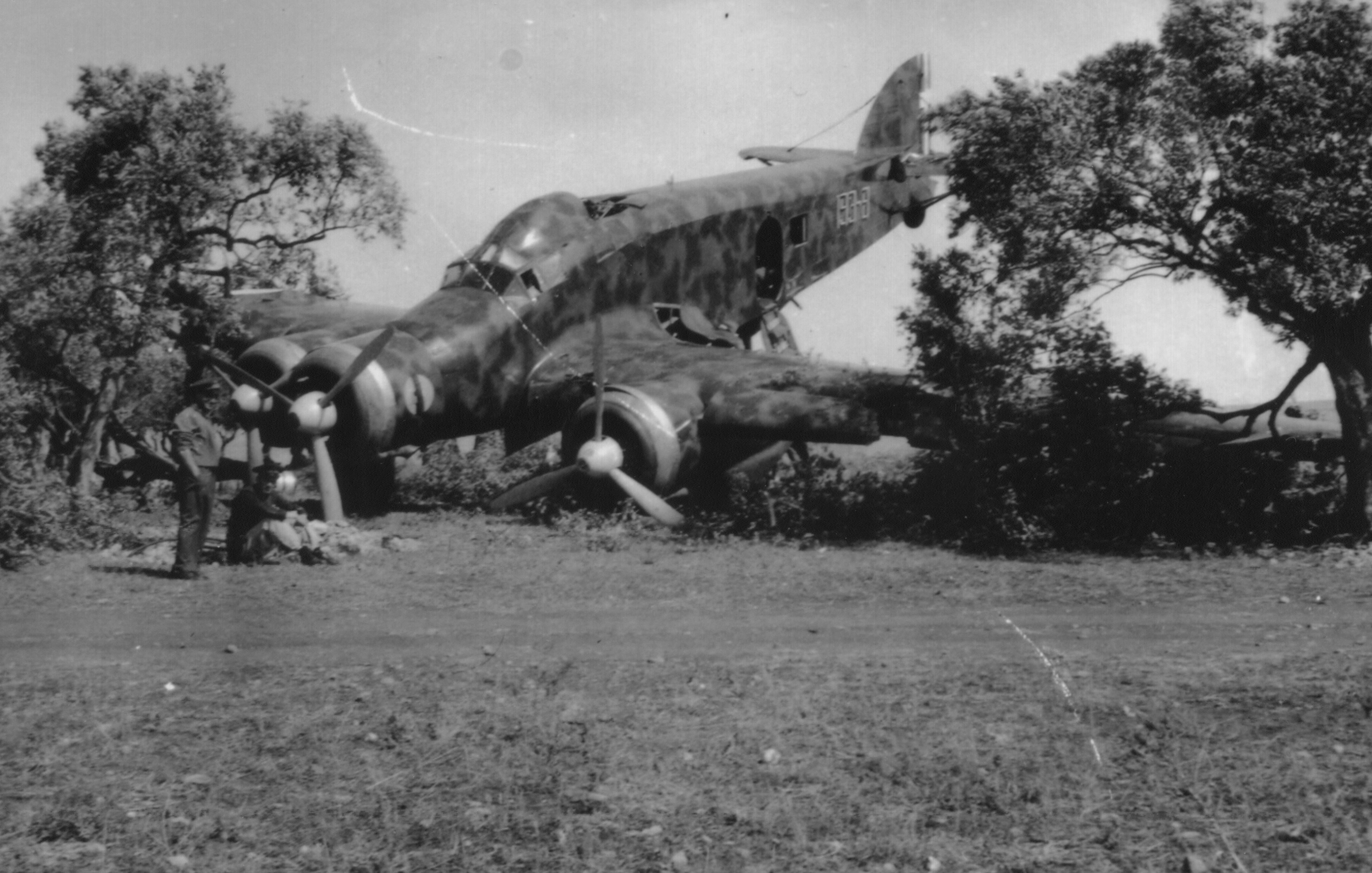
A SM.79 following a crash landing, circa 1940

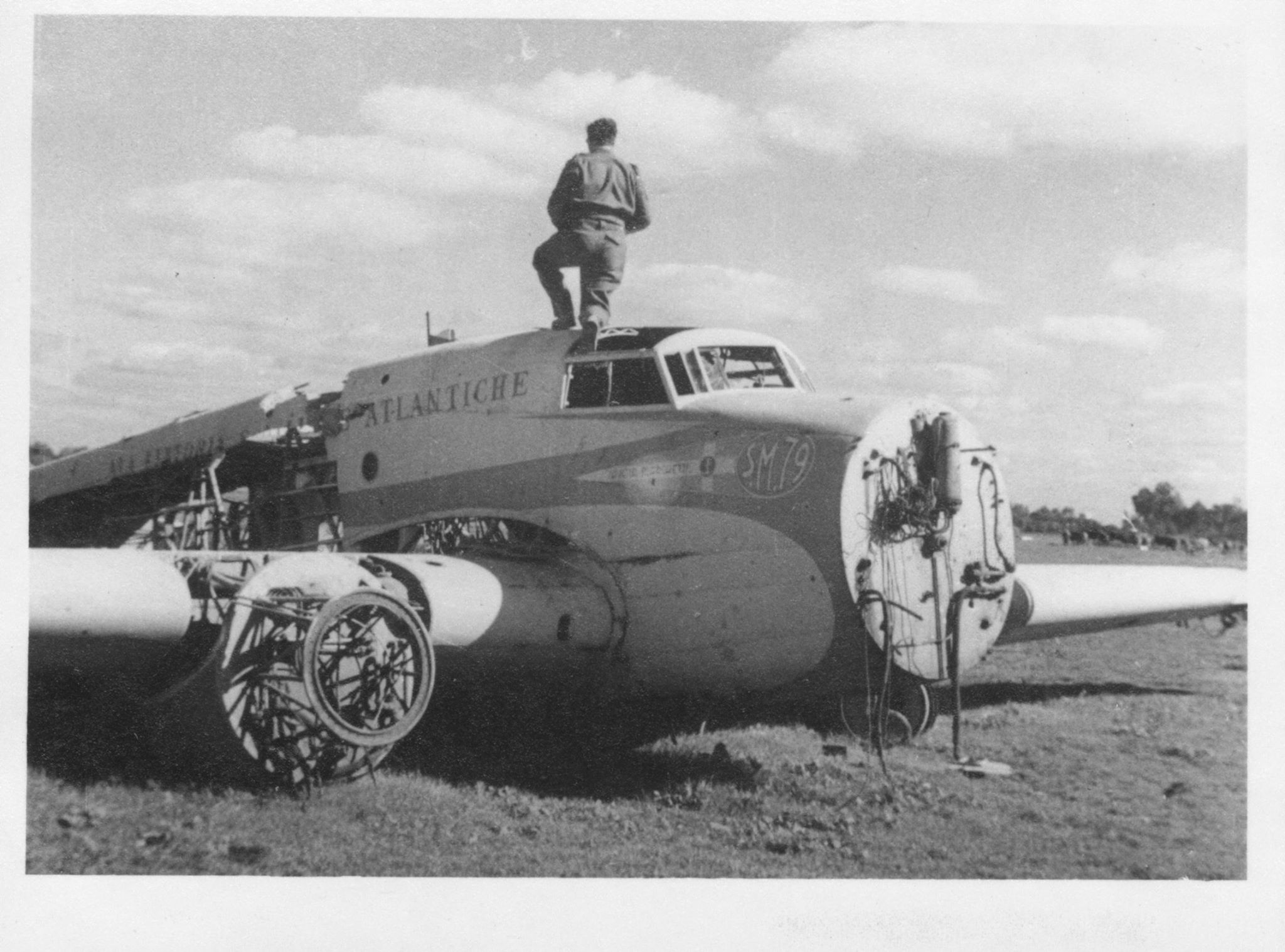
A heavily damaged SM.79, circa 1943

While the SM.79 was often considered overall to be a relatively sturdy and well-developed aircraft, the type experienced its share of misfortune.

In Spain, SM.79 MM.28-16 (with a total crew of 17) was destroyed in the air on 12 April 1938, when one of its bombs detonated in the bomb bay. MM.28-25 (again with a crew of 17) was lost when another SM.79 damaged by anti-aircraft guns collided with it on 23 March. A further SM.79, MM.28-16 was damaged by an anti-aircraft shell, and landed with dead and wounded on-board (4 January 1939). On 30 June 1939 two of the aircraft, 13-6 and 13-7, both carrying a full fuel load, collided and crashed, with the entire crew of nine killed on impact.

On 27 April 1939, an SM.79 carrying experienced aviators Major Alessandro Miglia and Col. Jacopo Calò Carducci disappeared while flying from Tripoli to El-Maden in Italian Libya. The aircraft is presumed to have been lost in the desert during a severe Ghibli storm; no wreckage was ever found.

At the beginning of World War II, on 13 June 1940, six Sparvieri of 9° Stormo (Wing) bombed Ghisonaccia airfield, in Corsica, but one was shot down by anti-aircraft guns and became the first Sparviero downed in that war.

The 9° Stormo continued to suffer heavy losses in Africa. Initially used to harass light forces operating in the desert, the Sparvieros were subsequently sent against the British advanced columns in Operation Compass. On 16 December 1940, six Sparvieros were sent over As Sallum to counter enemy armoured units, but before they could reach their target, three of the lead section were shot down with the loss of 16 men, including Commander Mario Aramu. The wing was put out of action and the personnel were sent back to Italy aboard the RM Città di Messina, but on 14 January 1941 the ship was sunk by submarine HMS Regent, with the loss of 432 men, including 53 members of the 9°. The wing was later re-formed with Z.1007s.

- 9–11 July 1940: Battle of Calabria, one SM.79 (38th Gruppo) was downed by a Blackburn Skua of HMS Ark Royal. On 11 July, another SM.79 (90th Gruppo) was downed by a Gloster Sea Gladiator of HMS Eagle.
- 1 August 1940: an SM.79 was shot down by a Skua from Ark Royal. This was General Stefano Cagna's aircraft.
- 2 September, Operation Hats: the new Fairey Fulmar fighters based on HMS Illustrious downed a 41° Stormo SM.79.
- 4 September: another SM.79 (34th Gruppo) was downed by Fulmars.
- 12–14 October 1940, Operation MW 2: two SM.79 (36° Stormo) were downed by Fulmars from Illustrious.
- 10 January 1941, Battle of Taranto: a single Fulmar from Illustrious downed two SM.79s of 30° Stormo.
- 20–22 April 1941: one SM.79 (278ª Squadriglia, torpedo unit) was shot down on the 21st, another, from 34° Gruppo was shot down the next day, by Fulmars from HMS Formidable
- 8 May 1941, Operation Tiger: two SM.79s (38°Gruppo) were downed by the Ark Royal's Fulmars
- 21–25 July 1941, Operation Substance: 23 July, one SM.79 (38th) and two (283rd) torpedo bombers and on the 25th, one SM.79 (89th Gruppo) were shot down, all by Fulmars from Ark Royal.
- 12–17 June 1942, Operation Harpoon: Fulmars and Sea Hurricanes downed four SM.79s of 36° Stormo (torpedo-bombers) on 14 June. On 15 June another SM.79 (52° Gruppo) was shot down.
- 10–15 August 1942, Operation Pedestal: two SM.79s (109° and 132° Gruppo) were downed on 12 August.

The total number of reconnaissance, bomber and torpedo bombers downed in these two years by naval fighters was, not counting aircraft heavily damaged and eventually lost, 24 aircraft, 2% of total production.

A major safety issue in the operation of the SM.79 was the difference between the calculated and effective range figures, which led to several mishaps. Two accidents highlight the deficiencies in range of the Sparvieros.

One such incident befell the ferry flight of 27th Gruppo. This unit was transferred from Alghero to North Africa. The 16 Sparvieros took off at 11:50 of 4 April 1941, but one of the eight aircraft of the 18ª Squadriglia in the first wave had an accident and crashed on the airport strip. The other eight from 52ª Squadriglia could only take off 40 minutes later, while the first seven circled over the airfield. The 15 Sparvieros flew together until reaching Misurata, but the 18th squadriglia had flown for much longer and was short of fuel. Subsequently, its SM.79s crashed one after the other with only two landing safely. At least two were completely destroyed, and three damaged. On that day, on a simple ferry flight of 1,100 km, the 18th lost five Sparvieros and at least one crew, with many wounded. The flight of 52ª Sq lasted for 4 hours and 45 mins but 18ª Sq flew for 5h and 15 mins, without any payload, at an average speed of only 210 km/h.

=== MM. 23881 ===
Another such incident involved MM.23881 of the 278th, which took off from Berka on 21 April 1941, piloted by Captain Oscar Cimolini, with the intention of searching for enemy shipping near Crete. After an attack around 20:00 hours, it began the trip back to its base. The crew became disoriented and, unable to communicate due to a broken radio, missed their airfield in bad weather conditions. Exhausting their fuel supply the aircraft made a forced landing some 500 km (310 mi) away from its base. Some of the crew of six had suffered some injuries, but at least one crew member was able to leave to search for help. He walked for over 90 km (56 mi) in the desert, was overcome and died only eight kilometres from the Jalo–Giarabub road, where his remains were found by chance in 1960. Subsequent searches found the still largely intact SM.79 on 5 October 1960. The skeleton of one crew member (probably the pilot) was found still inside the cockpit; two more bodies were found outside the wreck. The other two crew members were never found; the finding of an additional clock on Romanini's body indicated that at least another crewman had accompanied him through the desert, but had died earlier on the march.

== Surviving aircraft ==
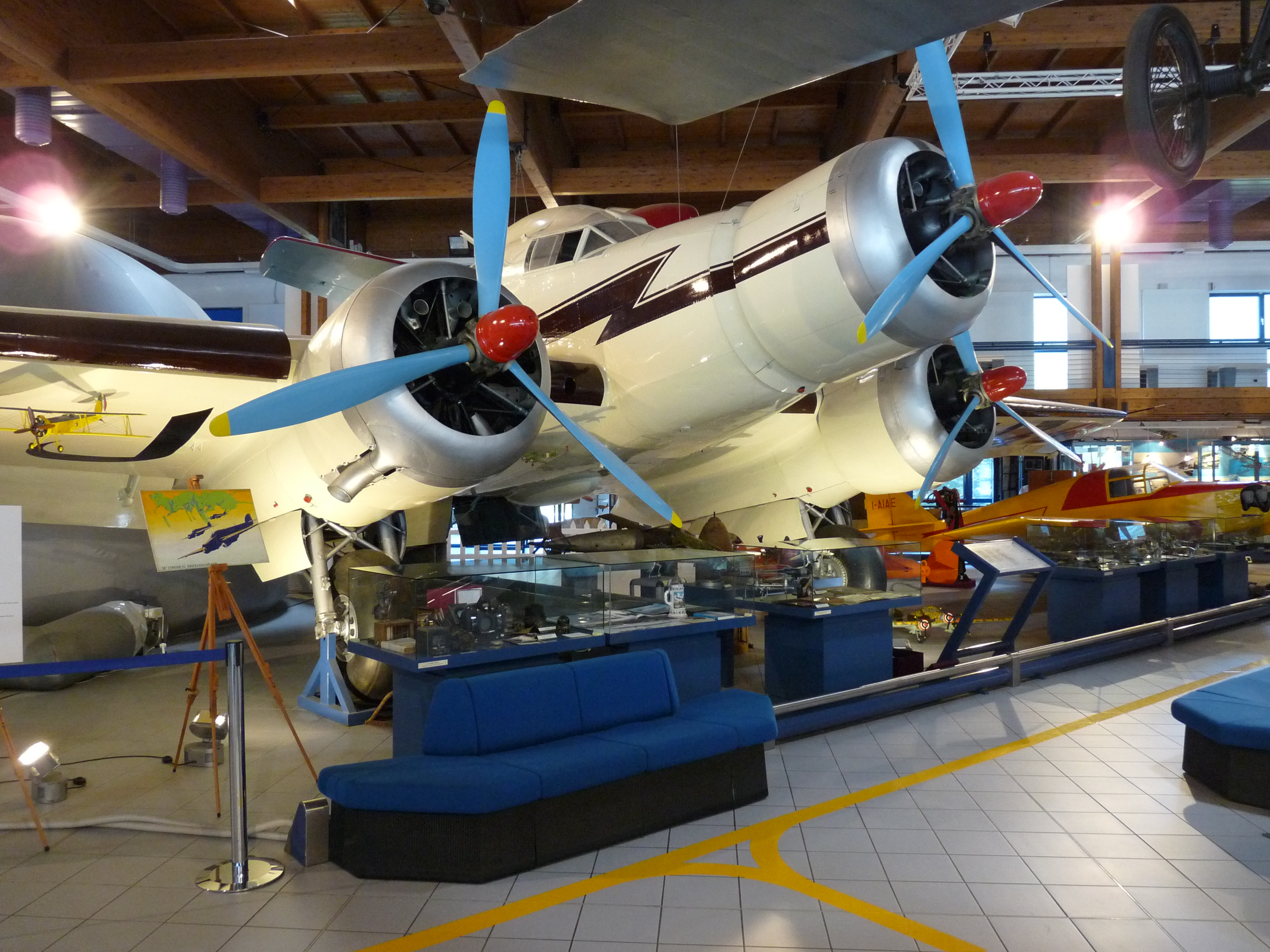
SM.79 at Museo dell'Aeronautica Gianni Caproni

There are two surviving complete SM.79s, both of which were donated by Lebanon to the Italian Air Force:

Italy

- MM24499 – SM.79 on static display at the Gianni Caproni Museum of Aeronautics in Trento, Trentino-Alto Adige/Südtirol.
- MM45508 – SM.79 on static display at the Italian Air Force Museum in Bracciano, Lazio.

In addition to the above complete examples, the remains of an SM.79 wrecked by LRDG R patrol are at the western landing ground at Jebel Uweinat.

The remains of an SM.79 were found off the coast of Kaş, Antalya.

== Specifications (SM.79-III) ==

Data from

General characteristics

- Crew: 6 (pilot, co-pilot, flight engineer/gunner, radio operator, bombardier, rear gunner)
- Length: 16.2 m (53 ft 2 in)
- Wingspan: 20.2 m (66 ft 3 in)
- Height: 4.1 m (13 ft 5 in)
- Wing area: 61.7 m^{2} (664 sq ft)
- Empty weight: 7,700 kg (16,976 lb)
- Gross weight: 10,050 kg (22,156 lb)
- Powerplant: 3 × Alfa 128 R.C.18 9-cylinder air-cooled radial piston engines, 642 kW (861 hp) each
- Propellers: 3-bladed variable-pitch propellers

Performance

- Maximum speed: 460 km/h (290 mph, 250 kn) at 3,790 m (12,430 ft)
- Range: 2,600 km (1,600 mi, 1,400 nmi)
- Service ceiling: 7,500 m (24,600 ft)
- Rate of climb: 5.3 m/s (1,040 ft/min)
- Wing loading: 165 kg/m^{2} (34 lb/sq ft)
- Power/mass: 0.173 kW/kg (0.105 hp/lb)

Armament

- Guns:
  - 1 × 12.7 mm (0.5 in) forward Breda-SAFAT machine gun
  - 2 × 12.7 mm (0.5 in) dorsal Breda-SAFAT machine gun 1 at the top, 1 in the belly (optional).
  - 2 × 7.7 mm (0.303 in) machine guns in lateral "waist-gun" ports (optional).
- Bombs: 1,200 kg (2,646 lb) internal bomb load or two external 450 mm (17.7 in) torpedoes.

== See also ==
Aircraft of comparable role, configuration, and era

- Armstrong Whitworth Whitley
- Douglas B-18 Bolo
- Fiat BR.20 Cicogna
- Handley Page Hampden
- Heinkel He 111
- Ilyushin DB-3
- Junkers Ju 86
- Martin B-10
- Mitsubishi G3M Rikko

Related lists

- List of aircraft of World War II
- List of bomber aircraft
- List of interwar military aircraft
