= Giorgio Graffer =

World War II Italian combat pilot

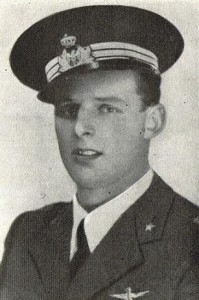
- Born: 14 May 1912; Trento, Italy
- Died: 28 November 1940 (aged 28); Delvinaki, Greece
- Military career
- Allegiance: Italy
- Branch: Regia Aeronautica
- Service years: 15 June 1940 – 28 November 1940
- Rank: capitano
- Unit: 53º Stormo
- Awards: Medaglia d'Oro al Valor Militare "alla memoria" Bronze Medal of Military Valor

Giorgio Graffer (14 May 1912 - 28 November 1940) was an Italian combat pilot in World War II, credited with 5 aerial victories, making him an Ace.

Graffer was considered an outstanding student on the Leone course of the Accademia Aeronautica. At the beginning of Italy's participation in war hostilities he commanded 365 Squadriglia, 150° Gruppo, 53 Stormo°, based near the French border.

On the night of 13/14 August 1940, Graffer performed the first night-time interception by an Italian airforce pilot when, flying a Fiat CR.42, he attacked a RAF Whitley bomber whose target was Turin. After the guns of Graffer's aircraft jammed, he continued his action by ramming the enemy aircraft which, in attempting to return to its base, crashed into the English Channel. Graffer successfully parachuted to safety and was subsequently awarded the Bronze Medal for Military Valour.

Graffer was further involved in action during the early stages of the Invasion of Greece, during which time he shot down a further 4 aircraft. In an action against RAF Gloster Gladiator aircraft of 80 Squadron, Graffer was shot down and killed on 28 November 1940. He was posthumously awarded the Gold Medal of Military Valor.

== Bibliography ==
- Massimello, Giovanni and Giorgio Apostolo. Italian Aces of World War Two. Oxford: Osprey Publishing, 2000. ISBN 978-1-84176-078-0.
