= Caproni Ca.165 =

Italian biplane fighter prototype

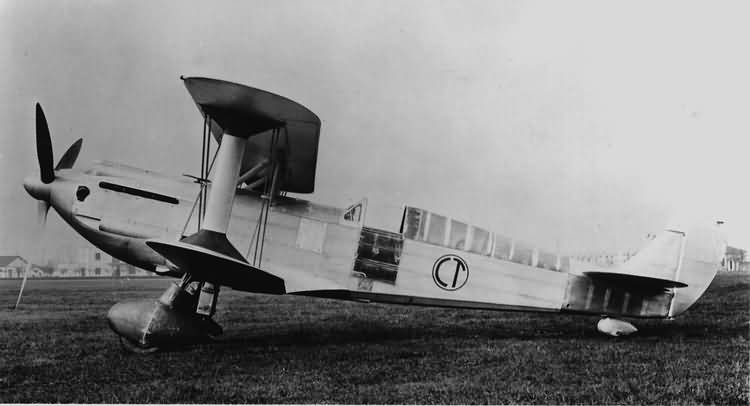
- Caproni Ca.165 in its initial form, c. 1938

General information
- Type: Fighter
- Manufacturer: Caproni
- Designer: Raffaele Conflenti
- Primary user: Regia Aeronautica (intended)
- Number built: 1

History
- First flight: 16 February 1938
- Retired: 1939

The Caproni Ca.165 was an Italian biplane fighter developed just before World War II, but produced only as a prototype, as the competing Fiat CR.42 Falco was selected for series production.

== Design ==
Although known for three-engine heavy bombers, Caproni had a long history with fighters, starting in 1914 with an interceptor monoplane with a single machine gun, and a monoplane. This was innovative for its time, but it had also no success, as had almost all the fighters proposed in the next decades.

Many types of machines were developed by Italian industries prior to World War II, and some were produced at least in limited numbers, but this would not be the case with the Ca.165, a biplane fighter proposed for a fighter contest. In February 1938, it flew for the first time as a prototype.

The Ca.165 had a mixed construction. The fuselage was framed in steel with a skin of light alloys, while the wing was built out of wood with fabric skin. Finally, the tail was metallic, also covered in fabric.

The Ca.165 had a narrow fuselage featuring an enclosed cockpit. The undercarriage was fixed with spatted wheels. A unique feature of the Ca.165 was the retractable radiator, which the pilot could deploy for optimum performance, or retract depending on the flight conditions: completely open in climbs, or closed in level flight and dives. In this way, it was similar to the Morane-Saulnier M.S.406. When deployed, the radiator significantly increased the drag on the aircraft, but increased engine performance and reliability.

The engine was a V-12 671 kW (900 hp) Isotta Fraschini L.121 R.C.40 driving a three-bladed Alfa Romeo electric propeller. Top speed was around 465 km/h (289 mph) at 5,350 m (17,550 ft) with a 10,000 m (32,810 ft) ceiling. The range was relatively small, around 672 km (418 mi). Dimensions were 8.1 m (26.6 ft) length, 9.3 m (30.5 ft) height, 2.8 m (9.2 ft) wingspan, 21.4 m^{2} (230.3 ft^{2}) wing surface. The weight was 1,855/2,435 kg (4,090/5,368 lb), with 570 kg ( lb) of payload.

After several modifications, the Ca.165 had the tail surface augmented and the aft fuselage lowered to fit a canopy with 360° visibility.

== Testing and evaluation ==
At Guidonia, the aircraft was tested like the many other fighters present for evaluation. However, it was only tested against the Fiat CR.42 Falco, the only other biplane. In mock fights the Ca.165 outperformed the CR.42, thanks to the superior aerodynamics and available power. Despite this, the aircraft was rated inferior as the CR. 42 was more maneuverable and employed a reliable powerplant while the Caproni engine was experimental and had poor reliability. However, the Ca.165 was declared the "winner" of the mock fights, so General Valle ordered 12 examples on 2 September 1939, although the order was cancelled on 11 October 1939 and changed to 12 Caproni F.5s. This production shift was made even though it involved the payment of a penalty.

The Ca.165 was comparable in useful load (570 kg/1,257 lb vs. 575 kg/1,268 lb) and weapons (2 × 12.7 mm/0.5 in, 1 × 7.7 mm/0.303 in) to the CR.42, but it was 200 kg (441 lb) heavier with less wing surface, so it had wing loading of 113 kg/m compared to 99 for the CR.42; and that, coupled with the less effective controls, made the Ca.165 less agile. Despite these shortcomings, the Ca. 165's minimum speed was lower (114 km/h/71 mph vs 122 km/h/76 mph), allowing for shorter takeoff runs and slightly better low-speed performance.

The Ca.165 had a very slim and small fuselage, but was heavier than the CR.42, which was due, arguably, to the different engine and construction. The Caproni was not really a 'turning fighter', but given the limits of biplanes, was more of an 'energy fighter' with more pronounced capabilities in speed than turning (as was emphasized by the test pilots). An improved version was designed to address the maneuverability limitations, but the development was interrupted. It was built with non-strategic materials (steel and wood mainly), so it could have been at an advantage in the war in terms of strain on the materials industry, but given the type of engine, it is unclear if it was an economically practical aircraft.

Caproni tried other ways to improve this powerful biplane, first with the 746 kW (1,000 hp) Piaggio P.XI radial engine, then with a 746 kW (1,000 hp) Isotta Fraschini L.170 liquid-cooled powerplant, and the redesigned sesquiplane wings as the Ca.173. None of these proposals were successful, at least not enough to pique the interest of the Regia Aeronautica. In any case, both engines were far from being sufficiently reliable and were never adopted in large numbers by the Italian air force.

== Cancellation ==
Perhaps the influence of Fiat contributed to the selection of the CR.42 Falco over the Ca.165, although Caproni was an influential company itself at the time. Apparently the bottom line was that the Ca.165's engine was much less reliable and only 44 kW (60 hp) more powerful, while the aircraft itself was 200 kg (440 lb) heavier.

The Ca.165, despite being considered the winner in the mock fights, lost the final evaluation. Apparently, test pilots flying the Ca.165 managed to outperform the Falco but disliked the aircraft itself. The faster speed was a more modern concept for a new generation fighter (especially in the interception of fast bombers such as the Bristol Blenheim, which often proved too fast for the Falco), and speed was an increasingly important design consideration in World War II-era aircraft. The engine's poor reliability was also apparent, and when considering which aircraft to produce, this could have been a disadvantage as well.

In any case, the Ca.165 was produced in only a single prototype and so vanished from history; instead the Fiat CR.42 became the most produced Italian fighter, despite its overall obsolescence, with almost 1,800 examples built until 1944.

== Specifications (Ca.165) ==
Data from

General characteristics

- Crew: 1
- Length: 8.1 m (26 ft 7 in)
- Wingspan: 9.3 m (30 ft 6 in)
- Height: 2.8 m (9 ft 2 in)
- Wing area: 21.4 m^{2} (230 sq ft)
- Empty weight: 1,855 kg (4,090 lb)
- Max takeoff weight: 2,435 kg (5,368 lb)
- Powerplant: 1 × Isotta Fraschini L.121 R.C.40 V-12 liquid-cooled piston engine, 671 kW (900 hp)
- Propellers: 3-bladed constant-speed propeller

Performance

- Maximum speed: 450 km/h (280 mph, 240 kn) at 4,999 m (16,400 ft)
- Cruise speed: 378 km/h (235 mph, 204 kn)
- Stall speed: 114 km/h (71 mph, 62 kn)
- Landing speed: 110 km/h (68 mph; 59 kn)
- Range: 672 km (418 mi, 363 nmi)
- Service ceiling: 10,000 m (33,000 ft)
- Wing loading: 113 kg/m^{2} (23 lb/sq ft)

Armament

- Guns: 2 × 12.7 mm (0.5 in) machine guns
