= Fiat CR.42 Falco =

Italian sesquiplane fighter

CR.42 Falco
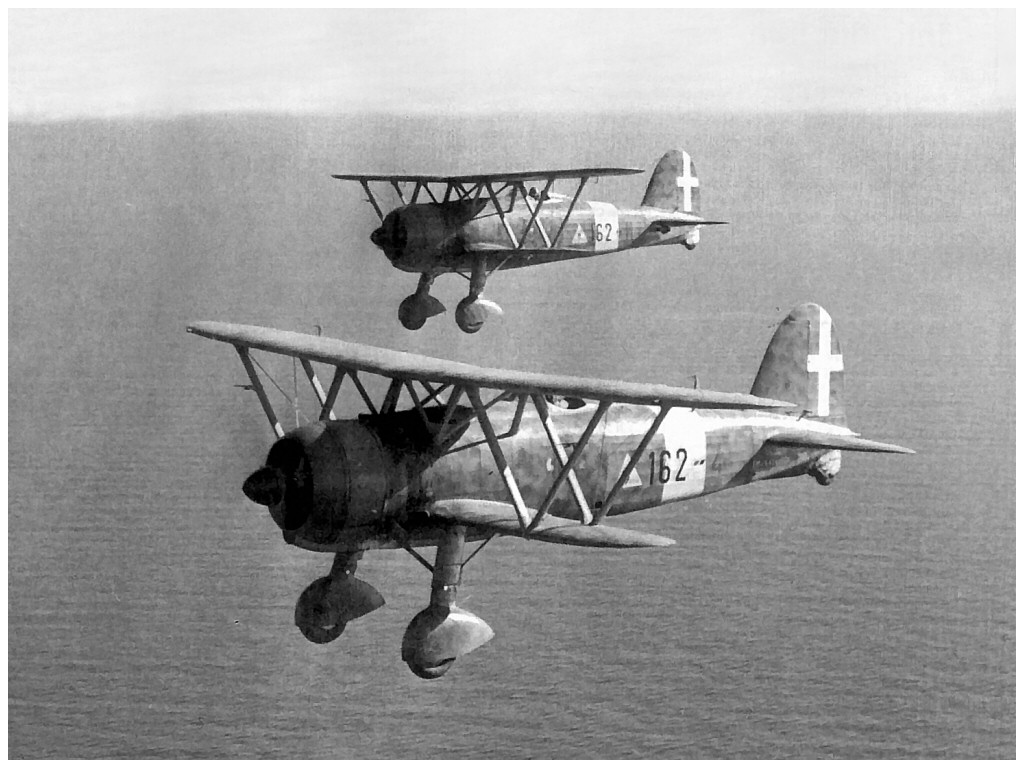
- Two CR.42's of 162^{a} Squadriglia, 161° "Autonomous Terrestrial Fighter Group", Aegean Islands 1940

General information
- Type: Fighter
- National origin: Italy
- Manufacturer: Fiat Aviazione
- Status: Out of service
- Primary users: Regia Aeronautica Swedish Air Force; Hungarian Air Force; Belgian Air Force
- Number built: 1,817–1,819

History
- Manufactured: c. February 1939 – late 1943
- Introduction date: 1939
- First flight: 23 May 1938
- Retired: 1948 Spanish Air Force
- Developed from: Fiat CR.32

The Fiat CR.42 Falco (Falcon, plural: Falchi) is a single-seat sesquiplane fighter developed and produced by Italian aircraft manufacturer Fiat Aviazione. It served primarily in the Regia Aeronautica (Royal Italian Air Force) in the 1930s and during the Second World War.

The CR.42 was a development of Fiat’s earlier CR.32 fighter, powered by the more powerful supercharged Fiat A.74R1C.38 air-cooled radial engine and with improvements. It proved to be relatively agile in flight, attributed to its very low wing loading and a sometimes decisive tactical advantage. RAF Intelligence praised its exceptional manoeuvrability, further noting that "the plane was immensely strong", though it was technically outclassed by faster, more heavily armed monoplanes. While primarily used as a fighter, variants such as the CR.42CN night-fighter model, the CR.42AS ground-attack aircraft, and the CR.42B Biposto twin-seat trainer aircraft had other roles.

During May 1939, the CR.42 entered service with the Regia Aeronautica; it was the last of the Fiat biplane fighters to enter front line service. By 10 June 1940, when Italy entered the Second World War, roughly 300 had been delivered; these defended metropolitan areas and important military installations at first. By the end of 1940, the Falco had been involved in combat on various fronts, including the Battle of France, the Battle of Britain, Malta, North Africa, and Greece. By the end of the war, Italian CR.42s had been used on further fronts, including Iraq, the Eastern Front and the Italian mainland. Following the signing of the Italian armistice with the Allies on 8 September 1943, the type was relegated to use as a trainer by the Italian Co-Belligerent Air Force, while some Italian CR.42s were seized by the Germans and used by the Luftwaffe for ground-attack operations.

The CR.42 was produced and entered service in smaller numbers with the air forces of other nations, including Belgium, Sweden and Hungary. By the end of production, in excess of 1,800 CR.42s had been constructed, making it the most numerous Italian aircraft to be used during the Second World War. It has been claimed that the fighter had performed at its best during its service with the Hungarian Air Force, specifically during its deployment against Soviet forces on the Eastern Front of the war, where it reportedly achieved a kill to loss ratio of 12 to 1.

== Design and development ==
=== Origins ===
During the late 1930s, while a new generation of monoplane fighter aircraft was being introduced by the various air services of Europe, there was still a considerable time before they would be developed and available enough to assume total responsibility for strategic air power operations. By the outbreak of the Second World War during September 1939, many powers still fielded biplanes, such as the British Gloster Gladiator and the Italian CR.42. As such, even as the first flights of the latter were being conducted during 1939, despite an acknowledgement of its effective obsolescence, it was also recognised that such biplanes would find a use in plentiful second-line roles. This pragmatic observation turned out to be correct as not only would the CR.42 be built in greater numbers than any other Italian fighter of the war, it would also see action on every front in which the Regia Aeronautica fought upon.

The CR.42 was basically a development of the design of the earlier Fiat CR.32, which in turn had been derived from the CR.30 series created in 1932. During the Spanish Civil War of the mid-1930s, the Regia Aeronautica had employed the CR.32 and had reportedly accomplished significant successes using the fighter. The positive combat experience gave sufficient encouragement to the type's principal manufacturer, Fiat Aviazione, for the company to produce a proposal for the development of a more advanced derivative of the design, incorporating the newly finalised supercharged Fiat A.74R1C.38 air-cooled radial engine and several other enhancements. Key features of the fighter, which was designated as the CR.42, included its relatively clean aerodynamic exterior, a very strong structure, and a high level of maneuverability, a combination which had traditionally appealed to Italian pilots according to Cattaneo.

Both the proposal and the concept of a developed biplane was well received by the Regia Aeronautica, who placed a high value on the agility of the aircraft; confidence may have also been high due to the earlier wars in Ethiopia and Spain, both fought against relatively disorganised opposition, giving a deceptive impression of effectiveness. During its formal military evaluation, the prototype CR.42 was tested against the rival Caproni Ca.165 biplane fighter, and was judged to be superior, although the Ca.165 was a more modern design with a higher speed, albeit at the cost of maneuverability. During flight tests, it demonstrated a top speed of 438 km/h (272 mph) at 5,300 m (17,400 ft) and 342 km/h (213 mph) at ground level. Climb rate was 1 minute and 25 seconds to 1,000 m (3,300 ft) and of 7 minutes and 20 seconds to 6,000 m (20,000 ft).

During late 1939, by which time a major European war already seemed inevitable, the CR.42 was ordered for the Regia Aeronautica. as part of the R plan, under which Italy was to procure 3,000 new fighter aircraft, such as the monoplane Fiat G.50 and the Macchi C.200. At the outbreak of the Second World War, the CR.42 was considered to be the best biplane in service. Although the age of the biplane was noticeably already coming to a close by this point, a number of other foreign air forces expressed considerable interest in the new fighter. Once quantity production had been established, a number of early Falcos were delivered to foreign customers, even to the extent of re-directing aircraft originally intended for delivery to the Regia Aeronautica; these customers included Belgium, Hungary and Sweden.

=== Further development ===
Soon after its introduction to service, Fiat developed a number of variants of the type. The CR.42bis and CR.42ter featured increased firepower, while the CR.42CN was a dedicated night fighter model, the CR.42AS was optimised for performing ground attack missions, and the CR.42B Biposto commonly served in a twin-seat trainer role. Of these, the Biposto, which was furnished with a longer fuselage than other models to enable a second seat to be placed in tandem with the pilot, became the most extensively modified of all the CR.42 variants. Its length was increased by 68 centimeters over the standard fighter, to a total of 8.94 m; the height was 23 centimeters less. Empty weight was only 40 kilograms (88 lb) more, as the wheel fairings had been removed. Overall weight was 2,300 kg. Top speed was 430 km/h (270 mph) at 5,300 meters, only 8 km/h (5.0 mph) less. Up to 1945, a pair of machine guns were commonly fitted. About 40 aircraft were produced by Agusta and Caproni Trento.

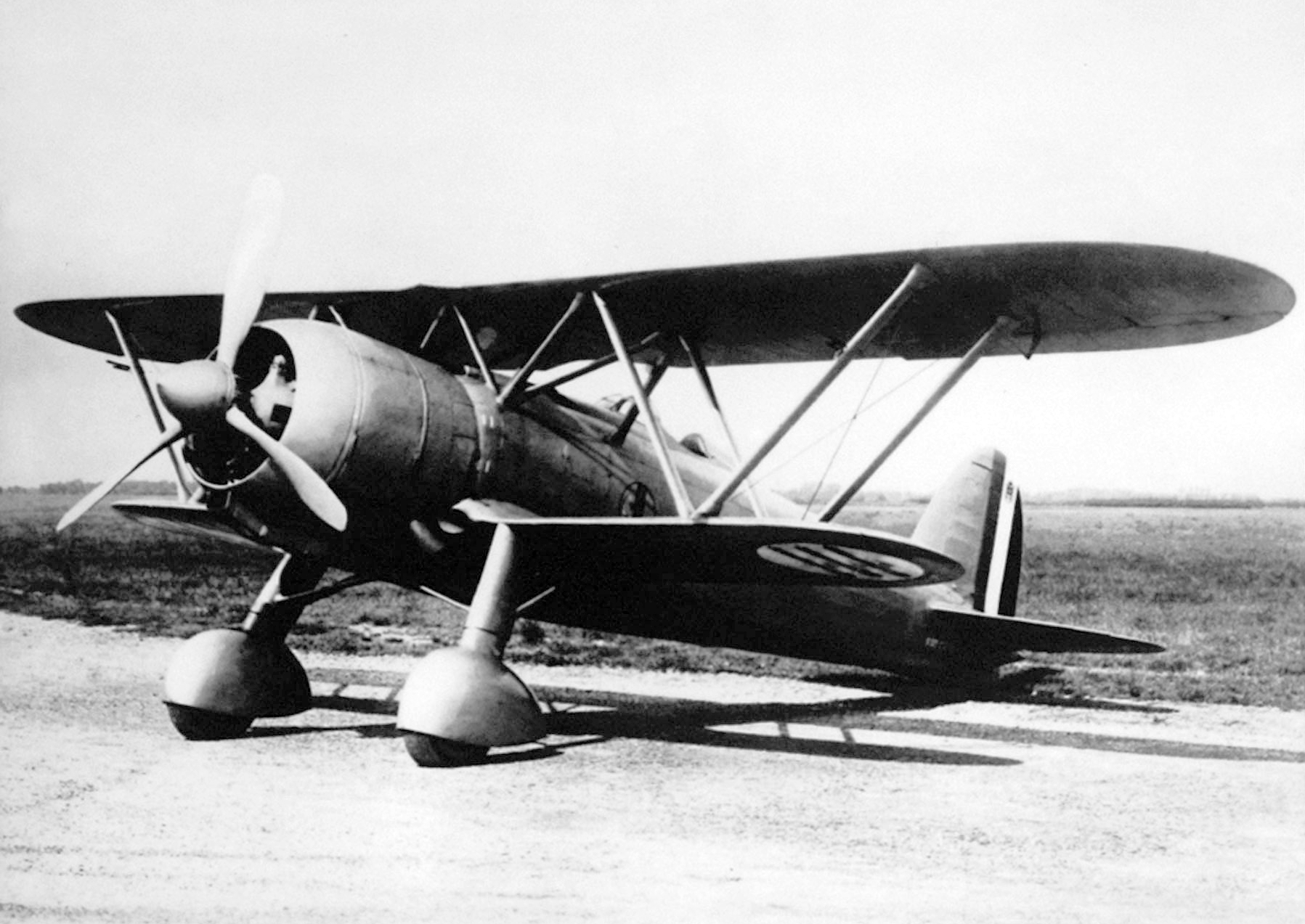
Fiat CR.42

In addition, various experimental configurations of the CR.42 was both studied and constructed for trial purposes. These included the I.CR.42 (Idrovolante= seaplane) and the re-engined CR.42DB. Beginning in 1938, Fiat had worked on the I.CR.42, then gave the task to complete the project to CMASA factory in Marina di Pisa on the Tirreno sea coast. The only prototype was built in 1940. Tests started at the beginning of 1941, at the Vigna di Valle base, on Lake Bracciano, north of Rome. Top speed was 423 km/h (263 mph), range was 950 kilometres (510 nautical miles; 590 miles) while ceiling was reduced to 9,000 m (30,000 ft). Empty weight went from 1,720 to 1,850 kilograms (3,790 to 4,080 lb), full weight from 2,295 to 2,425 kilograms (5,060 to 5,346 lb).

The CR.42DB was an attempt to improve performance by installing a Daimler-Benz DB 601 V12 engine of 753 kW (1,010 hp). This prototype, MM 469), was flown by test pilot Valentino Cus in March 1941, over Guidonia Montecelio, near Rome. During test flights it attained a top speed of 518 km/h (322 mph), ceiling of 10,600 metres (34,777 ft) and a range of 1,250 kilometres (780 mi). The project was cancelled as the biplane configuration did not offer any advantages over contemporary monoplane fighter designs. Although this variant never went into production, to the present day, the CR.42DB has continued to hold the distinction of being the fastest biplane to have ever flown.

Historians are still not certain exactly how many CR.42s were manufactured. The most likely estimate is thought to be 1,819 aircraft in total, including the 63 CR.42LWs (51 according to some sources) produced under Luftwaffe control, and a further 140 fighters that were produced for the various export customers for the type.

== Design ==
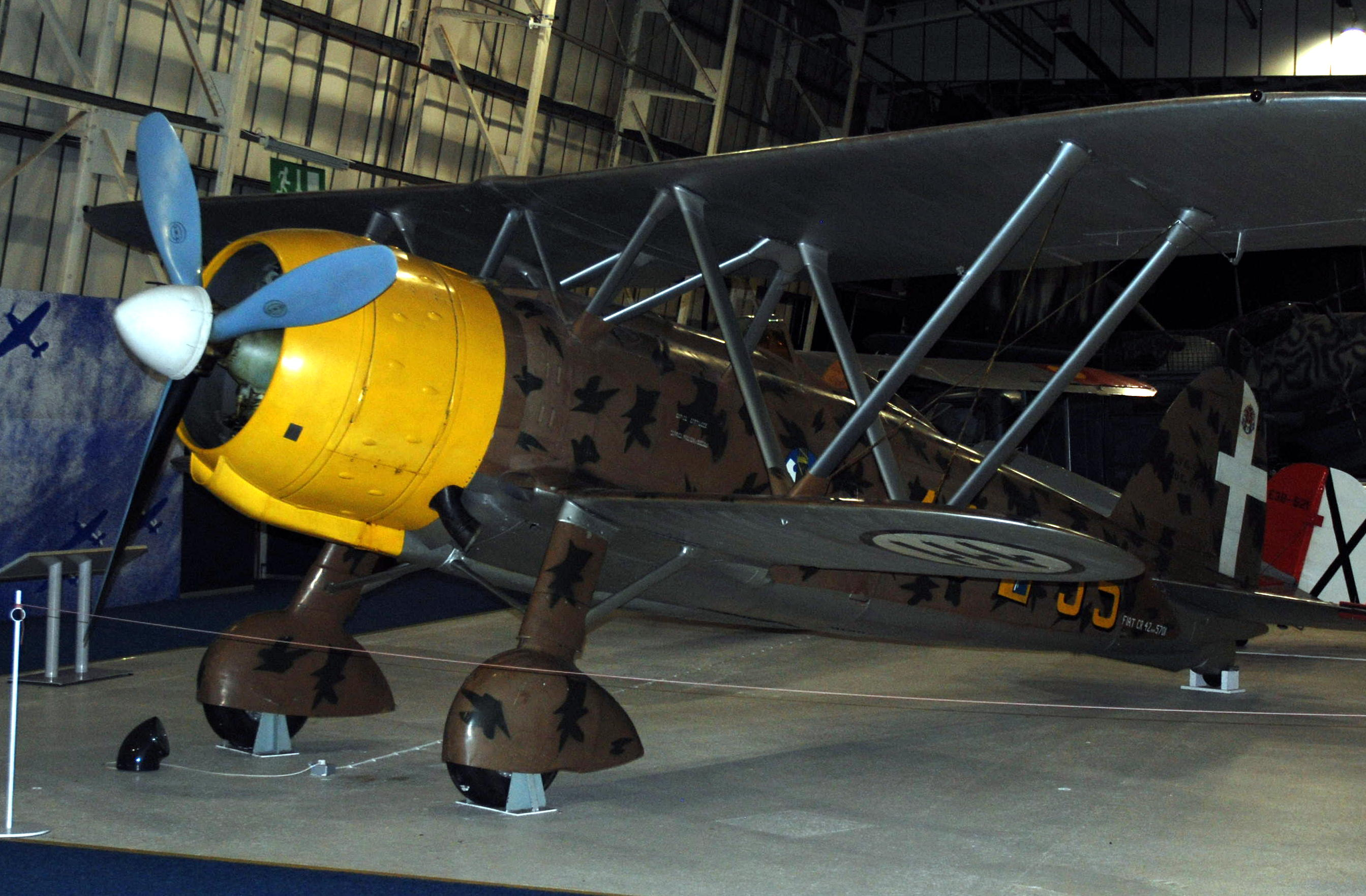
A preserved Fiat CR.42

The Fiat CR.42 was a robust and relatively clean single-seat biplane fighter aircraft; in spite of the biplane configuration of the aircraft, it was a modern, "sleek-looking" design, based around a strong steel and alloy structure. The CR.42 was furnished with fixed main landing gear, the legs of which were attached to the underside of the lower wing stubs; both legs' wheels were enclosed within streamlined fairings for aerodynamic reasons. The upper wing was larger than its lower wing, a configuration known as a sesquiplane. The aircraft proved to be exceptionally agile in flight, a characteristic which had been attributed to be a result of the fighter's very low wing loading. The very strong structure of the fighter enabled pilots to perform virtually all manoeuvres. Shortcomings of the CR.42 included its slower speed in comparison to monoplanes, and a lack of armour, firepower and radio equipment.

The CR.42 was typically powered by a single supercharged Fiat A.74R1C.38 geared air-cooled radial engine driving a metal three-blade Fiat-Hamilton Standard 3D.41-1 propeller of 2.9 metres (9 ft 6 in) diameter. During the aircraft's development, particular attention was paid to the design of the NACA cowling which accommodated the engine; the cowling had a series of adjustable flaps for cooling purposes. The engine bay incorporated a fire extinguisher. Early CR.42s were armed with a single 7.7 mm and one 12.7 mm Breda-SAFAT machine gun, which were installed in the decking of the upper fuselage and fired directly through the propeller. A counter for the rounds fired was present amongst the cockpit's instrumentation.

The fuselage of the CR.42 was a welded steel-tube triangulated framework built of light-alloy formers; the forward fuselage was covered by metal panelling, rear of the cockpit it was fabric covered. The wings used a structure that was constructed mainly of light duralumin alloys and steel; the leading edge was metal-skinned while the rest of the wing was fabric covered. The upper wing, which was the only one to have ailerons, was joined in the center and supported above the fuselage via an inverted V-shaped cabane, while the lower wings were directly attached onto the lower longerons of the fuselage. The tail unit was a cantilever, with a duralumin framework and fabric covering.

=== An Allied test pilot's opinion ===
Capt. Eric Brown, RN, Chief Naval Test Pilot and C.O. of the Captured Enemy Aircraft Flight, tested the Falco of Sergente Pietro Salvadori that had landed on Orfordness beach, on 11 November 1940. He reported the CR.42 was "remarkably fast" for a biplane, with a top speed of 270 mph (430 km/h) at 12,500 ft (3,800 m). The Falco had a "marginal stability which is the mark of a good fighter". Moreover, it was "brilliantly manoeuvrable, an acrobatic gem, but under-gunned and very vulnerable to enemy fire".

== Operational history ==
=== Regia Aeronautica ===
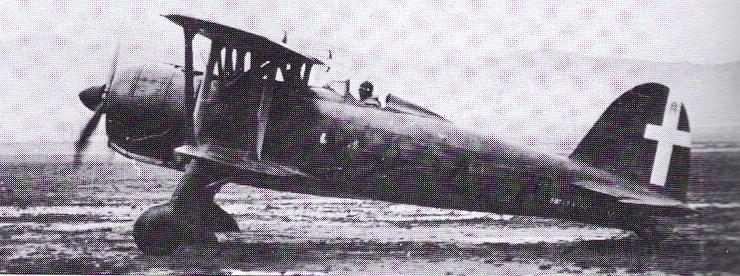
A Fiat CR.42 in Regia Aeronautica service.

During May 1939, the Fiat CR.42 entered operational service with the Regia Aeronautica; the 53° Stormo, based at Turin Caselle Airport, was the first unit to be equipped with the type. By 10 June 1940, the date on which Italy entered the Second World War on the side of Germany, roughly 300 aircraft had been delivered. Italy had delayed its entry into the war in order to better prepare itself for combat; through the period commonly known as the Phoney War, the Regia Aeronautica activated many new squadrons and did all that was possible to speed up aircraft deliveries, including of the CR.42. Accordingly, further orders for the type were placed as a part of this expansion effort.

Upon Italy's entry into the conflict, the Falchi were principally tasked with the defense of Italy's cities and military installations alike, such as Regia Aeronautica airbases and Regia Marina (Italian Royal Navy) bases. To some extent, the CR.42 continued to be used in this capacity right up until the signing of the Italian armistice with the Allies. By 8 September 1943, the day on which Italy formally surrendered to the Allies, only around 60 of these aircraft were still in a flyable condition. By the end of the CR.42's production during 1942, a total of 1,784 fighters had been constructed.

On numerous occasions, the Falco was engaged in dogfights against the British Gloster Gladiator, another biplane fighter, over Malta, and later against the British Hawker Hurricane monoplane, sometimes resulting in unexpected successes. The maneuverability of the Falco was an aspect of particular concern to the RAF pilots that faced them. Aviation author Haining observed that: "A RAF Intelligence report in late October 1940 circulated to all pilots and their squadrons, with copies to Prime Minister, Winston Churchill, and the War Cabinet, declared: 'The manoeuvrability of the CR.42s, in particular their capacity to execute an extremely tight half roll, has caused considerable surprise to other pilots and undoubtedly saved many Italian fighters from destruction.'"

==== Battle of France ====
On 13 June 1940, three days after entry of Italy into the war, 23 pilots from 23° Gruppo of 3° Stormo escorted a flight of ten Fiat BR.20 bombers to bomb the French naval base of Toulon. Later that day, they attacked French Air Force base of Hyères, in the Provence-Alpes-Côte d'Azur region in southeastern France, hitting approximately 50 enemy aircraft on the ground and destroying at least 20 of them. Italian pilots from 151° Gruppo claimed the shooting down of a French Vought V.156F. On the same day, a CR.42 from 82^{a} Squadriglia (13° Gruppo) took off to intercept a reconnaissance aircraft, but it failed to make contact and crashed during its landing, killing the pilot.

On 15 of June, 67 CR.42s from the same units, plus 18° Gruppo (from 3° Stormo), attacked the airfields of Southern France. 27 biplanes from 150° Gruppo strafed the airfield of Cuers-Pierrefeu, between Cuers and Pierrefeu-du-Var, with machine gun fire, causing around 15 V-156Fs to burst into flames. Seven of the Fiats giving top-cover were intercepted by Bloch MB.152s (Bloch MB.151s, according to other sources) from A.C.-3 that shot down a Falco and forced another to land. Italian pilots claimed four French fighters. Subsequently, Fiats attacked the airfields of Le Cannet-des-Maures and Puert Pierrefin, close to the border. This time the French fighter units reacted and the Fiats were attacked by Dewoitine 520s from G.C.III/6. Regia Aeronautica aviators claimed 8–10 air victories and many aircraft destroyed on the ground. Fiat pilots were credited with the downing of three Bloch and five Dewoitine fighters, in exchange for the loss of five Falchi.

Following the Fall of France, an Italian air group of CR.42s and BR.20 bombers operated from Belgium during October and November 1940. This task force flew some offensive operations during the later stages of the Battle of Britain, but incurred a high loss rate. Cattaneo speculated that the light losses experienced during the Battle of France had persuaded the Regia Aeronautica that the type was considerably more effective than it was against the modern frontline fighter aircraft that it would be coming up against, and thus had encouraged this brief deployment. In the present day, the RAF Museum at Hendon, London has a CR.42 on static display from this time; this aircraft had reportedly force-landed in Suffolk with a broken oil pipe, with the pilot surviving.

==== Malta ====
Over the skies of Malta, the CR.42 encountered British Hurricanes for the first time on 3 July 1940. That day, Flying Officer Waters (P2614) shot down an SM.79 bomber five miles (eight kilometers) off Kalafrana, but he was soon attacked in turn by the escorting Falchi, who badly shot up his aircraft. Waters crashed on landing and his Hurricane was written off. The Hurricane pilots soon discovered that the Italian biplanes could often outmaneuver their aircraft and that this was a crucial factor in any dogfight against them.

Pilot Officer Jock Barber remembered: "On my first combat, the 9 of July, I attacked the leader of a Squadriglia of Falcos, while [Flight Lieutenant] George Burges attacked an SM.79 bomber. When I shot the CR.42 at a range of 100 yards [91 meters], he did a flick-roll and went spinning down. I found myself engaged in dogfighting with the remaining CR.42s. This went down to about 10,000 feet [3,000 meters]; by then I had used up all my ammunition without much success, although I am convinced I got quite a few strikes on the leader in the initial combat. I realized pretty quickly that dogfighting with biplanes was just not on. They were so manoeuvrable that it was very difficult to get in a shot, and I had to keep diving and turning to keep myself from being shot down. George had by this time disappeared so I stuck my nose down and, with full throttle, was very thankful to get out of the way."

A week later, a dozen CR.42s from 23° Gruppo appeared in the sky over Malta for a reconnaissance. Flight Lieutenants Peter Keeble and Burges scrambled to intercept them, and the resulting action greatly impressed the Malta defenders with the CR.42's maneuvering capability. Keeble attacked one CR.42 – probably the aircraft (MM4368) flown by Sottotenente Mario Benedetti of 74^{a} Squadriglia that crashed, killing its pilot, but then came under attack himself by the Falchi of Tenente Mario Pinna and Tenente Oscar Abello. Keeble tried to dogfight with the Italians, but his engine was hit and his Hurricane dived into the ground at Wied-il-Ghajn, near Fort Rinella, and blew up; he was the first pilot to be killed in action at Malta. This was the first recorded air victory in the Second World War of the CR.42 against the Hurricane. Shortly after Keeble's loss, a meeting of all the pilots and senior staff was called to discuss the best ways of countering the agile CR.42. A suggestion was made that the Hurricane should put down a bit of flap as this might enable it to turn with the CR.42, but the only realistic proposal was to climb above these aircraft to be in an advantageous position. Nevertheless, Cattaneo noted that the Hurricane gradually proved itself to be superior to the CR.42.

==== Night fighter operations ====
As the war went on, the CR.42 had been superseded in the day fighter role by more advanced aircraft, but found a renewed niche performing night fighter missions. The Falco served as the main night fighter of the Regia Aeronautica, even though it was not equipped with radar and often lacked radio equipment. Some Falco night fighters were equipped with extended exhaust pipes to hide the exhaust flame. Additionally, 2 spotlights were fitted under the wings of some of the night fighters. The first night interception was performed over the night of 13–14 August 1940 by Capitano Giorgio Graffer, when he located and opened fire on a British Armstrong Whitworth Whitley bomber that had been sent to attack Turin. When his guns jammed, Graffer rammed the bomber before bailing out. The bomber had been badly damaged and subsequently crashed into the English Channel whilst attempting to return to its base.

One of the most successful night interceptions took place on the night of 25 August 1942. That day, in an attempt to oppose RAF night intruder missions that were hammering Italian airfields, the 4° Stormo borrowed four radio-equipped CR.42s, from 208^{a} and 238^{a} Squadriglie of the 101° Gruppo Bombardamento a Tuffo, based at Abar Nimeir, to use them as night interceptors. According to Cattaneo, the CR.42 achieved a degree of success as a night fighter, proving itself to be effective against RAF bombers that were bombing industrial targets throughout northern Italy during 1942.

==== Corpo Aereo Italiano ====
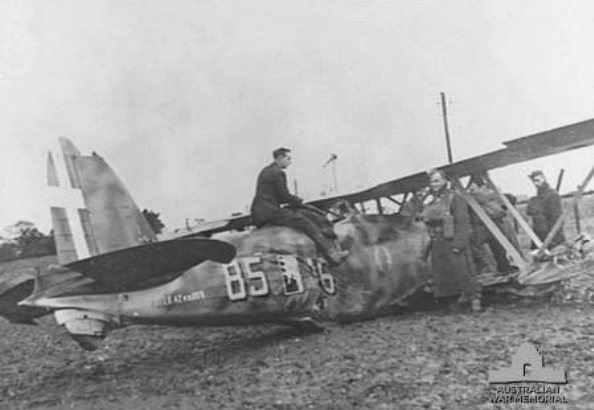
CR.42 fighter of 18° Gruppo, 56° Stormo after crash-landing near Lowestoft, Suffolk on 11 November 1940. The pilot successfully evaded three British Hurricanes, but was forced down by a malfunction of his aircraft's variable-pitch propeller

In autumn 1940, Regia Aeronautica sent 18° Gruppo (of 56° Stormo) in Belgium with 83^{a}, 85^{a} and 95^{a} Squadriglia equipped with CR.42s as part of the Corpo Aereo Italiano, an independent air corps for operations against Great Britain. On 11 and 23 November 1940, multiple CR.42s flew two raids against England. Luftwaffe aircraft frequently experienced difficulties in maintaining formation flight with the slower biplanes. Even though slower, with an open cockpit, many units lacking radio, and armed with only a pair of machine guns (a pair of 12.7 mm/.5 in or a combination of former and a 7.7 mm/.303 in Breda-SAFAT), the Falchi could easily outturn the Hurricanes and the Spitfires opposing it and usually proved difficult to hit. "The CR 42 turned to fight using all the aeroplane's manoeuvrability. The pilot could get on my tail in a single turn, so tightly was he able to pull round." As the RAF intelligence report stated, the Falchi were hard targets. "As I fired he half rolled very tightly and I was completely unable to hold him, so rapid were his manoeuvres. I attacked two or three more and fired short bursts, in each case the enemy aircraft half-rolled very tightly and easily and completely out-turned me. In two cases as they came out of their rolls, they were able to turn in almost on my tail and opened fire on me."

Against British monoplanes, the CR.42s were not always outclassed; one Italian pilot's account is as follows: "I engaged one of the British fighters from a range of between 40 to 50 metres (131 to 164 ft). Then I saw a Spitfire, which was chasing another CR.42, and I got in a shot at a range of 150 metres (492 ft). I realised that in a manoeuvered flight, the CR.42 could win or survive against Hurricanes and Spitfires, though we had to be careful of a sweep from behind. In my opinion, the English .303 bullet was not very effective. Italian aircraft received many hits which did no material damage and one pilot even found that his parachute pack had stopped a bullet." During the winter of 1940/1941, the CR.42s were transferred back to the Mediterranean theatre.

==== East Africa ====
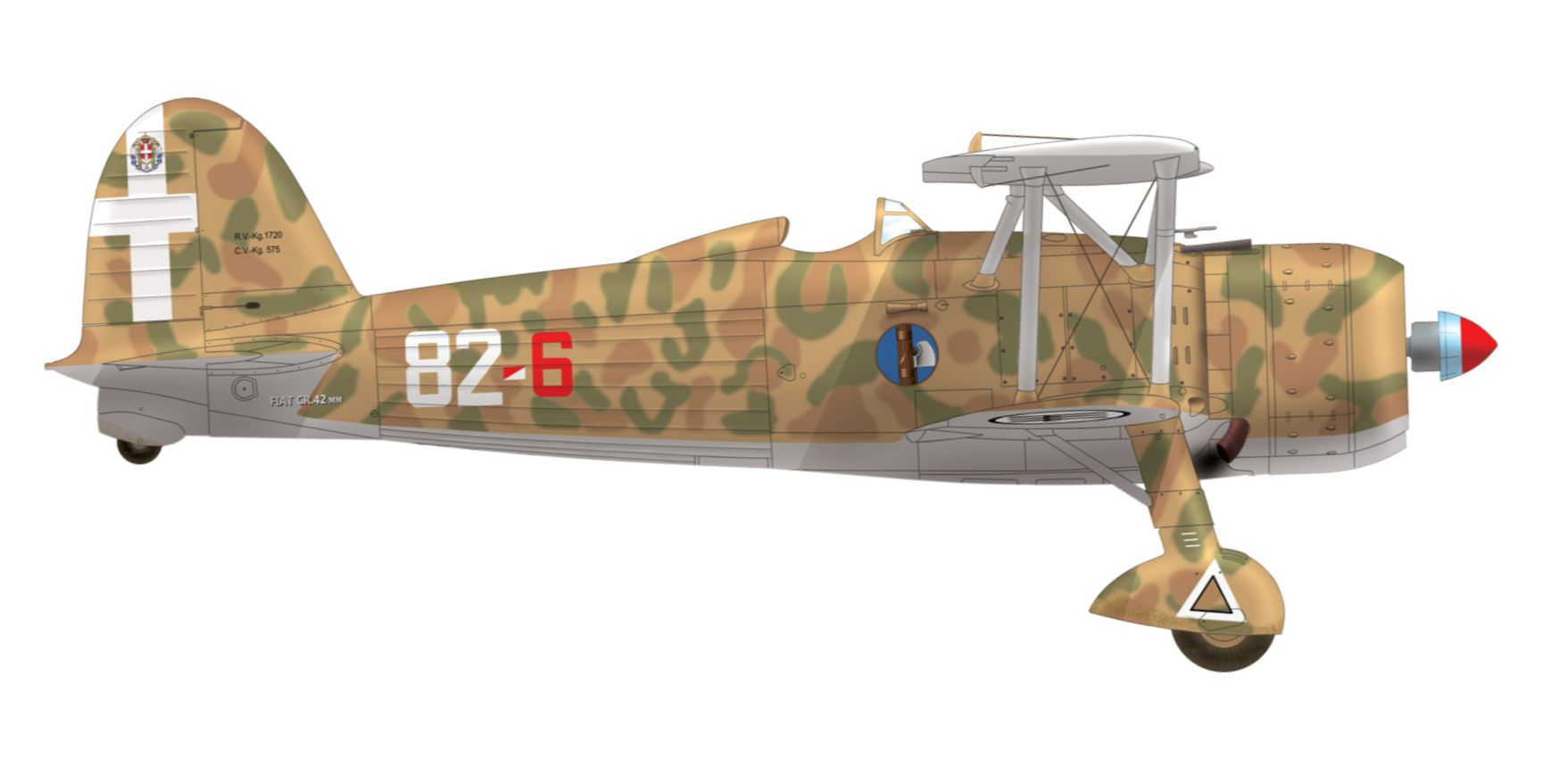
A CR.42, 82a Squadriglia 13° Gruppo 2° Stormo. C. T., Gambut airfield, September 1940

While flying the Falco in Africa Orientale Italiana (A.O.I), Mario Visintini became the top biplane fighter ace of the Second World War (having achieved 16 kills) and Luigi Baron and Aroldo Soffritti became the second and third Fiat CR. 42 top scoring aces, having made 12 and 8 air victories respectively. Moreover, during that short and difficult campaign, the Fiat fighters were responsible for the destruction of a large number of RAF and South African Air Force (SAAF) aircraft, both in the air and on the ground, including a number of Hurricanes.

During 1940, three squadriglie stationed in Italian East Africa — Ethiopia, Italian Eritrea, and Italian Somaliland — were equipped with CR.42s. The 412^{a} – the most experienced Squadriglia – was based in Gura (with the 414^{a} Squadriglia) and in Massawa. The 413^{a} Squadriglia was in Assab. Fighting there began in June 1940 and lasted until the autumn of 1941. The Italians met mostly British bombers and reconnaissance aircraft, destroying many of them. On 12 June 1940, 412^{a} Squadriglia attacked nine Vickers Wellesley bombers from 47 Squadron above Asmara, and Tenente Carlo Canella claimed the first CR.42 victory in East Africa, a Wellesley that was heavily damaged and forced to crash-land. Two days later, the 412^{a} Squadriglia again intercepted a pair of Wellesleys, this time from 14 Squadron, that were trying to bomb Massawa. Tenente Mario Visintini, for the first of his 16 air victories in East Africa, shot down the Wellesley flown by Pilot Officer Plunkett.

Dogfights usually occurred when enemy airfields were being attacked. But fierce air battles took place at the beginning of November 1940, during the British offensive against the Italian forts of Gallabat and Metemma, along the Sudan border. The Regia Aeronautica was dominant in these fights, sometimes even against more powerful opponents. The most successful day was on 6 November when the CR.42s achieved seven confirmed victories against the Gladiators, for no losses. In the air duels fought during 1940, losses however were also suffered: at least six Fiats were destroyed and about a dozen damaged. Operations involving the CR.42 were typically hampered by wider logistical issues; the Royal Navy had prevented Italian supplies reaching East Africa and aerial transportation alone proved to be insufficient.

==== North Africa ====
It was on the North African front that the CR.42 was most extensively used. At the beginning of the war in Italian North Africa, there were 127 CR.42s from the 13° Gruppo (2° Stormo) at Castel Benito and from the 10° and 9° Gruppo of 4° Stormo in Benina, including reserve aircraft. According to some historians, it was in the North African theatre that the CR.42 performed at its best. Experienced Italian pilots, the majority of them being veterans of the Spanish Civil War, employed the exceptional manoeuvrability of the CR.42 to great effect, enabling successful attacks against RAF Gladiators, Hurricanes and Spitfires and often forcing their opponents "...to adopt the tactic that Messerschmitt pilots had used against them: to avoid dogfights and to attack them with sudden dives."

Initially, the Falco was pitted against the contemporary Gloster Gladiator and Hawker Hart (the latter being operated by the South African Air Force) biplanes, as well as the Bristol Blenheim fast bombers of the RAF, opposing which they were able to achieve a measurable level of success. On 29 June, a group of CR.42s from 2° Stormo scrambled to intercept an inbound formation of Blenheims, estimated as totalling nine aircraft, that were in the process of bombing the airfield of Tobruk T2. During the ensuing engagement, the Italian pilots claimed to have shot down six of the British bombers, probably from No.113 Squadron, which that day reported as having lost three aircraft.

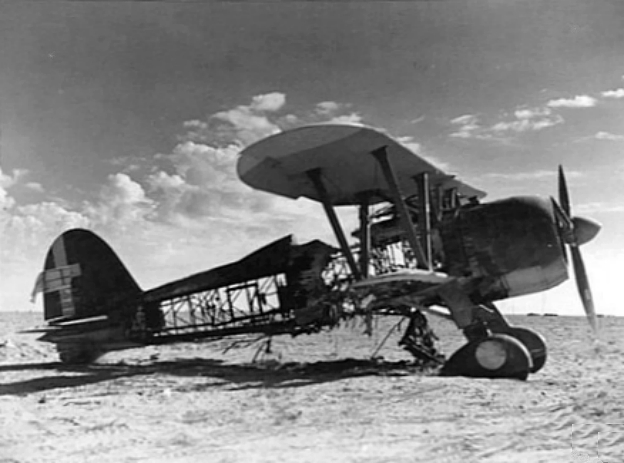
A wrecked CR.42 at Bardia, 1940

On 8 August 1940, in an aerial duel between comparable rivals, a flight of 16 CR.42s from 9° and 10° Gruppi of 4° Stormo were "bounced" by 14 Gladiators of No.80 Squadron RAF over Gabr Sàleh (about 65 km (40 mi) southeast of El Adem and 35 km (22 mi) east of Bir El Gubi). Four of the CR.42s were shot down while four more were force-landed and later recovered. In return, the Italian pilots claimed to have downed five Gladiators in the dogfight (three shared amongst the pilots of 10° Gruppo and two shared by the 73^{a} Squadriglia pilots) along with two probables (the 90^{a} Squadriglia’s Diary reported six victories), with two Gladiators actually lost (one pilot for each side was killed in action), but the combat was a nasty day for the best unit fielded in North Africa. 4° Stormo was the mainstay of Italian fighter force in Africa, and its 73^{a} Squadriglia was the best unit, yet that day lost five CR.42s (including the ones eventually recovered). That air combat highlighted the advantages of the Gladiator over the CR.42, especially radio equipment that could permit coordinated attacks, and the Gladiator's superior low altitude overall performance, with a markedly superior horizontal manoeuvrability over the Falchi.

The Gladiator was viewed as being superior to the Fiat in regards to its combat equipment also. The 12.7 mm Breda-SAFAT could fire an effective explosive bullet, but the Gladiator's Brownings were able to shoot 2.5 more rounds per second than the synchronized Italian machine guns. However, the CR.42 was capable of superior performance; it was much faster at about 3,000 feet (900 m) thanks to its smaller wing area, constant-speed propeller and the superior power of its engine, which could provide up to 960 horsepower (720 kW) for short periods at emergency rating. The overall exchange ratio between CR.42 and Gladiator is difficult to assess, but Håkan Gustavsson and Slongo rated the Gladiator with an advantage about 1.2–1.9:1.

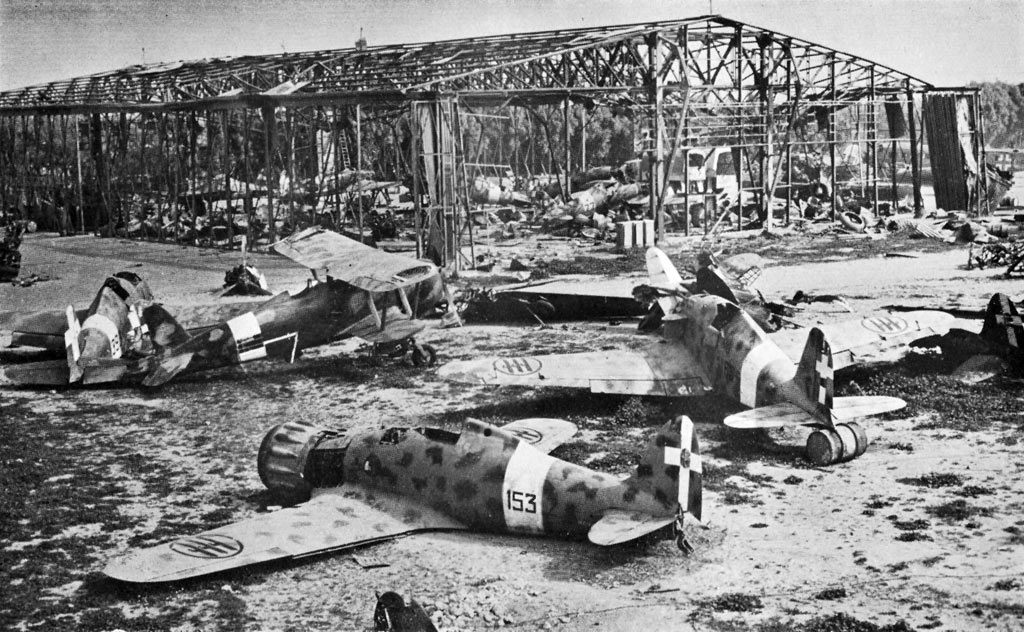
Wrecked fighters in a destroyed hangar at Tripoli-Castel Benito Airport, Tripoli, Libya, early 1943

Eventually, on 31 October 1940, the Falchi scored their first confirmed air victories in North Africa against the Hawker Hurricane. During the air battle over Mersa Matruh Sergente Maggiore Davide Colauzzi and Sergente Mario Turchi from 368^{a} Squadriglia, while escorting SM.79 bombers, shot down the Hurricanes of 33 Squadron that were flown by 26-year-old Canadian Flying Officer Edmond Kidder Leveille (RAF no. 40837) – who was forced to bail out but was killed when his parachute failed to deploy completely – and Flying Officer Perry St Quintin (Hurricane P3724), who made a forced landing at Qasaba with a holed fuel tank.

Notwithstanding these successes, it became increasingly evident that the Fiat CR.42 was unable to operate effectively against the more modern monoplanes of which increasingly larger numbers were being fielded. Over time, the type was able to rely only on its considerable manoeuvrability and Regia Aeronautica piloting skills as potential advantages against its opposition. Italian losses were, however, stemmed when the more advanced Macchi C.200 and the Messerschmitt Bf 109 and Messerschmitt Bf 110 of Luftflotte 4, arrived in the theatre during April 1941. The CR.42s were progressively relegated to performing ground-attack operations instead, leaving interception duties to the more capable monoplanes.

==== Greece ====
The Fiat CR.42 was the main Regia Aeronautica front-line fighter when the Greco-Italian War broke out during late 1940. Sixty-four Falcos (out of 179 fighters) were deployed at air bases in Albania: in Drenovë (Korçë), with 160° Gruppo and in Tirana, with 363^{a}, 364^{a} and 365^{a} Squadriglie of 24° Gruppo. In Greece, on the whole, the fighting was fairly difficult for the Falco pilots, despite an overinflated claim to have achieved a ratio kill/losses of 5.6 to 1. The Regia Aeronautica coped with Royal Hellenic Air Force's (RHAF) obsolete reconnaissance aircraft, such as the Breguet Br.19, without any problems, but had significant difficulties dealing with the Greek fighters such as the PZL P.24, the Bloch MB.151s and the Gloster Gladiator; the Italians suffering losses at a higher rate than they were achieving themselves, losing over 68 aircraft and shooting down just 20 in return. Two days after the start of the war, on 30 October, there was the first air battle. Some Henschel Hs126s of 3/2 Flight of 3 Observation Mira took off to locate Italian Army columns. But they were intercepted and attacked by Fiat CR.42s of 393^{a} Squadriglia. A first Henschel was hit and crashed, killing its observer, Pilot Officer Evanghelos Giannaris, the first Greek aviator to die in the war. A second Hs 126 was downed over Mount Smolikas, killing Pilot Officer Lazaros Papamichail and Sergeant Constantine Yemenetzis. The first CR.42 victories were credited to Fernando Zanni and Walter Ratticchieri. On 4 November 1940, three CR.42s jumped three RHAF Breguet from 2 Mira, sent to attack the 3rd Julia Alpine Division retreating from a mountain pass near Metsovo. A Breguet was shot down, one crash-landed and the third returned to base, though badly shot up.

At the beginning of November, the Greeks received support by the Royal Air Force and on 4 November six Vickers Wellingtons from 70 Squadron attacked Valona. CR.42s pilots shot down two British bombers and damaged two more. Fortunes started to reverse, on 18 November, the first day of Greek army counter-attack. While a CR.42 shot down a Greek Bristol Blenheim, during a dogfight with Greek fighters, 393^{a} Squadriglia damaged four PZL P.24s but lost three Fiats. On the same day, a flight of 20 Gladiators from RAF 80 Squadron landed in Athens. While deployed in North Africa, the CR.42 pilots had been able to achieve a clear superiority over the Gladiators but in Greece, they suffered more heavy losses. The superiority of the Gloster was achieved in part as a result of its enclosed cockpit, which was an advantage when operating in the cold winter sky, while the R/T radio allowed for the adoption of more effective tactics that made it possible to ambush the Italian CR.42 formations, as well as the superior skill of the British aces of 80 Squadron, commanded by Marmaduke Pattle. The majority of the Italian pilots shot down and killed in Greece were new arrivals, fresh from flying schools; these pilots frequently insisted on direct engagements against the more manoeuvrable British biplanes, leading to unfavourable dogfights. In the Greco-Italian War, CR.42 pilots claimed 162 kills, for the loss of 29 aircraft. By July 1943, CR.42s still equipped 383^{a} Squadriglia Assalto (Ground Attack Squadron) based in Zara and in September 1943, 392^{a} (in Tirana) and 385^{a} Squadriglie Autonome.

==== Iraq ====
During April 1941, Rashid Ali led a pro-Axis coup in Iraq. In response, British Army units began moving into the area to quell the rebellion, many of which made landfall near Basra. Germany and Italy dispatched support to Ali's forces in the form of Messerschmitt Bf 110s, Savoia-Marchetti SM.79s and CR.42s, which were quickly put into action against the British. The Regia Aeronautica sent 155^{a} Squadriglia (named Squadriglia speciale Irak) equipped with the improved CR.42 Egeo version, which was furnished with a radio set and a 100-litre auxiliary tank, the latter of which increased the fighter's operational range (typically 800 km (500 mi) at 380 km/h (240 mph)) up to 1,100 km (680 mi) at economical speed. In Iraq, the Regia Aeronautica was only operational for four days (28–31 May 1941), during which their aircraft were reportedly painted in Iraqi colours.

On 22 May 1941, a flight of CR.42s took off from Alghero and flew up to 900 km (560 mi) to Valona (one of which crashed on landing), Rhodes, Aleppo and Mosul. A total of 11 Fiat biplanes flew together with a single SM.79 and a SM.81, which served as "pathfinders" and transport aircraft, while a further three SM.82s transported weapons for the campaign. On 23 May, the Italian aircraft arrived in Iraq. Six days later(on 28 May according to other sources), the CR.42s, in what was to prove the final air-to-air combat of the brief campaign, intercepted and engaged a formation of RAF Blenheims, (Note: According to other historians, a flight of Hawker Audax light bombers were intercepted during this final engagement, rather than Blenheim medium bombers.) claiming two No. 94 Squadron Gladiators, with the loss of one CR.42 shot down by a Gladiator flown by Wg Cdr Wightman, close to Khan Nuqta. Three of the CR.42s were damaged during combat and were subsequently abandoned in Iraq. The seven survivors of the engagement were withdrawn with great difficulty, since the SM.79 "pathfinder" had been destroyed on the ground by the RAF, despite being located further away at Aleppo airfield, Syria. The Axis effort to reinforce the Iraqi insurgents was insufficient and the coup had quickly been put down; however, this contributed to the decision to invade Syria that resulted in a substantial diversion during an already critical moment for the Allies. While retreating, 164^{a} Squadriglia CR.42s were used to defend Pantelleria.

=== Royal Hungarian Air Force ===
The first foreign purchaser of the CR.42 was the Royal Hungarian Air Force (MKHL), which placed orders for 52 aircraft during mid-1938. The Hungarians, while aware that the CR.42 was conceptually outdated in comparison to the newer generation of monoplanes, had considered the rapid re-equipment of their fighter component to be of vital importance. Additionally, the Italian government had expressed its willingness to forgo CR.42 delivery positions in order to expedite the re-equipment of the Hungarian units. By the end of 1939, a total of 17 CR.42s had been delivered to Hungary, where they were promptly issued to 1. Vadász Ezred (1st Fighter Wing), which began conversion from the earlier CR.32. Its two groups of two squadrons, 1./I Vadász Osztály (Fighter Group) at Szolnok and the 1./II Vadász Osztály at Mátyásföld, Budapest, received their full complement of fighters during mid-1940.

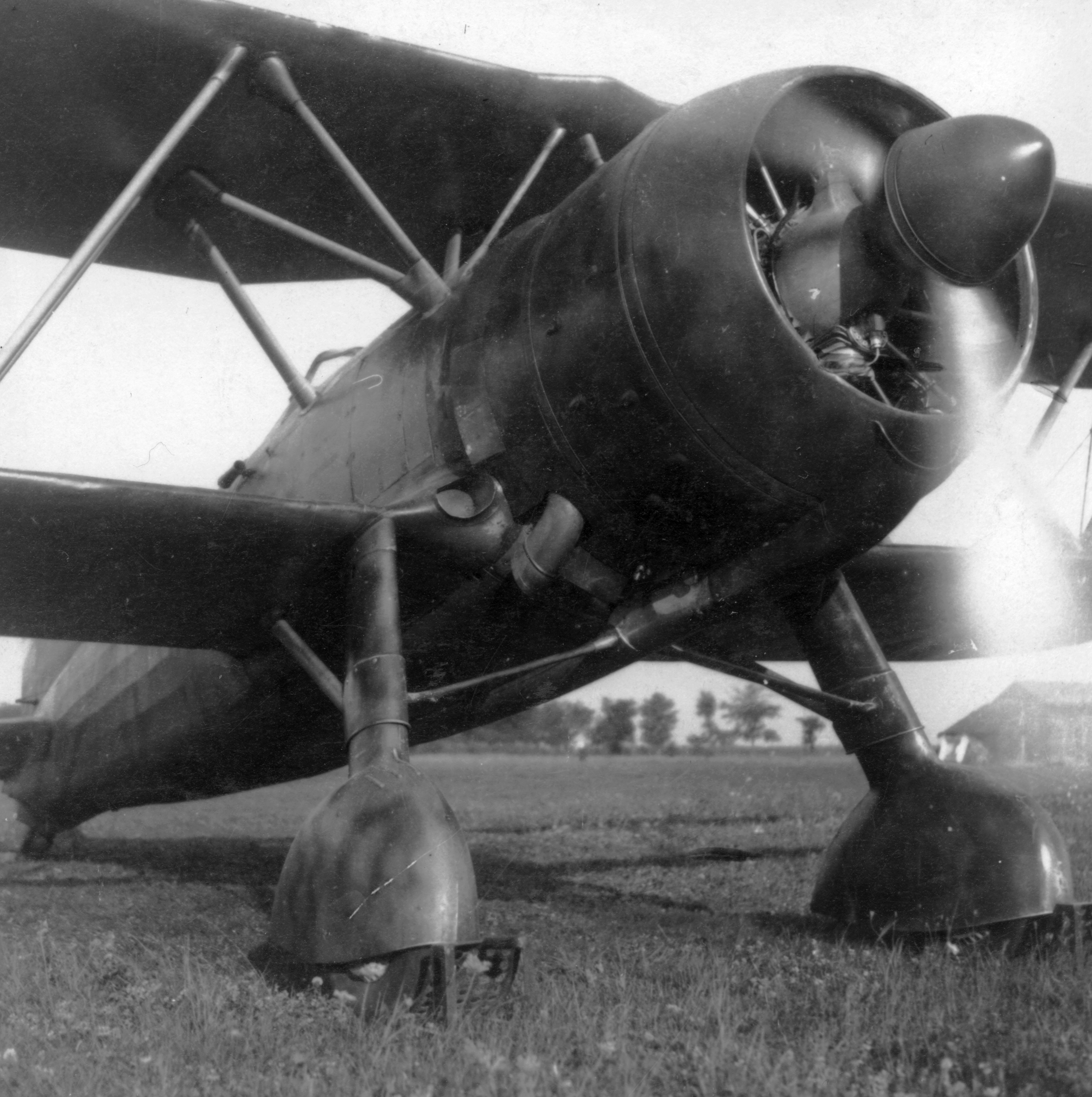
A Hungarian CR.42 in 1943

Some of the CR.42s in Hungarian service were armed with a single 12.7 mm (0.50 in) Gebauer GKM Machine Gun 1940.M (Gebauer Kenyszermeghajtasu Motorgeppuska, or "Gebauer Positive-Driven Motor-Machine Gun"); these were fixed twin-barrel guns that were driven via the crankshaft of the aircraft's engine. In total, the MKHL ordered 70 CR.42s but, through a barter which included the exchange of a captured Yugoslavian Savoia-Marchetti SM.79, they received an additional two CR.42s during 1941. The Hungarian CR.42s were first used in combat against neighbouring Yugoslavia during April 1941. During the short conflict in the Balkans, the MKHL reportedly lost two of their CR.42s.

In mid-June, CR.42 fighters equipped several MKHL units: 1/3.'Kör ász'F.S. and 1/4. 'Szent György' F.S. both based in Budapest-Mátyásföld; 2/3. 'Ricsi' F.S. (in Bustyaháza) and 2/4. 'Repülö tör' F.S. (in Miskolc). On 27 June 1941, Hungary declared war on the Soviet Union and, on that same day, Hungarian CR.42s received their baptism of fire when 2/3. Squadron escorted bomber formations against Stanislau, today Ivano-Frankivsk, in Ukraine. Ensign László Kázár was hit by Soviet anti-aircraft fire while strafing, leading to his crash landing behind enemy lines. On the same day, Sergeant Árpád Kertész, from the same unit, claimed the first victory, shooting down a Soviet reconnaissance plane. The 2/3. Squadron flew many sorties until the middle of July escorting bombers and strafing enemy airfields. They claimed six additional kills, losing a single aircraft on 12 July, when 2nd Lieutenant Gyõzõ Vámos collided in a dogfight with a Polikarpov I-16 and bailed out, surviving. On 11 August, Hungarian Fiats escorted six Caproni Ca.135s, commanded by Sen Lt Szakonyi, on their way to bomb a 2 km (1.2 mi) bridge across the Southern Bug River in the city of Nikolayev, on the Black Sea. On the way back the Capronis were intercepted by a flight of Soviet Polikarpov I-16 fighters. The escorting Hungarian CR.42s shot down five I-16s while sustaining no losses amongst their own. After the German 11th Army captured Nikolayev on 16 August, the commander of Luftflotte 4, Col Gen Lohr, decorated the successful Hungarian crews at Sutyska.

The Hungarian CR.42s were later used in the ground attack role against Soviet forces until December 1941. Although typically outclassed by more modern types, the Hungarian CR.42s scored 25 destroyed, one probable, one damaged (according to other sources they claimed 24 plus two Soviet planes in the air) and one aircraft destroyed on the ground, losing two planes to Soviet fighters. For a time, the surviving CR.42s were relegated to training roles. During spring 1944, a night assault CR.42 Squadron was formed. These aircraft were equipped with flame dampers and bomb racks for the carriage of four 50 kg bombs; however, these planes were reportedly not used operationally. The majority of Hungary's CR.42s were lost in training accidents and strafing attacks by U.S. aircraft during 1944. It is believed that a single Hungarian Falco survived the war.

=== Belgian Air Force ===
During 1939, a mission from the Belgian Air Force purchased a batch of 40 CR.42s for a total price of 40 million francs. On 6 March 1940, the first of these arrived in Belgium but was destroyed in a landing accident. The CR.42s were mainly delivered to the Evere Établissements Généraux de l'Aéronautique Militaire, which were responsible for their assembly. The first operational squadron, IIème Group de Chasse (Fighter Group) based at Nivelles, received its full complement of 15 while other units still awaited further deliveries. The exact quantity of CR.42s delivered to Belgium prior to the German attack on 10 May 1940 has been estimated by historians to fall between 24 and 27 aircraft, the last of which having been transported to France and lost in the railway station at Amiens. However, photographic evidence suggests that the total number of CR.42s delivered was 30. On 9 May, squadrons operating the Falchi were the 3rd "Cocotte rouge", with 14, and the 4th, "Cocotte Blanche", with 11 aircraft. In addition to those, the planes of Major Lamarche and two others (R.21 and R.27) in a hangar at Nivelles were not serviceable, while another was at Airfield Number 41 with mechanical trouble.

The Fiat CR.42s were first to be blooded in Belgium; after their initial encounters with the vastly superior Messerschmitt Bf 109 fighters of the Luftwaffe, the entire contingent of Fiats was quickly overwhelmed, although the Belgian pilots fought with great skill. The Belgian CR.42s fought from the first day of the invasion, when they attacked a formation of attacking Ju 52s (from 17/KGzbV 5) in the Tongeren area, forcing one to crash-land near Maastricht. The Fiats were then jumped by the escorting Bf 109s from I./JG.1 but, thanks to their superior agility, managed to safely return to base. That day, the Belgian pilots claimed to have downed a further four German aircraft: three Do 17 bombers and a single Bf 109, while the Stukas of I./St.2 destroyed no less than 14 CR.42s at Brustem airfield.

In a total of 35 missions flown, the CR.42s downed at least five and probably even eight enemy aircraft including a Dornier Do 17, Junkers Ju 52 and the vaunted Bf 109 for a loss of two of their own. The only two confirmed Bf 109E losses were scored by Charles Goffin. After capitulation, the five surviving Fiat CR.42s were brought into a French Air Force depot in Fréjorques, where they were later found by the Germans. Their final fate is not known. Overall, the total claims made by Belgian CR.42 pilots were: eight Do 17, four Bf 109 and a single Ju 52.

=== Swedish Air Force ===
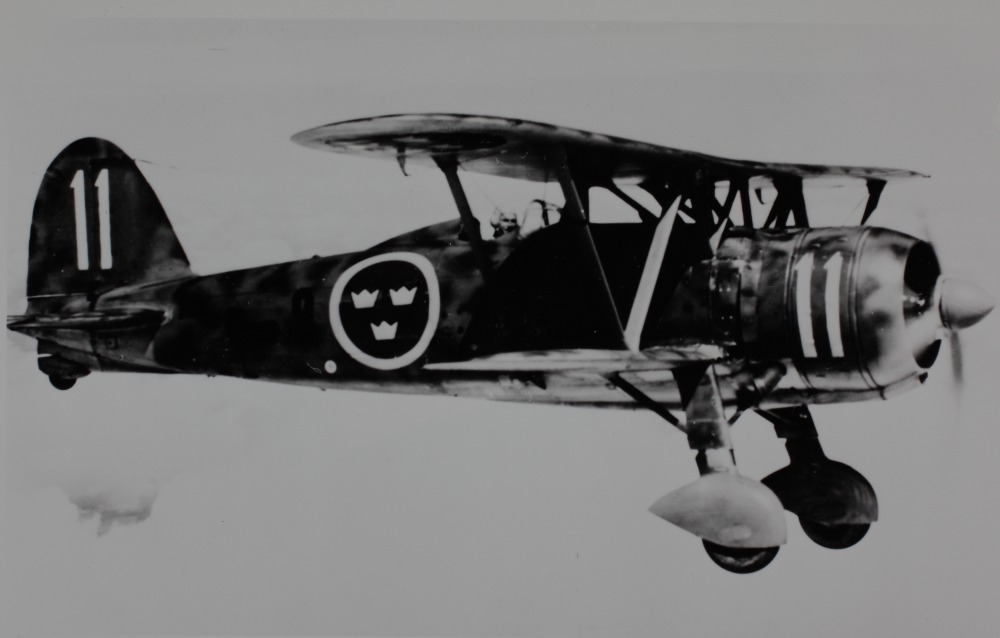
A Swedish Air Force CR.42 (J 11)

Sweden was the largest export customer for the CR.42. The Swedish Air Force purchased various types of Italian combat aircraft during 1939–1941, as an emergency measure enacted in response to the outbreak of the Second World War. As a consequence of the war, no other nations were willing to supply fighter aircraft to a small neutral country, while Sweden's domestic production would be insufficient until at least 1943. Between February 1940 and September 1941, Sweden received a total of 72 CR.42s; these fighters were equipped with radio sets, 20-millimetre (0.79 in) armour plate behind the pilot and ski landing gear for winter operations. The Swedish aircraft were designated J 11.

The J 11s were initially assigned to the F 9 wing, responsible for the air defence of Gothenburg, but were transferred to the newly established Bråvalla Wing (F 13) in Norrköping in 1943 when F 9 received more advanced J 22 fighters. The J 11s operating from Kiruna, in the north of Sweden, were equipped with a ski undercarriage. During the spring of 1942, the J 11s of 1. Division were transferred to Luleå airfield. The J 11s scrambled several times to intercept German aircraft that violated Sweden's borders, but usually failed to make contact with intruders. The J 11s of 2. and 3. Divisions based in Gothenburg managed to intercept intruders a few times, forcing them to leave Swedish airspace.

During their service in Swedish Air Force, the CR.42 suffered many accidents, sometimes because of the poor quality of materials that had been used by the Fiat factory. By the end of 1942, eight fighters had been lost, while 17 more had followed by the end of 1943. In total, in excess of 30 CR.42s were lost due to accidents and mechanical failure. Swedish pilots appreciated the J 11's formidable close-in dogfighting abilities; however, they would often complain about the type's low speed, insufficient armament and the open cockpits that were unsuited for the severe climate of Scandinavia. By 1945, the Swedish CR.42s were considered to be obsolete.

By 14 March 1945, the remaining J 11s of the F 13 wing were decommissioned for good by the Swedish Air Force. A total of 19 aircraft were sold to a civilian contractor, Svensk Flygtjänst AB, who used 13 of them as target tugs for at least one season, although the type was not well suited for the role. Another six J 11s were delivered to Svensk Flygtjänst AB as a source for spare parts. Secondhand aircraft were given Swedish civil registrations. The last J 11 was removed from the register during 1949. A single surviving Swedish "Falco" was preserved. It was stored at the F 3 wing; the aircraft had been deliberately "hidden away" with the intent of it being displayed in a future museum. Number NC.2453, marked as 9 9, is today on permanent static display in the Swedish Air Force Museum (Flygvapenmuseum) in Linköping.

=== Luftwaffe ===
Shortly following the announcement of the Italian armistice of 1943, the Luftwaffe took over the majority of Regia Aeronautica aircraft. Among these aircraft were a number of CR.42s. German Rüstungs-und-Kriegsproduktion Stab took control of Italy's northern aircraft industry; consequently, an order for 200 CR.42LW (LW=Luftwaffe) was placed with Fiat for use by the Luftwaffe. In German service, the type was used to conduct nighttime harassment operations and anti-partisan roles. A number of the captured Fiats were allocated to training divisions as well. The CR.42 was nicknamed "Die Pressluftorgel" or "the Pneumatic Organ" by Luftwaffe trainee pilots, presumably because of its profusion of pneumatic systems.

One of the German units to use the CR.42 was Nachtschlachtgruppe (NSGr.) 9, based in Udine. It was tasked with fighting against partisans in the region of the Alps, Istria and Croatia. During November 1943, the 1. Staffel received its Falchi and, in January 1944, the unit was transferred to the airfield at Caselle, near Turin, to operate against partisan units in the vicinity of the Southern Alps. On 28 January, the 2. Staffel was also equipped with the CR.42. The training of German pilots took place at a school in Venaria Reale.

During February 1944, after news of the Allies' landing at Anzio, 1.Staffel and 2.Staffel, based at Centocelle Airport in Rome, attacked Allied units in southern Latium, which were conducted mostly during moonlit night raids. NSGr9 attacked enemy troops in the Monte Cassino area. The CR.42 proved to be useful as a light bomber at night, but subsequently NSGr9 began to be equipped with the Ju 87D. 2.Staffel kept using the Fiat biplanes until mid-1944. On 31 May, the unit still had 18 Falchi, 15 of which were operational.

As a consequence of Allied raids that damaged the Fiat factory in Turin, only 150 CR.42LWs were ultimately completed, of which 112 would reach operational condition. Another German unit that used the type, both in Southern Italy and the Balkans, was Jagdgeschwader JG 107, which flew them as night fighters, fighter-bombers and fighter-trainers.

=== Last claimed biplane kill of history ===
The CR.42LWs equipped the newly formed 3./NSGr 7 in Zagreb, Croatia, in April 1944. By September 1944, 2. Staffel was transferred in Croatia too (at Pleso) and the Fiats later equipped 1. Staffel also, in Graz, Austria. On 8 February 1945, ten Luftwaffe CR.42LWs of Stab and 2. Staffel of Nachtschlachtgruppe 7, took off from their base in Agram-Gorica, Croatia, to strafe the airfield at Grabovica, used by partisan forces. At the last moment, they were diverted to attack partisans northwest of Sisak, during which they were attacked by a flight of American P-38 Lightnings of the 14th Fighter Group. The American fighters shot down three Fiat biplanes, but two of the P-38s did not return to base. One of them was claimed by a German pilot, but this kill was not confirmed. According to authors Håkan Gustavsson and Ludovico Slongo, the unidentified German pilot's claim is the last known claimed victory of a biplane to occur. There is doubt regarding the claim. The 14th Fighter Group's unit history does not record any losses on this date by the 37th Fighter Squadron, which reported the engagement with the biplanes. The two aircraft which failed to return to base were reported as lost to ground fire during a ground sweep near Vienna, and were in the 48th Fighter Squadron.

== Variants ==
CR.42
Early CR.42s were armed with one 12.7 mm (0.50 in) machine gun and one 7.7 mm (0.30 in) machine gun. The CR.42bis replaced the 7.7 mm with a second 12.7 mm.
CR.42 Egeo
Equipped for service within the Aegean theater, outfitted with an extra 100 L (26.4 US gal) fuel tank in the fuselage.
CR.42AS
A close air-support version. The two standard 12.7 mm machine guns could be supplemented with two more. There were underwing racks for two 220 pounds (100 kg) bombs. AS stands for 'Africa Settentrionale.' There was an additional engine filter to prevent damage from sand which caused a loss in power, a common occurrence in North Africa, since filter-less engines could be damaged after only a few hours use.
CR.42B
Dedicated 2 seat trainer variant with a lengthened fuselage to accommodate the 2nd cockpit.
CR.42bis
Standard armament of two 12.7 mm machine guns mounted.
CR.42CN
Night fighter version sometimes equipped with spotlights mounted under the wings and/or extended engine exhausts.
CR.42ter
2 × 12.7 mm (0.50 in) machine guns with two additional guns mounted in blisters under the wings.
ICR.42
Experimental floatplane version designed by CMASA, top speed decreased by only 8 km/h (5.0 mph) in spite of the 124 kg (273 lb) increase in weight.
CR.42LW
Night harassment, anti-partisan aircraft for the German Luftwaffe. The aircraft were equipped with exhaust flame dampers, a pair of 12.7 mm machine guns and underwing racks for four 50 kg bombs. 150 were built, of which 112 were accepted into service by the Luftwaffe.
CR.42 "Bombe Alari"
(unofficial but widely used name) Modification carried out at SRAMs (repair centers), to allow outdated fighters to be used in the ground attack role. Underwing pylons for 2 × 50 kg (110 lb) bombs were added; often these pylons were loaded with 100 kg (220 lb) bombs. The same modification was carried out on Fiat G.50s and Macchi C.200s.
CR.42 two-seaters
Several Italian CR.42s were converted into two-seat communications aircraft.
CR.42DB
One CR.42 was fitted with an early 895 kW (1,200 hp) DB 601A inline engine. A speed of 525 km/h (326 mph) was attained.

== Operators ==
Belgium

- Belgian Air Force

Independent State of Croatia

- Air Force of the Independent State of Croatia

Germany

- Luftwaffe

Hungary

- Royal Hungarian Air Force

Kingdom of Italy

- Regia Aeronautica
- Italian Co-Belligerent Air Force

Spain

- Spanish Air Force (two CR.42bis delivered in 1939)

Sweden

- Swedish Air Force

== Surviving aircraft ==
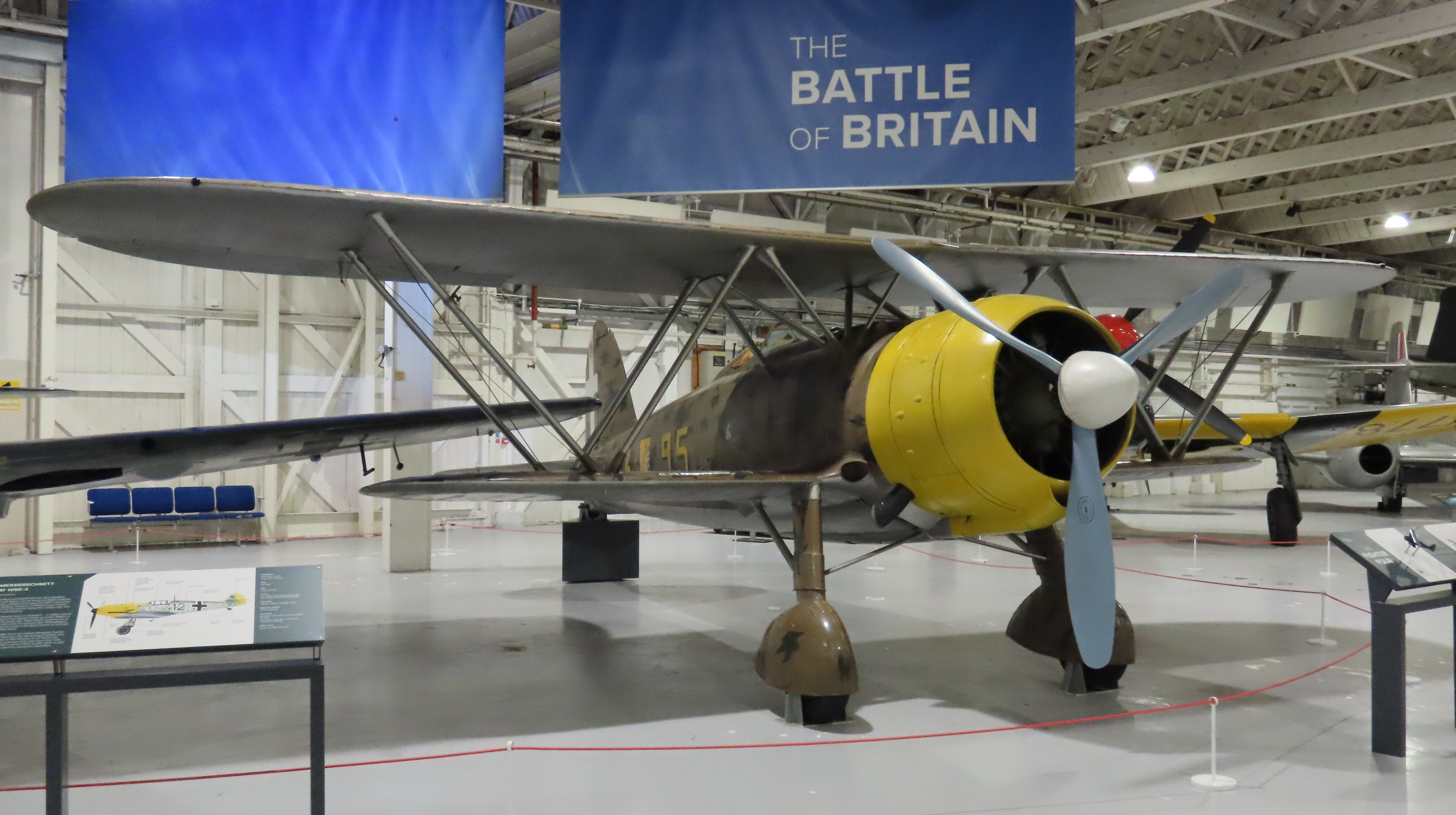
Fiat CR.42 MM5701 at the RAF Museum, London, 2024

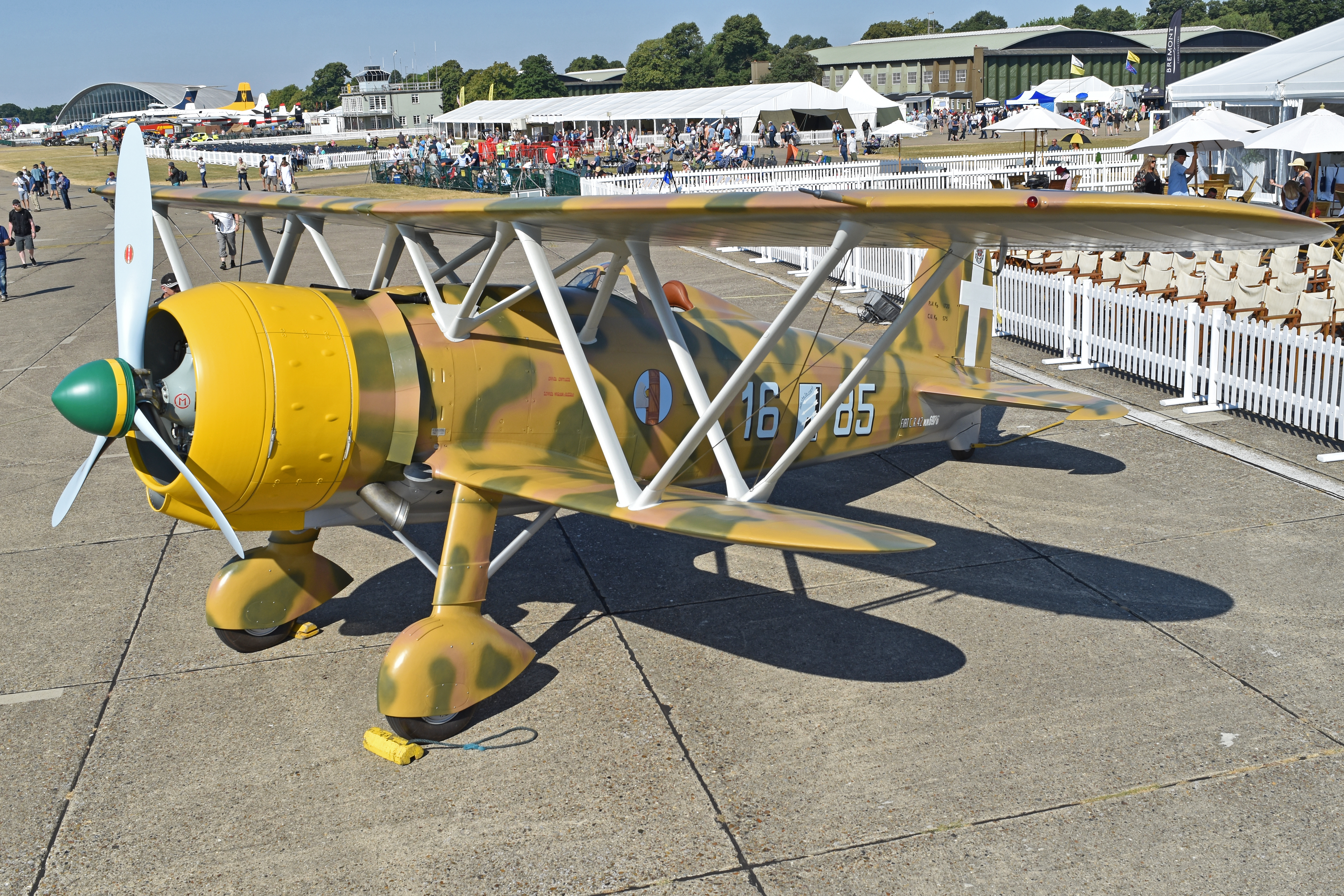
Fv2542 (G-CBLS), owned by The Fighter Collection, 2018

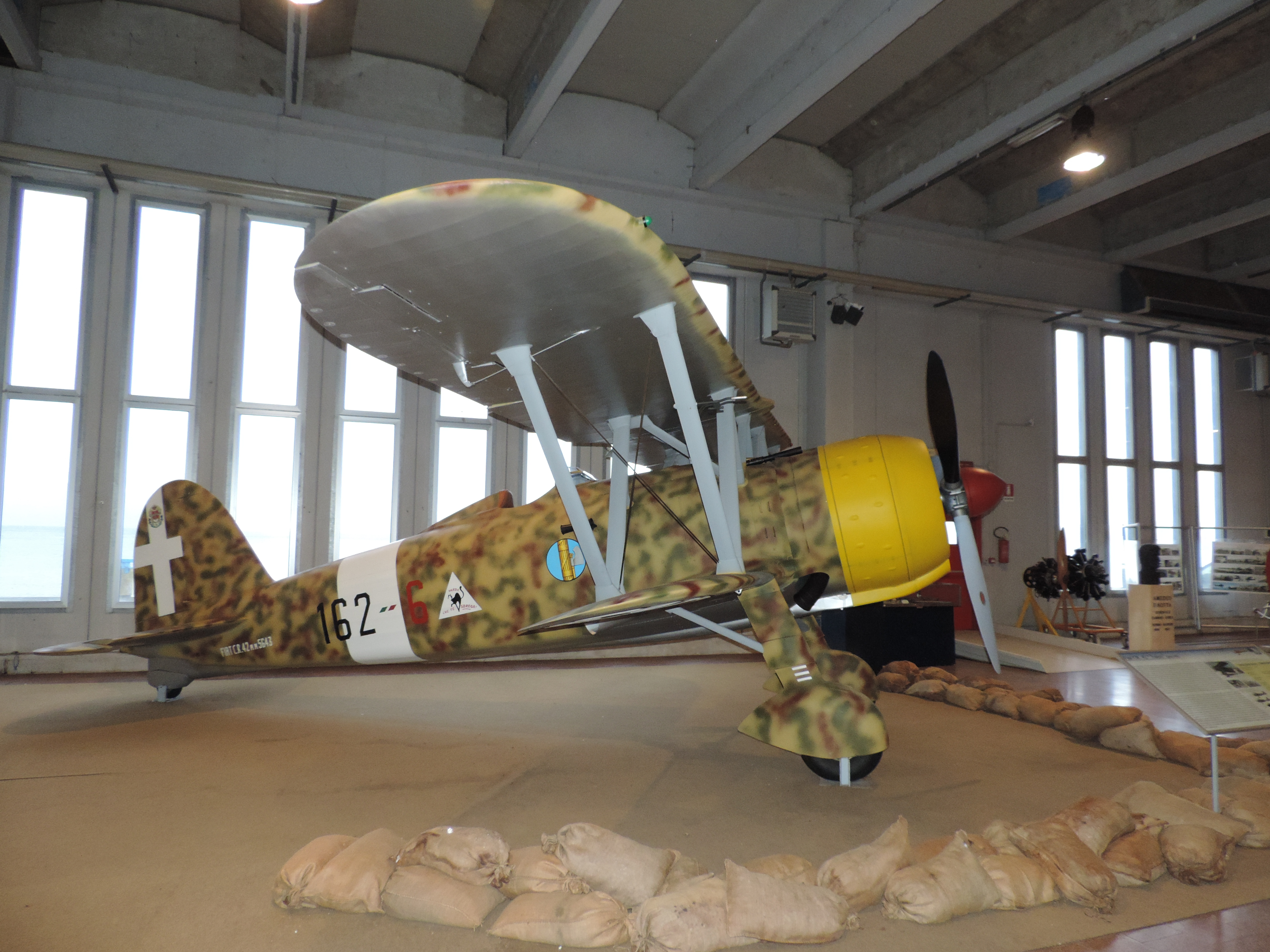
J 11 Fv 2539 / MM5643 at the Italian Air Force Museum, 2017

Four CR.42s survive, one served with the Italian Air Force, Three are former Swedish aircraft.

MM5701
CR.42 on static display at the Royal Air Force Museum London in London. In late 1940, it was assigned to the 95 Squadriglia Caccia Terreste (Land Fighter Squadron) based in Belgium. On November 11 it was one of 40 Italian fighters escorting 10 Fiat BR.20 Cicogna bombers in an attack on Harwich. However the aircraft suffered a fractured oil pipe and the overheating engine forced the pilot, Pietro Salvadori, to land on the beach at Orford Ness.

During the summer of 1941, it was flown by the Air Fighting Development Unit in mock combat against a variety of British fighters. At the end of 1943 all testing was complete and the aircraft was marked for preservation in a future museum as a result of an earlier request of the Air Historical Branch. It was subsequently stored at several RAF facilities until 1978, when it was moved to its present home, the RAF Museum.

Fv 2542
A J 11 under restoration to airworthy at The Fighter Collection in Duxford, Cambridgeshire. The aircraft was lost and the pilot, Bertil Klintman, killed in a Controlled flight into terrain accident on the 13 April 1942 in Kiruna Municipality in the north of Sweden. The aircraft was one of seven flying in an exercise at very low level over snow-covered, mountainous terrain in conditions that made judging height difficult. The body of the pilot was quickly recovered, but the aircraft remained at the crash site until it was recovered in 1983.

The wreckage was sold to the Fighter Collection in 1995, and was partially restored in Italy by the Associazione Restauro Aeronauticon and the Gruppo Amici Velivoli Storici in exchange for them being given some parts for the restoration of their aircraft. The work continues to restore the aircraft to airworthy status, but its unique nature makes this a slow process.

Fv 2543
J 11 on static display at the Swedish Air Force Museum near Linköping, Östergötland. The aircraft served with the Swedish Air Force until it was decommissioned in March 1945. While Sweden's other J 11s were scrapped, this one was placed into storage at Malmen Airbase with other aircraft by the base's commander, who wished to preserve examples of historic aircraft. It became part of the Swedish Air Force Museum's collection when the museum opened in 1984.

Fv 2539 / MM5643
This is a reconstructed aircraft on static display at the Italian Air Force Museum in Bracciano, Lazio. It is made up of 60% original parts, many of which came from a Swedish Air Force J 11, Fv 2539. Other parts came from France and Italy. It is in Italian colours as "MM4653". The reconstruction took place between 1996 and 2005. Some of the parts came from The Fighter Collecftion's aircraft, Fv 2542 which was restored at the same time.

== Specifications (CR.42) ==
3-view drawing of Fiat CR.42

Data from The Fiat CR.42

General characteristics

- Crew: 1
- Length: 8.25 m (27 ft 1 in)
- Upper wingspan: 9.7 m (31 ft 10 in)
- Lower wingspan: 6.5 m (21 ft 4 in)
- Height: 3.585 m (11 ft 9 in)
- Wing area: 22.4 m^{2} (241 sq ft)
- Empty weight: 1,782 kg (3,929 lb)
- Gross weight: 2,295 kg (5,060 lb)
- Powerplant: 1 × Fiat A.74 R.C.38 14 cylinder air-cooled radial piston engine, 627 kW (841 hp) at 3,800 m (12,500 ft) and 2,400 rpm
- Propellers: 3-bladed variable-pitch propeller

Performance

- Maximum speed: 441 km/h (274 mph, 238 kn) at 6,100 m (20,000 ft)
- Cruise speed: 399 km/h (248 mph, 215 kn)
- Landing speed: 128 km/h (80 mph; 69 kn)
- Range: 780 km (480 mi, 420 nmi)
- Service ceiling: 10,210 m (33,500 ft)
- Rate of climb: 11.8 m/s (2,320 ft/min)
- Wing loading: 102 kg/m^{2} (21 lb/sq ft)
- Power/mass: 0.28 kW/kg (0.17 hp/lb)
- Take-off run: 210 m (690 ft)
- Landing run: 340 m (1,120 ft)

Armament

- Guns: * 1x Breda SAFAT 7.7 mm (0.303 in) and 1x Breda SAFAT 12.7 mm (0.500 in) machine gun
  - Later 2 × 12.7 mm (0.500 in) Breda SAFAT machine guns, 400 rpg (most common).
  - plus 2 × 12.7 mm (0.500 in) machine guns in underwing fairing on some.
- Bombs: 200 kg (440 lb) on 2 × wing hardpoints

== See also ==
- Fiat CR.20
- Fiat CR.30
- Fiat CR.32

Related development

- Fiat CR.32

Aircraft of comparable role, configuration, and era

- Avia B-534
- Gloster Gladiator
- Gloster Gauntlet
- Polikarpov I-153

Related lists

- List of aircraft of World War II
