= Manlio Molfese =

Italian aviator (1883–1969)

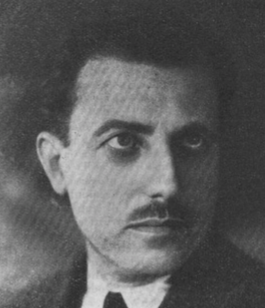
- Born: 20 September 1893; Albano di Lucania, Kingdom of Italy
- Died: 25 April 1969 (aged 75); Rome, Italy
- Military career
- Allegiance: Kingdom of Italy; Italian Social Republic
- Branch: Royal Italian Army; Regia Aeronautica; National Republican Air Force
- Rank: Colonel
- Conflicts: World War I; World War II; North African campaign; Italian campaign
- Awards: Silver Medal of Military Valor; Bronze Medal of Military Valor (twice); Croix de guerre 1914–1918

Manlio Molfese (Albano di Lucania, 20 September 1883 – Rome, 25 April 1969) was an Italian Air Force officer during World War I and World War II. During the interwar period he held various management roles in the field of civil aviation. After the Armistice of Cassibile he became State Undersecretary for the Air Force of the Italian Social Republic.

== Biography ==
=== First World War ===
He was born in Albano di Lucania on 20 September 1883, the son of notary Arcangelo Molfese and Giuseppina Maglietta. He attended high school and later the University of Naples, where he graduated in law. After the Kingdom of Italy entered the First World War on 24 May 1915, he enlisted as a volunteer, being commissioned as second lieutenant of the Territorial Militia. On 21 June he was assigned to the 4th Fortress Artillery Regiment for the defence of Mount Coni Zugna. In September of the same year he applied to attend the airplane observer course, which was to be held at the Mirafiori airfield in Turin. He was then admitted to the aviation school of the Aeronautical Service of the Royal Italian Army, and obtained the license of military airplane observer. On 6 November 1915 he was assigned to the 2nd Artillery Squadron, equipped with Caudron G.3 aircraft, based in Medeuzza, on the Isonzo, under the III Corps of the 1st Army. During his stay in Medeuzza he met Gabriele D'Annunzio, with whom he maintained correspondence for a long time.

On April 15, 1916, the 2nd Squadron was renamed 42nd Squadron, and carried out some daring topophotographic reconnaissance at very low altitude in the Gorizia area, from Monte San Michele to the Podgora (Karst plateau), in preparation of the offensive that led to the conquest of the city. After promotion to lieutenant, he served in various reconnaissance squadrons, distinguishing himself in several actions; from June 1918 he was transferred to the 40th Squadron of Castenedolo, and in the autumn of the same year to the 113th SAML Squadron of Cividate Camuno. For the operations carried out on the Karst and on the Piave he was awarded in the field, by General Armando Diaz, a silver medal for military valor and two bronze medals for military valor. On 13 June 1918 the French government decorated him with the Croix de guerre 1914–1918 with star of silver and enamels. At the end of the war he became an instructor at the Observers School located on the Centocelle Airport, after which he was discharged with the rank of major.

=== Head of Civil Aviation ===
On 13 October 1922 he joined the National Fascist Party, becoming Standard Bearer of the 5th Blackshirt Cohort of Terni, and took part in the March on Rome. Returning to civilian life, instead of resuming service at the Ministry of Education, where he worked as a legal advisor, he decided to participate in the public exam for the post Commissioner for Aviation, scoring the highest and thus obtaining the post. He held the position of Head of Air Traffic Service at the Ministry of Aeronautics, with responsibility for civil aviation, from 28 May 1924 to 15 October 1933, when he was replaced by General Aldo Pellegrini. During his tenure he participated in numerous international conventions and conferences for the international regulation of aviation, and was a member of numerous international commissions for the regulation of civil and commercial air navigation (among others, the Comitè International Technique di Experte Juridiques aeriens, of which he was a member from 1929 to 1940). His knowledge of international law, and his proven experience as a pilot, made him one of the greatest aviation experts in Italy.

In 1925 he published a book on the activity carried out by the reconnaissance aircraft of the Royal Italian Army during the years of the First World War. Between 1926 and 1933 he signed numerous aeronautical treaties between Italy and various European and African countries. Under his direction, the Italian civil aviation had a remarkable development; on 1 April 1926 the first airline from Turin to Pavia was inaugurated in the presence of Benito Mussolini, and between 1926 and 1928 the Genoa-Palermo, Brindisi-Athens-Constantinople, and Rome-Venice-Vienna lines came into operation. Air lines linking Italy with Great Britain, Germany, France, Spain, Austria, Czechoslovakia, and Algeria were also established, and new airports were built in Genoa, Trieste and Naples. Also on his initiative the Military Meteorological Service was reorganized, the Office for civil protection was created, and the Royal Air Club of Italy was established. After leaving his post as Chief of Civil Aviation he was appointed Commissioner of the National Fascist Federation of Air Crews and president of the National Insurance Fund of the Air Crews. Along with lawyer Francesco Galgano, he was part in the Royal Commission for the reform of the civil codes and civil procedure codes, which was issued in 1942.

Besides his passion for flying, Molfese also had an interest in art, and for many years he wrote on the subject in a dedicated column in the Argentine newspaper La Razon in Buenos Aires.

=== Second World War ===
When Italy entered the Second World War on 10 June 1940, he volunteered for the Regia Aeronautica ("Royal Air Force"). He was appointed delegate for the aviation sector of the Italian Armistice Commission with France (CIAF), based in Tunis, and remained in North Africa until July 1942, when he was promoted to colonel and transferred initially to the Air Force Command of Tunisia and then to that of Sicily.

==== In the Italian Social Republic ====
Following the Armistice of Cassibile, Molfese joined the Republican Fascist Party as early as 21 September 1943, and on 7 October he went to Florence to enlist in the newly established National Republican Army, under the command of Marshal Rodolfo Graziani. In December 1943 he was sent to Bassano del Grappa, where the Ministry of National Defense of the Italian Social Republic had its seat, but the Directorate of Military Personnel placed him on unlimited leave pending his final discharge. This decision prompted him to write a personal letter to the Duce in which he placed himself at his disposal, offering his experience.

After the resignation of Colonel Ernesto Botto from the office of Secretary of State for the Air Force and chief of staff of the National Republican Air Force (ANR) after he had entered into open conflict with Roberto Farinacci and with the commander of Luftflotte 2, Field Marshal Wolfram von Richthofen, General Arrigo Tessari was appointed in his place, but Tessari turned out to be openly pro-German and tried to favor the merger of the ANR into the Luftwaffe. On 26 July 1944 Mussolini replaced Tessari with Molfese as Undersecretary for the Air Force, while leaving Tessari as Chief of Staff.

Molfese staunchly opposed the German plans to transfer all aircraft, airports and personnel of the ANR under direct German control, and resisted the coup de main (Operation Phoenix) attempted by von Richthofen on 25 August 1944, giving Mussolini enough time to persuade Hitler to cancel the attempt. The failure of Operation Phoenix led to the dismissal of von Richthofen, who on September 6 was replaced by General Maximilian Ritter von Pohl. On 27 November 1944 Molfese was in turn removed from the post of State Undersecretary, replaced by General Ruggero Bonomi. On the proposal of the Head of Government, during the meeting of the Council of Ministers of 15 November 1944, he was promoted to Councilor of State.

=== Postwar ===
At the end of the war he was arrested and referred to the High Court for sanctions against Fascism. In 1946, during the trial against him for joining the Italian Social Republic, he defended himself from the accusation of collaboration with the Germans, declaring that he had joined the RSI out of a sense of honor and national dignity, pointing out his opposition to the German takeover of the ANR in August 1944, which had prevented more Italian soldiers from being deported to Germany, and had resulted in his dismissal. The Extraordinary Assize Court, accepting his defense arguments, acquitted him of the charges. He died in Rome on April 25, 1969.
