= List of World War II aces from Italy =

This is a list of aces in World War II from Italy. A flying ace or air ace is a military aviator credited with shooting down five or more enemy aircraft during aerial combat. For other countries see List of World War II aces by country.

Name	Wartime victories	Rank	Awards	Notes
Adami, Ranieri	7	Maggiore		retired as a Colonnello
Annoni, Emanuele ("Ele")	9	Capitano		retired as a Generale di Squadra Aerea
Arcangeletti, Paolo	5			
Aurili, Giuseppe	5			
Baldi, Loris	5	Sergente Maggiore		died October 7, 2015
Bandini, Luigi	5			KIA April 29, 1944
Barcaro, Giovanni	9			
Baron, Luigi ("Gino")	12	Sergente Maggiore		
Bartolacchini, Osvaldo	6			
Bartolozzi, Osvaldo	6			
Baschirotto, Gianlino ("Giri")	11	Maresciallo Pilota		Retired in 1970 as a Colonnello
Bassi, Livio	6	Tenente	GMMV	KIA April 2, 1941 (DOW)
Baylon, Giuseppe	5	Tenente Colonnello		
Bellagambi, Mario	13	Capitano		Retired in 1967 as a Generale di Brigata Aerea
Benati, Amedeo	10			
Bernardi, Duilio	5			
Biagini, Bruno	7			
Biagini, Lucio	5			KIA April 25, 1944
Bianchi, Manfredo	5			
Bianchi, Pietro	5			KIA August 2, 1943
Biron, Giuseppe ("Bepi")	10	Maggiore		Retired in 1971 as a Generale di Brigata Aerea
Bladelli, Alessandro	5 + 7 shared, 1 shared damaged		2x SMMV, 2x BMMV	
Bonet, Giovanni	8	Capitano	4x SMMV, GIC2c	KIA April 29, 1944
Bonannini, Pietro	8 + 2 prob.	Aiutante di Battaglia		Turret gunner on Cant Z.506B and Fiat RS.14 floatplanes (top turret). Credited with 4x Spitfires, 3x Blenheims and 1x Hurricane
Bonfatti, Pietro	6 + 7 shared, 2 + 3 shared probably, 4 shared damaged		2x SMMV, 1BMMV	KIA November 22, 1941
Bonzano, Mario	17	Maggiore	SMMV	retired as a Colonello
Bordoni-Bisleri, Franco ("Robur")	19	Tenente	3x SMMV (during WWII), GIC2	KIFA September 15, 1975
Botto, Ernesto	8 + 20 shared, 7 shared probably . 1 + 4 shared damaged.		GMMV	
Buogo, Egidio	5			
Buvoli, Aldo	6			
Camaioni, Antonio	8			
Canella, Carlo	7, 27 + 5 shared on ground		SMMV	
Canfora, Antonio	7			
Caselli, Gilberto	5			
Cavalli, Evasio	5			KIA July 21, 1943
Celentano, Agostino	6			
Cenni, Giuseppe	9	Maggiore	GMMV, 6x SMMV, GIC2	KIA September 4, 1943
Ceoletta, Giovanni	10	Sergente Maggiore		Retired in 1981 as a Generale di Brigata Aerea
Chiarini, Guglielmo	5	Capitano	GMMV, 2x SMMV	KIA February 4, 1941
Covre, Tullio	5	Sergente Maggiore	2x SMMV, GIC, SMCV	
Cucchi, Carlo	5			
Cuscuna, Francesco	5, 1 shared probable, 2 shared damaged.		2x SMMV	
Daffara, Vittorino	13 + 1 shared, 4 damaged.			
Damiani, Rinaldo	6 + 3 shared, 4 shared damaged, 1 damaged on the ground.			
Dell'Innocenti, Giovanni	12			KIA July 3, 1943
Bert, Cesare Di	6	Sergente Piloti	3x SMMV	
Briona, Giorgio Di	11	Capitano	SMMV, GIC2	
Doglio, Furio	7	Capitano	GMMV (3x during WWII), LBM (1936), SMA, SMMV, 2x BMMV, GIC2	KIA July 27, 1942, on Gozo, by Canadian top aceGeorge Beurling
Drago, Ugo	17 + 3 shared, 1 shared damaged on the ground.	Capitano	4x SMMV, CMV	11 victories with RSI
Ettore, Domenico	5			
Facchini Dotta, Domenico	5			
Fanali, Duilio	15	Tenente Colonnello	5x SMMV, 2x BMMV, CMW	Retired 1971 as a Generale di Squadra Aerea
Ferazzani, Giuseppe	5			
Ferla, Germano La	13		GMV, SMMV	
Ferrulli, Leonardo	21 (+ 1 in Spain)	Sottotenente	GMV, SMMV	KIA July 5, 1943
Fibbia, Guido	6 (+ 3 in Spain)	Maresciallo Pilota	2x SMMV, BMMV, WMC, GIC2	
Filippi, Fausto	8			KIA January 23, 1945
Filippi, Luigi	7 + 1 shared.		SMMV, BMMV	KIA February 20, 1943
Fissore, Giuliano	3 shared			
Forlani, Dino	7			
Fornaci, Fausto	9	Maresciallo Pilota		KIA February 6, 1945
Foschini, Ettore	7			
François, Armando	7 + 3 shared		SMMV, BMMV, SMA, BMA, WMC	
Frigerio, Iacopo	5 + 4 shared, 1 probably, 4 + 4 shared damaged		SMMV, BMMV, GIC2	
Gaucci, Roberto	7			
Giannella, Luigi	12	Capitano		Retired in the 1960s as a Colonnello
Giardina, Antonio	5		2x SMMV, 1BMMV	
Giudice, Eber	5		SMMV, BMMV	
Gorrini, Luigi	19	Sergente Maggiore	GMMV (in 1958), BMMV, GIC1, GIC2	(4 victories with RSI air force)
Graffer, Giorgio	5	Capitano	GMMV, BMMV	KIA November 28, 1940
Guarnaccia, Filippo	7			
Guerci, Mario	5			
Guidi, Amedeo	6 + 3 shared, 1 + 2 shared probable, 2 + 2 shared damaged.		SMMV, 2x WMC	
Guiducci, Spiridone	5			
Incerto, Enrico	8, 2 probably, 3 damaged (Spain)		GMV, SMMV	
Iellici, Luigi	5			
Laiolo, Domenico	6	Sergente Maggiore		
Lauri, Furio	11 (approx.)		GMV, 2x SMMV, CMV	
Leotta, Eugenio	5			
Locatelli, Bruno	5			
Longhi, Felice	6 + 4 shared, 4 shared damaged.		3x SMMV, CMV, GIC2	
Longhini, Antonio	8	Tenente		KIA November 16, 1944
Lucchini, Franco	21 + 6 shared (+ 5 in Spain + 52 shared)	Capitano	GMMV(Posthumous), 5x SMMV, BMMV, GIC(2c)	KIA July 5, 1943, on Sicily
Magnaghi, Carlo	11	Maresciallo Pilota		
Magrini, Vasco	11			KIFA July 1961
Malagola, Willy	11			
Malvezzi, Fernando	10	Capitano		
Mandolini, Orlando	7 + 1 shared, 1 + 1 shared damaged, 1 armoured car on the ground.		SMMV, WMC, GIC2	
Mantelli, Adriano	10 + 6 shared (including in Spain)		2x SMMV, WMC	
Marconcini, Giuseppe	6			
Mariotti, Luigi	5 + 10 shared, 1 shared damaged on the ground.	Maggiore	4x SMMV, BMMV, WMC	KIA on December 27, 1944, in Bell P-39Q by German Flak
Martinoli, Teresio	22 + 14 shared	Sergente Maggiore	GMV, SMMV, GIC2	KIFA in Bell P-39 (1 victory with Italian Co-Belligerent Air Force)
Mastroagostino, Angelo	11			
Maurer, Sergio	5			KIA May 6, 1943
Mazzitelli, Orfeo	8 + 14 shared	Tenente		
Mecatti, Mario	6			
Melis, Mario	5			
Miani, Carlo	7	Capitano		Ritired in 1962 as a Tenente Colonnello. Died April 16, 1994.
Minguzzi, Vittorio	13			
Miotto, Elio	5 + 8 shared, 2 shared probably.		3x SMMV	KIFA March 21, 1945, during a training flight in a Bell P-39
Montagnani, Gianfranco	5			
Montegnacco, Brunetto Di	15, 1 on the ground.		SMMV	KIA April 13, 1938. All victories during the Spanish War
Monterumici, Amleto	6			
Monti, Luigi	8 + 19 shared, 3 shared probably, 3 + 1 shared damaged		SMMV, BMMV, WMC	
Moretto, Enrico	5			
Morosi, Luigi	5			
Mottet, Giuseppe	6 + at least 4 shared, 2 damaged.		BMMV	KIFA March 30, 1950
Nioi, Clizio	7 + 1 shared, 1 probably, 1 damaged	Capitano	3x SMMV	
Nobili, Guido	9 + 2 shared, 1 probably.	Colonello	3x SMMV, WMC	Died July 10, 1943, during the 1st day of Operation Husky.
Noveli, Raffaello	5			
Oblach, Giuseppe ("Garolla")	7, 2 probably, 1 + 1 shared damaged	Tenente	GMV, 2x SMMV	KIA December 1, 1942
Ocarso, Dante	5			KIA November 28, 1942
Omiccioli, Enzo ("Cioli")	5 + 2 shared	Maresciallo di terza classe	GMV	KIA February 3, 1941. Brother of Walter Omiccioli.
Omiccioli, Walter ("Valterino"/"Ciulìn"/"Tigre 18")	9	Sergente Piloti		Brother of Enzo Omiccioli. Died January 30, 2009
Palazzeschi, Antonio	5			
Pecchiari, Francesco	5			KIA July 6, 1942, by Canadian top aceGeorge Beurling
Perdoni, Luciano	5 + 3 shared, 2 shared probable, 1 shared damaged.		SMMV, 2x BMMV, 3x WMC	
Pergameni, Antonio	7 + 5 shared, 1 probably, 1 + 7 shared damaged.		4x SMMV	KIA June 26, 1942
Petrosellini, Costantino ("Pedro")	5	Sottotenente	3x SMMV, 2x WMC	Left the Aeronautica Militare in 1956 as a Tenente Colonnello, and started flying for Alitalia. Died January 21, 2015
Pinna, Mario	5 + 6 shared, 1 probably, 1 damaged, 3 armoured cars shared		2x SMMV, BMMV, WMC	
Pluda, Mario	5			KIA November 8, 1941
Pocek, Giorgio	5			
Poggio Suasa, Carlo di	11	Maggiore		
Presel, Guido	12 + 10 shared, 2 probably, 2 on the ground (all in Spain).		GMV, 2x SMMV, 2x BMMV	KIA June 5, 1937
Querci, Alvaro	6 + 5 shared, 1 + 1 shared probably, 3 shared damaged.		SMMV, BMMV	
Reiner, Giulio	10 + 57 shared, 7 + 23 shared probably, 2 + 9 shared damaged, 3 + 3 shared on the ground.	Capitano	SMMV;BMMV;GIC2	Retired in 1949 as a Maggiore. Died September 6, 2002
Remondino, Aldo	5			
Ricci, Corrado	5 + 7 shared, 1 + 1 shared probable, 4 on the ground		2x SMMV, WMC	Died 1995
Robetto, Giuseppe	10 + 20 shared + 4 probably + 2 on the ground	Capitano	GIC1, GIC2, 3x SMMV, BMMV	Died in Argentina in 1984
Rodoz, Diego	6			
Romagnoli, Carlo	11		GMV	KIA September 7, 1941
Roveda, Riccardo	5	Tenente Colonnello		
Ruspoli, Carlo	11			Born in 1906, Ruspoli is recorded as probably the oldest Italian fighter pilot to become an ace in World War II, achieving his 11 victories first in North Africa and then on the Russian front.
Ruzzin, Giuseppe	5 + 6 shared, 8 + 4 shared damaged		2x SMMV, BMMV, WMC	Died February 6, 2009
Sajeva, Giovanni	5			
Salvatore, Massimo	10 + 6 shared, 3 probably)		SMMV, BMMV	
Sanson, Attilio	12			
Sant'Andrea, Vincenzo	7			
Savini, Angelo	7 + 7 shared, 1 + 1 shared probable		SMMV, 2x BMMV	
Scarpetta, Per	6	Maggiore	3x SMMV, 2x BMMV, WMC	KIA August 14, 1942
Schiappacasse, Lombardo	7			
Seganti, Carlo	5	Tenente	GMMV (Posthumous)	KIA July 12, 1942, North of Malta, by Canadian aceGeorge Beurling, while searching for a Missing In Action fellow pilot.
Seidl, Ricardo	6		GMV	KIA September 27, 1941
Serafini, Ferruccio	9	Sergente Piloti		
Serini, Pietro	11	Maggiore		
Simionato, Olindo	5			
Soffritti, Aroldo	8, 5 probably, 1 damaged, 11 shared on the ground, 5 shared damaged on the ground	Maresciallo Pilota	2x SMMV	Died February 18, 1977
Solaro, Claudio	12 + 14 shared, 1 + 1 shared probable, 8 shared damaged, 20 on the ground	Capitano	2x SMMV, 3x BMMV, 3x WMC, GIC2	Retired as a Generale di Squadra Aerea
Solaroli, Giorgio	11			
Spigaglia, Alberto	6 + 4 shared		2x SMMV, BMMV, WMC	
Squarcia, Vittorio	5			
Stabile, Natalino	10 + 2 shared			
Sterzi, Annibale	5			
Talamini, Renato	5 + 4 shared, 3 + 5 shared damaged.	Tenente	SMMV, BMMV	KIA April 10, 1944
Tarantola, Ennio ("Banana")	11 + 4 shared, 1 probably, 1 on the sea + 1 in Spain with Aviazione Legionaria	Maresciallo Pilota	2x SMMV(during WWII, + 2 in Spain), 2x BMMV	Died July 30, 2001
Tessari, Arrigo	5		3x SMMV, BMMV, WMC	
Torchio, Luigi	5		SMMV, WMC	KIA January 30, 1944
Torresi, Giulio	10 + 10 shared, 5 + 2 shared probable, 11 shared damaged	Capitano	4x SMMV, GIC2	KIA July 1, 1944
Tugnoli, Giorgio	6 + 4 shared, 1 probable		3x SMMV, BMMV, WMC	
Valenzano, Raffaele	8			
Valtancoli, Tito	8			
Vanzan, Virgilio	7			
Veronese, Alberto	6		2x SMMV	KIA November 4, 1944
Veronesi, Mario	11 + 6 shared, 2 + 2 shared probably, 1 damaged.		SMMV, BMMV, GIC2	
Visconti di Lampugnano, Adriano	10	Maggiore		7 victories with RSI; Shot in the back by Russian guard after surrender April 29, 1945
Visintini, Mario	16 (+ 2 in Spain), 5 probable, 32 on the ground (solo + shared)	Capitano	GMMV, SMMV, BMMV	Highest scoring biplane pilot of the war and most successful pilot of the East African campaign KIFA February 11, 1941
Zemella, Celso	5 + 1 shared		3x SMMV, BMMV, GIC2	
Zotti, Andrea	9 + 3 shared, 1 damaged			KIA March 16, 1940
Zotti, Nicola	5			
Zuccarini, Gian	5			

== See also ==
- Regia Aeronautica, the air force of the Kingdom of Italy
- Italian Co-Belligerent Air Force (Aeronautica Cobelligerante del Sud), the air force of the Royalist Badoglio-government in southern Italy during the last years of World War II
- Aeronautica Nazionale Repubblicana, the air force of the Italian Social Republic
- Esercito Nazionale Repubblicano, the army of the Italian Social Republic
- Marina Nazionale Repubblicana, the navy of the Italian Social Republic
- Aviazione Legionaria, an expeditionary corps from the Italian Royal Air Force (Regia Aeronautica Italiana), set up in 1936 and sent to provide support to the rebel faction in the Spanish Civil War.
- in Italian, List of World War II aces from Italy in Italian language.

== Notes ==
Abbreviations

- "KIA" – Killed in action (dates are included where possible).
- "KIFA" – Killed in Flying Accident.
- "MIA" – Missing in action.
- "WIA" – Wounded in action.
- "DOW" – died of wounds received in action (WIA).
- "POW" – taken Prisoner of war.

Awards

Award	Title
BMA	(Kingdom of Italy) Medaglia di bronzo commemorativa d'impresse aeronautiche (Bronze Medal of Aviation)
BMMV	(Kingdom of Italy) Medaglia di bronzo al Valore Militare (Bronze Medal of Military Valor)
CMV	(Kingdom of Italy) Croce di Guerra al Valor Militare (War Cross for Military Valor)
GIC1	(Nazi Germany) Eisernes Kreuz I. Klasse (German Iron Cross 1st Class)
GIC2	(Nazi Germany) Eisernes Kreuz II. Klasse (German Iron Cross 2nd Class)
GMMV	(Kingdom of Italy) Medaglia d'oro al Valore Militare (Gold Medal of Military Valour)
LBM	(France) Médaille Louis Blériot (FAI's Louis Blériot medal)
SMA	(Kingdom of Italy) Medaglia d'argento commemorativa d'impresse aeronautiche (Silver Medal of Aviation)
SMCV	(Kingdom of Italy) Medaglia d'Argento al Valore Militare (Silver Medal of Civil Valor)
SMMV	(Kingdom of Italy) Medaglia d'Argento al Valore Militare (Silver Medal of Military Valor)
WMC	(Kingdom of Italy) Croce al Merito di Guerra (War Merit Cross (Italy))
