= Ruggero Bonomi =

Italian Air Force general

- Born: 6 February 1898; Lugo, Kingdom of Italy
- Died: 12 April 1980 (aged 82); Oderzo, Italy
- Military career
- Allegiance: Kingdom of Italy; Italian Social Republic
- Branch: Regia Marina; Regia Aeronautica; National Republican Air Force
- Service years: 1914–1945
- Rank: Air Brigade General
- Commands: Passignano sul Trasimeno Flying School; Augusta Seaplane Group; 91st Autonomous Bombardment Group; 31st Maritime Bombardment Wing; 30th Land Bombardment Wing; 36th Land Bombardment Wing; 15th Bombardment Brigade "Drago" Bombardment Division; Air Force of Western Libya; Auxiliary Naval Aviation
- Conflicts: World War I; Spanish Civil War; Italian invasion of Albania; World War II; Battle of Britain; North African campaign; Italian campaign
- Awards: Silver Medal of Military Valor; Military Order of Italy; Order of the Crown of Italy; Order of Saints Maurice and Lazarus; Iron Cross Second Class

Ruggero Bonomi (6 February 1898 – 12 April 1980) was an Italian Air Force general during the Spanish Civil War and World War II. He was deputy commander of the Corpo Aereo Italiano and commander of the Auxiliary Naval Air Force; after the Armistice of Cassibile he became the last State Undersecretary for the Air Force of the Italian Social Republic.

== Biography ==
=== Early life and naval career ===
He was born in Lugo, in the province of Ravenna, on 23 September 1898, the fourth of six children of lawyer Eufrasio Bonomi and Elena Archi. After studies in classical literature at the Salesian Institute in Faenza, at age sixteen he entered the Royal Naval Academy of Livorno; from 30 October 1916 to 15 July 1917 he served as an officer cadet on the training ship Flavio Gioia. After graduation, in March 1919 he was assigned as a midshipman on the battleship Dante Alighieri, operating between Zara, Fiume and Šibenik during the inter-allied occupation. During this turbulent period he met Gabriele d'Annunzio, who introduced him to the world of aviation, leading him to discover the exploits of two famous aviators from his hometown, Francesco Baracca and Giuseppe Miraglia. He was then transferred to the battleship Conte di Cavour and took part in a cruise to North America, being promoted to Ensign on 14 September the same year. He was later assigned again to the Dante Alighieri, then in November 1920 to the protected cruiser Libia, and in March 1921 to the scout cruiser Nino Bixio, based in Taranto. In January 1921 he asked to be admitted to a course for seaplane pilots at the School of the Royal Italian Navy of Taranto, obtaining the military pilot license in November of the same year, and afterwards remaining in service at the school as an instructor. From 23 December 1921 to 20 August 1922 he served at the G. Fieschi seaplane base in La Spezia, then he returned to the Naval Academy to attend the higher course, at the end of which he was again assigned on the battleship Conte di Cavour.

=== In the Regia Aeronautica ===
In 1923 the Regia Aeronautica was established, and he immediately submitted a request to be transferred to the new armed force, entering service with the rank of lieutenant. In the middle of August he was assigned to the Taranto seaplane base with the role of clerk in the Command of the 23rd Wing. On 28 November 1925 he was admitted to participate in the 1st Higher Course of the Regia Aeronautica, leaving it on 15 June 1924 with the rank of captain to take command of the Passignano sul Trasimeno flying school. After the flying cruises to the Americas, General Francesco De Pinedo wanted him as his flight attendant at the Command of the 3rd Territorial Air Zone. In 1928 he took part in the Western Mediterranean Cruise piloting a Savoia-Marchetti S.62 seaplane, and then in the Eastern Mediterranean cruise aboard a Savoia-Marchetti S.55. He moved De Pinedo's S.55 "Santa Maria" from Italy to Paris, where it was exhibited at the Paris-Le Bourget International Air Show. In September 1929 he took command of the Augusta seaplane base and of the local seaplane group, equipped with Savoia-Marchetti S.59bis aircraft. He was promoted to major on 15 April 1931, and made a judge at the military court of Palermo. During this post, which lasted a year and a half, he became commander of the 91st Autonomous Bombardment Group and of the Cadimare seaplane base. The command of the Regia Aeronautica entrusted him with the task of elaborating the doctrines and tactics of use for launching torpedoes from aircraft, and between 1933 and 1934 he carried out a long series of tests with the Macchi M.24 seaplanes and SIAI-Marchetti S.55. During 1934 he was promoted to lieutenant colonel, and on the following year he published in the Aeronautical Magazine a long article on the experiences he had made and on the results obtained from his experimental work.

From June 1935 to March 1936 he held the position of technical consultant at the Institute of Maritime Warfare of Livorno, after which he assumed command of the 31st Maritime Bombardment Wing based in Orbetello. On 28 July 1936, ten days after the start of the Spanish Civil War, the Chief of Staff of the Regia Aeronautica, General Giuseppe Valle, entrusted him with the task of delivering twelve Savoia-Marchetti S.M.81 Pipistrello bombers to the Nationalist air force. The twelve aircraft took off from Cagliari Elmas Airport and landed on the airport of Nador, located near Melilla (Spanish Morocco), after a flight hampered by adverse weather conditions that caused the loss of three aircraft. Bonomi's stay in Spain, which was supposed to last only a few days, ended up lasting for seven months, and he took part in numerous actions. Assuming the cover name of Francesco Federici, he was in command of the aircraft and of the men of the Regia Aeronautica that flowed into Nationalist-controlled Spanish territory. On 28 December 1936 the Aviazione Legionaria was established, under the command of General Vincenzo Velardi, but Bonomi remained in Spain at the explicit request of the Nationalist authorities, as consultant and liaison with the Italian authorities. He was repatriated from Cádiz on 4 March 1937, and on 1 May he assumed command of the 30th Land Bombardment Wing in Forlì. On 1 February 1938 he was transferred to the command of the 36th Wing, equipped with the first Savoia-Marchetti SM.79 Sparviero bombers, and between 5 and 21 April 1939 he took part in the occupation of Albania. From 16 June to early December he was Chief of Staff of the 2nd Territorial Air Zone in Padua. In December he was transferred to Rome, as Deputy Chief of Staff at the Ministry of Aeronautics.

=== World War II ===
On 12 December 1940, six months after Italy's entry into World War II, he was promoted to Air Brigade General (equivalent to air commodore) and appointed commander of the 15th Bombardment Brigade, equipped with Fiat BR.20 Cicognas. As deputy commander of the Corpo Aereo Italiano, he led the bombers during operations against Great Britain. After his return to his Italy he assumed the interim command of the "Drago" Bombardment Division, and then the direction of the 3rd Department of the General Staff in Rome. During his activity he maintained daily contacts with the highest military and civil authorities, carrying out inspections in Libya and Sicily, and on 31 December 1941 he was appointed commander of the Air Force of Tripolitania. On 5 January 1943 he was repatriated for a short period of convalescence, but he never returned to Libya, as on 6 February he assumed command of the Auxiliary Aviation of the Navy (MARINAVIA), taking over from General Alberto Briganti. He held this post until the proclamation of the Armistice of Cassibile, on 8 September 1943.

On 9 September he went to the Ministry of the Navy in search of orders, and there he had a meeting with Admiral Luigi Sansonetti, Deputy Chief of Staff of the Navy, who told him that he was dependent on the air force and that he had to go to the aforementioned Ministry to receive the requested orders. He then went to the Ministry of Aeronautics, where the Deputy Chief of Staff of the Air Force, General Giuseppe Santoro, told him that his units were under the Ministry of the Navy, and there he would have to go to receive orders. Santoro also informed him that all the ministers and chiefs of staff of the armed forces had left Rome for an unknown destination. Returning to his office, on the afternoon of the same day he issued orders for the transfer of the aircraft stationed in the Aegean to Brindisi, and of those of Provence to La Spezia. All aircraft unable to be transferred were to be destroyed, and ground personnel had to join, where possible, any units of the Army or Navy that might be present in the area. On 10 September he met with General Aldo Urbani, former head of cabinet of the Air Force Minister General Renato Sandalli, who had remained in his post. General Urbani was appointed Commissioner of the Air Force in Rome, and tried to help him save what could be saved from the Germans, while avoiding the total breakdown of the units. He was later contacted by some Air Force officers and invited to meet with Minister Alessandro Pavolini, to join the newly established Italian Social Republic, but never having been a member of the Fascist Party, he declined the invitation.

=== Italian Social Republic ===
Lieutenant Colonel Ernesto Botto was appointed as new Undersecretary of State for the Air Force, and went to Rome to meet General Urbani, as the latter, thanks to the good personal relations he had established with the German command in the capital, had managed to save Air Force personnel from deportation to Germany. Near the second half of October 1943, the Undersecretariat of State for the Air Force began to move from Rome to Bassano del Grappa, and Bonomi effectively became a liaison officer with the command of Luftflotte 2 in Abano Terme. On December 18, Lieutenant Colonel Botto announced that the Undersecretariat was moving to Bellagio, but on 7 March 1944, Botto was replaced by General Arrigo Tessari, who also assumed the position of Chief of Staff of the Aeronautica Nazionale Repubblicana. Tessari remained undersecretary for a short time, replaced on 26 July by Lieutenant Colonel Manlio Molfese. On 27 November 1944, after tense talks with Marshal Rodolfo Graziani and Benito Mussolini, Bonomi agreed to take the place of Molfese as Undersecretary for the Air Force, and as a first decision he moved the seat of the Undersecretariat from Bellagio in Milan, appointing Lieutenant Colonel Giuseppe Baylon as new Chief of Staff of the A.N.R.. During his mandate he always tried to avoid the use of the units under his orders against Italian targets, and when at the beginning of April 1945 the situation precipitated with the advance of the Allied forces in Romagna and across the Tuscan-Emilian Apennine, the supreme command of the Italian Social Republic arranged the retreat of the military units towards the Valtellina.

Together with the personal secretary of the Duce, Luigi Gatti, Bonomi organized an evacuation flight of the highest personalities of the regime from Ghedi to Spain, which was to take place on 22 April 1945 using an S.79 with Croatian insignia, but this flight did not place due to Mussolini's refusal. Together with Graziani and Adjutant General Rosario Sorrentino, Bonomi left Milan for Menaggio, where Mussolini was staying, and then for Como, where the surviving RSI leaders were meeting. On 27 April he, Graziani and Sorrentino surrendered in Cernobbio to the representatives of the National Liberation Committee, assisted by Captain Emilio Q. Daddario of the United States Army. The three were transferred to Milan, where they spent one night at the Hotel Regina, still manned by the SS (who had made a deal with Captain Daddario and were waiting for the arrival of regular Allied troops to surrender to them), and another at the Hotel Milano, occupied by the Office of Strategic Services Mission directed by Biagio Max Corvo. Leaving the Hotel Milano, the three spent the afternoon of 29 April in the San Vittore prison, but at five in the afternoon they left Milan by car to be transferred to Ghedi, as prisoners of the IV U.S. Corps. Bonomi was later transferred to the Coltano prisoner-of-war camp, and then to the prison of Florence in December. Towards the middle of January 1946 he was transferred to Milan, where on 19 June the Court of Assize acquitted him with full formula of all charges, a sentence confirmed by the Court of Cassation on 15 December 1947. Shortly afterwards, a Special Commission of the Ministry of Defence decided to place him on absolute leave with retroactive effect from September 1945. He then retired to private life, writing a memoir in 1970 in which he recounted the course of events, in particular the last hours before the surrender to the Allies. He died in Oderzo on 12 April 1980.
