= Adriano Visconti =

Italy flying aces

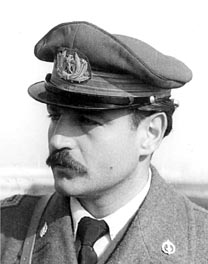
- Born: Adriano Visconti di Lampugnano; 11 November 1915; Tripoli, Libya, Kingdom of Italy
- Died: 29 April 1945 (aged 29); Milan, Italian Social Republic
- Cause of death: Execution by firing squad
- Burial place: Cimitero Monumentale, Milan, Italy; 45°29′09″N 9°10′45″E
- Military career
- Allegiance: Kingdom of Italy; Italian Social Republic
- Branch: Regia Aeronautica; National Republican Air Force
- Service years: 1936–1945
- Rank: Major
- Commands: 1st Fighter Group "Asso di Bastoni"
- Battles: Second World War; Western Desert campaign; Italian campaign
- Awards: Bronze Medal of Military Valor; Silver Medal of Military Valor

Major Adriano Visconti di Lampugnano (11 November 1915 – 29 April 1945) was one of Italy's top flying aces of the Second World War, during which he shot down between 10 and 26 enemy aircraft. He was awarded four Silver Medals of Military Valor and two Bronze Medals of Military Valor.

== Early years ==
The son of Count Galeazzo Visconti and Cecilia Dall'Aglio, he was born in Tripoli, Italian Libya. His parents were two Italian colonists who settled in Tripolitania in 1911. Since he was a teenager he displayed a passion for aircraft.

He joined the Italian Royal Air Force (Regia Aeronautica) in October 1936 and completed his pilot training at the Accademia Aeronautica in Caserta.

== Career ==
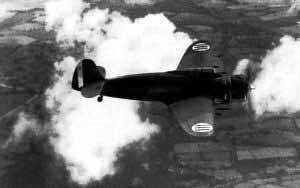
Breda Ba.65: Visconti started World War II as a ground-attack pilot.

Visconti graduated on the Breda BA25, and later flew Ro.41s. In 1939 he was commissioned as a Sub-Lieutenant Pilot (Sottotenente Pilota) and posted to the Breda 65 equipped 159ª Squadriglia, 12º Gruppo 50º Stormo, a ground attack unit based at Tobruk.

He was soon briefly posted to 2º Gruppo Aviazione Presidio Coloniale's 23ª Squadriglia for disciplinary reasons, but was allowed to return to his original unit for "heroism under fire": Visconti's Breda Ba.65 had been attacked by three 33 Squadron Gladiators but, because of his skill as a pilot, Visconti and his crew escaped the encounter. For this action, in addition to being allowed to return to 50º Stormo, Visconti was awarded the first of his Bronze Medal of Military Valor. From June 1940 until the end of that year he flew continually without leave, and was awarded another bronze medal and two Silver Medals of Military Valor.

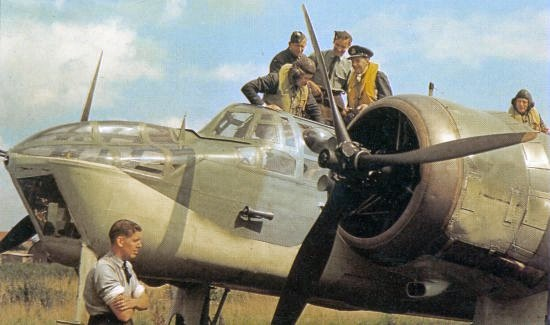
A Bristol Blenheim bomber was the first "victim" of Visconti.

By January 1941 50º Stormo had taken such heavy losses that the unit was disbanded. Visconti was detached to the 54º Stormo, 7º Gruppo, 76ª Squadriglia, where he learned to fly the Macchi C.200. He then flew the superior Macchi C.202 from the end of 1941 until the Italian Armistice of September 8, 1943.

On 22 December 1941, in a dogfight over Malta, he was credited with a "probable" Hawker Hurricane. His first official air victory was on the 15 June 1942, when he shot down a Bristol Blenheim near the island of Pantelleria. On 13 August 1942 while flying with a wingman in a formation of two C.202s on a reconnaissance flight over Malta looking for a shipping convoy, the Italian aircraft were bounced by four Supermarine Spitfire escorting the ships. Visconti, only flying the Macchi for the second time, was able to shoot down two Spitfires and damage the other two, allowing the other Macchi to complete the reconnaissance mission. For this double air victory, Visconti was awarded a Silver Medal of Military valour.

After the armistice, Visconti continued to fly with the newly formed National Republican Air Force (Aeronautica Nazionale Repubblicana, or ANR) of the Italian Social Republic (Repubblica Sociale Italiana, or RSI). Shortly after joining the ANR, Visconti was promoted to captain, commanding the 1st Squadron in the 1st Gruppo Caccia. In May 1944, he was promoted to major.

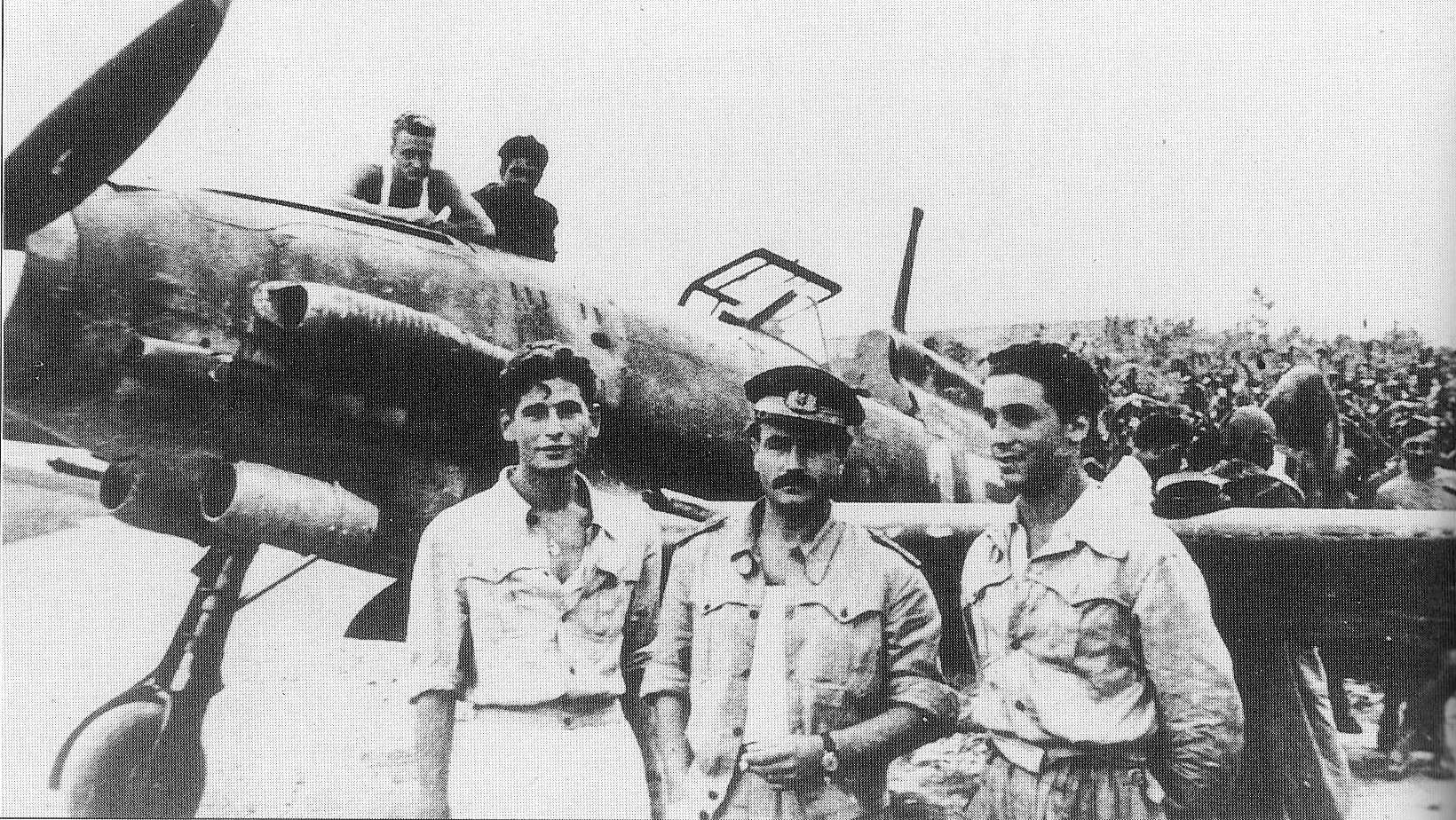
Aurelio Morandi, Adriano Visconti and Roberto Di Lollo, c. 1945.

Until the disbanding of the ANR in 1945, Visconti flew the Macchi C.205 and the Messerschmitt Bf 109G-10. He was credited with his first "kill" with the ANR on 3 January 1944, when, flying a C.205, he downed a P-38 Lightning South of the Piedmontese city of Cuneo. Visconti was wounded on several occasions, but never seriously.

Although he never claimed more than ten kills some later source credited him with 26. Most of his victories were while flying the Macchi 205V; the last, a P-47 over Lake Garda, on 14 March 1945, was in a Bf 109 G10 designated "3-4" but in reality was only a "claim", since the pilot he met in the head-on dogfight wasn't actually shot down.

In fact, on 14 March 1945 Adriano Visconti was shot down, by the USAAF pilot, 2nd/Lt Charles Clark Eddy Jr. in a P-47 he named "Chickenbones" of 346th FS, 350th FG. They were in a dogfight in the Lake Garda area when Visconti's plane was hit and disabled by Eddy in a frontal attack, Visconti parachuted out at a very low altitude and survived his moderate wounds, while Eddy's P-47 came back safely to his Pisa airbase. This story can be verified by reading the article "L'UOMO CHE ABBATTE' VISCONTI" (THE MAN WHO SHOT DOWN VISCONTI), in 3 March 1989 issue of the Italian magazine "Aeronautica", which was based on the notes taken at the time by Eddy in his notebook, allowing to retrace the combat and to understand that he was the "adversary" of Visconti (a fact completely unknown to Eddy himself till then).

== Death ==
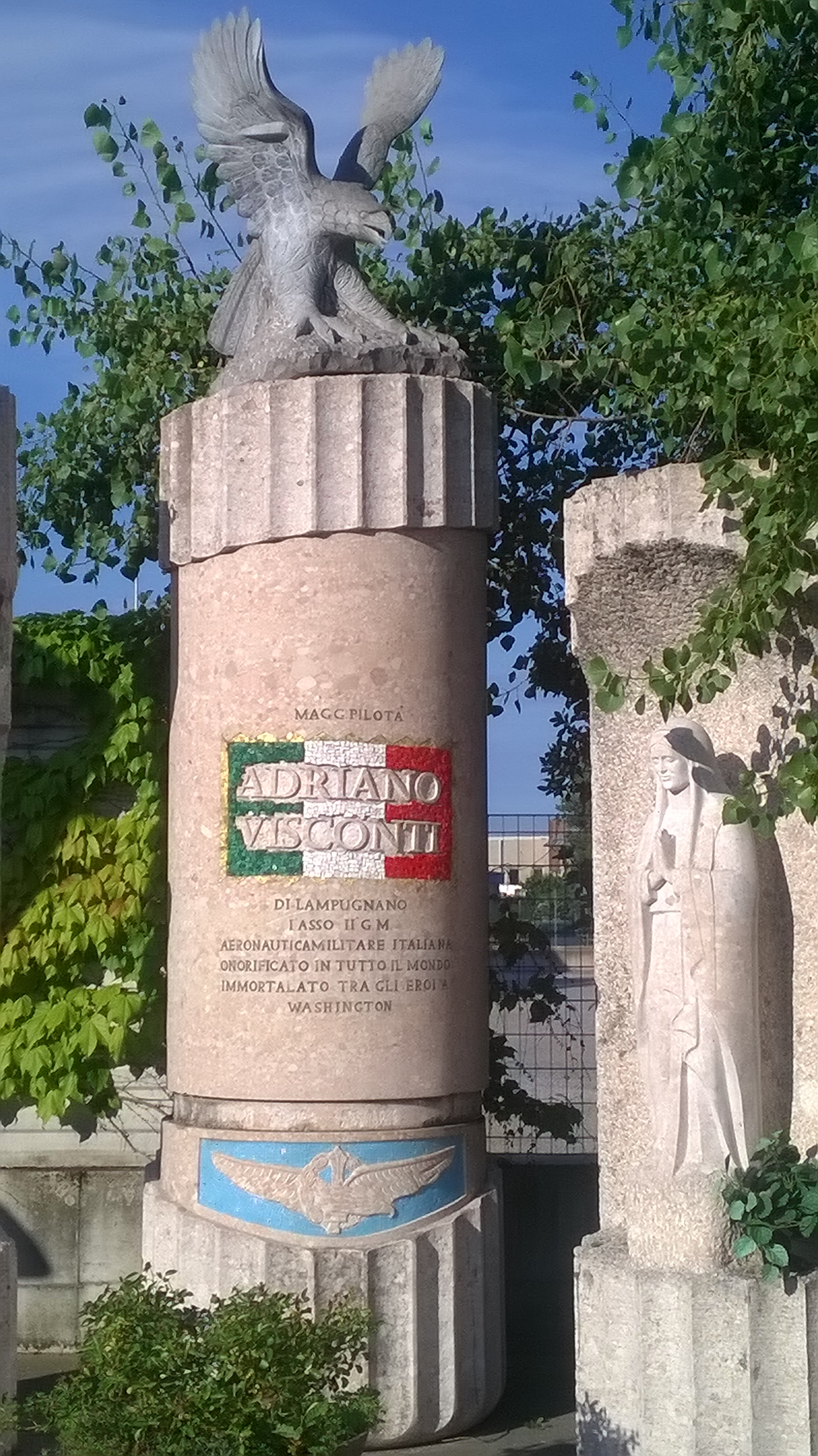
Monument to Adriano Visconti

On April 29, 1945, Visconti surrendered to communist partisans near Malpensa airfield, Milan, only after he was assured that none of the air or ground personnel of his unit would be killed in retaliatory attacks. His safety was assured by the mayor of Milan as well, when he was first taken for interrogation.

Visconti and the other officers were taken on two buses to the barracks of the Regiment "Savoia Cavalleria" in via Vincenzo Monti. The barracks was then the command of National Republican Guard Intendancy (Intendenza della Guardia Nazionale Repubblicana). There, at 2 p.m., Visconti and Lieutenant Valerio Stefanini, his close collaborator, were seemingly taken for a routine interrogation. They were both shot in the back by a Russian bodyguard of the communist partisan leader "Iso" (Aldo Aniasi).

The Russian was charged with murder but was later discharged because the crime had occurred before 8 May 1945, the official end of the war in Italy, and was therefore considered an act of war. Visconti and Stefanini were initially hastily buried in the courtyard of the "Savoia Cavalleria" barracks. In May 1945, a group of fellow aviators and friends, including Giuseppe Robetto, Ugo Diappi, Luigi Botto and Irma Rachelli, arranged for the bodies to be moved to Cimitero Monumentale di Milano.

== See also ==
- List of World War II aces from Italy

== Bibliography ==
- D'Amico, Ferdinando and Valentini, Gabriele. "L'uomo che abbattè Visconti" - issue n.3 - March 1989 of "JP4 Aeronautica".
- Beale, Nick, D'Amico, Ferdinando and Valentini, Gabriele. Air War Italy, Axis Air Forces from Liberation of Rome to the Surrender. Shrewsbury, UK: Airlife, 1996. ISBN 1-85310-252-0.
- Massimello, Giovanni and Apostolo, Giorgio. Italian Aces of World War 2; Osprey Aircraft of the Aces 34. Botley, Oxford UK: Osprey Publishing, 2000. ISBN 1-84176-078-1
- Pesce, Giuseppe con Giovanni Massimello. Adriano Visconti Asso di guerra. Parma: Albertelli Edizioni speciali s.r.l. 1997
