= Covre =

Covre is an Italian surname. Notable people with the surname include:

- Alessandro Covre (died 1951), Italian wrestler
- Giuseppe Covre (1950–2020), Italian politician
- Tullio Covre (1917–1961), Italian flying ace
