= Oscar Di Giamberardino =

Italian admiral (1881–1960)

- Born: 12 November 1881; Torre de' Passeri, Kingdom of Italy
- Died: 10 November 1960 (aged 78); Rome, Italy
- Military career
- Allegiance: Kingdom of Italy
- Branch: Regia Marina
- Service years: 1903-1951
- Rank: Vice Admiral
- Commands: 48 OS (torpedo boat); Pola (heavy cruiser); Zara (heavy cruiser); 8th Naval Division
- Conflicts: Italo-Turkish War; World War I; Adriatic campaign; Italian invasion of Albania; World War II
- Awards: Silver Medal of Military Valor; Bronze Medal of Military Valor; Military Order of Italy; Order of the Crown of Italy; Order of Saints Maurice and Lazarus

Oscar Di Giamberardino (12 November 1881, in Torre de' Passeri – 10 November 1960, in Rome) was an Italian admiral during the interwar period and World War II. Along with Admirals Giuseppe Fioravanzo and Romeo Bernotti, he was considered one of the foremost "intellectuals" of the Royal Italian Navy during the 1930s.

== Biography ==
He was born in Torre de' Passeri, province of Pescara, on 12 November 1881. In 1899 he was admitted to the Royal Naval Academy of Livorno, graduating in 1903 with the rank of ensign. After serving on various capital ships, in 1911-1912 he participated, with the rank of lieutenant, in the Italo-Turkish War aboard the armored cruiser Francesco Ferruccio and the protected cruisers Puglia and Elba.

When the Kingdom of Italy entered World War I, on 24 May 1915, he took part in the defense of Grado, and later served on the destroyer Indomito and then, as executive officer, on the flotilla leader Cesare Rossarol. In 1917 he took command of the torpedo boat 48 OS, distinguishing himself in numerous missions along the enemy coast in the northern Adriatic Sea, for which he was awarded a Silver Medal and a Bronze Medal of Military Valor. After the end of the war, having been promoted to lieutenant commander, he was assigned to the newly established naval command of Dalmatia and then to that of the naval base of Pola, and between 1923 and 1924 he was at the Maritime War Institute of Livorno. On 3 March 1922, when Fascist squads overthrew the government of the Free State of Fiume, Di Giamberardino was among the commanding officers of the local Italian naval garrison; he did not interfere with the putsch, which forced President Riccardo Zanella into exile and led to the eventual annexation of Fiume by Italy with the Treaty of Rome. An enquiry was opened into his behaviour, but he was absolved of any wrongdoing.

From 1925 to 1927, with the rank of commander, he was naval attaché in Germany and then in Poland, after which he returned to the Institute of Maritime Warfare as assistant teacher of the courses for the next two years. After promotion to captain in 1931, he was assigned to the Army War School in Turin, after which he commanded heavy cruisers Pola and Zara, while also fulfilling the task Chief of Staff of the 1st Fleet. He was promoted to rear admiral in 1936 and to vice admiral at the end of the same year, and given command of the 8th Naval Division, with flag on the light cruiser Luigi di Savoia Duca degli Abruzzi. In April 1939 he participated in the Italian invasion of Albania, in command of the naval group tasked with the landing and capture of Sarande. After the armistice with France in June 1940, he was appointed head of the Central Naval Commission of Armistice with France. In 1941 he was placed in auxiliary position due to reaching age limits, but he was temporarily recalled to service for war necessities in October 1942, being then dispensed from it in December 1944. He retired from active service in 1951, and was placed on absolute leave due to age limits in 1954. He died in Rome on November 10, 1960.

== Activity as an intellectual and writer ==
Di Giamberardino wrote over a dozen books about naval history and strategy over the course of his career; in 1933 he received the 2nd class silver medal for two of his works, Il fascismo e gli ideali di Roma, which through an examination of Roman history studied the maritime vocation of Italy, and Politica marittima, an analytical examination of Italian naval policy. Following in the path of Admiral Guido Po, Di Giamberardino held a series of lectures about naval strategy at the Institute of Maritime Warfare, later collected in the volume L'arte della guerra in mare, in which he outlined the main task that the Regia Marina would have in the coming war, protection of supply convoys in the context of a war for the dominance over maritime communications. His vision, marked by realism, did not hide the impossibility of defending the most important trade lines of the Mediterranean Sea where the likely enemy, Great Britain, was in control of the key positions, advising a defensive policy as the only possible course of action. L'arte della guerra in mare, in the revised edition of 1958, was translated into French and Spanish. Other noteworthy works are La Marina nella tragedia nazionale, published in 1947, and L'arte della guerra (Kriegskunst in unserer Zeit), published posthumously in 1961, in German.

Among the intellectuals of the Regia Marina, Di Giamberardino was considered as the leading figure of the "old school", opposed to Bernotti and Fioravanzo who led the "new school". Di Giamberardino supported the concept of the "decisive battle" between capital ships, whereas Fioravanzo was a proponent of a larger use of light vessels and submarines. During the 1930s Di Giamberardino was also among the opponents of the construction of aircraft carriers, which he considered as too vulnerable, along with Angelo Iachino and Luigi Sansonetti, whereas Bernotti, Fioravanzo and Francesco Maugeri supported the idea.

After World War II, Di Giamberardino continued writing about naval strategy in the context of the Cold War, whose onset he had foreseen at the end of World War II, discussing the role navies could play in the aftermath of a mutual nuclear strike. He was among the proponents of a European Federation with unified armed forces.
