= Aldo Pellegrini =

Aldo Pellegrini may refer to:

- Aldo Pellegrini (general) (1888–1940), Italian general
- Aldo Pellegrini (poet) (1903–1973), Argentine poet, essayist and art critic
