= Romeo Bernotti =

Italian admiral (1877–1974)

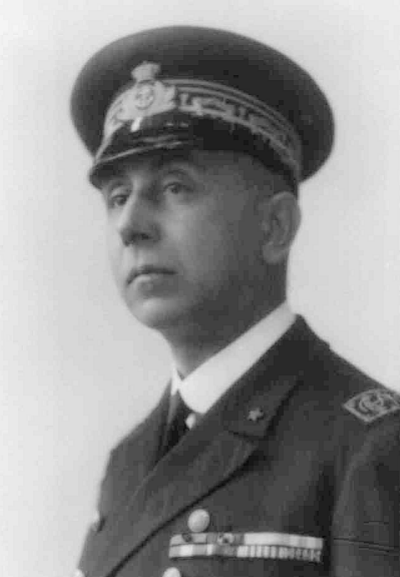
- Born: 24 February 1877; Marciana Marina, Kingdom of Italy
- Died: 19 March 1974 (aged 97); Rome, Italy
- Military career
- Allegiance: Kingdom of Italy
- Branch: Regia Marina
- Rank: Fleet Admiral
- Commands: 2nd Naval Division; Italian Naval Academy; Northern Tyrrhenian Sea Naval Department; 2nd Fleet
- Conflicts: Italo-Turkish War; World War I; Adriatic campaign; World War II
- Awards: Bronze Medal of Military Valor; War Merit Cross; Order of the Crown of Italy; Order of Saints Maurice and Lazarus

Romeo Bernotti (Marciana Marina, 24 February 1877 – Rome, 19 March 1974) was an Italian admiral. Along with Admirals Giuseppe Fioravanzo and Oscar Di Giamberardino, he was considered one of the main "intellectuals" of the Royal Italian Navy during the interwar years. He was also a member of the Italian Senate.

== Biography ==
He participated in the Italo-Turkish War (1911–1912) with the rank of Lieutenant, in command of torpedo boats. During the First World War he was commander of destroyers and scout cruisers, earning a Bronze Medal of Military Valor; after the war he served at the Livorno Naval Academy and at the Naval Warfare Institute from 1919 to 1922, with the rank of Commander and later Captain. After promotion to Rear Admiral, he was deputy chief of staff of the Regia Marina from 21 December 1927 to 5 October 1929 (being promoted to Vice Admiral in November 1928), after which he became commander of the 2nd Naval Division (with light cruiser Ancona as flagship) until 16 July 1931.

He was president of the cruiser testing commission from 17 July 1931 to 5 February 1932, and commander of the Naval Academy of Livorno from 1932 to 1934. He became Admiral on 2 June 1934, and from 6 November 1934 to 25 September 1935 he held the position of commander-in-chief of the Naval Department of the Northern Tyrrhenian Sea. After a short period as vice-president of the Naval High Council, he assumed command in chief of the 2nd Fleet, which he left on 10 February 1938. On 30 April 1938, while retaining the post of president of the Naval High Council, he was appointed president of the Admirals’ Committee.

Bernotti was a prolific author of books and articles on naval doctrine; during the 1920s and 1930s he was one of the leading theorists of the Royal Italian Navy and a staunch proponent of naval aviation and the use of aircraft carriers. In 1922 he was the first director of the Maritime Warfare Institute. As early as in 1923, he pointed out the decisive strategic advantage that could be reached by attacking enemy battleships at anchor in port with aircraft. In 1927 he wrote to the head of the government, Benito Mussolini, lamenting the uselessness and waste of economic, material and human resources deriving from the "Battleship Policy".

In 1939 he retired from active service and became a Senator of the Kingdom of Italy. He was promoted to Fleet Admiral in June 1940 and briefly recalled into service in September, being assigned to the Commissione Italiana d'Armistizio con la Francia for a month.

He died in Rome in 1974, aged 97.
