= Italian Air Force (disambiguation) =

The Italian Air Force has gone under different names in different periods:

- Regia Aeronautica (Royal Air Force), from 1923 to June 1946
- Aeronautica Nazionale Repubblicana, the air force of Italian Social Republic during World War II
- Italian Co-Belligerent Air Force, formed in October 1943 whose pilots flew with the Allies
- Aeronautica Militare, after World War II
