= Luigi Gatti =

Luigi Gatti may refer to:

- Luigi Gatti (composer) (1740–1817), Italian composer
- Luigi Gatti (restaurateur) (1875–1912), Italian businessman and restaurateur
- Luigi Gatti (weightlifter), Italian weightlifter in 1920 Summer Olympics
- Luigi Gatti (politician) (1913–1945), Italian politician
- Luigi Gatti (nuncio) (born 1946), Italian prelate and diplomat
