= Pietro Pintor =

Italian general (1880–1940)

Pietro Pintor (c. 1940)

Pietro Pintor (20 May 1880 – 7 December 1940) was an Italian general during World War II. Pintor was the uncle of the antifascist journalist Giaime Pintor.

During the Italian invasion of France (11–25 June), he commanded the First Army, which was deployed along the southern sector of the Alps down to the coast. The first ten days of after Italy's declaration of war on France passed without any offensive movements by the Italians, and Pintor labelled it a "war without hostilities". On 20 June, he told Army Chief of Staff Mario Roatta that his army was "absolutely unprepared" for the offensive Prime Minister Benito Mussolini had demanded by the next morning. Mussolini, in response to Pintor, modified his plans, calling for a total offensive only along the northern stretch of the Alpine front. Afterwards, he was the president of the Commissione Italiana d'Armistizio con la Francia (CIAF), which oversaw the implementation of the Franco-Italian Armistice, from 27 June 1940 until his death.

On 28 June, Pintor chaired the first general meeting of the Armistice Commission, where he created four sub-commissions to deal with general matters and matters pertaining specifically to the army, navy and air force. Although he realised early that the British Empire would not capitulate to the Axis, he faithfully executed Mussolini's policy with respect to France. After the removal of Pietro Badoglio as chief of staff of the armed forces in November, Pintor was briefly considered as his replacement, but Mussolini found him "too slow and doctrinaire" and Roberto Farinacci exclaimed that "Pintor is Badoglio—only worse". In December, shortly before his death, Pintor issued a circular confirming that military officers of the CIAF were ufficiali di complemento in congedo ("reserve officers on unlimited discharge") and permitted to wear civilian clothing.

Pintor and fellow general Aldo Pellegrini died when their airplane crashed near Acqui Terme on its way from Rome to the CIAF headquarters in Turin. After his death at age sixty, the Istituto Superiore di Guerra published a twenty-five page biographical pamphlet, Il generale Pietro Pintor, 1880–1940: Cenni biografici, in 1941.

== Sources ==
- "2 Italian Generals Die In Mystery Air Crash". The Straits Times. Singapore. 9 December 1940. p. 9.
- Grillère, Diane (2010). "L'occupation italienne en France de 1940 à 1943: Administration, souveraineté, rivalités". Diacronie: Studi di Storia Contemporanea. 4 (3): 1–19.
- Jowett, Philip S. (2000). The Italian Army 1940–45 (1): Europe 1940–1943. Osprey.
- Knox, MacGregor (1982). Mussolini Unleashed, 1939–1941: Politics and Strategy in Fascist Italy's Last War. Cambridge University Press.
- Rodogno, Davide (2006). Fascism's European Empire: Italian Occupation During the Second World War. Cambridge University Press.
- Sica, Emanuele (2011). Italiani Brava Gente? The Italian Occupation of Southeastern France in the Second World War, 1940–1943 (PhD thesis). University of Waterloo.
- Vittoria, Albertina (2007). "Una "Grande muraglia di libri fra me e i mongoli": Sulla biografia di Giaime Pintor". Studi Storici. 48 (4): 965–92.
