= Castello Gizzi =

Coordinates: 42.2436°N 13.9269°E

Gizzi Castle
- Castello Gizzi
- Torre de' Passeri
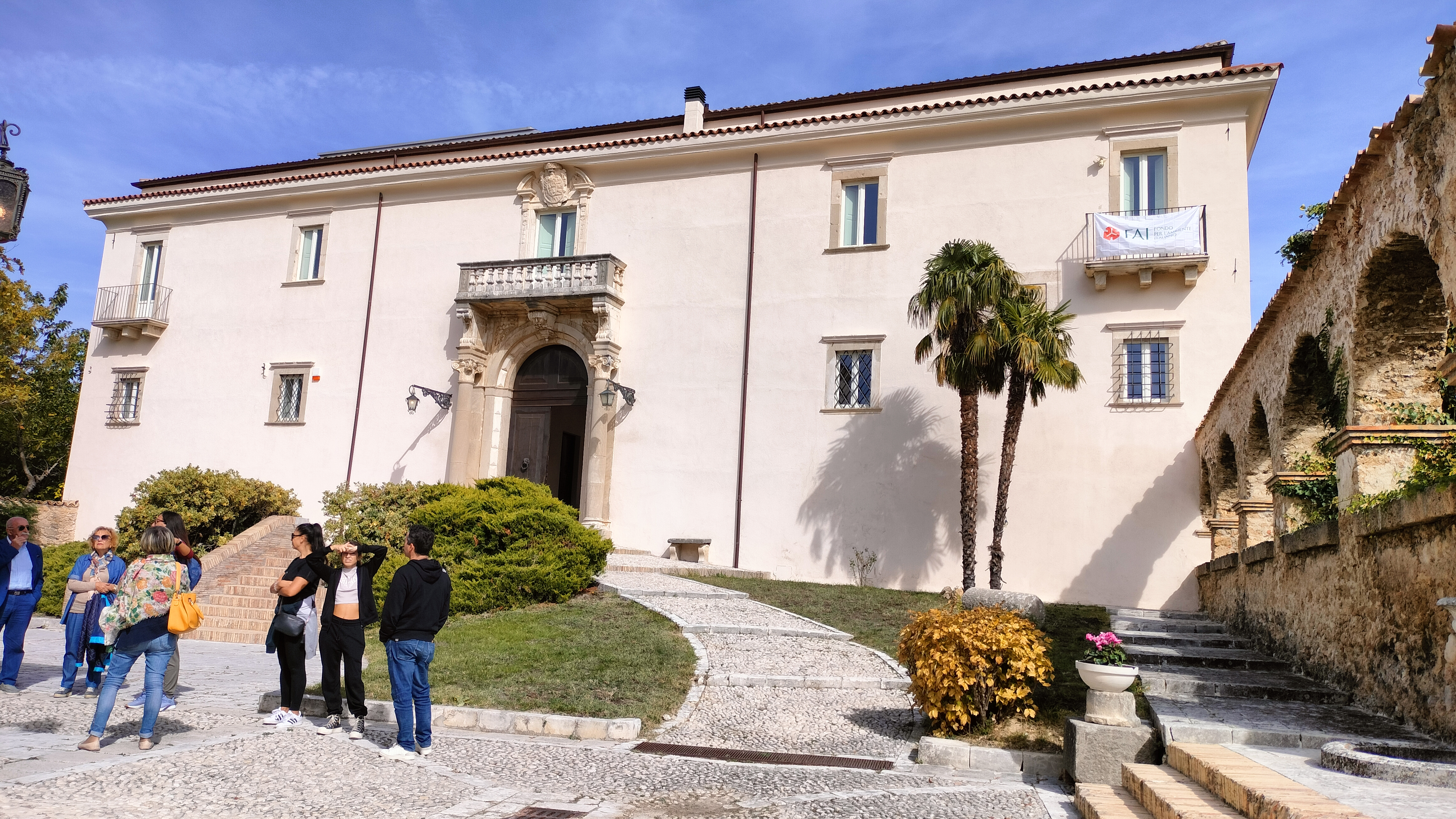
- Castle in Torre de' Passeri

Site information
- Type: Castle

Location

Site history
- Built: 18th century

Castello Gizzi (Italian for Gizzi Castle) is a fortified palace in Torre de' Passeri, Province of Pescara (Abruzzo). Gizzi Castle was built around the tower of the passageway (which gave its name to the place) and has now been completely renovated.

== History ==
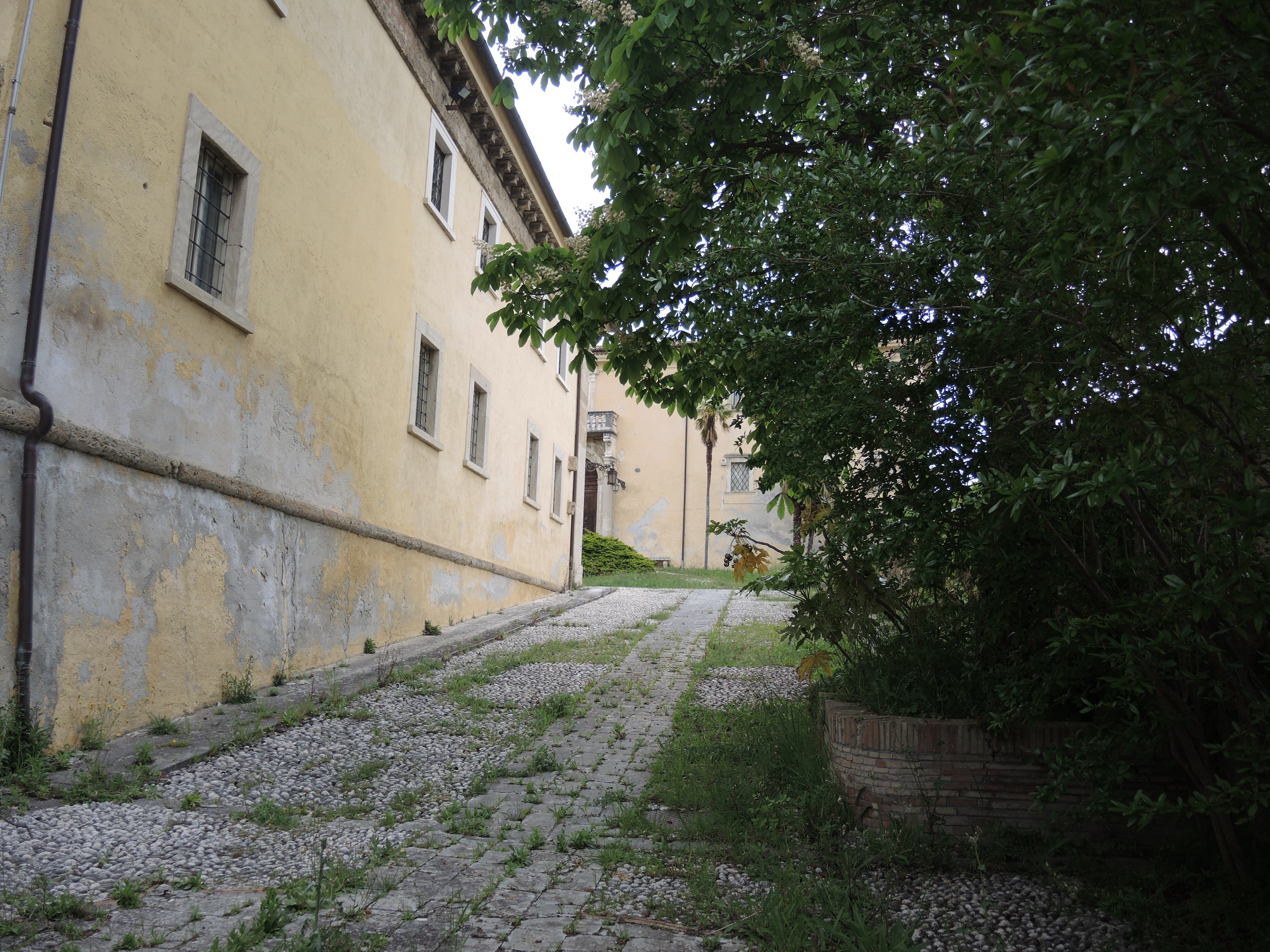
Access road

The castle was built in 1719 by the Marquise Smeralda Mazara of Sulmona on the remains of a 12th-century defense tower of the Abbey of San Clemente a Casauria.

In 1967, the castle passed from the Mazara family to the Gizzi family. In 1979, it became the headquarters of the Institute of Studies and Research "Casa di Dante in Abruzzo" founded by Corrado Gizzi, as well as the Dante Museum "F. Bellonzi" and the library "M. A. Caldora".

== Architecture ==
The castle consists of a complex formed by the main building, a dépendance, a cellar, and an 8-hectare park. The main building has four floors. The main facade features a stone portal topped by a balcony, above which is the Mazara family crest.

Next to the facade are five medieval arches, and in the courtyard in front of the castle, there is a 4th-century BC sarcophagus and remains of imperial-era columns.
