= Ildebrando Goiran =

Italian admiral

- Born: 14 June 1882; Turin, Kingdom of Italy
- Died: 16 November 1945 (aged 63); Rome, Kingdom of Italy
- Military career
- Allegiance: Kingdom of Italy
- Branch: Regia Marina
- Service years: 1898-1945
- Rank: Admiral
- Commands: Re Umberto (steamer); 33 PN (torpedo boat); 42 PN (torpedo boat); MAS 9 (motor torpedo boat); Lake Garda Flotilla; Faà di Bruno (armed pontoon); Benedetto Cairoli (destroyer); Quarto (scout cruiser); Sardinia Naval Command; La Maddalena Naval Fortress Area; 4th Naval Division; Sicily Naval Command; Northern Tyrrhenian Naval Department
- Conflicts: Italo-Turkish War; First Italo-Senussi War; World War I; Adriatic Campaign of World War I; Second Italo-Ethiopian War; World War II
- Awards: Gold Medal of Military Valor; War Cross of Military Valor; War Merit Cross; Order of the Crown of Italy; Order of Saints Maurice and Lazarus

Ildebrando Goiran (14 June 1882 in Turin – 16 November 1945 in Rome) was an Italian admiral and recipient of the Gold Medal of Military Valor.

== Biography ==
=== Early years ===
He was born in Turin on June 14, 1882, the son of Army officer and Senator Giovanni Goiran and Irma Lazzarini. After attending the Nunziatella Military School, in August 1898 he entered the Royal Naval Academy of Livorno, graduating as ensign in April 1902. His first assignment was on the battleship Emanuele Filiberto. In November 1905 he was promoted to sub-lieutenant and in 1910 to lieutenant. He participated in the Italo-Turkish War, initially on board the protected cruiser Etruria, then on the torpedo cruiser Caprera and finally, as military commander, on the chartered steamer Re Umberto. During the war he distinguished himself in the summer of 1912, when he was designated as beach commander in Misrata in Tripolitania, and then in the spring of 1913 (after the end of the hostilities with the Ottoman Empire and during the campaign against the Senussi), on the occasion of the landing in Tolmeta in Cyrenaica.

=== World War I ===
After a short period in Rome as section head of the Regia Marina's general staff office, in the summer of 1914 he was assigned on the destroyer Impetuoso, where he was at the time of the entry of the Kingdom of Italy into World War I, which took place on May 24, 1915. At the beginning of 1916 he was in command of the torpedo boat 33 PN for a month, before being reassigned to Impetuoso as executive officer. In June 1916 he became commander of the torpedo boat 42 PN and, while in Venice, he was made aware of a project that Captain Carlo Pignatti Morano was working on with the authorization of Admiral Paolo Thaon di Revel, aimed at forcing of the port of Pola, the main base of the Austro-Hungarian fleet, in order to attack the ships moored there. More specifically, Pignatti Morano had planned to enter the Fasana channel, just north of Pola, between the Istrian coast and the Brioni islands, where one or two of the enemy capital ships stationed in Pola were stationed, usually in turn; despite the presence of coastal batteries and destroyers, it would have been easier to attack them while they were at anchor in the channel, rather than in the port of Pola. After a series of experiments conducted in Venice, it was decided to send three ships into the channel: destroyer Zeffiro, torpedo boat 9 PN (equipped with a device that would lower the northern booms that blocked access to the channel), and MAS 20, specifically fitted with a pair of electric thrusters to allow silent navigation. 9 PN would tow MAS 20 till near the entrance of the channel, with Zeffiro providing escort and support; the MAS would then enter the channel and attack the Austro-Hungarian vessels with her torpedoes. Goiran was chosen to command MAS 20; in the late afternoon of 1 November 1916 the three vessels sailed from Venice, reaching the entrance of the Fasana channel around midnight on November 2. MAS 20 passed the obstructions and started searching at a slow motion, using the electric motors; Goiran spotted SMS Mars and attacked her with two torpedoes fired from 400 meters, which however became entangled in the torpedo nets. The Italian vessels then withdrew undamaged.

In December 1916 Goiran was promoted to lieutenant commander for war merit and awarded the Silver Medal of Military Valor, which was subsequently changed to a Gold Medal. From February to July 1917 he was in service with the anti-aircraft defense of Venice and then he was in command of the Lake Garda flotilla, of the armed pontoon Faà di Bruno and of the destroyer Benedetto Cairoli, before being again assigned to the anti-aircraft defense of Venice. At the end of May 1918 he was appointed commander of the MAS squadron operating from Trapani and then of the one based in Ancona, being decorated with the War Merit Cross and then with the War Cross for Military Valor. After the end of hostilities he was given command of the MAS squadron based in Pola.

=== Interwar years ===
In November 1919 he was promoted to Commander and appointed executive officer of the armored cruiser San Marco; in March 1920 he was transferred to the battleship Conte di Cavour, again as executive officer, and in December he was assigned to the maritime defense of Venice, also carrying out a mission in Fiume in the following months. In May 1923 he was appointed commander of the MAS squadron of the naval forces of the Mediterranean, in December 1924 he was commander of a destroyer squadron (with Nicola Fabrizi as flagship), in November 1925 he took over the direction of the naval mechanic's school in Venice and in April 1926 he was promoted to captain. In April 1928 he became commander of the scout cruiser Quarto and from 1929 he was in command of a squadron of Indomito-class destroyers.

In 1931 he became chief of staff of the 2nd Fleet, embarked on the battleship Andrea Doria and later on the light cruiser Giovanni delle Bande Nere. In January 1933 he was promoted to rear admiral and appointed naval commander of Sardinia and of the La Maddalena Naval Fortress Area. In 1935 he was promoted to vice admiral and for a short time he was put at disposal of the Ministry of the Navy. During the Second Italo-Ethiopian War he was commander of the 4th Naval Division, and in October 1936 he became naval commander of Sicily. In April 1937 he was promoted to admiral and on the following month became vice president of the High Council of the Navy. In January 1938 he became commander in chief of the Northern Tyrrhenian Naval Department and in March 1940 he assumed the presidency of the High Council of the Navy.

=== World War II and later years ===
After the Armistice of Villa Incisa following Italy's brief campaign against France in June 1940, right after its entry into World War II, Goiran was appointed naval delegate in the Commissione Italiana d'Armistizio con la Francia. In June 1941 he was again appointed commander-in-chief of the Northern Tyrrhenian Naval Department until November, when he was placed at the disposal of the Ministry of the Navy. He then returned to the position of President of the High Council of the Navy from October 1942 until the Armistice of Cassibile in September 1943. Afterwards, he did not collaborate with the authorities of the Italian Social Republic and in August 1944, after the liberation of Rome, he was part of the commission tasked with investigating into officers who had been guilty of collaborationism.

He died in Rome on November 16, 1945.
