= Giuseppe Fioravanzo =

Italian admiral

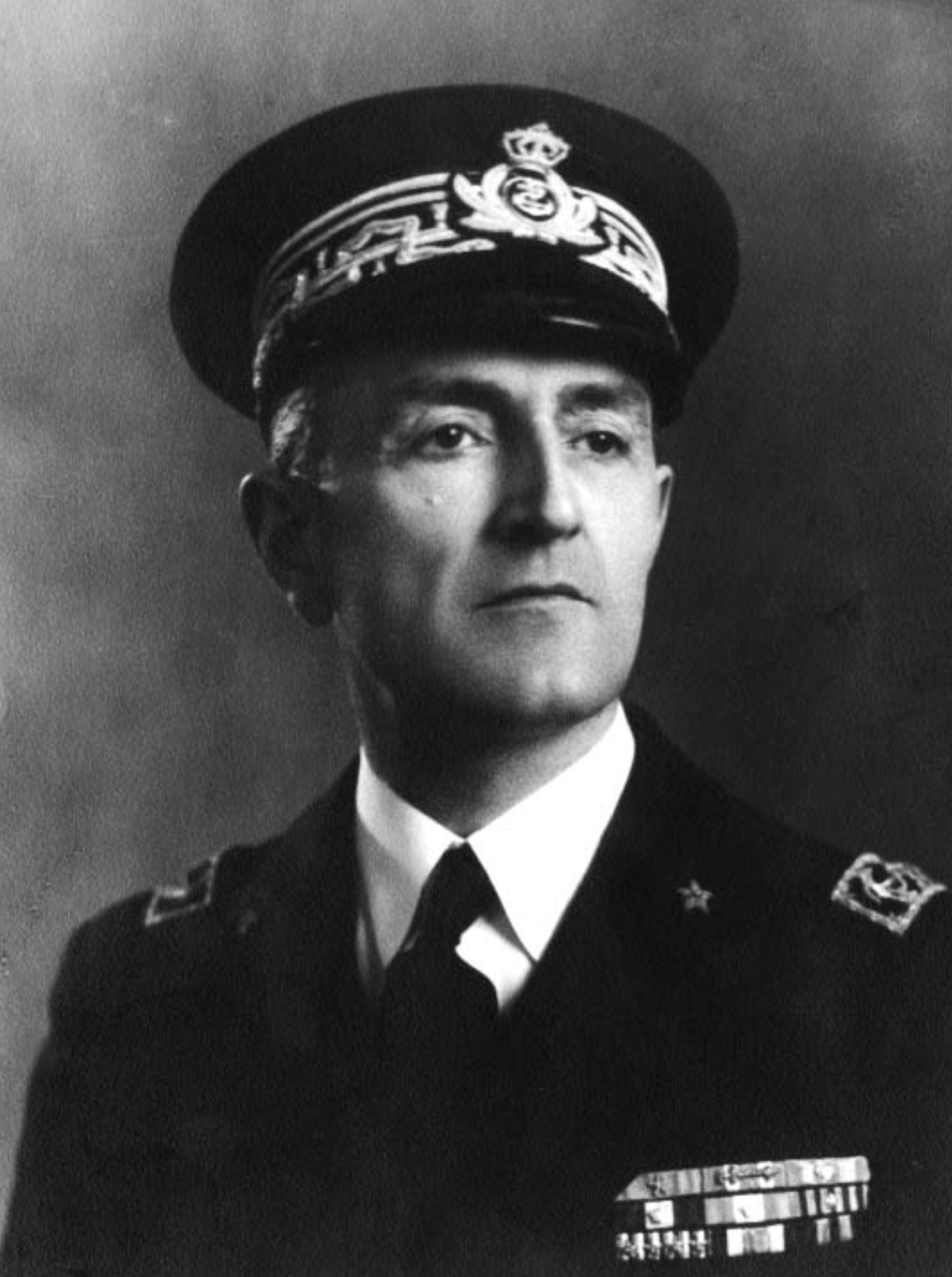
- Born: 14 August 1891; Monselice (Padua)
- Died: 18 March 1975 (aged 83); Rome
- Military career
- Allegiance: Kingdom of Italy; Italy
- Branch: Regia Marina; Italian Navy
- Service years: 1912–1959
- Rank: Ammiraglio di Squadra (Vice Admiral)
- Unit: 97/bis battery
- Commands: Calliope torpedo boat, Armando Diaz light cruiser, Regia Marina Staff, 9 Naval Division, 5 Naval Division, 8th Naval Division, Taranto military commander and prefect.
- Conflicts: Italo-Turkish War, First World War, Spanish Civil War, Second World War, Battle of Cape Matapan (1941), Battle of Mid-June (1942), Italian Campaign.
- Awards: Silver Medal of Military Valor, Croce di Guerra (twice), Commemorative Italian-Austrian war medal, Inter-allied Victory medal, Medal of the Unification of Italy, Military Order of Italy, Order of Merit of the Italian Republic
- Other work: author, historian, director of Italian Navy Historical Office

Giuseppe Fioravanzo (14 August 1891 – 18 March 1975) was an Italian admiral. He was considered one of the main "intellectuals" of the Regia Marina; together with admirals Bernotti and Di Giamberardino he was one of the main authors of the development of Italian naval doctrine between the two World Wars. After serving with distinction in the Italo-Turkish War and the First World War, from the 1920s he started his activity as a naval theorist and writer besides continuing his military career. During the Second World War, having been promoted to Divisional Admiral, he held important commitments, both operational and related to General Staff. After the war he directed the Historical Office of the Italian Navy for many years.

== Early career ==
He was born in Monselice, a town about 20 km southeast of Padua in north-east Italy, although the family, of noble heritage, hailed from Florence.

He entered the Italian Naval Academy in 1909 and graduated as a guardiamarina (Sub-lieutenant) in 1912.

He was still a cadet when he participated in the Italo-Turkish War aboard the battleship Benedetto Brin.

== First World War ==
He took part to the First World War in the northern Adriatic Sea in the Raggruppamento Marina (Navy Group). The first nucleus of the Group was formed by crewmen of the cruiser Amalfi after its sinking in July 1915. The crew manned gun batteries of mixed calibers that engaged the enemy on the sea frontline.

Fioravanzo commanded one of the 152-mm batteries and distinguished himself, along with a fellow soldier equal in rank named Parona, on 15 and 16 May 1916 in engaging Austrian-Hungarian forces near Duino and hindering their advance towards Monfalcone. In July Fioravanzo's battery (numbered 97 bis) was transferred near Monfalcone to be deployed against Monte San Michele for use in the planned battle for the conquest of Gorizia. Later on it was moved back to Punta Sdobba.

== Inter-war years ==
After the First World War, in 1921, Fioravanzo was assigned for some time to the Navy military command of the city of Pola (now Pula, Croatia).

In 1923, after advancing to senior officer status he took command of the torpedo boat Calliope, an old vessel of the Pegaso class, with which he was sent to the Dodecanese to protect Italian interests threatened by tensions between ethnic Greeks and Turks.

At the same time Fioravanzo began to publish his articles in the Rivista Marittima (Maritime Magazine) as well as his first books of naval theory, in so doing becoming one of the most promising officers of the Navy. He was among those Navy officers who supported the idea that the Italian Navy should build and deploy aircraft carriers of its own.

He then served as a subaltern on the newly commissioned cruiser Trieste, and subsequently he assumed command of the destroyer Freccia and of the related 7 torpedo boat squadron.

During the Second Italo-Abyssinian War, which resulted in a serious political crisis between Italy and Great Britain, Fioravanzo was Chief of Staff of the Commander-in-Chief of the Reunited Naval Forces, a body set up in September 1935 to give a framework of homogeneity for the employment and command criteria of the two squadrons into which the Italian Navy was then divided – this at a time when a clash with Great Britain seemed inevitable.

From 14 January to 12 October 1936 he was in charge of the light cruiser Armando Diaz and in that same year he took over the Naval Command School and the destroyer Aquila, head of a set of three torpedo boat squadrons which were affiliated with the school.

The School command, in addition to its institutional role of preparing promising ship captains for promotion to higher ranks, also had the secondary task of participating in the control of the Strait of Sicily. In this function Commander Fioravanzo also played a role in blockading the Strait to prevent USSR-shipped supplies from reaching Republican-held ports in Spain.

== World War II ==
When Italy entered World War II on 10 June 1940, Fioravanzo was promoted to Contrammiraglio (Counter-Admiral). During the course of the war he was a Staff member until March 1942, when his assignments became of a mostly operational nature. In the meantime he had advanced to the rank of Ammiraglio di Divisione (Divisional Admiral).

During his early period at Rome, in the Staff, Fioravanzo had the function of assistant Admiral in the Supermarina war room. He was able to follow the course of operations directly, along with other assistant admirals who rotated around the clock. Thus he oversaw all the operations in which the Italian Navy was involved during the first twenty months of war, including, together with Admirals Ferreri and De Courten, Operation Gaudo, that led to the Battle of Cape Matapan.

Above all Fioravanzo was responsible for the Navy Department of Special Studies: the actual "study office" of the then Regia Marina. As such Fioravanzo studied most projects of Navy "special operations" and the related deployment of forces. He was the one who, well before the war, devised the first draft of the plan for the forthcoming invasion of Malta, dubbed Operation C3. The Department of Special Studies was concerned not only in projects, but also in the rewriting of tactical regulations, of operational statistics, of the writing of articles for magazines and newsletters, and of propaganda (via radio also).

Among Fioravanzo's most important tasks and initiatives it is worth mentioning that in May 1941, he collaborated with Regia Aeronautica Generals Cappa and Mattei to write a series of norms aimed at easing the cooperation between the Navy and the Air Force, until that time very poor, and to create and publish the so-called "blue bulletin" that, every two weeks, updated operational commands on the activity of Italian and British Navy Forces during the previous fortnight; moreover, the Admiral added his own critical remarks to the description of the most significant actions.

The joint Navy-Air Force study had been encouraged by Chief of Staff Ugo Cavallero who in fact used admiral Fioravanzo, Army General Antonio Gandin (who would later be executed at Cephallonia) and Air Force General Mattei like a full-blown inter-forces commission. In Cavallero's aims, the study was meant to elaborate the so-called mass action against the British Mediterranean Fleet, necessary to acquire the supremacy at least in the central Mediterranean Sea in view of a decisive offensive towards Egypt. The plan was never carried out if not partially, but there is little doubt that this study inspired positively the later strategy of the Italian Navy.

On 25 March 1942 he moved aboard ship to take command of the 9th Naval Division, which consisted of the Littorio-class battleships. The first combat action in which he participated was the contrast to British Operation Vigorous, which goal was to take a supply convoy from Alexandria, Egypt to Malta. This action took place in the wider naval clashed known as the Battle of Mid-June or Operation Harpoon and Fioravanzo participated on orders from Admiral Angelo Iachino, the higher commander at sea. The action of the 9th Division, together with that of the 3rd and 8th Division, forced the British to abandon the mission with no ballistic contact between the two sides.

In January 1943 the Italian fleet was reorganized and Fioravanzo, on 6 January, left the command of the 9th Division and the following day he took the lead of the 5th Division formed by the old refurbished battleships of the Conte di Cavour and Andrea Doria classes. It was a purely "platonic" command: the refurbished battleships were in a reserve position, had no fuel and their operational deployment was not planned, and at any rate it had to be ruled out even for the 9th Division battleships, since the trend of the war was by then unfavorable for Italy.

On 14 March 1943 he became the leader of the 8th Naval Division, replacing Admiral Raffaele de Courten. In this capacity he was ordered to shell Palermo, which had fallen into the hands of the Allies some days before. This brought a negative turn in Fioravanzo's career: due to the anticipated return of the Division without accomplishing the mission, Supermarina (the Regia Marina High Command) decided to leave him ashore and replace him with Admiral Luigi Biancheri. The disembarkement and the loss of the leading position made it impossible for Fioravanzo to be promoted to Vice Admiral though remaining in active service. In practice, his career was over. Paradoxically, he was decorated with the Croce di Guerra for that action.

The mission began on the evening of 6 August 1943 when the Admiral, set sail from Genoa towards La Maddalena (Sardinia) with the Division formed by light cruisers Giuseppe Garibaldi and Emanuele Filiberto Duca d'Aosta. In the evening of the next day, the Division left La Maddalena bound for Palermo, where the Allied ships were riding at anchor. Garibaldi, however, had engine troubles and therefore could not develop more than 28 knots of speed. Furthermore, neither cruiser was equipped with radar.

The sighting by the aerial reconnaissance of unknown ships en route towards 8th Division led Fioravanzo to consider that he was going to clash with an Allied naval force under conditions of sharp inferiority. Considering the risk of losing two cruisers, but above all the lives of 1,500 crew members without being able to cause significant damage to their opponent, Fioravanzo decided not to complete the mission and sail back to La Spezia although well-aware that this meant the end of his own career.

After the war, it was ascertained through perusal of US archives that USS Philadelphia and USS Savannah were heading towards 8th Division with an escort of destroyers. Thus, retrospectively, Fioravanzo's decision turned out to be the most sensible.

When the Armistice between Italy and Allied armed forces was signed, Fioravanzo was the military commander of the city of Taranto and offered to replace Admiral Alberto Da Zara, in charge of taking the Italian warships to Malta, in case he could not bring himself to do so. Later, during the co-belligerence with the Allies, Fioravanzo was part of the commission tasked with epurating (substituting) Regia Marina personnel who had compromised themselves with Fascism.

== After World War II ==
From 1950 onwards he directed the Navy Historical office. In that period being the head of such office, he was involved in a controversy with journalist Antonino Trizzino, author of the pamphlet Navi e poltrone (Ships and armchairs). In his book Trizzino made accusations against the wartime Navy Staff, going as far as conjecturing that the admirals had betrayed the Italian Navy by favoring the Allied victory. Trizzino's book started the "legend" of a supposedly pro-British Regia Marina. Trizzino was fully acquitted in 1954 by the Milan Court of Appeal. Today, the wartime setbacks encountered by the Italian Navy and Merchant Marine are credited to Ultra, whose role in the Battle of the Mediterranean was made public in the early 1970s. In addition to being the director of the Historical Office, Fioravanzo directed the Rivista Marittima (Maritime Magazine) to which he had been contributing since the 1920s with nearly fifty articles on a wide variety of naval-related subjects.

Fioravanzo left the direction of the Historical Office in 1959, succeeded by Admiral Aldo Cocchia, one of the protagonists of the "battle of convoys". However his work as a naval writer did not come to an end. During the 1960s and early 1970s the Historical Office, which he had directed for nearly ten years, published his works dedicated to naval actions in the Mediterranean and to the organization of the Navy in a series of books on the history of Regia Marina (some of them posthumous). They are mandatory reading for all those who want to deepen their knowledge of history of the Italian Navy in the tragic period of World War II.

Admiral Fioravanzo died in Rome on 18 March 1975. As he requested in his last will, his entire personal archive was donated to the historical archive of the Comune of Monselice.

== Conclusions ==
Through his Admiral status in World War II he contributed to the improvement of the collaboration between Regia Marina and Regia Aeronautica which allowed to operate in a manner more adherent to the reality of the conflict. The air and naval successes of Summer 1942 are also partly due to the effort made by Regia Aeronautica Generals and by himself. He was operatively involved in the Battle of Mid-June as battleships commander; as leader of the 8th Division he was involved in the negative episode of the aborted Palermo shelling which cost him both leadership and career. However correct was his interpretation of the tactical situation, this was acknowledged only later, in retrospect.
From the doctrinal point of view Fioravanzo was an advocate of naval aviation from very early on. His main work was La guerra sul mare e la guerra integrale (War at sea and combined warfare) in which he arrived as far as predicting a real inter-forces strategy. However, when the book was published in 1931, the time was not ripe yet for the Italian military to adopt such a doctrine. His strategical vision consisted of a defensive-active tactic. A smaller Navy like the Regia Marina should have avoided a resolutive clash, instead trying to keep its own communication lines open. Differently from his colleague Di Giamberardino, Fioravanzo never thought that the major naval battle was the key of the strategy; vice versa, one or more naval battles would be sparked only by contrasts on the respective aims - nothing else than traffic operations.

== Promotions ==
- Guardiamarina (1912)
- Sottotenente di Vascello (1914)
- Primo Tenente di Vascello (1916)
- Tenente di Vascello (1918)
- Capitano di corvetta (1923)
- Capitano di fregata (1928)
- Capitano di Vascello (1934)
- Contrammiraglio (1 January 1939)
- Ammiraglio di Divisione (1940)
- Ammiraglio di squadra (1953)

== See also ==
- Military history of Italy during World War II
- Battle of the Mediterranean
- Italian Co-Belligerent Navy
