= Torre de' Passeri =

- Comune
- Comune di Torre de' Passeri
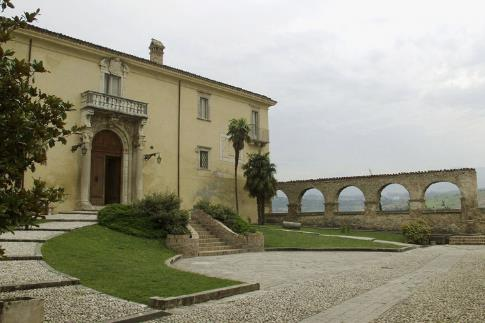
- View of Torre de' Passeri

- Coat of arms

- Location within Italy Location within Abruzzo
- Coordinates: 42°14′N 13°56′E
- Country: Italy
- Region: Abruzzo
- Province: Pescara (PE)

Government
  - Mayor: Antonio Linari

Area
  - Total: 5.93 km^{2} (2.29 sq mi)
- Elevation: 172 m (564 ft)

Population (2007)
  - Total: 3,177
  - Density: 536/km^{2} (1,390/sq mi)
- Demonym: Torresi
- Time zone: UTC+1 (CET)
  - Summer (DST): UTC+2 (CEST)
- Postal code: 65029
- Dialing code: 085
- Patron saint: St. Antoninus Martyr
- Saint day: 3 September

Torre de' Passeri is an Italian town of 3,172 inhabitants in the province of Pescara in Abruzzo. It owes its name to the ancient "Turris Passum" (Torre del passo), a tower located near the Abbey of San Clemente a Casauria. A prominent feature of Torre de' Passeri is Castello Gizzi (called by the locals "Castelluccio"), which overlooks the entire town. Historical-enological researches have suggested that the area might be the native land of the Montepulciano vine. Torre de' Passeri is twinned with Manteigas in Portugal.

== History ==
Torre de' Passeri is located in the territory of Casauria. Its history is closely linked to the Abbey of San Clemente a Casauria; The Chronicon Casauriense (866-1182) is the ancient document to report the existence of the "Villa Bectorrita or Vectorrita" - a name that indicates the presence of a tower on the current area of Torrione, which was incorporated into the lands of the monastery in Torre de' Passeri between the years 873 and 882.

The name "Torre de' Passeri" derives from the ancient "Turris Passum" (Torre del passo). The tower, in fact, stood at the point where the river Pescara was divided into many small rivulets which could be crossed by foot. A night light was lit to facilitate travellers in the crossing, which in return had to pay a toll.

In 1652 Torre de' Passeri became a possession of the Marquises of Sulmona. The Marquise provided construction material and financial support to all the inhabitants who wanted to build a house and to those who wanted to move to the area and start a commercial activity. These aids explain the arrival of some families and potters from Castelli (Teramo), such as the Pompeii, the Antici, the Cappelletti and the Fraticelli, who started the production of the Torrese ceramics, initiating a flourishing industry that lasted until the first decades of the 20th century. Torre de' Passeri thus became the most important economic center of the surrounding area.

== Culture ==
The Palazzo della Memoria, inaugurated on 1 February 2014 in memory of the victims of the 2009 L'Aquila earthquake, is the seat of a few cultural associations and of the Museum of Ancient Arts and Crafts, where it is exhibited evidence of the rural and artisan activities of the village between the 19th and 20th century. The building also hosts a concert hall and a conference and video projection room. The latter was named after Daniela Bortoletti and Martina Di Battista, two young university students who lost their life in L'Aquila during the earthquake.

Scuola della Scuola (home of the primary school) hosts the Regional Library. Ran by the Regional Cultural Promotion Agency, it features more than 5,000 titles, with an adjoining reading room.

== Economy ==
Torre de' Passeri is surrounded by fertile countryside, which produces grapes and wines, especially the Montepulciano d'Abruzzo. Inserted in the wine route "Tremonti" with open cellars for tasting and selling products, the location is considered the native land of the vine and originated the first major production of wines in the area.

== Infrastructures and transport ==
Torre de' Passeri can be reached by car via the former SS5, Via Tiburtina Valeria or by motorway, with the A25 motorway exit directly in the village. Positioned along the Rome-Sulmona-Pescara railway line, the town is also connected by local trains that pass in both directions.

== Sport facilities ==
The Bocciodromo Comunale is a multi-purpose structure designed to host two bowling courts.

The Villa Comunale "150th anniversary of the unification of Italy" is a sport centre. It features the Sports Hall, the Municipal Pool, an indoor soccer pitch and a multipurpose one for tennis and basketball. The "Giuseppe Volpe" Municipal Stadium is a large multi-purpose sports structure.

== See also ==
- Castello Gizzi
