= Alberto Briganti =

Italian aviator (1896–1997)

- Born: 22 December 1896; Umbertide, Kingdom of Italy
- Died: 2 July 1997 (aged 100); Rome, Italy
- Military career
- Allegiance: Kingdom of Italy; Italy
- Branch: Regia Marina; Regia Aeronautica; Italian Air Force
- Rank: General
- Commands: Seaplane Experimentation Center; Experimental Maritime Bombardment Wing; 1st Aerial Bombing Brigade; Air Force of Libya; 1st Territorial Air Zone; 1st Air Fleet; Auxiliary Aviation of the Navy; Aegean Air Force Command
- Conflicts: World War I; Occupation of Fiume; World War II; Battle of the Mediterranean; Battle of Rhodes
- Awards: Bronze Medal of Military Valour (twice); Order of Merit of the Italian Republic; Military Order of Italy

Alberto Briganti (22 December 1896 – 2 July 1997) was an Italian military pilot who served as a general in the Regia Aeronautica during World War II, and in the Aeronautica Militare after the war.

== Biography ==
Briganti's career began as an ensign in the Servizio Aeronautico (Aeronautical Service) of Italy’s Regia Marina (Royal Navy) in 1916, serving in the seaplane bases at Venice, Ancona and Porto Corsini; in this capacity he carried out several bombing missions with Macchi M.3 and FBA seaplanes and was awarded two Bronze Medals of Military Valour. In the autumn of 1917 he was assigned to the 252nd Seaplane Squadron, based on the island of Sant'Andrea (Venice) and on 16 November he was transferred to the 253rd Squadron. On 1 June 1918 Sub-Lieutenant Briganti was assigned to the 264th Squadron at Ancona, equipped with FBA flying boats. On June 3, two Austro-Hungarian seamen of Italian origin decided to desert and stole a Lohner L seaplane, which they flew across the Adriatic Sea, landing near Fano, where they were captured; Briganti, along with lieutenant Aldo Pellegrini, was sent from Ancona with the task of recovering the aircraft.

After the end of the war, Briganti joined the forces of poet Gabriele D'Annunzio during their occupation of Fiume, as a seaplane pilot, from February 4 to September 12, 1920. After returning to service within the Navy, he served as lieutenant on the battleship Vittorio Emanuele, during the early stages of the pacification of Libya. In 1923, with the establishment of the Regia Aeronautica, he was among the officers who chose to leave the Navy to join the new armed force, with the rank of captain.

In 1926 Briganti became secretary of General Alberto Bonzani, State Undersecretary of the Air Force, and in 1927-1928 he served as aide to Italo Balbo, who had succeeded Bonzani as Undersecretary of the Air Force. From 1928 to 1930 he was the commander of the Seaplane Experimentation Center at Vigna di Valle Air Base in Bracciano near Rome, and from 1930 to 1933 he was aide-de-camp to King Victor Emmanuel III. From 1933 to 1936 he was commander of the Experimental Maritime Bombardment Wing (later renamed 31st Wing) at the Orbetello seaplane base, and in 1936, after promotion to Air Brigadier General (equivalent of air commodore), he commanded the 1st Aerial Bombing Brigade, serving under Prince Amedeo, Duke of Aosta.

From 1938 to May 1940 Briganti commanded the air force of Libya, serving once again under Balbo, then he was given command of the 1st Territorial Air Zone till 1941, after which he briefly served as temporary commander of the 1st Air Fleet. From 1 January 1942 he commanded the Auxiliary Aviation of the Navy, and in March 1943 he was given command of the air forces of the Dodecanese (Aereomil Egeo), with headquarters in Rhodes.

After the Armistice of Cassibile and the outbreak of the battle of Rhodes, Briganti unsuccessfully tried to persuade Admiral Inigo Campioni to fight the Germans with the same methods they had been using, by capturing General Ulrich Kleemann, commander of Sturmdivision Rhodos, who had met Campioni to talk under a white flag. On 9 September Briganti obtained permission from Campioni to open fire on German troops and aircraft on the ground at the Maritza airfield, but on 11 September Campioni decided to surrender. The Germans proposed to Briganti to collaborate with them, but he rejected the proposal and was then sent to officer POW camp 64/Z in Skoki, Poland. In late January 1945 the camp was evacuated due to the advance of the Red Army; during the forced march through the snow, in which six generals were shot by the SS guards for not being able to keep up pace with the column, Briganti and General Francesco Antonio Arena managed to escape and hide in a Polish farm, but were discovered by two Soviet soldiers who mistook them for German collaborators, and shot them. Arena died, whereas Briganti survived despite having been shot a second time by the same soldiers, who had returned to the spot and found him still alive. The Polish farmers took him to a nearby hospital, and he was able to return to Italy in October 1945.

After the war the new Chief of Staff of the Italian Air Force, General Mario Ajmone Cat, appointed Briganti adjunct Chief of Staff of the Air Force, a post he held from 3 August 1946 to 1 January 1947, after which he was appointed Deputy Chief of Staff of the Air Force and from November 1947 Secretary General of the Air Force. In 1949 he became president of the High Council of the Air Force, and in early 1952 he was appointed president of the High Council of the Armed Forces. He retired from the Air Force in February 1952, after which he was general director of Civil Aviation and Air Traffic for a year.

Briganti published his memoirs, Oltre le nubi il sereno, in the 1980s, and died in Rome on 2 July 1997, at age 100.
