= Tullio Covre =

Italian WWII fighter pilot

- Born: 7 November 1917; Villafranca Padovana, Padova, Italy
- Died: 2 July 1961 (aged 43); Messina, Sicily
- Burial place: Verona
- Military career
- Allegiance: Kingdom of Italy; Italian Social Republic
- Branch: Regia Aeronautica; National Republican Air Force
- Service years: 1935-1945
- Rank: Sergeant Major (pilot)
- Units: 353ª Squadriglia, 20º Gruppo, 53º Stormo Caccia Terrestre
- Wars: East African Campaign, Second World War
- Awards: Silver Medal of Military Valor; War Cross of Military Valor; Silver Medal of Aeronautic Valor; Iron Cross (2nd class); Cross of Saint Stephen; Silver Medal for Civil Valor

Tullio Covre (7 November 1917 – 2 July 1961) was an Italian aerobatic instructor and World War II fighter pilot in the Regia Aeronautica. A flying ace with five confirmed victories, after the Armistice of Cassibile he joined the Aeronautica Nazionale Repubblicana. He was decorated with two Silver Medal of Military Valor (Medaglia d'Argento al Valor Militare), one Silver Medal of Aeronautic Valor (Medaglia d'argento al valore aeronautico) and one German Iron Cross 2nd Class. He lost his life in a sporting flight accident on July 2, 1961.

== Biography ==
Tullio Covre volunteered for the Royal Italian Air Force in 1934, at the age of 17. He gained his pilot's licence on 24 August 1935. The following year, he was enlisted in the Regia Aeronautica. On 16 January 1936, he graduated from the Aviano Fighter School, a flying school that specialised in the fighter pilot training. In 1937 he was posted to the 116th attack Squadron and took part in the Second Italo-Ethiopian War. In the same year he contracted malaria and had to return home, but in 1938 he returned to active service.

In 1939 he was sent to Hungary, where he trained 60 fighter pilots. He was awarded the prestigious Eagle of Saint Stephen (Hungarian pilot's licence) and the Cross of Saint Stephen. In February 1940 he was promoted to sergeant major and joined the 54th fighter squadron. In September of the same year he was assigned to the Fiat G.50 equipped 20th Fighter Group "Gatto Nero" (Black Cat), and in October he flew with Corpo Aereo Italiano during the Battle of Britain. He operated escort missions from Ursel base (Belgium) engaging in several dogfights with British Supermarine Spitfires.

In December 1940, Covre, along with the 20th Fighter Group, moved to Libya, where he was stationed for six months. In Libya however he suffered health problems and was repatriated again. From 1940 to 1941 Tullio Covre carried out more than 110 combat flights and shot down 5 aircraft.

In August 1943 he was sent to Campoformido with the 1st Fighter Group. After the Armistice of Cassibile, Covre joined the Aeronautica Nazionale Repubblicana (National Republican Air Force) and was assigned to the Fiat G.55 equipped 2nd Fighter Squadron "Diavoli Rossi" (Red Devils). On 31 October 1944 he shot down a P-47 Thunderbolt, but in December he engaged in a dogfight with a Spitfire and was forced to make an emergency landing at Thiene. In the following March he shot down a B-25 Mitchell from the 310th Bomb Group based in Corsica. In April 1945 he was sent to Aviano to instruct the pilots who had been newly assigned to the "Red Devils", with a two-seat Bf 109 trainer. Covre took part in the last battle between the National Republican Air Force and the Allies, fought in the skies over Verona on April 19, 1945. He engaged in a dogfight with a P-51 Mustang of the 325th Fighter Group's 317th Fighter Squadron, flying in a pair with the aircraft of sergeant Antonio Tampieri. They were attacked and strafed. Covre's aircraft's glycol tank was damaged and there was an explosion in the cockpit. He was about to bail out, but just before jumping he became aware of an attack from behind on Tampieri. He re-entered the aircraft to warn Tampieri by radio, and then he jumped out but became entangled in the antenna of the aircraft. He managed to free himself at the last moment. Tampieri, warned of the danger, avoided the attack and returned to base.

== Personal life ==
In 1945 Covre married Vittoria Nuvoloni, with whom he had seven children.

== Honors ==
Military decorations
Silver Medal of Military Valor
Iron Cross 2nd Class

He was awarded two Silver Medals of Military Valour. The motivation was: "A pilot of great courage and enthusiasm, he carried into the battle of Sidi Barrani the faith and the impetus of Italian fighters. He cooperated in the shooting down of 12 aircraft, 50 mechanised transports, encampments and shacks, bringing destruction to the enemy camp. In a subsequent battle he cooperated in shooting down 14 enemy aircraft. (...) A fighter pilot of great skill and courage during the battle of Marmarica, in fierce and violent fights he valiantly sustained the brunt of the superior enemy forces and contributed to the downing of a number of enemy aircraft".

== Peacetime ==
After the end of the Second World War Tullio Covre became a civil instructor and dedicated himself to sport flying. He assembled the first 3 aircraft civil aerobatic formation, called "Frecce Rosse", at the Aeroclub of Boscomantico near Verona. In 1961 he purchased a Falco from the company Aeromere of Gardolo di Trento, Italy. During the early trials the variable-pitch propeller presented some problems and was replaced with a fixed-pitch unit. On 24 and 25 June 1961 he participated with his newly purchased Falco in the Giro del Golfo (Naples, Italy), after which he returned to Gardolo to change the propeller again. A new Aeromatic variable pitch prop was fitted, the only one available in the warehouse. On 28 June he left for Catania and on the 30th flew to Palermo. On Saturday 1 July 1961 he took part in the prestigious Giro di Sicilia (Sicily, Italy) and completed the first stage from Palermo to Catania.

== Accident and death ==
On Sunday 2 July the second stage, Catania-Palermo, began. Whilst he was over the beach of Mare Grosso, near Messina, the propeller failed and it lost a blade. Covre, now in full emergency, tried to land on the beach below that was crowded with bathers and students, he gestured from the window, but his desperate signals were interpreted as a salutation. Covre decided to ditch in the sea, not a manoeuvre that should present particular difficulty for a pilot of his experience and ability. In the impact with the water he stroke his head against the metal of the radio, was knocked out and the aircraft sank. The aircraft was recovered three days later due to the strong currents. His heroic gesture would be honoured by the Carnegie Foundation, that awarded Covre with the silver medal for Civil Valour: "The board of directors at the meeting of 30 May 1963 have granted the medal of second degree to the memory of Tullio Covre, pilot, for the following act of heroism performed on 2 July 1961 in Messina: "Whilst he was participating in the Tour of Sicily by aeroplane, finding himself in difficulty due to an engine failure, he tried to carry out a forced landing on the beach, attempting to distance the numerous bathers, amongst which there were children from a colony; but his signals were interpreted as a greeting wave and no one moved away. To avoid a massacre he managed to turn the aircraft out to sea, going down with the aircraft: a shining example of the most noble altruism." The memory of Tullio Covre was also remembered on a commemorative stone place at the airport of Boscomantico in 1962. The Italian Air Force awarded him the Silver Medal of Aeronautic Valor. Verona has dedicated a street to his name.

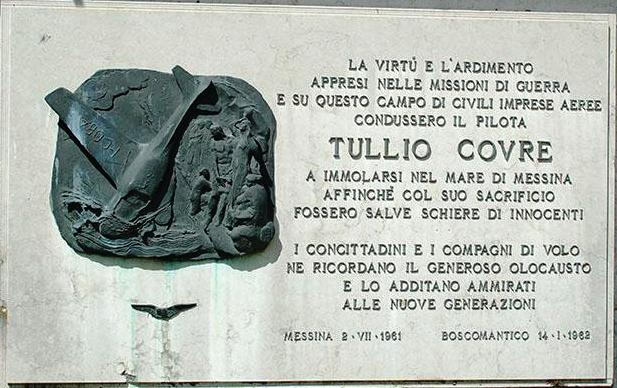
Tullio Covre memorial at Airport Verona-Boscomantico

== Bibliography ==
- Arena, Nino (1995). L'Aeronautica Nazionale Repubblicana. La guerra aerea in Italia 1943-1945. Parma: Ermanno Albertelli Editore.
- Cantù, Gianni (2013). Verona volat. Un secolo di aviazione a Verona. Cierre Grafica, Sommacampagna (VR). ISBN 978-88-95351-91-9.

== Memorials ==
- The municipality of Verona, the city where Covre settled with his family after World War II, has dedicated a street to his name.
- The memory of Tullio Covre is also remembered on a commemorative stone at the airport of Boscomantico (Verona), placed there in 1962.

== Trivia ==
- He was famous for being a courageous and highly skilled pilot, but not particularly disciplined. He was nicknamed "otto di rigore" which is the expression to indicate the typical punishment for undisciplined soldiers: eight days of solitary confinement.
