= Aldo Pellegrini (general) =

Italian Air Force general

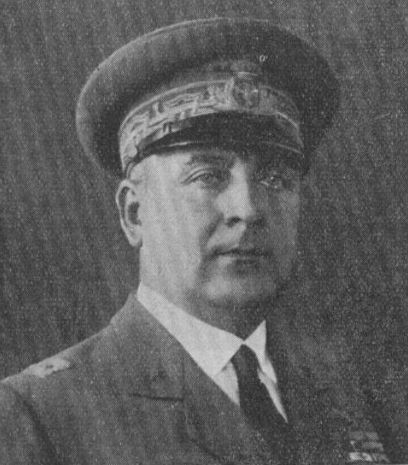
- Born: 28 August 1888; Bologna, Kingdom of Italy
- Died: 7 December 1940 (aged 52); Cartosio, Kingdom of Italy
- Military career
- Allegiance: Kingdom of Italy
- Branch: Regia Marina; Regia Aeronautica
- Service years: 1908–1940
- Rank: generale di squadra aerea (air vice marshal)
- Commands: 253rd Squadron; 268th Squadron; High-Seas Air Navigation School; 3rd Air Fleet
- Conflicts: Italo-Turkish War; World War I; World War II
- Awards: Silver Medal of Military Valor (twice); Bronze Medal of Military Valor; Order of Saints Maurice and Lazarus; Colonial Order of the Star of Italy

Aldo Pellegrini (28 August 1888 – 7 December 1940) was an Italian general and aviator. He served initially in the Regia Marina (Royal Italian Navy), transitioning to the Regia Aeronautica (Royal Italian Air Force) upon its formation. A veteran of the Italo-Turkish War and World War I, where he earned multiple decorations for valor piloting seaplanes, he became a key figure in Italo Balbo's pioneering mass formation flights across the Mediterranean and Atlantic, including serving as Vice Commander of the Decennial Air Cruise in 1933, for which he received the Gold Medal of Aeronautic Valor. He reached the rank of Brigadier General (Generale di squadra aerea). Pellegrini died in an aircraft accident in December 1940 while serving as Vice President of the Italian Armistice Commission with France.

== Biography ==
He was born in Bologna on 28 August 1888, and enlisted in the Royal Italian Navy in 1908, entering the Royal Naval Academy of Livorno. He graduated with the rank of ensign in 1910, and in 1911-1912 he took part in the Italo-Turkish War. When the Kingdom of Italy entered World War I on 24 May 1915, he held the rank of lieutenant; having developed an towards aviation, he attended the Naval School of Aeronautics of Taranto, obtaining a license of seaplane pilot in June of the same year. During the war he held various positions and was in command of some squadrons of the Naval Air Auxiliary Service, distinguishing himself for courage and technical ability.

In the spring of 1917 he was in command of the 258th Squadron, equipped with FBA Type H aircraft, embarked on the seaplane carrier Europa, and in June of the same year he was transferred to the 253rd Squadron, of which he assumed command on the following 5 August. From 19 January 1918 he commanded the 264th Squadron stationed in Ancona, also equipped with FBA aircraft. On 3 June, two Austro-Hungarian seamen of Italian origin decided to desert and stole a Lohner L seaplane, which they flew across the Adriatic Sea, landing near Fano, where they were captured; Pellegrini, along with sub-lieutenant Alberto Briganti, was sent from Ancona with the task of recovering the aircraft. By the end of the war he had been awarded two silver medals and one bronze medal for military valor.

In 1924, when he had reached the rank of lieutenant commander, he decided to join the newly established Regia Aeronautica. In March 1925 he was promoted to the rank of lieutenant colonel and in June 1926 he became Chief of Staff of the Minister of Aviation, holding that post until October 1929. In July 1927 he became a colonel and shortly after he took part in an inspection flight over the Mediterranean Sea, along with Italo Balbo and engineer Ettore Alberi, in preparation for Balbo's planned mass air cruises over the western and eastern Mediterranean, that would take place in 1928 and 1929. Pellegrini himself was chosen by Balbo as flying commander for he Eastern Mediterranean Air Cruise of 1929; this choice led to a final break-up between Balbo and Francesco De Pinedo, who expected to be chosen instead.

In September 1929 Pellegrini was promoted to the rank of air brigade general (equivalent to air commodore), and in May 1931, after the sudden death of Lieutenant Colonel Umberto Maddalena, he assumed the position of commander of the High-Seas Air Navigation School of Orbetello; in this capacity he collaborated in the realization of Balbo's Italy-Brazil air cruise (17 December 1930 – 15 January 1931). Between 1 July and 12 August 1933 he took part, as deputy commander, in the Decennial Air Cruise, from Rome across the Atlantic to Chicago and New York organized by Minister of Aviation Balbo. On this occasion he personally flew a Savoia-Marchetti S.55X seaplane. Later in 1933 he replaced Manlio Molfese as head of division at the head of the Civil Aviation Directorate of the Ministry of Air Force (Civilavia).

In view of Italy's entry into World War II, on 16 May 1940 he assumed the position of commander of the 3rd Air Fleet, with headquarters in Rome. After the signing of the armistice of Villa Incisa with France, on 26 June he assumed the position of vice-president of the Italian Armistice Commission with France (Commissione Italiana di Armistizio con la Francia, CIAF).

On 28 June he participated in the first meeting of the Armistice Commission, in which sub-commissions were created to deal with general issues and issues relating to the French army, navy and air force. On 20 July 1940, he was elevated to the rank of air fleet general (equivalent to air marshal). On 7 December 1940 he took off from Rome aboard a Savoia-Marchetti S.79 together with General Pietro Pintor, to reach the CIAF headquarters of in Turin, but the plane crashed in Cartosio, on the border between the provinces of Savona and Alessandria, killing everyone aboard.
