= Luigi Gatti (politician) =

Italian politician

Prefect of Treviso
- In office 4 November 1943 – 22 June 1944
- Prefect of Milan
- In office 23 June 1944 – 2 April 1945

Private Secretary of the Duce
- In office 2 April 1945 – 28 April 1945
- Leader: Benito Mussolini

Personal details
- Born: 19 June 1913 Milan, Kingdom of Italy
- Died: 28 April 1945 (aged 31) Dongo, Kingdom of Italy
- Party: National Fascist Party; Republican Fascist Party

Military service
- Allegiance: Kingdom of Italy
- Branch/service: Corpo Truppe Volontarie
- Years of service: 1936–1939

Luigi Gatti (19 June 1913 – 28 April 1945) was an Italian Fascist politician and civil servant, who served as prefect of Treviso and Milan during the Italian Social Republic as well as the last private secretary of Benito Mussolini.

== Biography ==
Gatti was born in Milan in 1913 and graduated in law in the early 1930s. After the outbreak of the Spanish Civil War, he enlisted in the Corps of Volunteer Troops and fought on the Francoist side from 22 December 1936 to 10 March 1939, when he married Moras Maria del Pilar, four years younger than him. After returning from Spain, he embarked on a political career, being appointed in 1939 as Secretary of the Nuoro section of the National Fascist Party. In 1942, he became federal secretary of the PNF of Treviso, and on 18 April 1943, he started working for the Ministry of the Interior.

After the armistice of Cassibile in September 1943, he joined the Italian Social Republic; he was appointed second class prefect on 28 October 1943 and a week later he returned to Treviso, where he was appointed Head of the Province, a position he held until 22 June 1944, when he was replaced by Francesco Bellini. He was then employed by the Ministry of Foreign Affairs of the Italian Social Republic and served as prefect of Milan from 23 June 1944 to 2 April 1945, when he was appointed as Mussolini's private secretary at the proposal of Nicola Bombacci, of whom Gatti was a trusted collaborator.

Gatti proposed that the Duce flee to Spain, where he would be hosted by his in-laws, but this plan never materialized. During the twilight of the Italian Social Republic, he was tasked by Mussolini, together with Bombacci, with carrying out a "counter-investigation" into the murder of Giacomo Matteotti, aimed at showing he had not been involved at all in the crime. After sheltering his wife and three children in a convent in Milan, Gatti followed Mussolini to Menaggio, where at dawn on 27 April 1945 he was taken prisoner by the partisans; a few hours later he was taken to Dongo and shot along with other Fascist leaders and officials. His body was among those later exhibited in Piazzale Loreto in Milan.
