= Commissione Italiana d'Armistizio con la Francia =

During World War II, the Commissione Italiana d'Armistizio con la Francia ("Italian Armistice Commission with France") or CIAF was a temporary civil and military body charged with implementing the Franco-Italian armistice of 24 June 1940 (Note: This ended the brief war between Italy and France that began on 10/11 June. The armistice came into effect on 25 June.) and harmonising it with the Franco-German armistice of 22 June. It had broad authority over the military, economic, diplomatic and financial relations between France and Italy until the Italo-German occupation of France (Operation Anton) on 11 November 1942. Thereafter its powers were gradually transferred to the Fourth Army, which was under the command of General Mario Vercellino and in occupation of southern France. The headquarters of the CIAF was in Turin and it was subordinate to the Comando Supremo (Italian supreme command). It liaised with the German Armistice Commission (German: Waffenstillstandskommission, WAKO) in Wiesbaden.

== Structure ==
Structurally, the CIAF had a presidency (presidenza) and four subcommissions (sottocommissioni) for the Army, Navy, Air Force and "General Affairs" (Affari Generali). The first representative of the army was General Carlo Vecchiarelli, of the navy Admiral Ildebrando Goiran and of the air force General Aldo Pellegrini. The French were represented at Turin by a delegation of their own (the Délégation française à la Commission italienne d'Armistice or DFCIA) and four subdelegations corresponding to the subcommissions. A Mixed Delegation (Delegazione Mista) was sent to Corsica, (Note: At first, Admiral Oscar Di Giamberardino was appointed head of the Corsican delegation. He was later replaced by Admiral Guido Vannutelli.) where it was sidelined after the Italian occupation of Corsica in November 1942, when a Political and General Affairs Office (Ufficio Politico e Affari Vari) was established there subordinate to the Fourth Army.

General Affairs was concerned mainly with protecting Italian emigrants in France. On 4 February 1941, it began establishing Civil Assistance and Repatriation Delegations (Delegazioni Civili Rimpatrio e Assistenza) or DRAs in French cities. These were originally staffed by consular officials acting as reserve officers, but on 15 January 1943 they were converted into consular offices subordinate to the liaison office of the Ministry of Foreign Affairs at the headquarters of the Fourth Army. On 15 April, the General Affairs subcommission was suppressed. It had been instrumental in repatriating 70,000 Italians between October 1940 and April 1943.

== History ==
On 5 November 1940, a subcommission for Administration of Occupied Territories (Amministrazione dei Territori Occupati) was set up. It appointed civil commissioners in the occupied communities of Bessans, Bramans, Fontan, Isola, Lanslebourg, Menton, Montgenèvre, Ristolas and Séez; they remained active down to the Italian armistice with the Allies (8 September 1943). Later, another subcommission for Armaments (Armamenti) supervised French weapons factories between the Italian border and the Rhône, and placed some under joint control of French companies and the Italian war production office, Fabbriguerra.

On 19 February 1942, a permanent Italo-French Economic Commission (Commissione Economica Italo-Francese) was set up in Rome, where it held monthly meetings. The head of the Italian delegation was Amedeo Giannini and of the French Joseph Sanguinetti. It was distinct from the Subcommission for Economic and Financial Affairs (Sottocommissione Affari Economici e Finanziari, SCAEF) established under Tomasso Lazzari in Turin. SCAEF was in charge of the spoils of war, policing the alpine border, Italian rights in French colonial harbours, maritime traffic and Italian property in France. Another subcommission was set up in Turin to foster trade between Italy and German-occupied France, and yet another body was working at the Italian embassy in Paris to the same end. Finally, Teodoro Pigozzi of FIAT had been appointed commissario commerciale to France by the Ministry of Foreign Trade and Currency Exchange. These various bodies did not coordinate their work effectively.

The work of the CIAF was complicated by the re-opening of the Italian embassy in Paris on 4 February 1941 and the appointment of an ambassador, Gino Buti, on 20 February 1942. Although Buti's instructions required him not to deal with issues covered by the armistice, the French took advantage of his presence to bypass the CIAF. After occupation of unoccupied France in November 1942, the CIAF retained control only of the original occupied territory (demarcated by the "green line", linea verde). By early December 1942, the CIAF was moribund and the leader of the French delegation, Admiral Émile-André Duplat, asked President Arturo Vacca-Maggiolini whether it in fact still existed. Both Italy and Germany resolved to maintain their armistice commissions for legal purposes, although they would not be subordinated to the requirements of the occupying forces. In these unusual circumstances, Vacca-Maggiolini was forced to justify his role to General Vercellino on 31 December 1942, and it was not until 10 March 1943 that the CIAF's residual role was clarified by Chief of the General Staff Vittorio Ambrosio, who on 20 March abolished the separate subcommissions of the service branches.

== In Africa and Asia ==
The CIAF was responsible for overseeing French forces east of the Rhône, in North Africa and in the Levant. It therefore established a presence in France's colonies. A General Delegation (Delegazione Generale) was sent to Algiers and a Mixed Delegation to Djibouti. These contained a variety of subcommissions and control sections. General Gaëtan Germain in Djibouti convinced the armistice commission that it was inadvisable and impractical to demilitarise the colony, in which approximately 8,000 French soldiers (with tanks and airplanes) thus remained on guard.

In the French colony of Chad, concern that an Italian armistice commission would arrive was one factor in Governor Félix Éboué's decision to rally to Free France on 26 August 1940. No commission ever operated in Chad.

An armistice commission under General Fedele de Giorgis arrived in Beirut late in August 1940 to oversee the implementation of the armistice terms in Syria and Lebanon. It included 50 Italian officials plus a handful of Germans. In May 1941, as the Axis prepared to intervene in the Anglo-Iraqi War, Rudolf Rahn arrived in Beirut to head a German sub-commission under the Italians.

In Tunisia, the CIAF ordered the demilitarization of the Mareth Line, which rendered it useless to the Italians and Germans when the British advanced on Tunisia from Libya in early 1943. The first of the French anti-Jewish laws, the Loi portant statut des Juifs, was published in Tunisia by a decree of Bey Ahmad II, countersigned by Resident-General Jean-Pierre Esteva, on 30 November 1940. The CIAF protested the damaging effects of this decree on the Italian property owners, many of them Jewish, in Tunisia.

On 27 May 1942, General Bianini, head of the CIAF post in Tangier, died of his wounds after an assassination attempt by an Algerian.

== Executive officers ==
=== Presidents ===
- General Pietro Pintor (27 June 1940 – 7 December 1940), died in office
- General Camillo Grossi (8 December 1940 – 16 June 1941), died in office
- General Arturo Vacca-Maggiolini (18 June 1941 – 8 September 1943)

=== Secretaries general ===
- General Fernando Gelich (20 August 1940 – 20 December 1942)
- Colonel Evaristo Fioravanti (20 December 1942 – 8 September 1943)
