= Arrigo Tessari =

Italian Air Force general

- Born: 4 January 1897; Belluno, Kingdom of Italy
- Died: 5 September 1971 (aged 74); Belluno, Italy
- Military career
- Allegiance: Kingdom of Italy; Italian Social Republic
- Branch: Royal Italian Army; Regia Aeronautica; National Republican Air Force
- Service years: 1916-1945
- Rank: Air Brigade General
- Commands: 89th Ansaldo SVA Squadron; 16th Fighter Group "La Cucaracha"; 53rd Ground Fighter Wing; Italian Air Force in Albania; Italian Air Force in Greece; Chief of Staff of the Aeronautica Nazionale Repubblicana
- Conflicts: World War I; Albanian campaign; Pacification of Libya; Battle of Kufra; Spanish Civil War; World War II; Italian invasion of France; Greco-Italian War
- Awards: Silver Medal of Military Valor (three times); Bronze Medal of Military Valor; War Merit Cross; Order of the Crown of Italy

Arrigo Tessari (Belluno, 4 January 1897 – 5 September 1971) was an Italian Air Force general during World War II. He commanded Italian air forces in Albania and later Greece from 1940 to 1942, and was deputy chief of staff of the Aeronautica Nazionale Repubblicana from March to July 1944 and its chief of staff from July to August 1944, as well as State Undersecretary for the Air Force of the Italian Social Republic.

== Biography ==
He was born on 4 January 1897 in Belluno, and during the First World War he served as in Albania with the rank of lieutenant, flying as a pilot in the 85th Fighter Squadron. In October 1923 he joined the newly established Regia Aeronautica, as commander of the 89th Ansaldo SVA Squadron, stationed in Tripolitania. He participated in the pacification of Libya in the colonial aviation over the next eight years, returning to Italy with a Silver and a Bronze Medal of Military Valor.

From 1937 to 1939 he participated in the Spanish Civil War, with the rank of lieutenant colonel, in command of the 16th Fighter Group "La Cucaracha", belonging to the 3rd Fighter Wing of the Aviazione Legionaria based in Caspe. In December 1938 his Group was tasked with supporting the Nationalist advance on Barcelona. With the end of the war in Spain he returned to Italy, and on April 15, 1939 he was appointed commander of the 53rd Ground Fighter Wing (equipped with Fiat CR.42 biplane fighters), based on the Turin-Caselle airport, a post he still held at the time of the entry of the Kingdom of Italy into World War II, on 10 June 1940.

On June 15 the Italian Headquarters ordered his unit to attack the French airfields of Le Cannet-des-Maures and Cuers-Pierrefeu, in Provence, with the aim of destroying the French fighter force on the ground. Tessari personally participated in the attack, claiming four French Morane-Saulnier MS.406 shot down; for this action he was awarded another Silver Medal of Military Valor. On 15 August 1940 he assumed command of the Italian Air Force in Albania, and following the attack on Greece, he directed air operations against Greece until the end of the campaign in April 1941. After the fall of Greece he also assumed command of the Italian air units based in that country, with headquarters in Athens. He was promoted to Air Brigade General (air commodore) on February 26, 1942, and the next day he left his command and returned to Italy. He was then appointed commander of the air units based in Turin and later of those based in Lecce, directing the activity of fighter groups tasked with escorting convoys carrying supplies to the Balkans and to North Africa. Finally, he was appointed Inspector of Fighter Units at the General Staff of the Air Force.

On 8 September 1943, when the Armistice of Cassibile was made public, Tessari was in Rome, at the Ministry of Aeronautics. Later in that month, he joined the Italian Social Republic and made contact with Alessandro Pavolini and Marshal of Italy Rodolfo Graziani, placing himself at their disposal, although he declined Graziani's offer to appoint him Minister of the Air Force of the RSI. On September 24, Lieutenant Colonel Ernesto Botto was appointed Undersecretary of State for the Air Force of the Italian Social Republic, and at the end of the month he went to Rome, where he met Graziani and Tessari; the latter remained in Rome until November, when he moved to Bassano del Grappa, being entrusted with administrative tasks within the Air Force of the RSI. When Botto resigned from his post on 7 March 1944, due to growing dissent towards the most extremist Fascist leaders and the German commands in Italy, Tessari was chosen to replace him as Undersecretary for the Air Force and chief of staff of the Aeronautica Nazionale Repubblicana, being more liked by the Germans. He too ended up clashing with them, however, due to their attempts to fully absorb the ANR in the Luftwaffe; in May 1944 he wrote to Mussolini that the Germans were systematically dismantling the hangars of Italian air bases in order to send the metal to Germany. He eventually resigned from his post on 26 July 1944 (although he de facto remained in office until August 20), being replaced by Colonel Ruggero Bonomi and retiring to private life in his native Belluno. After the end of the hostilities he was accused of collaborationism, imprisoned for eight months in the military prison of Forte Boccea in Rome, subjected to an 'epuration' process and forcibly placed on absolute leave.

After the war he was councilor at the Belluno section of the Bank of Italy, president of the "Arturo Dell'Oro" Aeroclub of Belluno from 1949 to 1964 and from 1967 to 1970, and president of the Belluno section of the Italian Red Cross. He died in Belluno on 5 September 1971.
