= Ernesto Botto =

Italian politician

- Born: 8 November 1907; Turin, Kingdom of Italy
- Died: 9 December 1984 (aged 77); Turin, Italy
- Military career
- Allegiance: Kingdom of Italy; Italian Social Republic
- Branch: Regia Aeronautica; National Republican Air Force
- Service years: 1929-1944
- Rank: Colonel
- Commands: 32nd Fighter Squadron; 73rd Fighter Squadron; 9th Fighter Group; Udine Fighter School; Chief of Staff of the Aeronautica Nazionale Repubblicana
- Conflicts: Spanish Civil War; World War II; North African campaign; Italian campaign
- Awards: Gold Medal of Military Valor; Silver Medal of Military Valor; War Merit Cross

Ernesto Botto (8 November 1907 – 9 December 1984) was an Italian Air Force officer during the Spanish Civil War and World War II. A flying ace with eight confirmed victories (in addition to twenty shared and seven probable) and a recipient of the Gold Medal of Military Valor, after the Armistice of Cassibile he became State Undersecretary for the Air Force of the Italian Social Republic and Chief of Staff of the Aeronautica Nazionale Repubblicana. He was known as Gamba di ferro ("Iron Leg") due to the artificial leg he wore after being wounded in combat during the Spanish Civil War.

== Biography ==
Born in Turin on November 8, 1907, Botto entered the Air Force Academy of Caserta in 1929, obtaining his pilot license in 1932 and graduating with the rank of second lieutenant in 1933. On the same year, he was promoted to lieutenant and appointed instructor at the fighter school of Castiglione del Lago. In 1936 he was assigned to the 57th Group of the 1st Land Fighter Wing and promoted to captain. In 1937, assigned to the 4th Land Fighter Wing, he commanded the 32nd Fighter Squadron during the Spanish Civil War, scoring five air victories; on 12 October 1937 his squadron took off together with the 31st Fighter Squadron (led by Captain Luigi Borgogno), and during the subsequent air battle over Fuentes de Ebro Botto was hit by a bullet which smashed his right leg. He managed to return to the base and was hospitalized for a long time in Zaragoza, where part of his right leg had to be amputated and replaced with an artificial limb.

When he visited his squadron while still on crutches, he found out that all the planes had been decorated with the symbol of an iron leg in his honor, and since then this became his nickname. Upon returning to Italy, he was acclaimed and awarded the Gold Medal of Military Valor with a solemn ceremony at the Altare della Patria; the 32nd Squadron was officially christened "Iron Leg". For a long time he was not recalled into active service, as his conditions were deemed unsuitable for piloting, but in 1938, after having trained to pilot despite his conditions, he was recalled as commander of the 73rd Fighter Squadron of the 4th Wing, based at Gorizia.

In 1939 he was promoted to major, and at the time of Italy's entrance into World War II he was in Libya, at the head of the 9th Group of the 4th Fighter Wing. He scored three more air victories during air battles over Marmarica between June and October 1940, being awarded a Silver Medal of Military Valor, but then suffered a serious head injury in a road accident, which made him definitively unfit to fly. In 1941 he was promoted to lieutenant colonel and in 1943 he became commander of the fighter school of Udine, later moved to Gorizia.

At the proclamation of the armistice of Cassibile, on 8 September 1943, Botto was in Gorizia. He went to Rome and discussed together with General Arrigo Tessari (commander of the 53rd Wing), Colonel Tito Falconi (commander of the 3rd Wing), Colonel Angelo Tondi (former personal pilot of Benito Mussolini) and other officers about the possibility of setting up an Italian "air foreign legion" alongside the Luftwaffe, in order to protect Italian cities from Allied air raids. Having refused to collaborate with the Germans, however, Botto was about to be sent to Germany as an Italian military internee when on 24 September he was appointed Undersecretary of State of the Air Force of the Italian Social Republic by Benito Mussolini, with the task of rebuilding an efficient air force. His choice was suggested by Marshal Rodolfo Graziani, Minister of National Defense of the RSI, who chose him over more senior officers due to the fame and high regard he enjoyed among the ranks of the Italian Air Force. After taking office, Botto also assumed the post of Chief of Staff of the Aeronautica Nazionale Repubblicana, appointing Lieutenant Colonel Giuseppe Baylon as Deputy Chief of Staff. He then called for Italian pilots, through radio broadcasts, to join the ANR, with some success.

On October 14, he issued a notice ordering all Air Force personnel that had remained in territory controlled by the Italian Social Republic to report to the assembly centers to return to service, giving time from October 18 to October 28. The idea of an independent Italian air force operating in German-occupied territory was strongly opposed by the Field Marshal Wolfram von Richthofen, commander of Luftflotte 2 engaged in the Italian theater; he requested the cancellation of Botto's proclaim, also because two days earlier he himself had ordered to start recruiting personnel to create an "Italian foreign legion" within the Luftwaffe.

Botto did not give in, however, and the Aeronautica Nazionale Repubblicana was formally established on 27 October 1943. Three days earlier Botto, with the support of Mussolini and Graziani, had personally met in Berlin Reichsmarschall Hermann Göring, commander of the Luftwaffe, and obtained cessation of the recruitment of Italian personnel in the Luftwaffe, as well as the return of most of the aircraft and materials requisitioned after 8 September, this allowing the ANR to effectively become an operational force. Botto's efforts led the ANR to grow, by 1944, to a force of about 35,000 men (a further 38,000 being attached to German commands). However, disagreements with some members of the Fascist hierarchy (especially Roberto Farinacci, who repeatedly attacked him in his newspaper Il Regime Fascista) and his hostile attitude towards the Germans, who underlined his dubious Fascist faith, created a tension that eventually led Botto to ask, in January 1944, to be exonerated from his post. Among the causes of his decision was Farinacci's request to make all soldiers swear allegiance to Fascism and the replacement of the military salute with the Roman salute.

Mussolini accepted his resignation, which for various reasons became effective only at the beginning of March 1944, when Botto was replaced by General Arrigo Tessari. The news of his resignation created discontent among many members of the ANR. He retired to Turin, where he lived quietly until the end of the war. After the war he joined the Italian Social Movement and in 1951 was elected municipal councilor of Turin, but was later forced to resign. He died in Turin on December 9, 1984.
