= National Republican Air Force =

German puppet state air force in Italy (1943–45)

Wing emblem of the A.N.R. from 1944 to 1945.

The National Republican Air Force (Italian: Aeronautica Nazionale Repubblicana, ANR) was the air force of the Italian Social Republic, a World War II German puppet state in Italy.

== Description ==
Wing and fuselage emblem of the A.N.R. from 1943 to 1944. The fuselage flag was retained and placed next to the cross.

This air force was tasked with defending the industrial areas of the region, intercepting Allied bombers en route to southern Germany and the allied and occupied territories of the Axis, and giving close support to German and Italian land forces. Later during the war various units served with German forces based at Spilve, near Riga (Reichskommissariat Ostland), on the northern Russian Front, amongst others in the central and south area (Crimea) on the front.

The ANR, after the 1943 armistice that divided Italy, received numbers of Italian aircraft, later augmented with their own local production, and further aircraft from Germany. This force was opposed to the Italian Co-Belligerent Air Force (Aviazione Cobelligerante Italiana, or ACI, or Aeronautica Cobelligerante del Sud), the Italian pro-Allied air force, though they never actually met in combat.

Combat operations began in December 1943, leading, in the following January, to the attack performed by the 1st Squadriglia "Asso di Bastoni", against a formation of US P-38 Lightnings, three of which were shot down. Starting from June 1944, ANR started to receive Messerschmitt Bf 109G-6s for its fighter force. From October 1944 to February 1945, when the 1st Fighter Group "Asso di Bastoni" returned from training in Germany, 2nd Fighter Group "Gigi Tre Osei" was the only ANR fighter unit active in the defence of the northern Italian territory. From mid-1944, the casualty ratio started to outbalance the victories of the Italian pilots. The last interception missions were carried out on 19 April 1945.

Bomber units included the Gruppo Aerosiluranti "Buscaglia Faggioni", led by Carlo Faggioni and named after Carlo Emanuele Buscaglia who, at the time, was presumed dead but was instead held in an Allied Prisoner of War camp and later fought with the Aeronautica Cobelligerante. The unit, using old Savoia-Marchetti SM.79, performed several raids against the Allied bridgehead of Anzio. Its only two recorded victories were the sinking of a British transport ship north of Benghazi (at the time the group was based in Greece), and an enemy cargo vessel off Rimini on 5 February 1945.

The first Chief of Staff of the ANR was Colonel Ernesto Botto, replaced in March 1944 by General Arrigo Tessari, who in turn was replaced by Colonel Ruggero Bonomi in August of the same year.

Fuselage and tail flag of the A.N.R. used from October 1943 to May 1945.

== Units ==
- 1° Gruppo Caccia Asso di Bastoni
  - 1ª Squadriglia "Asso di bastoni"
  - 2ª Squadriglia "Vespa incacchiata"
  - 3ª Squadriglia "Arciere"
- 2° Gruppo Caccia "Gigi Tre Osei"
  - 1ª Squadriglia “Gigi Tre Osei”
  - 2ª Squadriglia “Diavoli Rossi”
  - 3ª Squadriglia “Gamba di Ferro”, later "Diavoli"
- 3° Gruppo Caccia "Francesco Baracca" (never become operational)
- Squadriglia complementare d’allarme “Montefusco-Bonet”.
- Gruppo Aerosiluranti Buscaglia Faggioni
- 1° Gruppo Aerotrasporti "Trabucchi". Fought under Luftwaffe command in the Eastern Front, and was disbanded in the Summer 1944
- 2° Gruppo Aerotrasporti "Terraciano" (performed only training)

== Aircraft ==
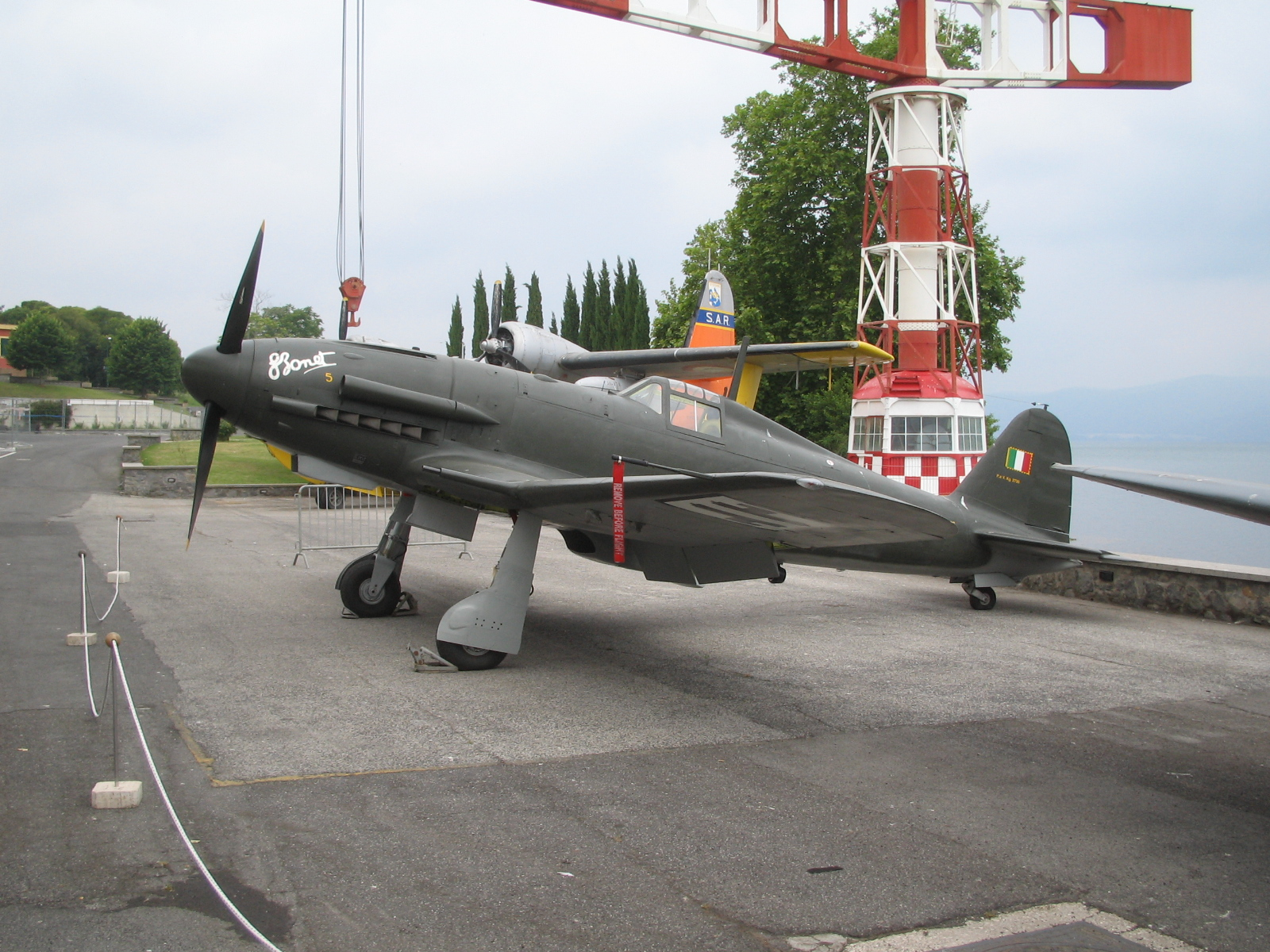
A Fiat G.55 Centauro in ANR livery on display at the Italian Air Force Museum, located on the former Vigna di Valle Air Base in Bracciano near Rome

- Ambrosini SAI.2S
- Ambrosini SAI.107
- AVIA FL.3
- Breda Ba.25
- Breda Ba.39
- Breda Ba.88 Lince
- Breda Ba.88M Lince
- CANSA FC.20bis
- CANT Z.501 Gabbiano
- CANT Z.506B Airone
- CANT Z.511
- CANT Z.1007bis Alcione
- CANT Z.1018 Leone
- Caproni Ca.133
- Caproni Ca.164
- Caproni Ca.310 Libeccio
- Caproni-Vizzola F.5
- Dornier Do 217 J-2
- Fieseler Fi 156 C-2 Storch
- Fiat CR.32 bis.
- Fiat G.8
- Fiat BR.20M Cicogna
- Fiat G.18V
- Fiat G.50bis Freccia
- Fiat RS.14B
- Fiat CR.42AS Falco
- Fiat G.12T
- Fiat G.55/I (Serie I) Centauro
- Junkers Ju 87 B-1 Picchiatello
- Junkers Ju 87 B-2 Trop.
- Junkers Ju 87 R-2
- Junkers Ju 87 R-5 Trop.
- Junkers Ju 88 A-4
- Macchi MC.200 Saetta
- Macchi MC.202 Folgore
- Macchi MC.205V Veltro
- Meridionali Ro.41
- Messerschmitt Bf 109 F-2
- Messerschmitt Bf 109 G-6
- Messerschmitt Bf 109 G-10
- Messerschmitt Bf 109 G-12
- Messerschmitt Bf 109 K-4
- Messerschmitt Bf 110 C-4
- Messerschmitt Bf 110 G-4
- Nardi FN.305
- Piaggio P.108B
- Reggiane Re.2001 Serie III Falco II
- Reggiane Re.2002 Ariete
- Reggiane Re.2005 Sagittario
- SAIMAN 202
- Savoia-Marchetti SM.75 Marsupiale
- Savoia-Marchetti SM.79 Sparviero
- Savoia-Marchetti SM.81 Pipistrello
- Savoia-Marchetti SM.82 Marsupiale
- Savoia-Marchetti SM.84
- Savoia-Marchetti SM.95

== See also ==
- Regia Aeronautica
- Aeronautica Cobelligerante del Sud
- Esercito Nazionale Repubblicano
- Marina Nazionale Repubblicana

== Sources ==
- D'Amico, F. and G. Valentini. Regia Aeronautica Vol. 2: Pictorial History of the Aeronautica Nazionale Repubblicana and the Italian Co-Belligerent Air Force, 1943-1945. Carrollton, Texas: Squadron/Signal Publications, Inc., 1986. ISBN 0-89747-185-7.
- Sgarlato, Nico. Italian Aircraft of World War II. Warren, Michigan: Squadron/Signal Publications, Inc., 1979. ISBN 0-89747-086-9.
- Matricardi, Paolo. The Concise History of Aviation. New York: Crescent Books, 1985. ISBN 0-517-47137X
