= Rabagliati =

Rabagliati (pronounced [rabaʎˈʎaːti]) is an Italian surname. Notable people with the surname include:

- Alberto Rabagliati (1906–1974), Italian singer
- Alexander Rabagliati (1914–1943), Scottish flying ace of the RAF during WW2, grandson of Andrea and Helen
- Andrea Rabagliati (1843–1930), Scottish physician and writer
- Helen Rabagliati (1851–1934), Scottish campaigner for improvements in women's health, wife of Andrea
- Euan Rabagliati (1892–1978), English soldier, pilot, racing driver and intelligence officer, son of Andrea and Helen
- Michel Rabagliati (born 1961), Canadian cartoonist

== See also ==
- Rebagliati
