= Leonardo Ferrulli =

Italian World War II flying ace

- Born: 1 January 1918; Brindisi, Italy
- Died: 5 July 1943 (aged 25); Scordia, Sicily, Italy
- Military career
- Allegiance: Italy
- Branch: Regia Aeronautica; Aviazione Legionaria
- Service years: 1935–1943
- Rank: Sottotenente
- Units: 91a Squadriglia, 10° Gruppo, 4° Stormo
- Conflicts: Spanish Civil War; Second World War
- Awards: Medaglia d'Oro al Valor Militare; Medaglia d'Argento al Valor Militare

Leonardo Ferrulli (1 January 1918 – 5 July 1943) was an ace of the Regia Aeronautica, and a recipient of the Medaglia d'Oro al Valor Militare (Gold Medal of Military Valor). He was credited with 22 air victories, one during the Spanish Civil War and 21 during World War II. He shot down Hurricanes, P-40s, P-38 Lightnings, Spitfires and B-17s, flying Fiat C.R.42 biplanes and Macchi C.200/202 monoplanes. His unit was 91a Squadriglia, 10° Gruppo, from 4° Stormo, one of the top-scoring fighter units of Regia Aeronautica.

== Early life ==
Ferrulli was born in Brindisi on 1 January 1918. In 1935, he enrolled in the air force, entering flight training at the Benevento Flight School before the age of 18 years. After completing his training as a military pilot, he was assigned to the 4° Stormo.

== Spain ==
In February 1937, Ferrulli volunteered to fight in Spain as part of the Aviazione Legionaria. He served in the 101a Squadriglia of X Gruppo Caccia Baleari. On 7 October 1937, during the Spanish Civil War, Ferrulli shot down a Tupolev SB flying a Fiat CR.32. The Republican bomber fell into the sea off Palma de Mallorca. For this victory he was awarded the Medaglia d'Argento al Valore militare (Silver Medal of Military Valor).

== World War II ==
In World War II, Ferrulli was in North Africa when he achieved his first air victory on 19 December 1940. That day, his unit (10° Gruppo, flying Fiat CR. 42s) was escorting some Savoia-Marchetti SM.79s of 41° Stormo in the sky above Sollum, when a formation of Hawker Hurricanes attacked the bombers. In the dogfight that followed, Sergente Maggiore Ferrulli was credited with a Hurricane destroyed (one of the rare individual victories assigned by 10° Gruppo) and another damaged, but his Fiat was hit in the engine and he had to make an emergency landing near Bardia. Ferrulli was unhurt and returned to his unit on 22 December. In North Africa he shot down five more Hurricanes and a Bristol Blenheim, still flying the nimble Fiat biplane.

After the attack against Yugoslavia, Ferrulli, along with 10° Gruppo (now equipped with the Macchi C.200s delivered by 54° Stormo), moved to Sicily for operations against Malta.

On 11 July 1941, with fellow pilots of his Gruppo, Ferrulli took part in the attack against the Maltese base of Mqabba. He was one of the Comandante Romagnoli's wingmen. Flying above the sea after strafing the airfield, Ferrulli saw fellow pilot Devoto being pursued by two Hurricanes. He and Franco Lucchini turned back to give help but four or five more Hurricanes arrived on the scene and a violent dogfight ensued. The three Macchis were forced to disengage by flying very low over the sea, chased by the British fighters for about 30–40 km. Ferrulli's Macchi was hit many times and was heavily damaged, but he was unscathed. The attack on Mqabba was regarded as a success and mentioned in the Bollettino di Guerra (War Bulletin) n.402.

At the end of 1941, 4° Stormo was equipped with the new and more effective Macchi C.202. During 1942 Ferrulli shot down eight P-40s and a Spitfire, and on December of that year was promoted Sottotenente (Second Lieutenant) for war merits.

== Death ==
Ferrulli made his two last kills on the very day of his demise, 5 July 1943, in the sky of Sicily. At 14:20, few hours after the death of his friend (and fellow "ace") Franco Lucchini, Ferrulli, Tenente Giorgio Bertolaso and Sergente Giulio Fornalé, also from 91a Squadriglia, took off from Sigonella to intercept a squadron of B-17s escorted by P-38s and Spitfires. He was seen shooting down a four-engined American bomber from which three men bailed out, and then a twin-engined P-38 fighter. However, immediately thereafter, Ferrulli was attacked by Spitfires. His Macchi was hit and he bailed out; too low for his parachute to open. Ferrulli was killed, hitting the ground near Scordia (Catania).

The identity of the Allied pilot who shot down the then-top-scoring Italian ace is unknown; it was possibly Pilot Officer Chandler (JK139/V-X), who claimed to have damaged a Macchi during that combat, or Flight Sergeant F. K. Halcombe (JK368/V-J) from 1435 Squadron, who claimed to have hit a Messerschmitt Bf 109 (the two Axis fighters looked very similar to one another), or Flying Officer Geoff White (JK611/MK-M) from 126 Squadron that shot down a Macchi, but his victim was more likely Sergente Maggiore Corrado Patrizi from 84a Squadriglia who parachuted successfully from his damaged Macchi C.205.

== Awards ==
Ferrulli was awarded a posthumous Medaglia d’oro al valor militare and three Silver medals.
