= Alexander Rabagliati =

Scottish World War II flying ace

Alexander Coultate Rabagliati
- Born: 11 April 1914; Scotland
- Died: 6 July 1943 (aged 29) off the Dutch coast, North Sea
- Relatives: Andrea Rabagliati (grandfather); Helen Priscilla McLaren (grandmother); 1. Euan Rabagliati (uncle)
- Military career
- Branch: Royal Air Force
- Rank: Wing Commander
- Nickname: 'Sandy'
- Commands: No. 46 Squadron; No. 126 Squadron; Ta Kali Wing; RAF Fairwood Common; Coltishall Wing
- Conflicts: Second World War: Battle of Britain; Siege of Malta
- Awards: Distinguished Flying Cross & Bar

Alexander Coultate Rabagliati DFC & Bar (14 April 1914 – 6 July 1943), known as Sandy, was a Scottish flying ace of the Royal Air Force (RAF) during the Second World War. He is credited with having destroyed at least seventeen aircraft.

Of Italian descent, Rabagliati joined the RAF in 1935 and once his training was completed, joined No. 1 Squadron. He later served with No. 27 Squadron in India. At the time of the outbreak of the Second World War, he was a flight lieutenant at an anti-aircraft training unit. Undergoing training on the Hawker Hurricane fighter in May 1940, he was posted to No. 46 Squadron and achieved many aerial victories during the Battle of Britain. He led the squadron from late 1940 until May 1941, at which he and the rest of the pilots were transferred to Malta to become the basis of No. 126 Squadron. He destroyed many aircraft during the siege of Malta, rising to lead the fighter wing at Ta Kali. Back in the United Kingdom by April 1942, he carried out staff duties for a time and commanded a RAF station before being appointed a wing leader at RAF Coltishall. He died on 6 July in the course of a sortie to attack shipping off the Dutch coast.

== Early life ==
Born in Scotland on 14 April 1914, Alexander Coultate Rabagliati, known as Sandy, was the grandson of the well-known doctor Andrea Rabagliati and Helen Rabagliati. He was of Italian descent; his great grandfather was from Genoa but immigrated to Scotland and married a pastor's daughter. Rabagliati spent some of his childhood in South Africa, where his father worked for a time but was mostly educated in England, attending Westerleigh School in St Leonards-on-Sea before going onto Charterhouse School.

Rabagliati joined the RAF on a short service commission in April 1935, and trained at No. 2 Flying Training School at Digby. After gaining his wings, in April 1936 he was posted to No. 1 Squadron as a pilot officer. At the time of his posting, the squadron was based at Tangmere and operated the Hawker Fury fighter. At the end of the year, Rabagliati was posted to No. 27 Squadron in India. This operated Westland Wapiti biplanes along the Northwest frontier with Waziristan in a policing role.

Returning to England in early 1939, Rabagliati was assigned to No. 1 Anti-Aircraft Co-operation Unit, where he was a flight commander. His duties were flying Westland Wallace biplanes towing target drogues for training anti-aircraft gunners. He was promoted to flight lieutenant in March 1939.

== Second World War ==
In May 1940 Rabagliati went to No. 6 Operational Training Unit at Sutton Bridge where he trained on the Hawker Hurricane fighter. Following this, he was posted to No. 46 Squadron. The unit was based at Digby and in a reformation period as it had lost a number of its flying personnel in the Norwegian campaign. At the time it was mostly engaged in night patrols and interception duties with its Hurricanes.

=== Battle of Britain ===
Rabagliati, leading a section of Hurricanes, achieved his first aerial victories on 18 August, now known as The Hardest Day of the Battle of Britain, when he shot down one Messerschmitt Bf 110 heavy fighter and probably destroyed a second near Chelmsford. His section was the only aircraft from No. 12 Group to be involved in the fighting that day.

At the start of September No. 46 Squadron moved south to Stapleford to assist the fighter squadrons of No. 11 Group in countering the Luftwaffe's campaign over southeast England. On 2 September Rabagliati's Hurricane was damaged in an engagement with Messerschmitt Bf 109 fighters over Kent, and he had to crash land his aircraft. The next day he switched to an experimental cannon-equipped Hurricane and flying this aircraft, damaged a pair of Junkers Ju 88 medium bombers to the west of Southend-on-Sea. He destroyed a Messerschmitt Bf 109 fighter to the south of Sheppey on 5 September, again flying the cannon-equipped Hurricane. Two days later he damaged a pair of Dornier Do 17 medium bombers over Thameshaven. On 14 September he shot down a Bf 109 near Biggin Hill and then on 18 September claimed a Do 17 as probably destroyed near the Thames estuary.

On 27 September Rabagliati shot down two aircraft near Maidstone, respectively a Bf 110 and a Ju 88. He was awarded the Distinguished Flying Cross (DFC) on 22 October 1940; the citation, published in The London Gazette, read:

This officer has led his flight and squadron in many engagements against the enemy during which he has destroyed five enemy aircraft and damaged others. He has shown magnificent leadership and courage.

— London Gazette, No. 34976, 22 October 1940

The pace of operations had slowed by this time but No. 46 Squadron still continued to have engagements with the Luftwaffe. Rabagliati destroyed a Bf 109 over Maidstone on 29 October, and then another Bf 109 on 8 November, this time over the English Channel, about 10 miles (16 km) from Dover. He took command of the squadron in December, by which time it was back at Digby. No. 46 Squadron saw no action for the next few months, but Rabagliati was promoted to squadron leader during this time.

=== Siege of Malta ===
In May 1941 No. 46 Squadron's flying personnel were sent to Malta where at the end of the following month they became the basis for a new No. 126 Squadron, with Rabagliati as its commanding officer. The island was under aerial siege by the Regia Aeronautica (Royal Italian Air Force), which sent bombers escorted by fighters to Malta on a daily basis. Operating from Ta Kali, the squadron's pilots were quickly in action even before the official formation of No. 126 Squadron, with Rabagliati sharing with three other pilots in the destruction of an Italian avoia-Marchetti SM.79 medium bomber to the east of Filfla on 11 June. The next day he shot down a Fiat CR.42 fighter about 15 miles (24 km) from Grand Harbour. On 22 June he destroyed a Macchi C.200 fight to the north of Malta and three days later probably destroyed a SM.79 several miles from Kalafrana. He damaged another SM.79 on 27 June and destroyed a MC.200, over Ta Kali and east of Malta respectively.

As well as its defensive duties, No. 126 Squadron also carried out occasional offensive sorties to Sicily. On one of these, carried out on 9 July, several flying boats were caught on the water at Syracuse, and were destroyed by Rabagliati and other pilots of the squadron. Several other flying boats were damaged. On 10 August, Rabagliati destroyed a CANT Z.506 flying boat over Malta and a week later, on a sortie back to Syracuse, destroyed another Z.506 on the water. On 20 August, flying to Augusta in Sicily, he damaged a Z.506 on the water and also destroyed four barrage balloons. He shot down a MC.200 to the southeast of Cap Scaramia on 26 August and another of the same type on 4 September, this time in the vicinity of Grand Harbour. In October he was promoted to acting wing commander and appointed leader of the Ta Kali Wing. At the end of the month he was awarded a Bar to his DFC.

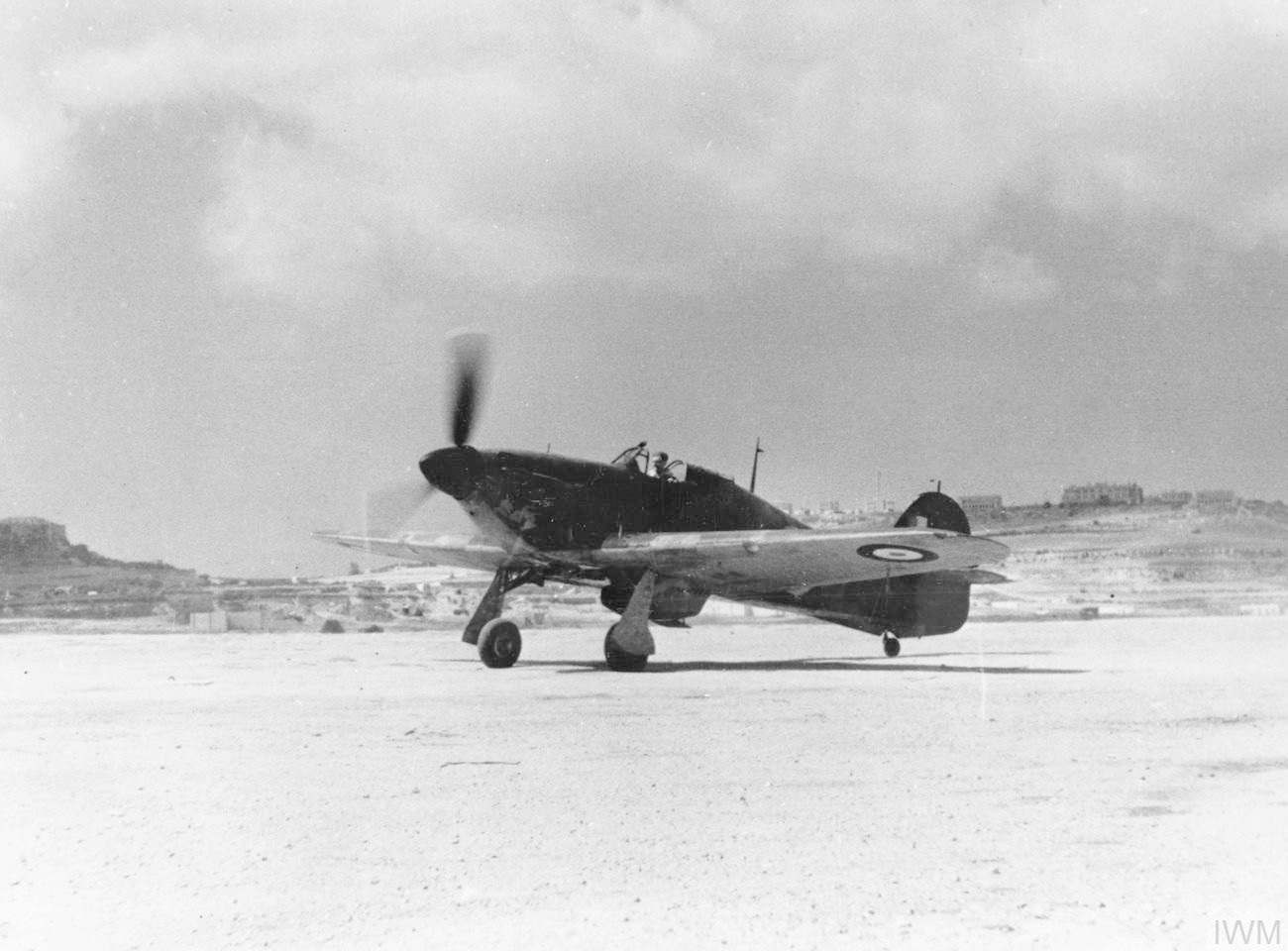
A Hawker Hurricane on the airfield at Ta Kali

Leading the Ta Kali Wing on a sortie to Sicily on 12 November, Rabagliati destroyed a CR.42 on the ground at Gela airfield and also shot down a Junkers Ju 87 dive bomber. A Macchi C.202 fighter was destroyed over Malta by Rabagliati on 21 December. By early 1942, the island was under heavy attack, with as many as seven raids a day being mounted with the Luftwaffe now involved in addition to the Italians. Rabagliati damaged a Ju 88 on 17 January and another to the north of Gozo on 11 February. The latter was subsequently destroyed by other pilots. He shot down a Bf 109 over Malta on 15 February and probably destroyed another on 9 March. This was his last claim while serving at Malta for a week later he was returned to the United Kingdom via Egypt and South Africa.

=== Later war service ===
After four weeks of leave, Rabagliati was posted to the headquarters of Fighter Command, working on fighter tactics for several weeks. By this time, his wing commander rank was made substantive. He then took a course at the RAF Staff College before, in October, being appointed commander of the RAF station at Fairwood Common. In May 1943 he became wing leader at Coltishall, regularly leading Supermarine Spitfire fighter wings escorting Allied bombers on sorties to German-occupied Europe.

Rabagliati's command also included Hawker Typhoon fighter-bomber squadrons and on 6 July, he was flying with Nos. 195 and 56 Squadrons on a sortie to attack shipping off the Dutch coast. His Typhoon was hit by flak and he bailed out over the North Sea. Despite several search and rescue missions, including one by his brother, a Coastal Command pilot, he was not found. He has no known grave and is commemorated on the Runneymeade Memorial at Englefield Green.

Rabagliati is credited with having shot down seventeen aircraft, one being shared with other pilots, and four balloons. He probably destroyed four additional aircraft, and damaged several others. He also destroyed several aircraft on the ground or water; eight in total although six of these were shared.
