= Rebagliati =

Rebagliati pronounced [rebaʎˈʎaːti]) is an Italian surname. Notable people with the surname include:

- Chiara Rebagliati (born 1997), Italian archer
- Edgardo Rebagliati (1895–1958), Peruvian lawyer and journalist, Minister of Public Health
- Raúl Ferrero Rebagliati (1911–1977), Peruvian politician and Prime Minister
- Ross Rebagliati (born 1971), Canadian snowboarder

== See also ==
- Edgardo Rebagliati Martins National Hospital
- Rabagliati
