= Teresio Vittorio Martinoli =

Italian World War II fighter pilot

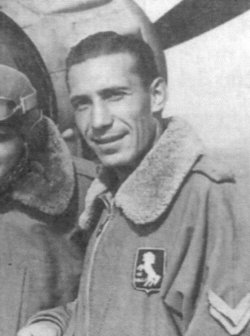
- Born: 26 March 1917; Novara, Italy
- Died: 25 August 1944 (aged 27)
- Military career
- Allegiance: Italy
- Branch: Regia Aeronautica; Aeronautica Militare Italiana
- Service years: 1938 – 1944
- Rank: Sergente Maggiore
- Units: 366ª Squadriglia, 151° Gruppo, 53° Stormo (RA); 384ª Squadriglia, 157° Gruppo; 78ª Squadriglia, 13° Gruppo, 2° Stormo; 9° Gruppo, 4° Stormo
- Conflicts: Second World War
- Awards: Medaglia d'Oro al Valor Militare; Medaglia d’Argento al Valor Militare; German Iron Cross second class

Teresio Vittorio Martinoli, MOVM, (26 March 1917 – 25 August 1944) was an Italian World War II fighter pilot in the Regia Aeronautica and in the Italian Co-Belligerent Air Force (ICBAF). During the war, he fought over Libya and Tunisia, in North Africa, on Malta, and was involved in the defence of the Italian mainland. Martinoli has been credited with 22 air victories and 14 shared destroyed in 276 sorties. Flying the Fiat C.R.42 biplane and Macchi C.202 and C.205 monoplanes, he shot down: a Gloster Gladiator, Bristol Blenheims, Hawker Hurricanes, Curtiss P-40s, Spitfires, a P-38 Lightning, a Boeing B-17 Flying Fortress, and a Junkers Ju 52, the last after the Armistice of Cassibile.

He lost his life in a flying accident on 25 August 1944, while converting from the C.205 to the P-39 Airacobra.

== Before World War II ==
Martinoli gained a glider pilot's licence in 1937. The following year, he was enlisted in the Regia Aeronautica, and after a military flying course at Ghedi, was assigned to 366ª Squadriglia of 151° Gruppo (53°Stormo) with the rank of Sergente Pilota. Subsequently, he was posted to the 384ª Squadriglia, 157° Gruppo, stationed in Trapani, Sicily.

== Theatres of war ==
=== North Africa ===
He claimed his first air victory, just three days after Italy entered the war, on 13 June 1940. His apparent first victim was a bomber, most probably a French Potez 630, shot down over Tunis, while flying his Fiat CR.42. This encounter is unverified from any other source however Martinoli's own log book has a precise attesting entry in it. Then he was posted to 78ª Squadriglia, 13° Gruppo of 2° Stormo and on 13 October he claimed a Gloster Gladiator (most probably from No. 112 Squadron RAF), while escorting a Savoia-Marchetti S.79, to Mersa Matruh, Egypt. Having transferred to 4° Stormo, Martinoli claimed a Bristol Blenheim shot down in the Bardia, Libya zone on 5 January 1941.

=== Malta ===
After he had transferred to 4° Stormo (which became his permanent unit), in autumn 1941 Martinoli flew fighter sweeps over Malta, from Comiso in Sicily. Flying the Macchi C.202, in just two months, he claimed three Hurricanes (two on 19 October 1941) and a Blenheim. Still over Malta, he was credited with the destruction of three Spitfires (plus one probable) between 4 and 16 May 1942. Back in North Africa, during the Battle of Bir Hacheim, on 9 June 1942, he shot down two P-40 fighters and damaged a third. On 29 June, in Marsa Matruh area, along with three more 73ª Squadriglia Macchi C.202s, he attacked a formation of 12 P-40s, downing a Curtiss fighter (while his fellow pilots shot down two more). Martinoli's final kill in the North Africa theatre was over El Daba on 23 October 1942. Officially, this was identified as a Bell P-39 Airacobra but was more likely a Curtiss Kittyhawk from No. 260 Squadron RAF.

== Home Defence ==
During the summer of 1943, he took part in the defence of Sicily and Italy.

On 4 July, he claimed a P-38 Lightning and a shared Boeing B-17 Flying Fortress over Sicily.

== Aeronautica Co-Belligerante ==
After the armistice of 8 September, he joined the Aeronautica Co-Belligerante (Co-Belligerent Air Force), fighting alongside the Allies. He flew, with other 4° Stormo pilots, sorties to Yugoslavia, attacking the German Wehrmacht and Luftwaffe. He shot down a Junkers Ju 52/3m over Podgorica, on 1 November 1943, after a dogfight with two Messerschmitt Bf 109s. It was his last air victory.

He was killed in a flying accident on 25 August 1944, at Campo Vesuvio air base, while training on one of the second-hand Bell P-39s that had just been delivered to the Co-Belligerent Air Force.

== Awards ==
Martinoli was posthumously awarded the Medaglia d'oro al Valor Militare (Gold Medal of Military Valor). He had been previously decorated with two silver medals and the German Iron Cross Second Class.

== Bibliography ==
- "Caccia Assalto 3." Dimensione Cielo Aerei italiani nella 2° guerra mondiale (in Italian). Rome: Edizioni Bizzarri, 1972.
- Duma, Antonio (2007). Quelli del Cavallino Rampante – Storia del 4º Stormo Caccia Francesco Baracca (in Italian). Roma: Aeronautica Militare – Ufficio Storico.
- Lioy, Vincenzo. Gloria senza allori (in Italian). Roma: Associazione Arma Aeronautica, 1953.
- Lazzati, Giulio. Ali nella tragedia (in Italian). Milano: Mursia, 1970.
- Lazzati, Giulio. I soliti Quattro gatti (in Italian). Milano: Mursia, 1965.
- Massimello, Giovanni (July 2001). "Teresio Martinoli, l'as discret" [Teresio Martinoli, the Quiet Ace]. Avions: Toute l'Aéronautique et son histoire (in French) (100): 31–34. ISSN 1243-8650.
- Massimello, Giovanni and Giorgio Apostolo. Italian Aces of World War Two. Oxford: Osprey Publishing, 2000. ISBN 978-1-84176-078-0.
- Neulen, Hans Werner. In the Skies of Europe. Ramsbury, Marlborough, UK: The Crowood Press, 2000. ISBN 1-86126-799-1.
- Palermo, Michele, Eagles over Gazala - air battles on North Africa May–June 1942, Roma: IBN Editore, 2014. ISBN 88-7565-168-X.
- Pesce, Giuseppe and Giovanni Massimello. Adriano Visconti Asso di guerra (in Italian). Parma: Albertelli editore s.r.l., 1997.
- Sgarlato, Nico. C.202 Lo chiamavano il Macchi (in Italian). Parma: Delta Editrice, 2008.
- Sgarlato, Nico. "Macchi Folgore" (in Italian). Aerei Nella Storia 1998 (8): 8-20. Parma, Italy: West-Ward sas.
- Shores, Christopher. Air Aces. Greenwich, CT: Bison Books, 1983. ISBN 0-86124-104-5.
