= Macchi C.202 Folgore =

WWII Italian Fighter Aircraft

C.202 Folgore
- An early Macchi C.202 (no radio mast) of 81ª Squadriglia, 6° Gruppo, 1° Stormo CT, likely in Libya

General information
- Type: Fighter
- Manufacturer: Macchi Aeronautica
- Designer: Mario Castoldi
- Status: Out of service
- Primary users: Regia Aeronautica Air Force of the Independent State of Croatia; Luftwaffe
- Number built: 1,150

History
- Introduction date: July 1941
- First flight: 10 August 1940
- Retired: 1951
- Developed from: Macchi C.200
- Developed into: Macchi C.205

The Macchi C.202 Folgore (Italian "thunderbolt") is an Italian fighter aircraft developed and manufactured by Macchi Aeronautica. It was operated mainly by the Regia Aeronautica (RA; Royal Italian Air Force) in and around the Second World War. According to aviation author David Mondey, the Folgore has been considered to be one of the best wartime fighters to serve in large numbers with the Regia Aeronautica.

The C.202 was designed by a team headed by the company's chief of design, Italian aeronautics engineer Mario Castoldi. As per company tradition, Macchi aircraft designed by Mario Castoldi received the "C" letter in their model designation, hence the Folgore is commonly referred to as the C.202 or MC.202. The C.202 was a development of the earlier C.200 Saetta, powered by an Italian-built version of the German Daimler-Benz DB 601Aa engine and featuring a redesigned fuselage for greater streamlining.

During July 1941, the Folgore went into service with the Regia Aeronautica. In combat, it very quickly proved itself to be an effective and deadly dogfighter against its contemporaries. During its service life, the C.202 was deployed on all fronts in which Italy was involved. During late 1941, it commenced offensive operations over Malta and in North Africa, where Italian and German forces were engaged in heavy combat against British and later American operations. The C.202 continued to be used in North Africa as late as mid-1943, by which point the type was withdrawn to support defensive efforts in Sicily and the Italian mainland following their invasion by Allied forces. It also saw limited use on the Eastern Front. Following the 1943 Armistice with Italy, the type was mostly used as a trainer aircraft. It was also operated by Croatia.

The Macchi C.202 was flown by almost all of the most successful Italian aces. During mid-1942, in North Africa, the Folgore achieved a ratio kill/loss better than that of the Messerschmitt Bf 109. The Australian ace Clive Caldwell, who fought a wide variety of German, Italian and Japanese fighters during 1941–45, later stated that the C.202 was "one of the best and most undervalued of fighters". The type also had well-known design flaws: in particular, like the C.200, the C.202 was prone to suddenly entering dangerous spins. Its radios were also unreliable, routinely forcing pilots to communicate by waggling their wings. The C.202 was lightly armed relative to its contemporaries, with just a pair of machine guns that had a tendency for jamming. To improve its performance it was developed into its successor: the Macchi C.205 Veltro.

== Development ==
=== Origin ===
First Folgore prototype

During the 1930s, the Italian military authorities chose to adopt only radial engines to power their aircraft; consequently, during the second half of the 1930s, the Italian aeronautical industry had been sufficiently de-incentivised to the point of completely avoiding the development of more powerful engines based on streamlined liquid-cooled designs, which would become popular abroad. As a result of this preference, Italian aircraft manufacturer Macchi Aeronautica was forced to rely on the aging Fiat A.74 radial to power its C.200 fighter. However, by 1941, the C.200, which was armed with a pair of 12.7 mm (.50 in) machine guns and capable of a maximum speed of 504 km/h (315 mph), was considered to be obsolete in comparison to competitors in production overseas.

During July 1939, the Regia Aeronautica requested that Reggiane construct a single prototype Re.2000 that was powered by a German Daimler-Benz DB 601Aa, liquid-cooled supercharged inverted V-12 engine rated at 1,175 PS (1,159 hp, 864 kW); this became the Re.2001. At the time, the most powerful reliable Italian inline engine was the 715 kW (960 hp) Isotta Fraschini Asso XI R.C.40, which was designed in 1936. During November 1939, the Italian automotive company Alfa Romeo acquired a license to produce the DB 601Aa as the Alfa Romeo RA.1000 R.C.41-I Monsone; it was this engine that was to be used in the production of the C.202.

While waiting for domestic production of the engine by Alfa Romeo to ramp up, Aeronautica Macchi decided to import a single DB 601Aa engine; this was initially performed as a private venture without any state support. Macchi chief of design Mario Castoldi commenced work on mating the Macchi C.200 wings, undercarriage, vertical and horizontal tail units to a new fuselage that incorporated the imported DB 601Aa. During January 1940, formal design work on the new fighter commenced and, shortly thereafter, construction began on a single prototype of the design. Castoldi, whose background included working on Schneider Trophy racers design, followed Celestino Rosatelli as the main designer of new fighters for the RA. His new project was robust and small, utilizing a conventional but complex structural arrangement based on his experience with wooden designs, and at the same time paying great attention to its aerodynamics (Castoldi had previously designed the MC.72, the world's fastest aircraft of its time).

=== Flight testing ===
On 10 August 1940, less than seven months following the start of design work and two months after Italy's entry into the Second World War, the sole prototype conducted its maiden flight. The prototype differed in some respects from the production aircraft; the headrest fairing incorporated two windows for rear visibility, while production versions replaced this with a narrower, scalloped headrest. The square-sectioned supercharger air intake was replaced by an elongated round sectioned fairing, which was later redesigned to incorporate a dust filter. From the onset of flying trials, it was evident that the C.202 was an advanced design for the era, owing much of its performance to the use of the Daimler Benz DB 601, which represented a departure from the standard practice of using engines of Italian origin.

Following its initial flights, the prototype was flown to the Regia Aeronautica's main test airfield at Guidonia, where it reportedly met with an enthusiastic response from test pilots. A speed of 603 km/h (375 mph) was recorded during testing, while an altitude of 5,486 m (18,000 ft) was attained within the space of six minutes; in addition, little of the favourable manoeuvrability of the earlier C.200 had been lost. Another of its positive attributes was its extremely strong construction, which allowed its pilots to dive the aircraft steeply. The performance figures gathered during these tests indicated that Italy had caught up with both Britain and Germany in the field of fighter airplanes.

=== Production constraints ===
As a result of the favourable flight test reports, the C.202 was immediately ordered into production; the first examples (built by Macchi as Serie II) appearing in May 1941. However, the complexity of the structure was not well suited to mass production, and resulted in a relatively limited production rate. According to aviation author Giuseppe Ciampaglia, in comparison to the Bf 109E/F, which was rated at typically requiring 4,500–6,000 man-hours per aircraft to complete, the Macchi routinely needed in excess of 22,000 man-hours. The growth of the C.202 project was slower than that of the rival Re. 2001 effort; but, by employing both mass production techniques and less expensive advanced technologies, the production cost was slightly less than that of the Reggiane Re.2001, (525,000 lire vs 600,000); this latter, the only other DB 601 fighter in mass production, was slower and heavier (2,460/3,240 kg) but had a bigger wing and a more advanced and adaptable structure.

To expand production, the Milan-based industrial manufacturer Società Italiana Ernesto Breda was selected to also construct the C.202. Breda would eventually produce the majority of the type. SAI-Ambrosini, based in Passignano sul Trasimeno, also served as another sub-contractor on the C.202, ultimately building around 100 fighters of the type. For some time, supplies of the DB 601 engine continued to be provided directly from Germany to supplement Italian production. Throughout the type's production life, manufacturing was near-permanently constrained by the limited availability of the engine.

== Design ==
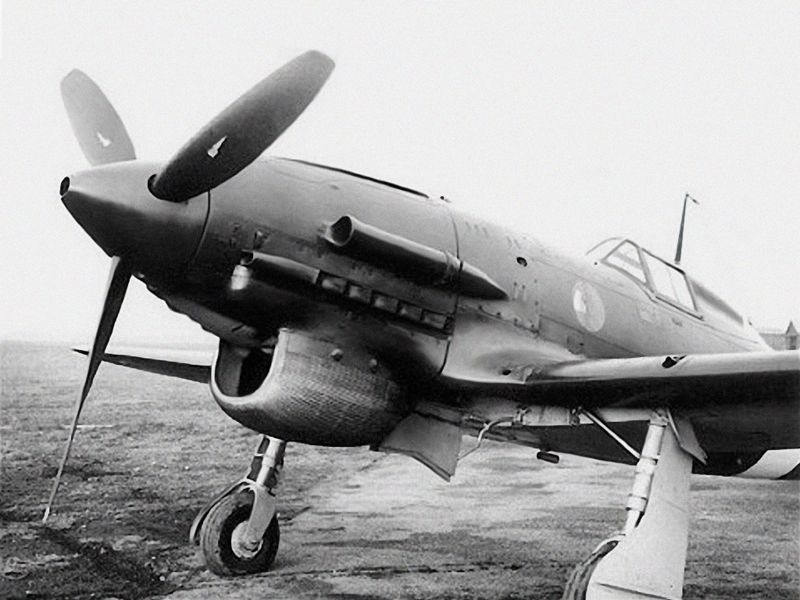
The nose of a Macchi C.202D

The Macchi C.202 Folgore was developed from the earlier C.200 Saetta, the principal differences being the use of an Italian-built version of the German Daimler-Benz DB 601Aa engine and the adoption of a revised streamlined fuselage. Both the wing and fuselage structures were metal, with a single vertical tail, and a wing of relatively conventional design with two main spars and 23 ribs. The ailerons, elevators and rudder were metal structures with fabric covering. The trailing edge of the wing inboard of the ailerons was occupied by a pair of all metal split flaps. The undercarriage had two widely set hydraulically-actuated main legs retracting inwards into recesses in the wing; the tail wheel was non-retractable.

The fuselage of the C.202 was a semi-monocoque structure, comprising four light-alloy longerons and ovoidal formers. It was significantly better streamlined than the preceding C.200 to increase performance by reducing parasitic drag. The forward section housed both the main armament and the Alfa Romeo RA.1000 R.C.41-I Monsone engine, which drove a Piaggio P1001 three-blade, variable pitch, constant speed propeller. As with the C.200, to counteract the torque of the engine Castoldi extended the left wing by 21 cm (8.5 inches) so that the left wing developed more lift, offsetting the tendency of the aircraft to roll to the left due to the rotation of the propeller. The wing was a two spar structure, attached to the fuselage center section via steel forgings; it was fitted with flaps that were both statically and dynamically balanced.

The main coolant radiator was housed in a rectangular fairing under the fuselage beneath the cockpit, and the oil cooler was placed under the nose within a streamlined, rectangular housing. From the cockpit aft, the fuselage was formed into a round monocoque structure; the aft fuselage tapered into the tail and contained the radio, oxygen and flight control mechanisms. The canopy was hinged on the starboard base and opened sideways. Behind the canopy, the pilot's headrest was fixed to a triangular turn-over pylon which was covered by a streamlined, tapered fairing. This fairing was shaped into an inverted 'T' which enabled the pilot to have a reasonable field of view to the rear. The unpressurised cockpit had an armor plate fitted behind the armored seat for protection. While early C.202s had a very short "stub" radio mast projecting from the fairing, most used a tall, slim mast.

Situated behind the engine and under the 12.7 mm (.5 in) ammunition boxes there was a single 270 L (71.3 US gal) fuel tank; all tanks were of the self-sealing variety. Another 80 L (21.1 US gal) fuel tank was placed behind the pilot, along with a pair of additional tanks, each with a capacity of 40 L (10.5 US gal), being housed in the wing roots; the total fuel capacity was 430 L (113.6 US gal). Jettisonable tanks, containing either 22 or 33 gallons of fuel, could be installed upon some of the later built aircraft.

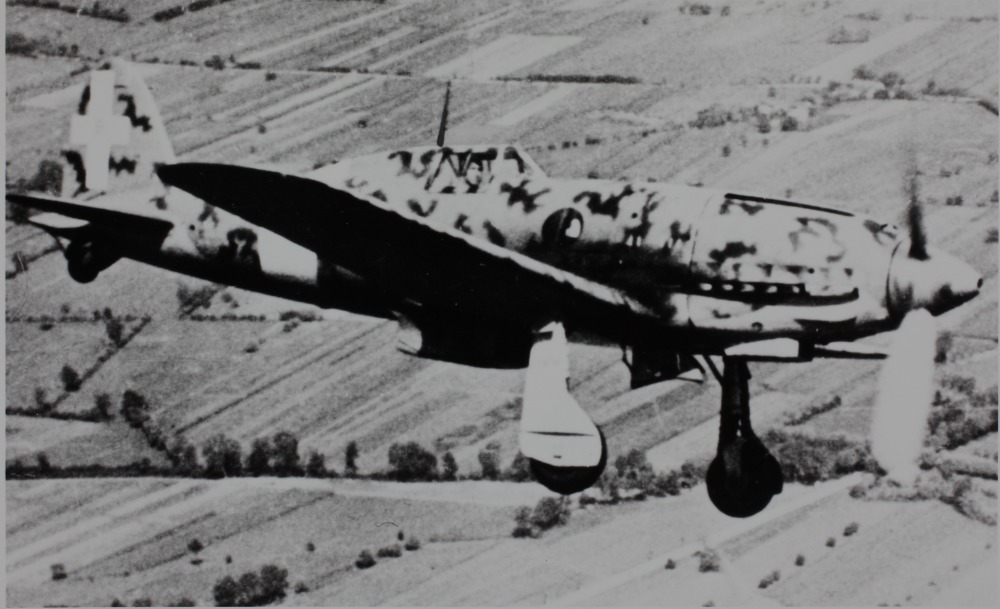
A Macchi C.202 in flight

Initially, all the armament was fitted within the nose of the Macchi. Ammunition carried was up to 800 rounds (standard: 700 rounds). An additional pair of Breda 7.7 mm (.303 in) machine guns was fitted in the wings in the VII series onward, but these, along with 1,000 rounds of ammunition, added 100 kg (220 lb) to the aircraft's weight and were typically removed by pilots to save weight, since they were relatively ineffective against most enemy aircraft in 1942. A synchronizing unit allowed the nose guns to fire through the propeller disk, but with a 25% loss in rate of fire. A "San Giorgio" reflector gun sight was fitted.

Australian air ace Clive Caldwell felt the Folgore would have been superior to the Messerschmitt Bf 109 had it been better armed. The C.202 was lightly armed by the standards of the time carrying the same armament as the C.R.32, a 1933 design. The C.202 carried as standard two 12.7 mm (.5 in) Breda-SAFAT machine guns. The Breda design was as heavy as the Browning M2, the model from which it was derived. The Breda fired 12.7x81 mm "Vickers" ammunition — while its cartridges were longer than the 13 x 64 mm rounds of its German rough equivalent, the MG 131, the 81 mm Italian rounds were still shorter than the standard 12.7x99 mm rounds of the American "Ma Deuce"; with the result that the energy at the muzzle was 10,000 joules vs. 16,000. The rate of fire was about 18 rounds/second (1,080 rounds per minute) or 0.63 kg (1.39 lb).

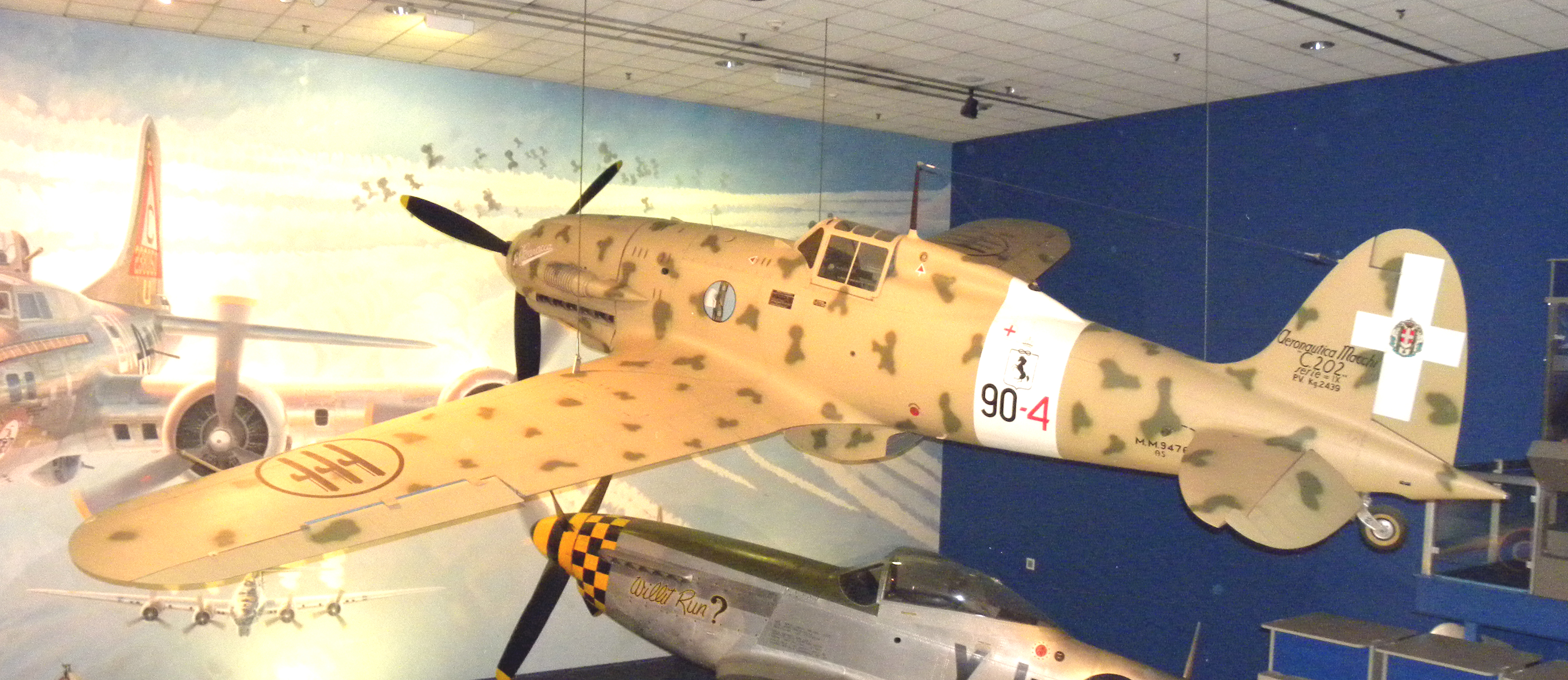
A C.202 on display at the Smithsonian's National Air and Space Museum, Washington D.C.

On 21 August 1941, Tenente Giulio Reiner, one of the most skillful and experienced pilots of 9° Gruppo, flew the "military control flight" in Lonate Pozzolo, The Ufficio tecnico (Technical Bureau) recorded the maximum speed of 1,078.27 km/h (670.01 mph) in the Folgore in a vertical dive, with 5.8 G. while pulling out of the dive. Ingegner Mario Castoldi, the designer of the 202 questioned whether Reiner had properly flown the test. In fact, during the vertical dive, Reiner had to face very strong vibrations throughout the airframe and in the control stick, while the flying controls were locked and the propeller blades were jammed at maximum pitch. The clean aerodynamics offered by the inline engine permitted dive speeds high enough for pilots to encounter the unknown phenomenon of compressibility.

The empty weight of the new C.202 (approximately 2,350 kg/5,180 lb) gradually increased throughout production, and due to the thickness of metal used it was also comparatively heavy, yet this class of aircraft was still considered lightweight compared to other contemporary fighter designs. The Macchi's mass was around 300 kg (660 lb) higher than the comparable Bf 109E German fighter, consequently, the power-to-weight ratio was considerably lower while wing loading was higher. The relatively high diving speed of the type has been attributed to the exceptionally clean design of its fuselage.

Some of the defects present on the new fighter could have been easily resolved, such as a tendency for the landing gear to inadvertently lower when pulling out of a steep dive, a machine gun bonnet that often broke, frequent jamming of the ammunition belts and the rapid crystallizing and eventual shearing of the air cleaner intake caused by vibrations generated by the engine. Other defects, such as the unreliability of the radio sets and of the oxygen systems and the limited armament could not be addressed with such ease. However, different types of radio sets and accompanying antenna were installed in some aircraft.

== Operational history ==
=== Service introduction ===
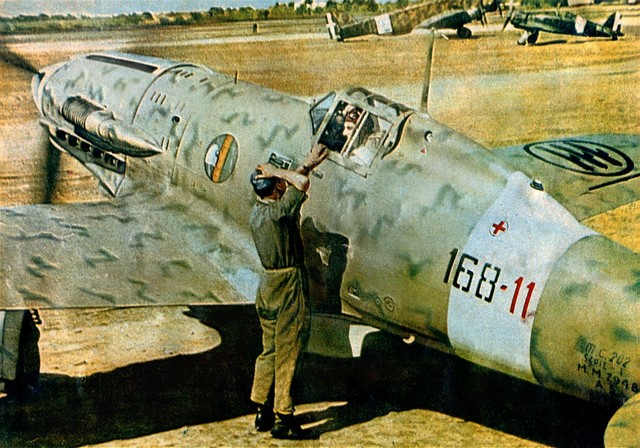
C.202 of Regia Aeronautica 168ª Squadriglia, 54° Stormo CT c. 1943

During 1940, the Folgore was put into production using imported DB 601Aa engines, while Alfa Romeo set up production of the engine under license as the RA.1000 R.C.41-I Monsone (Monsoon). Due to initial delays in engine production, Macchi resorted to completing some C.202 airframes as C.200s, powered by Fiat-built radial engines. Nevertheless, by late 1942, Folgores outnumbered all other fighter aircraft in the Regia Aeronautica.

The first units selected to be equipped with the C.202 Series I were the 17° and 6° Gruppi, from 1° Stormo, based at the airfield of Campoformido, near Udine, and the 9° Gruppo of 4° Stormo, based in Gorizia. Their pilots started to train on the new fighter in May–June 1941, at Lonate Pozzolo (Varese), the airfield of the Macchi. Although first deployed in mid-1941, the C.202 did not see action until later that year; this delay came as a consequence of the many defects that were discovered upon the first fighter deliveries. Some defects appeared similar to those on the early C. 200 version: on 3 August, during a mock dogfight, Sergente Maggiore Antonio Valle – an experienced pilot, credited with two kills in Marmarica and recipient of a Medaglia di Bronzo al Valor Militare (Bronze Medal of Military Valor) – at a height of 4,000 metres (13,000 ft) entered in a flat spin and could not recover or bail out, losing his life. The oxygen system was also regarded as being inefficient, causing, at least during the first sorties, up to 50/60 per cent of the pilots to abandon their missions and in some cases having been determined to have caused fatal accidents. By November 1941, the C.202 had appeared on the Libyan front. However, according to aviation author Gianni Cattaneo, the type may have been more of a hindrance than help in that theatre, attributing this to the pilots flying it only being semi-trained, which was in turn caused by the type being rushed into service as Axis air superiority had faded in North Africa, and a lack of spares to maintain it with. The C.202 had a better time on the home front, where supplies were more plentiful and units had more time to prepare and familiarise themselves with the type. The type was quickly put to use outside of North Africa, seeing limited service against the Soviet Union on the Eastern Front where, between 1941 and 1943, together with C.200s, the fighter reportedly achieved an 88 to 15 victory/loss ratio. However, according to authors Jeffery Ethell and Pietro Tonizzo, that ratio refers only to the C.200 "Saetta".

=== Malta ===
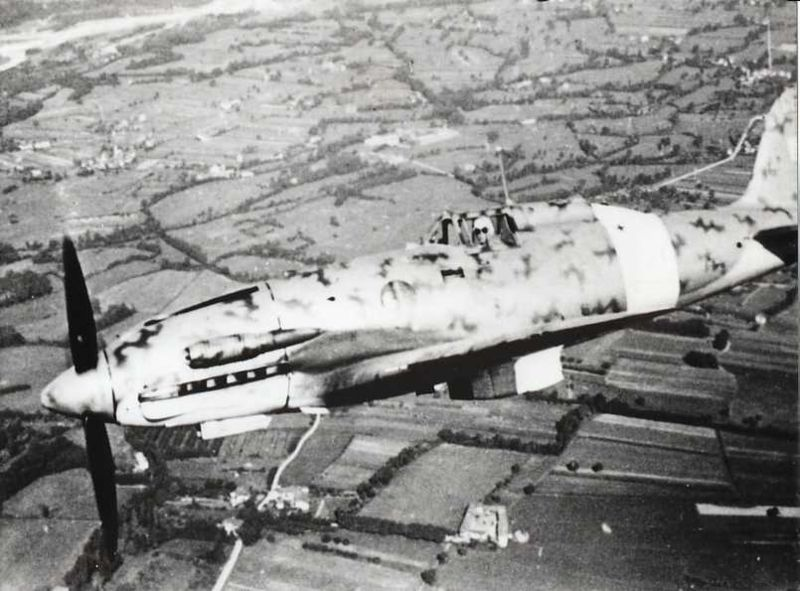
A C.202 in camouflage scheme, circa 1941

The Folgore first saw service during the Siege of Malta on 29 or 30 September 1941; their first mission was the interception of British Hurricanes over Sicily.

From early October 1941, the Italian units commenced extensive operations over Malta, which provided many opportunities for encounters with RAF fighters. From its initial combat missions, the C.202 displayed marked superiority over the Hawker Hurricane II, which formed the island's main form of aerial defence at the time. However, the Macchi's main weakness, its weak armament, proved to be a problem even at this stage. Over the skies of the besieged island, the new Macchi fighter was not only used to conduct fighter operations, but also for performing ground attack runs and aerial reconnaissance missions. Among the pilots who flew recce C.202s on Malta was Adriano Visconti, later to become a famed ace and credited with at least 10 air victories.

The presence of the Folgores in Maltese skies was to last only until the end of November, when most of the unit was transferred to the deteriorating North Africa front. The 4° Stormo returned to Sicily at the beginning of April 1942, with 10º Gruppo, to Castelvetrano. The airport was already the base of Gruppi 7º and 16º from 54º Stormo equipped with some C.202s besides the Macchi C.200s and Fiat CR.42s. The 4° Stormo C.202s flew the first sortie, on 21 April, claiming a Spitfire V, while escorting three more "recce" Macchis from 54º Stormo. The 4º Stormo flew its last mission on Malta on 19 May before moving back to North Africa. In the meantime, the 16° Gruppo had started to re-equip with the C.202s at the end of 1941. During May 1942, the Macchis of 51° Stormo and 23° Gruppo (3° Stormo) also arrived.

During Operation Harpoon, one of two simultaneous Allied convoys sent to supply Malta in the Axis-dominated central Mediterranean Sea in mid-June 1942, C.202s were involved in clashing with Sea Hurricanes. It was during this time that the Axis had to abandon their plans for the invasion of Malta, Operation Herkules (Operation C 3) due to the aircraft and men being necessary elsewhere. On 7 March 1942, the carrier USS Wasp delivered the first Spitfires to Malta, and the Axis' air-superiority started to shift in favour of the Allies. At the end of June, however, about 60 C.202s could be mustered in Sicily to operate against Malta, which had been receiving the Spitfire Mk. V in ever-increasing quantities. The Macchi could out-turn the Spitfire, but the Folgores suffered from the lack of a more powerful armament and, without radios, the Regia Aeronautica pilots were forced to communicate with one another by waggling their wings and, consequently, had to adopt formations that were too tight and less effective in combat. Their performance had also suffered due to the lack of radar, which the RAF were making extensive use of to successfully vector their fighters against their aerial opposition.

Nevertheless, the C.202's pilots were able to achieve many successes against the British Spitfires. The top scoring Italian pilots in this theatre included Capitano Furio Niclot-Doglio (a 7 kills ace, shot down and killed on 27 July 1942 by RAF ace George "Screwball" Beurling) and Sergente Ennio Tarantola. Both pilots flew with 51° Stormo C.T., the most successful Italian unit over Malta, having reportedly achieved a score of 97 aircraft destroyed for the loss of only 17 Folgores.

=== North Africa and Pantelleria ===
On 29 July 1941, the three first operational C.202s of 4° Stormo, 97ª Squadriglia, landed at Merna airport. On 26 November, during Operation Crusader, 19 Macchis of 9° Gruppo, 4° Stormo were sent to Africa, and by the end of the month the whole 1° Stormo was in Libya, both units taking part in the last stages of the British offensive that led to the raising of the siege of Tobruk, and the retreat of Italian and German troops in Cyrenaica in December. During its initial combats over the Western Desert, the Folgore was quite a surprise to British pilots and it remained a respected adversary. Squadron Leader Dennis Harry Clark, D.F.C. and A.F.C., in his book What Were They Like to Fly (1964), stated: "Sleek, supremely fast (..) the 202 was capable of out-turning our P-40s with ease; but the majority would pull away effortlessly into a climbing roll off or a roll off the top when things became at all hectic... Their aircraft was superior to ours on all counts."

In the desert war, incursions by the SAS behind enemy lines were often aimed at destroying aircraft on the ground. Macchi 202s of 1° Stormo based at Uadi Tamet had been transferred from Italy one month before and recently relocated from Bir el Merduma because the airbase was too exposed to SAS attacks. 1° Stormo had 60 fighters, 17°Gruppo around 30. In a month of combat, the latter lost a total of eight fighters to raids. On the night of 28 December 1941 the SAS managed to destroy a further nine aircraft. After this attack the Italians were forced to move their remaining aircraft well away from the front lines to avoid incurring further losses to such raids.

During 1942, Bf 109F/Gs and Macchi C.202s fought against the Allied air forces in North Africa. At the time of Rommel's offensive on Tobruk, 5ª "Squadra Aerea" ("Aviation Corps"), based in North Africa, had three Macchi wings: 1° Stormo had 47 C.202s (40 serviceable), 2° Stormo had 63 C.200s (52) while 4° Stormo had 57(47). This, coupled with the 32 Cant Z.1007s, was one of the most powerful fighter forces that the Italians fielded in the war, and constituted almost a tenth of the overall Folgore production. During April 1942 the 4° Stormo solved the frequent problems to the oxygen masks by adopting the German Dräger "oxygen apparatus" that already equipped the Bf 109s.

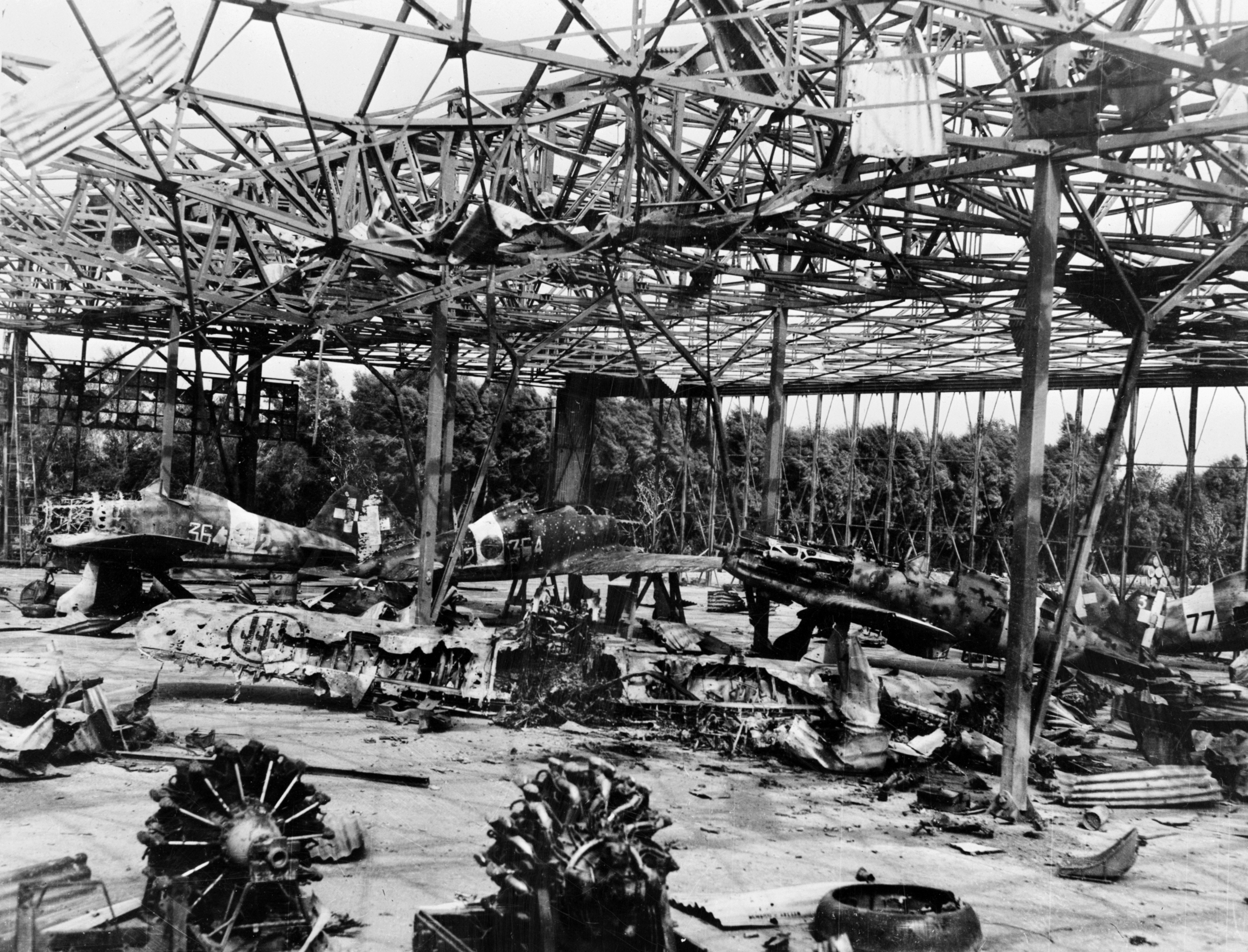
Wrecked fighters in a destroyed hangar at Tripoli-Castel Benito Airport, Tripoli, Libya, early 1943

During the Battle of Bir Hakeim the C.202s performed successfully against the assorted fighters of the Desert Air Force, typically using "dive and zoom" tactics, similar to those of Luftwaffe fighters. In the morning of 26 May, about 60 Folgore from 1° and 4° Stormo attacked Gambut airfield destroying and damaging many Allied aircraft surprised while taking off. Even if often outnumbered, the C.202s achieved 22 confirmed air victories against Hurricanes and P-40s for the loss of just five of their number, a kill/loss ratio of 4,4/1, bettering the Bf 109s' (3,5/1). On 23 December 1942, the Regia Aeronautica authorized the use of under-wing jettisonable tanks on the C.202s of 6° and 7° Gruppo based in Pantelleria, significantly boosting their endurance. By the end of the year, the growing strength of the Allied forces was overwhelming and after the defeat in the skies over Malta as well as El-Alamein the last operational Axis units lost their air superiority in the Mediterranean. The Germans and the Italians succeeded in establishing a bridgehead in Tunisia, and later in December the Regia Aeronautica transferred four fighter squadrons there; the 5ª Squadra Aerea, which had left Libya and retreated to Tunisia, had previously repatriated all unserviceable aircraft to Italy. By early 1943, Regia Aeronautica had only 54 serviceable C.202 across 12 squadrons.

By 21 February 1943 the 5ª Squadra Aerea still had the 6°Gruppo C.T. with three squadrons of C.202s at Sfax and Gammarth in the northern sector, and in the southern sector, 3°Stormo with six squadrons of C.200s and C.202s at El Hamma. Although these forces were insufficient they nevertheless achieved notable successes. On 6–7 March 1943, C.202 pilots claimed 19 RAF and two USAAF aircraft, for the loss of two Folgore. Pilots of 16° Gruppo Assalto, an attack unit, downed no fewer than 10 aircraft.

The Macchis continued fighting while retreating to Tunisia and then in the defence of Sicily, Sardinia and Italy against an increasingly stronger opponent. The Macchis of two groups at Korba were forced to concentrate 40 C.202s (both 7° and 16°, 54° Stormo), and on 8 May 1943, almost all their C.202s were destroyed on the ground by marauding Spitfires. Only eleven aircraft were repaired by 10 May 1943 and retreated to Italy. Because no transport aircraft were available every surviving fighter had two men inside, a pilot and a mechanic. At least one was destroyed and the two crewmen wounded after crash-landing on a beach near Reggio Calabria. During the Tunisian operation the Regia Aeronautica lost a total of 22 C.202s in the air and 47 on the ground.

=== Eastern Front operations ===
During May 1942, the 22° Gruppo Caccia, which had reached its operational limit, was replaced by the newly formed 21° Gruppo Autonomo C.T. composed of 356ª, 382ª, 361ª and 386ª Squadriglia. This unit, commanded by Maggiore (Major) Ettore Foschini, brought new C.202s and 18 new Macchi C.200 fighters. During August 1942, at the beginning of the German offensive, they were deployed at the Stalino, Lughansk, Kantemirovka and Millerovo airfields, typically performing ground attack strikes against the Red Army positions along the east Don river during October–November 1942. In this theatre, the fighters were operated under adverse climate conditions (40° to 45° below zero and heavy snow storms) as well as frequently coming under heavy harassment from Russian fighter-bombers. As a consequence of these operational circumstances, 21° Gruppo – which had 17 C.202s on strength – were rarely able to conduct sorties; as such, only a total of 17 missions were flown with Folgores on the Eastern Front during a four-month period.

When they were able to conduct combat operations, the C.202 were frequently used as escorts alongside their older C.200 siblings for Fiat BR.20M and Caproni Ca.311 bombers in attacks against Soviet columns, during which they would typically be facing aerial opposition from great numbers of Soviet Air Forces (VVS) fighters. The C.202 were also regularly used to escort CANT Z.1007bis during the latter's reconnaissance missions, as well as for German transport aircraft. During one such mission, on 11 December 1942, which involved the escorting of several Junkers Ju 52s en route to Stalingrad, Tenente Pilota Gino Lionello was shot down and forced to bail out from his Folgore.

After the abandonment of advanced airfields between December 1942 – January 1943 at Voroshilovgrad, Stalino and Tscerkow, the Italian air units were operated in a series of defensive actions against a more potent Soviet air offensive, consisting mainly of Ilyushin IL-2s Shturmoviks and Petlyakov Pe-2s. During March 1943, the Corpo Aereo Italiano was detached to Odessa airbase, joining Reggiane Re. 2000 Héja I of the Hungarian MKHL 1 and 2/1 Vadászszázad, as well as IAR 80C and Bf 109E/G of Romanian FARR 4 and 5 detached at the same base and Saky (Crimea) in a holding action against the VVS armada of 2,000 aircraft, at a time when the Axis air forces only countered with 300 operative aircraft, which were further constrained by having very small quantities of fuel, munitions and equipment available. On 17 January 1943, the last effective operation of Corpo Aereo Italiano in Russia occurred, when a single mixed formation of 25 surviving Macchi fighters (out of a remaining total of 30 C.200s and nine C.202s) attacked several Red Army armored and motorized infantry columns in support of German and Italian units that were encircled in Millerovo.

=== Sicilian and Italian campaigns ===
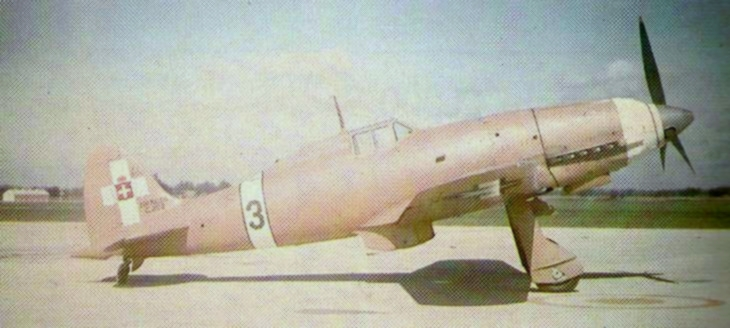
A Macchi C.202 captured during the Italian campaign of World War II being evaluated at Wright-Patterson Field outside Dayton, Ohio, for the United States Army Air Forces

The C.202s played a significant role in the defense of Sicily and Southern Italy against bombing attacks launched by the USAAF, however, by the time of Allied invasion of Sicily during July 1943, their effectiveness had been diminished considerably as a result of attrition, which had reduced the number available. Furthermore, it was increasingly recognised that 20 mm cannons were required in order to cause enough damage, thus a mixture of Bf 109F/Gs, Macchi MC.205s and Fiat G.55s were deployed to replace the remaining C.202s as soon as possible. Mixed units (such as the 51° Stormo, Sardinia) were formed with C.202s, yet were often serving with C.205s as well.

By the signing of the 1943 Armistice with Italy, there were only 186 Folgores remaining, of which roughly 100 aircraft were still considered to be in a serviceable condition. Several C.202s served with the Allied-aligned Italian Co-Belligerent Air Force, and some of these were subsequently reconstructed into C.205s or C.202/205 with the Veltro's engine. Others served as trainers in the Axis-aligned Aeronautica Nazionale Repubblicana (National Republican Air Force) of the Italian Social Republic (RSI) and the Luftwaffe (German Air Force).

=== Folgore aces ===
The Macchi C.202 was flown by almost all of the most successful Italian aces, Adriano Visconti, Leonardo Ferrulli, Luigi Gorrini, Franco Lucchini, Franco Bordoni Bisleri, Furio Niclot Doglio and top scorer Sergente Maggiore Teresio Vittorio Martinoli, credited with 22 individual "kills" plus two probables, as well as 14 shared. Seventeen of these victories were obtained in 73ª Squadriglia, 9° Gruppo (from 4° Stormo). On 25 August 1944, Martinoli was killed during a training flight with the P-39 Airacobra. Capitano Franco Lucchini, who was credited with 21/26 individual victories and 52 shared, began to fly the Folgore after having already shot down 10 enemy aircraft. On 5 July 1943, Lucchini was killed in his C.202 while attacking a B-17 over Gerbini, Sicily.

=== In Croatian service ===
About 20–22 Macchi C.202s were flown by Croatia, who typically operated them in the interceptor role against Allied bombers. During 1944, the Air Force of the Independent State of Croatia, Zrakoplovstvo Nezavisne Države Hrvatske (ZNDH), received several batches of C.202s. During January, eight brand-new Folgore fighters arrived at Zagreb's Lucko airfield. Two weeks later, another four aircraft arrived; one of these was reportedly lost during a test-flight. The first batch of 16 "Folgores" delivered to the ZNDH was from the XII series, built by Breda following the German occupation of Northern Italy. These fighters equipped Kroat. JGr 1 and retained their Luftwaffe markings whilst in service with the unit. During 1944, the Croatian Air Force Legion (HZL) fighter squadron had returned to Croatia from service on the Eastern Front. Upon its return, the HZL was redesignated Kroat. JGr 1, while its operational fighter squadron was redesignated 2./(Kroat.)JGr; this unit was equipped with Macchis. A second training / operational conversion squadron was also formed, designated 3./(Kroat.)JGr and equipped with Fiat G.50, Macchi C.200 and Fiat CR.42 fighters. During March 1944, they were scrambled for the first time against an American raid west of Zagreb but combat was avoided; Croatian Macchi pilots had been initially instructed to attack only those aircraft which had already been damaged or had become separated from their main formations.

On 24 April 1944, the first confirmed air victory was claimed by Unteroffizier Leopold Hrastovcan against an American B-24 that was shot down near the village of Zaprešić (Zagorje). According to some sources, during these first sorties, Croat C.202s claimed between 11 and 16 aerial victories, but only three further were confirmed. During May 1944, the Croatians received four C.202s from the Luftwaffe in Niš, Serbia; during the ferry flight, a single Macchi crash landed near Zemun airfield. Around June 1944, the Croat unit received the last six Folgore and three or four brand new Macchi C.205s. Irrespective of the Croatian Air Force Legion having been disbanded at the end of July, after which it was replaced by the Croatian Air Force Group (HZS), the fighters themselves remained at Borovo. During a period of intensive activity in mid-1944, the squadron had claimed some 20 Allied aircraft shot down. By late 1944, those C.202s that were still in a flight-worthy condition, based in Borovo, were used by Croatian cadets for training purposes. During September 1944, Luftwaffe pilots flew all of the remaining airworthy Folgores to Borongaj, where they were used only for training.

According to aviation authors Dragan Savic and Boris Ciglic, Croatian pilots did not at first have a high opinion of the Macchi fighter, in part due to its armament consisting of just a pair of 12.7 mm and two 7.7mm machine guns, which were regarded as scarcely effective against the heavily armed US four-engined bombers. Eastern front veteran Major Josip Helebrant, an 11-kill flying ace (used to flying Bf 109 Gs) and the CO of 2./(Kroat.)JGr, had reportedly initially regarded the Macchis as "old, weary and unusable", and described the morale of his men as "low", and his unit's results as "nil", primarily because of the NDH's underdeveloped air-raid warning system, which saw the Croatian Macchi fighters often taking off to intercept attacking Allied bombers that were already flying overhead.

=== Postwar service ===
As a consequence of the Allied aerial bombing against the Italian Social Republic, during which the manufacturing facilities of the Macchi company had sustained damage during 1944, both the production life and combat career of both the C.202 and the further refined C.205 were cut short. Post-war, some of the aircraft which had survived the conflict were joined by a small number of newly manufactured C.205s. The surviving aircraft were operated by the Aeronautica Militare Italiana, where they were used as trainer aircraft as late as 1948 before being phased out entirely.

The Royal Egyptian Air Force ordered a total of 42 C.205s, but 31 of these were in fact re-engined Folgores (C.202s), armed with only a pair of 12.7 mm Breda machine guns. Some of these aircraft later fought during the 1948 Arab–Israeli War the State of Israel; the Egyptian fighters were reportedly still in service as late as 1951. Switzerland had placed an order for 20 C.202s, however, none of these were ever delivered; this was due to the deteriorating war situation at the time (May 1943) that meant that Italy no longer had the capability to export these types of aircraft. During mid-1944, at least 12 C.202s, and probably another 12 aircraft, were delivered to the Croatian Air Force Legion for operational use against the Royal Air Force and United States Army Air Forces over Croatia, all of which being ex-LW fighters.

Those allied pilots who flew against the Folgore were frequently impressed with its performance and manoeuvrability. The C.202 was often considered to have been superior to both the British Hawker Hurricane and the American Curtiss P-40 Kittyhawk that it commonly fought against, at first on the Libyan front, as well as being the equal of the Supermarine Spitfire Mk. V. The C.202 was able to out-turn all three, although the Spitfire possessed a superior rate of climb. The C.202 could effectively fly against the Hurricane, Lockheed P-38 Lightning, Bell P-39 Airacobra, Curtiss P-40 and even the Spitfire at low altitudes, but the aircraft's combat effectiveness was somewhat hampered by its weak armament.

== Variants and production ==
Like its predecessor C.200, the C.202 had relatively few modifications, with only 116 modifications during its career, most of them invisible, externally. The total series production ordered was 1,454: 900 to Breda, 150 to SAI Ambrosini, 403 to Aermacchi. The amount produced was actually 1,106 and not 1,220 as previous stated. Breda built 649 (Series XVI deleted, Series XII and XV partially completed caused the difference); Aermacchi made 390 examples, SAI only 67.

One of the differences between prototype and series production was the lack of radio antenna and the retractable tailwheel (these differences resulting in a slightly higher top speed); the difference in speed was not so great and so, the series version had the fixed tailwheel and the radio antenna. The support for the engine, originally steel, was replaced with a lighter aluminium structure.

C.202
Starting with the Serie VII, the fighter had a new wing with a provision for two 7.7 mm (.303 in) Breda-SAFAT machine guns and an armored windscreen (previously, only the armored seat and the self-sealing tanks were provided). Serie IX's weight was 2,515/3,069 kg with the 7.7 machine guns seldom installed.

C.202AS
Dust filters for operations in North Africa (AS – Africa Settentrionale, North Africa); they affected the speed little and so, almost all Folgores had them and thus were in C.202AS standard; finally, starting with Serie XI there was a provision for two 50, 100 or 160 kg bombs, small bombs clusters (10, 15, 20 kg) or 100 L drop tanks. These underwing pylons were rarely utilized, as Folgores were needed in the interceptor roles.

C.202CB
Underwing hardpoints for bombs or drop tanks (CB – Caccia Bombardiere, Fighter-Bomber)

C.202EC
Likely standing for Esperimento Cannoni, it was another link between Veltro and Folgore. One aircraft (Serie III, s/n MM 91974) was fitted with a pair of gondola-mounted 20 mm cannon with 200 rounds each (it flew on 12 May 1943); later it was turned into a C.205V. Another four examples were so equipped, but, despite the good results in the trials (aimed to boost the Folgore's firepower), there was no further production, because the cannons penalized the aircraft's performance. There was, in the Folgore, no room to mount them inside the wings or the nose, so the MC.205V/Ns was developed. Nevertheless, the XII series could have introduced a new wing with MG 151 provisions. This is not well documented, as this series was produced by Breda after the Armistice, and was interrupted with the devastating USAAF bombings, together with many other aircraft; among them, also Macchi 205 production and the 206 prototype (30 April 1944; in five days, the USAAF destroyed both Fiat and Macchi facilities, eliminating all of Italy's fighter production).

C.202RF
Equipped with cameras for photo-reconnaissance missions (R – Ricognizione, Reconnaissance), very few produced, later the recce role was covered by Veltros.

C.202D
Prototype with a revised radiator, under the nose, similar to the P-40 (s/n. MM 7768)

C.202 AR.4
At least one such aircraft was modified to server as a "drone director" (coupled with S.79s), and it was planned to use Folgores also as 'Mistel', with an AR.4 "radiobomba" (a form of remote-control kamikaze bomber).

C.202 with DB 605 and other engines
Macchi MC.202 with DB 605 were initially known as MC.202 bis; later as the C.205 Veltro. Macchi C.200, C.202 and C.205 shared many common components. The MC.200A/2 was a MC.200 with Folgore wings (MM.8238). After the Armistice, Aeronautica Sannita or the Co-Belligerent Italian AF began MC.205 modifying C.202s with DB 605s. These aircraft were known also as Folgeltro. Around two dozen were made. Another Folgore was modified with DB 601E-1 (1,350 PS) in mid-1944, but this hybrid with Bf 109F technology crashed on 21 January 1946. The MC.204 was a version with a L.121 Asso (1,000 hp); proposed early in the war (28 September 1940), but all the effort continued only with DB 601 engines. Early Folgores had original DB 601s, while from the Serie VII, RC.41s were available.

After the war, 31 C.202 airframes were fitted with license-built Daimler-Benz DB 605 engines and sold to Egypt as C.205 Veltros, with another 11 'real' MC.205s (with MG 151 cannon in the wings).

== Operators ==
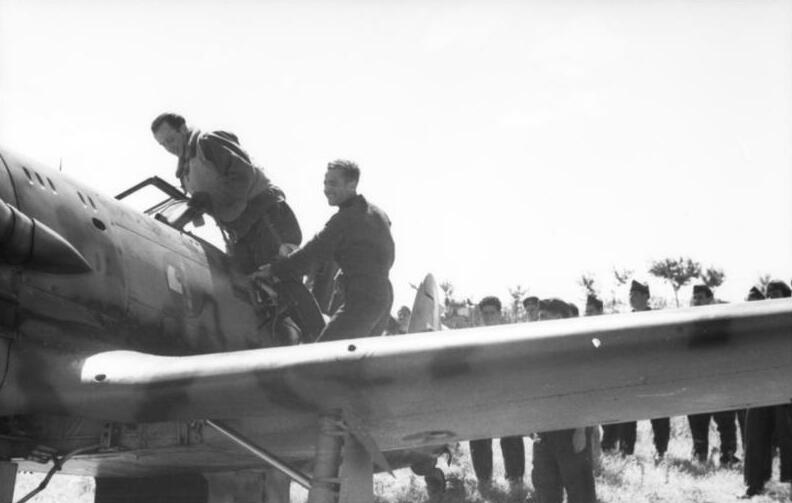
Flight crew boarding a C.202, 1943

Independent State of Croatia

- Air Force of the Independent State of Croatia

Germany

- Luftwaffe
  - II/JG 77 operated 12 captured aircraft.

Kingdom of Italy

- Regia Aeronautica
- Italian Co-belligerent Air Force

Italian Social Republic

- Aeronautica Nazionale Repubblicana

Italy

- Italian Air Force operated some Macchi C.202 until 1948

== Surviving aircraft ==
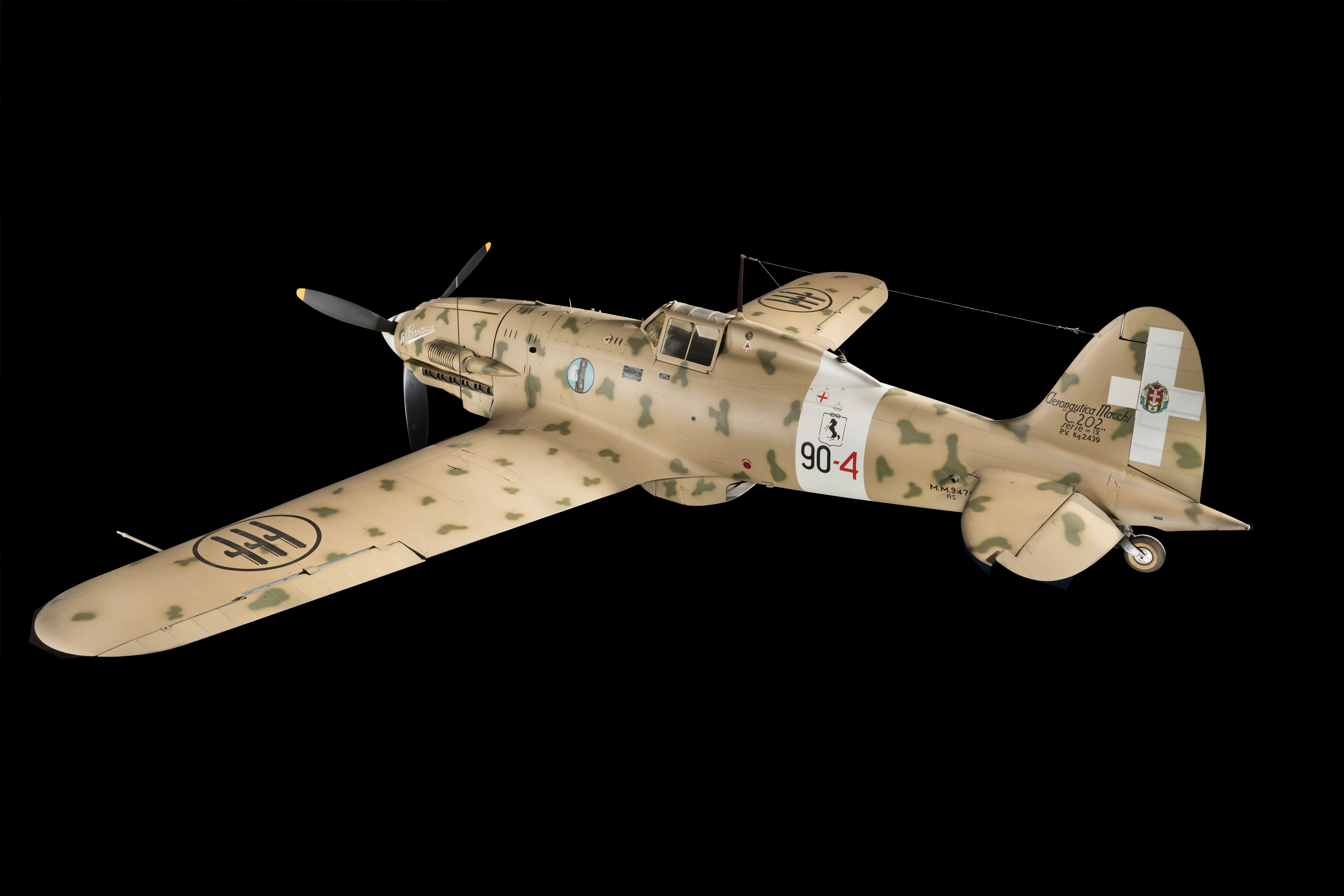
C.202 of the Smithsonian Institution

Macchi C.202 "73-7/M.M. 9667 (serial no. 366)"
Presently on display at the Italian Air Force Museum in Vigna di Valle Airport, near Bracciano, Italy. This C.202 was built by Breda in early 1943 as a Serie XI sample. In March 1943 this Folgore was assigned to 54° Stormo of the Regia Aeronautica and subsequently it served in 5° Stormo, with Aeronautica Cobelligerante (Italian Co-Belligerant Air Force). After the war it was a training aircraft at the Accademia Navale in Livorno. Currently the aircraft has the markings of the ace Giulio Reiner. Not all the parts of the aircraft are original (a panel of the engine cowling comes from a Macchi C.205 Veltro).

Macchi C.202 "M.M. 9476(?)"
Shown in the markings of the 90ª Squadriglia, 10° Gruppo, 4° Stormo, was dramatically displayed in Gallery 205 above the World War II Aviation diorama at the US National Air and Space Museum, Smithsonian, Washington, DC. Still airworthy at Freeman Field, Indiana, US, in 1945, as FE-300, was stored for many years. Restoration was completed in mid-1970. No identity marking was found, though this is the least reconstructed Folgore survivor. It may have originally been a Serie VI to IX, probably the M.M. 9476 sample.

== Specifications (C.202CB Serie IV-VIII) ==
3-view drawing of Macchi MC.202

Data from The Macchi C.202 and The Complete Book of Fighters

General characteristics

- Crew: 1
- Length: 8.85 m (29 ft 0 in)
- Wingspan: 10.58 m (34 ft 9 in)
- Height: 3.49 m (11 ft 5 in)
- Wing area: 16.82 m^{2} (181.0 sq ft)
- Airfoil: root: NACA 23018 (modified); tip: NACA 23009 (modified)
- Empty weight: 2,491 kg (5,492 lb)
- Max takeoff weight: 2,930 kg (6,460 lb)
- Drop tanks: 2 × 100 L (26.4 US gal; 22.0 imp gal) drop tanks
- Powerplant: 1 × Alfa Romeo RA.1000 R.C.41-I Monsone V-12 inverted liquid-cooled piston engine, 864 kW (1,159 hp) at 2,500 rpm for takeoff
- Propellers: 3-bladed constant-speed propeller

Performance

- Maximum speed: 600 km/h (370 mph, 320 kn) at 5,600 m (18,400 ft)
- Range: 765 km (475 mi, 413 nmi)
- Service ceiling: 11,500 m (37,700 ft)
- Rate of climb: 18.1 m/s (3,560 ft/min)
- Wing loading: 174.2 kg/m^{2} (35.7 lb/sq ft)

Armament

- 2 × 12.7 mm (0.500 in) Breda-SAFAT machine guns in the engine cowling, 360/400 rpg
- 2 × 7.7 mm (0.303 in) Breda-SAFAT machine guns in the wings, 500 rpg
- 2 × 50 kg (110 lb), 100 kg (220 lb) or 160 kg (350 lb) bombs

== See also ==
Related development

- Macchi C.200
- Macchi C.205

Aircraft of comparable role, configuration, and era

- Curtiss P-40 Warhawk
- Kawasaki Ki-61
- Lavochkin-Gorbunov-Goudkov LaGG-3
- Messerschmitt Bf 109F
- Mikoyan-Gurevich MiG-1
- Supermarine Spitfire

Related lists

- List of aircraft of World War II
- List of fighter aircraft
- List of Regia Aeronautica aircraft used in World War II
