= Franco Lucchini =

Italian flying ace

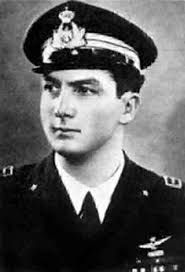
- Born: 24 December 1914; Rome, Italy
- Died: 5 July 1943 (aged 28); Catania, Sicily, Fascist Italy
- Burial place: Sacrario dell'Aeronautica Militare Italiana, Cimitero Monumentale del Verano
- Military career
- Allegiance: Italy
- Branch: Aviazione Legionaria; Regia Aeronautica
- Service years: 1936 – 1943
- Rank: tenente / capitano
- Nickname: ”Francesco Baracca della seconda Guerra mondiale”
- Units: 19^{a} Squadriglia, 23° Gruppo Caccia Aviazione Legionaria - 90^{a} Squadriglia, 84^{a} Squadriglia (4° Stormo), Regia Aeronautica
- Commands: 10° Gruppo
- Conflicts: Spanish Civil War - Second World War
- Awards: Medaglia d'Oro al Valor Militare "alla memoria" Medaglia d’Argento al valor Militare Medaglia di Bronzo al Valor Militare; Croce al Merito di Guerra; German Iron Cross second class

Franco Lucchini, MOVM, (24 December 1914 – 5 July 1943) was an Italian World War II fighter pilot in the Aviazione Legionaria and in the Regia Aeronautica. During World War II, he achieved 21 (22, according to other sources) individual air victories, plus 52 shared, to add to the five kills in Spain, during the Civil War.

He was born in Rome, the son of a railway official. When he was sixteen, he got a glider pilot's license. In 1935, he enrolled in Regia Aeronautica as a Reserve Officer, with the rank of Sottotenente Pilota di Complemento. In July 1936, he gained his military flight license at Foggia flying school. He was then commissioned (in Servizio Permanente Effettivo) on 13 August 1936 and in the same month was assigned to the 91^{a} Squadriglia, 10° Gruppo, 4° Stormo C.T. in Gorizia.

== Spain ==
Lucchini first saw action in the Spanish Civil War in 1937, with the 23° Gruppo CT. During the conflict, flying a Fiat CR.32, he claimed five air victories over Russian-built aircraft. He shot down his first enemy aircraft on 12 October 1937. That day, the 23° Gruppo, while transferring to Zaragoza, attacked four Polikarpov R-Z “Natachas” escorted by nine I-16s “Ratas” and 15 I-15 “Chaikas”. At the end of the dogfight, which lasted about fifteen minutes, the Italians claimed seven (eleven according to other sources) fighters destroyed for no losses, although several Fiat CR.32s were hit and damaged. Lucchini was credited with one kill. On 7 January 1938, he claimed a shared Polikarpov R-Z.

On 21 February, he clashed – along with 23 other Fiat CR.32 fighters – with about 40 Republican I-15 “Chatos” and I-16 “Moscas” fighters, already in combat with 17 Messerschmitt Bf 109s. Germans and Italians claimed 10 enemy aircraft – and Lucchini was credited with one kill – but the Republican losses, in fact, were two destroyed and two damaged. In Spain, he was shot down twice. The second time, on 22 July 1938, he fell to an escorting I-16 after shooting down a Tupolev SB-2 bomber, and bailing out to become a prisoner.

== World War II ==
In 1940, Lucchini was posted to 10° Gruppo of the 4° Stormo CT, flying Fiat C.R.42 biplanes, in North Africa. Here, on 14 June 1940, he shared in the destruction of a Gloster Gladiator, in the Buk Buk area. A week later, on 21 June, he shot down a Short Sunderland flying boat, in the Bardia area (most probably his "kill" was the Sunderland L2160/X of 230 Squadron piloted by Wing Commander G. Francis and Flight Lieutenant Garside, that returned to Alexandria heavily damaged by explosive bullets). On 28 July, Tenente Lucchini (with Sergente Giovanni Battista Ceoletta of the 90^{a} Squadriglia and Giuseppe Scaglioni of the 84^{a} Squadriglia) took off from El Adem to intercept a formation of Bristol Blenheims. The three CR.42’s pilots shot down a Blenheim (K7178) from 30 Squadron, that crashed, killing the crew, and heavily damaged another from 113 Squadron.

A few days later, on 4 August 1940, Lucchini was escorting some Breda Ba.65s, with other C.R.42s. Some miles north-west of Bir Taieb El Essem, he intercepted and – after a long dogfight – shot down a Gloster Gladiator, probably flown by the South-African ace-to-be Marmaduke Pattle (that in the following eight months would become one of the most successful Western Allied ace of the war). On 16 December, Lucchini and another 4° Stormo pilot attacked one of the Hawker fighters that had shot down three Savoia Marchetti S.M. 79s between Sidi Omar and Capuzzo, forcing it to force-land: it was Pilot Officer MacFadden’s Hurricane (V6737) from No. 73 Squadron RAF, that was later recovered and repaired.

On 27 June 1941, he claimed a Hawker Hurricane, and shared in many more victories. Still in the Bardia area, on 24 July, he shot down individually another Gloster Gladiator and damaged three Blenheim bombers.

In mid 1941 he operated over Malta, from Sicily, now flying C.200 monoplanes. But on 27 September, he was wounded and was out of action for some time.

On 30 November 1941, Capitano Lucchini took command of the 84^{a} Squadriglia of 4° Stormo. By the end of 1941, 10° Gruppo was re-equipped with the new, more effective, C.202. On 2 April 1942 Capitano Lucchini was leading the unit in its flight back to Castelvetrano, Sicily, from Rome-Ciampino airfield, with 26 new C.202.

In the combats over Malta, he added two more victories to his total. He claimed his first kill on 9 May 1942, a Supermarine Spitfire, while escorting five CANT Z.1007bis from the 210^{a} Squadriglia BT. The second – another Spitfire – was claimed on 15 May, while escorting three Savoia-Marchetti SM.84 bis bombers of 4° Gruppo BT. But – according to some sources – the RAF did not suffer any losses in those air combats. On 26 May 1942 4°Stormo moved back to Libya for a second tour of desert operations in North Africa.

Here, he was involved in many air combats throughout the second half of 1942, claiming at least 14 air victories and sharing many others. He claimed his first kill on 4 June, a Curtiss P-40 over Bir Hakeim. He shot down another P-40 on 17 June, over Sidi Rezegh. On 10 July, Capitano Lucchini led eleven C.202s from 84^{a} Squadriglia, 10° Gruppo, in a free hunt mission in the El Alamein area and attacked a formation of 15 P-40s. The Curtiss P-40s formed a defensive Lufbery circle. The combat ended after 30 minutes when the Macchis had no more ammunition. Lucchini claimed a P-40, and three more were claimed by other Italian pilots.

On 16 July 1942, Lucchini and other pilots from 84^{a}, 90^{a} and 91^{a} Squadriglia clashed with 25 P-40 and six Spitfire fighters over Deir el Qattara. He shared in the destruction of a Curtiss fighter, but his aircraft was hit by five bullets, one of them piercing a fuel tank in the left wing root, and he was able to land at El Quteifiya, although stunned by fuel vapour. But he was shot down on 24 October after claiming a Curtiss P-40 and a Douglas Boston. He was hospitalized and then evacuated home with his score at 25 kills. He rejoined the 10°Gruppo once more in June 1943, just in time to take part in Home Defence. His unit was then based in Sicily.

== Last mission ==
On 5 July 1943, Lucchini took off in his Macchi C.202 with 26 other pilots of 4° Stormo to intercept 52 USAAF Boeing B-17 Flying Fortresses, probably from 99th Bomber Group, that were heading to bomb the airfields around Catania, escorted by 20 Spitfires from 72 and 243 Squadrons. Lucchini was leading 10°Gruppo that consisted of the 84^{a} Squadriglia, the 90^{a} Squadriglia and 91^{a} Squadriglia. The Italian made a frontal attack on the bombers over Gerbini airfield, ignoring the escorting Spitfires. In the sky of Catania, Lucchini was last seen to damage – with other pilots – three bombers and then to shoot down a Spitfire. But he was later himself shot down by heavy defensive fire and dived into the ground east of Catania. At the time of his death, Lucchini was credited with 22 air victories, making him one of the highest-ranking Italian ace. These kills were claimed in 70 aerial combats, during 294 missions (alternatively 262 missions). He was also credited with 52 shared claims.

== Awards ==
- Medaglia commemorativa della campagna di Spagna
- Medaglia di benemerenza per i volontari della guerra Spagna
- Gold Medal of Military Valour (Medaglia d’Oro al Valor Militare, posthumously, 1952) - "Young commander of a fighter group, inspiring pilot and a capable, enthusiastic and confident leader. An Italian fighter ace of pure ideals, who as a war volunteer suffered the severe regime of captivity without allowing it to weaken his indomitable spirit. He faced pilots from all around the world in the skies of all war fronts, and in his duels, always fought gallantly, he brilliantly proved his superb qualities of pilot and combatant. His numerous victories did not cloud his judgement with vanity: convinced of his mission, he continued to carry out his task with unchanged concentration and will, a constant example to all in the performance of his duty. He returned to combat with wounds still open: always first where the combat was at its hardest and at its more violent, he would transmit to others the pure love for his country that animated him. In an epic battle fought over on the sacred soil of Italy against an overwhelming number of foes, he was defeated by adverse fortune and not by the skill of an opponent to whom he had always clearly been superior. He fell as gallantly as he had lived, and following the luminous trail left by Baracca, he continues with him to point to the pilots of his group the heroic path to be followed.- Skys of North Africa, the Mediterranean and Sicily, June 1940 - July 1943"
- Silver Medal of Military Valour (Medaglie d'argento al valore militare), 5 times (1939, 1940, 1941 and 2 others)
- Bronze Medal of Military Valour (Medaglia di bronzo al valore militare)
- War Merit Cross (Croce di guerra al valor militare), 3 times
- Iron Cross of 1939, 2nd class (1942)
- Mentioned in the Bollettino di Guerra (War Bulletin) on 5 September 1942 and 6 July 1943
