= Andrea Rabagliati =

British physician and author (1843–1930)

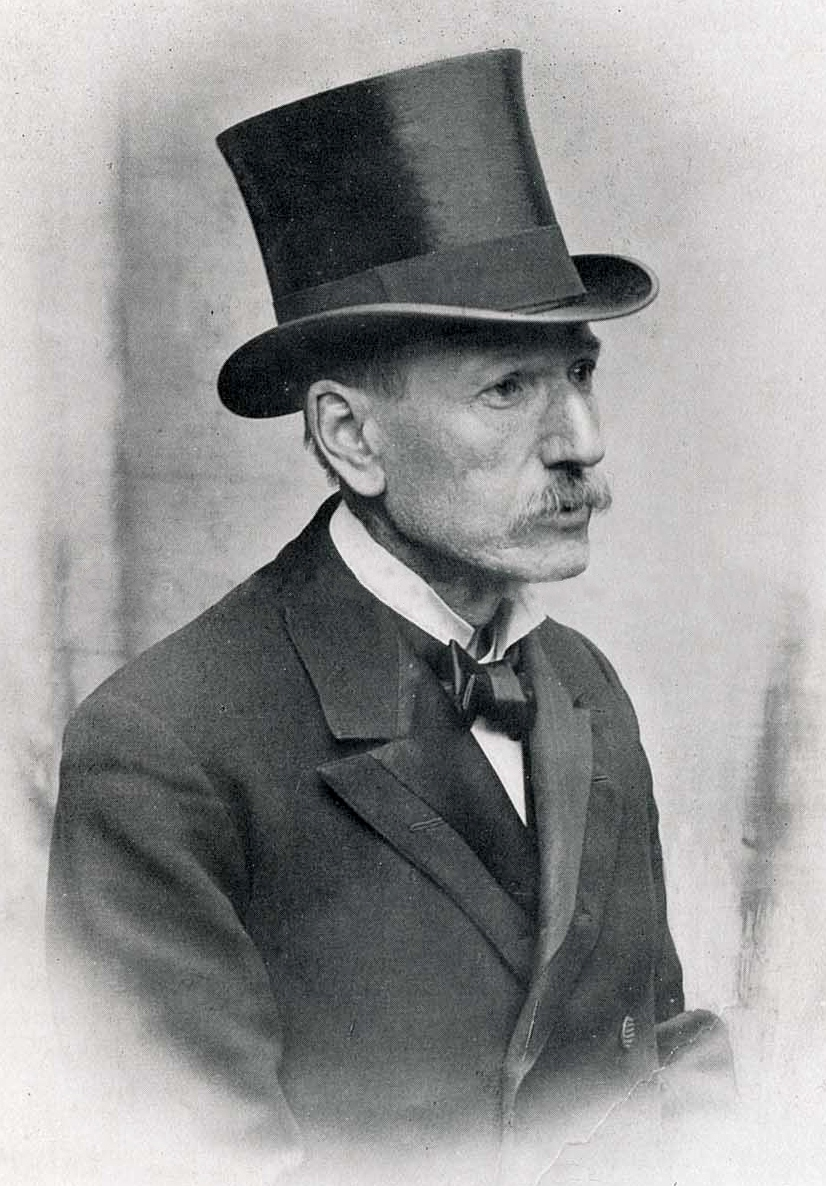
- Rabagliati c. 1890
- Born: Andrea Carlo Francisco Rabagliati; 22 May 1843; Edinburgh, Scotland
- Died: 7 December 1930 (aged 87); Ben Rhydding, England
- Education: Edinburgh University
- Known for: Doctor and author
- Spouse: Helen Priscilla McLaren
- Children: Euan Rabagliati; Herman Victor Rabagliati; Duncan Silvestro Rabagliati OBE; Catherine Rabagliati MBE (Mayor of Paddington)
- Relatives: Alexander Rabagliati (grandson)

Andrea Carlo Francisco Rabagliati (22 May 1843 – 7 December 1930) was a Scottish physician, naturopath and author of books on dietary practice.

== Career ==
Rabagliati was born in Edinburgh in 1843. He was the son of Giacomo Rabagliati, a political refugee from Italy, and Caroline Kinnison. Giacomo first appeared in an article in the Scotsman newspaper in December 1827, offering his services as a teacher of French, Italian, and Spanish. The Scotsman stated, "suffice it to say, that he (Giacomo) is expatriated from Italy for having carried arms in defence of the liberties of his country, and seeks an asylum and a field for the exercise of his talents in the city."

In 1860, Rabagliati spent two years in British Guiana with his uncle. He studied medicine at Edinburgh University and qualified M.B. in 1869 and M.D. in 1872. He won a gold medal for his thesis on relapsing fever. He was assistant medical officer to the Bradford Workhouse and was house surgeon to the Bradford Infirmary in 1870. He began private practice in 1872. He was appointed surgeon to the Bradford Infirmary in 1877 and a medical officer to the Bradford Fever Hospital. He was invested as a Fellow of the Royal College of Surgeons of Edinburgh in 1890. He was a consulting surgeon to Bingley Hospital and established St. Catherine's Home for Cancer.

Rabagliati resided in Ben Rhydding. He married Helen Priscilla McLaren, daughter of Duncan McLaren and Priscilla Bright McLaren (sister of John Bright), on 25 May 1877. She was the President of Ben Rhydding Women's Unionist Association for 28 years and of the Wharfedale Conservative Women's Club for several years after World War One. They had five children including Euan Rabagliati, Duncan Silvestro Rabagliati OBE, Catherine Rabagliati MBE (Mayor of Paddington) and Herman Victor Rabagliati.

He was a member of the Yorkshire branch of the British Medical Association from 1888 to 1892 and was president of the branch from 1893 to 1894. Rabagliati argued against the germ theory of disease.

== Beliefs ==
Rabagliati has been described as an advocate of alternative medicine and the "nature cure". He was one of the earliest fully qualified medical men to advocate for nature cure. Biographer Carole Seymour-Jones has noted that in his book Air, Food and Exercise, Rabagliati described how "cancer, influenza, pneumonia and almost all modern diseases could be cured by diet."

Rabagliati was a convinced vegetarian, who favoured two meals a day, with eight hours between them. One of his notable patients was Beatrice Webb. She was prescribed a milk and soup diet with two ounces of rice for a few weeks. She was influenced by this diet and in 1902 converted to vegetarianism. Rabagliati believed that people could add fifteen years to their lives by following his diet.

Rabagliati held some unorthodox ideas, for example he believed that bodily energy and heat do not come from any food source. Instead he speculated that humans obtain "vital energy" from sleeping. He authored a book about this in 1907 titled The Functions Of Food In The Body and wrote the introduction to Hereward Carrington's Vitality, Fasting and Nutrition, which expounded on these ideas. A review in the Edinburgh Medical Journal, suggested he was advocating a "modified form of vitalism". His 1907 book was mocked in the Scottish Medical and Surgical Journal, which commented "we are in doubt as to whether to take this book seriously or not. If the latter, it is one of the best scientific jokes perpetrated for many a day." A review in The British Medical Journal described Rabagliati's ideas on the origin of bodily energy as "interesting philosophical speculations" but noted they lacked scientific evidence.

Rabagliati has been cited as a forgotten pioneer in the field of manual therapy. He authored Initis Or Nutrition and Exercises in 1905. Initis was a term for "congestion of the body's tissues" that involved the use of a connective tissue technique in which the finger and thumb pressures on tender spots designed to remove congestion of lymph fluid. The technique entailed "lifting pressure" off nerves by using pressure movements to the muscles and their surrounding connective tissues to reduce congestion. Naturopath Stanley Lief was influenced by Rabagliati's method and combined it with ayurveda techniques to form Neuromuscular Therapy.

== Publications ==
- Aphorisms, Definitions, Reflections, and Paradoxes, Medical, Surgical and Dietetic (1901), Bailliere, Tindall and Cox, 291p
- Air, Food and Exercises: An Essay on the Predisposing Causes of Disease (1904, 3rd Edition)
- The Functions of Food in the Body: Does Either Bodily Energy or Bodily Heat Come From the Food? (1907), Elliot Stock, London, 46p
- Conversations With Women Regarding their Health and that of their Children (1912), C. W .Daniel Company, London, 318p
- Human Life and the Body: An Essay on the Force of Man-Life (1920), Stockwell, London
- Initis Or Nutrition and Exercises (1930, 2nd Edition), C. W. Daniel Company, London, 200p
- Towards Life: Happy, Healthy, Efficient (1923), C. W. Daniel Company, London, 224p, ISBN 0-85207-031-4
- A Catechism of Health (1928) C. W. Daniel Company, London.
- A New Theory of Energy (Paperback) (2005 reprint), Kessinger Publishing, 48p, ISBN 1-4253-2521-1
