= Helen Rabagliati =

Philanthropist and activist (1851–1934)

Helen Priscilla Rabagliati, MBE (née McLaren; 1851–1934) was a philanthropist and campaigner for improvements in health, women's condition and political change.

== Family ==
Helen Priscilla McLaren was born on 28 October 1851. She was the daughter of Duncan McLaren and Priscilla Bright (sister of John Bright). She was a sister of Charles McLaren, 1st Baron Aberconway and Walter McLaren and was the cousin of Helen Bright Clark.

She married physician and author Andrea Rabagliati on 25 May 1877. They had five children including Euan Rabagliati, Duncan Silvestro Rabagliati OBE, Catherine Rabagliati MBE (Mayor of Paddington) and Herman Victor Rabagliati. Her grandson was Alexander Rabagliati.

== Activism ==
Her most significant and enduring contributions to Bradford were education and public health. She founded the early hospice St Catherine's and supported a maternity home for young unsupported women, St. Monica's. After 1900 she was very prominent in West Riding Conservative women's politics. She increasingly took the opposite political viewpoint of that of her family.

During World War I, she was president of the Ilkley Ladies' Belgian Hospitality Committee. In recognition of the "kind help and valuable assistance personally given to the Belgian refugees and Belgian soldiers during the war" she was awarded the Medaille de la Reine Elisabeth by the King of the Belgians.

Rabagliati was invested as a Member, Order of the British Empire (MBE).

== Death ==
Rabagliati died on 3 January 1934, at age 82.

== See also ==
- Ladies National Association for the Repeal of the Contagious Diseases Acts
