= Euan Rabagliati =

British soldier & pilot (1892–1978)

- Born: Cuthbert Euan Charles Rabagliati; 1 January 1892; Manningham, Bradford, Yorkshire, England
- Died: 6 January 1978 (aged 86); Cannes, Alpes-Maritimes, Provence-Alpes-Côte d'Azur, France
- Relatives: Andrea Rabagliati (father); Helen Priscilla McLaren (mother); Agnes McLaren (aunt); Charles McLaren (uncle); John McLaren (uncle); Walter McLaren (uncle); Duncan McLaren (grandfather); Priscilla Bright McLaren (grandmother); Alexander Rabagliati (nephew)
- Military career
- Allegiance: United Kingdom
- Branch: British Army; Royal Air Force
- Service years: 1912–1948
- Rank: Lieutenant Colonel
- Nickname: "The Rabbi"
- Units: King's Own Yorkshire Light Infantry; No. 5 Squadron RFC
- Commands: No. 24 Squadron RFC
- Conflicts: First World War: Western Front; Second World War
- Awards: Military Cross; Air Force Cross; Mentioned in Despatches (2); Legion of Honour (France)
- Other work: Racing driver, insurance broker, MI6 officer

Cuthbert Euan Charles Rabagliati, MC, AFC, (1 January 1892 – 6 January 1978) was a British soldier, pilot, race car driver and intelligence officer. He served in the Royal Flying Corps (RFC) during the First World War and is credited as being the first RFC pilot to shoot down an enemy aircraft. As a racing driver at Brooklands in the 1930s, his crash was followed by the introduction of signs "Motor Racing is Dangerous" at all race meetings. During the Second World War he served as head of MI6's Dutch section.

== Early life and education ==
Rabagliati, who preferred to use his second name Euan, was born in Manningham, Bradford, Yorkshire, the fourth son of Andrea Rabagliati and Helen Priscilla McLaren. His father, the son of an Italian political refugee who had settled in Edinburgh, worked as a surgeon at Bradford Infirmary. Euan was educated at the Loretto School in Edinburgh, Charney Hall School, Grange-over-Sands (1905-6) and Bradford Grammar School. He then attended the Royal Military College at Sandhurst as a gentlemen cadet, and after passing out was commissioned as a second lieutenant in The King's Own (Yorkshire Light Infantry) on 14 February 1912. Rabagliati became interested in flying, and was awarded Royal Aero Club Aviators' Certificate No. 779 after soloing a Bristol biplane at the Bristol Flying School at Brooklands on 11 May 1914. He was then transferred to the Royal Flying Corps, being appointed a flying officer on 30 June, and was promoted to lieutenant on 12 August.

== First World War ==
Rabagliati was posted to No. 5 Squadron RFC, which moved to France on 14 August, ten days after Britain's declaration of war on Germany. While selected pilots flew the squadron's twelve aircraft across the channel, Rabagliati and the rest of the squadron's personnel travelled by ship. On 21 August Second Lieutenant C. W. Wilson, with Rabagliati as his observer, flew the squadron's first reconnaissance mission, locating German cavalry ten miles from Namur. On 25 August the squadron was based at La Cateau when a Taube reconnaissance aircraft was seen approaching from the south. The squadron's commanding officer Major John Higgins ordered Wilson to drive him off, and Rabagliati jumped into the observer's seat of their Avro 504 carrying a Lee–Enfield .303 rifle and ammunition. Rabagliati steered Wilson to a position ahead and below the Taube, then opened fire with his rifle. Rabagliati fired around 100 rounds before the Taube pilot slumped forward into his seat and the aircraft descended to the ground and landed. Wilson considered landing to capture the aircraft, but observed what he assumed was a German column of troops approaching. Only after landing did he learn that they were British. Wilson and Rabagliati were credited with the first German aircraft shot down by the RFC, and on 8 October Rabagliati received a mention in despatches from Field Marshal John French, Commander-in-Chief of the British Army in France.

Rabagliati received his second mention in despatches on 5 April 1915, for "gallant and distinguished service in the field", and was appointed a flight commander with the acting rank of captain on 19 April. He was promoted to captain in the KOYLI on 1 October 1915.

On 4 November 1915 he was awarded the Military Cross, his citation reading:

Lieutenant (temporary Captain) Cuthbert Euan Charles Rabagliati, The King's Own (Yorkshire Light Infantry) and Royal Flying Corps.

For conspicuous gallantry and skill on 28th September, 1915, when, accompanied by Second Lieutenant Vaucour, they carried out a reconnaissance over Valenciennes and Douai. They had to fly in thick cloud for nearly the whole distance, and several times their aeroplane got into a "spin". The pilot, however, succeeded each time in righting his machine, and they reached their objective and carried out the reconnaissance at 2,800 feet under very heavy fire.

The presentation took place at Buckingham Palace on 9 December.

On 1 May 1916 Rabagliati was appointed a squadron commander with the acting rank of major, and served as commander of No. 24 Squadron from 29 November 1916 until 22 March 1917. On 1 January 1917 he was brevetted as a major "for valuable services rendered in connection with the War". On 11 April 1917 he was appointed a wing commander with the acting rank of lieutenant-colonel.

Rabagliati received his third mention "for distinguished service in war areas" in January 1919. In June he was awarded the Air Force Cross, and in August the Légion d'honneur from France. He resigned his commission on 6 August 1919, but was permitted to retain his rank.

== Inter-war career ==
=== Insurance broker ===
After the war Rabagliati became a member of Lloyd's of London, and in August 1920, as a representative of the White Cross Aviation Insurance Association, was appointed to Lloyd's Aviation Sub-Committee. In August 1929 he was a member of the British Aviation Insurance Group, authorized to issue Certificates of Airworthiness. In January 1930 he was appointed to Lloyd's Aviation Advisory Committee, as an underwriting member of Lloyd's, and of Messrs. Willis, Faber and Dumas. On 1 July 1932, the Aviation Committees of Lloyd's Register of Shipping and the British Corporation Register of Shipping & Aircraft were merged into a joint committee of which Rabagliati was a member.

=== Racing driver ===
Rabagliati also had a parallel career as an amateur racing driver. He is said to have competed for the Éireann Cup in the 1st Irish Grand Prix, held at Phoenix Park on 13 July 1929. He drove a 2-litre Lagonda OH for Fox & Nicholl (although the programme and reports for the event appear not to confirm this). The next year, on 9 May 1930, Rabagliati took part in the Double Twelve Hour Race at Brooklands, driving a Talbot AO90. Towards the end of the first day's racing, while attempting to overtake the Austin 7 Ulster of Archibald Frazer-Nash, Rabagliati lost control and skidded, and his fellow Talbot driver Roland Hebeler crashed into him. Rabagliati's car span off the track into the spectator area, killing one and injuring twenty others, many seriously. Edward "Ted" Allery, Rabagliati's riding mechanic, was killed, and Rabagliati suffered severe head injuries, having a silver plate inserted into his skull. After waking from a coma, his first words was to ask for a bottle of champagne. The accident gave rise to the legal case: Hall v. Brooklands Auto Racing Club, after which the signs "Motor Racing is Dangerous" were displayed at all race meetings.

=== Reserve officer ===
Rabagliati was a member of the Reserve of Air Force Officers, being confirmed in his rank of flying officer on 29 March 1924. On 15 September 1925 he was transferred from Class "A" to Class "C" with the rank of squadron leader, finally relinquishing his commission on completion of his period of service in November 1926.

Rabagliati also remained a member of the Army Reserve of Officers until 4 June 1948, finally relinquishing his commission on exceeding the age limit of liability to recall, but retained the rank of lieutenant colonel.

== Second World War ==
During the Second World War Rabagliati served as an officer of the Secret Intelligence Service (MI6).

In June 1941 Rabagliati met with Thomas Sneum, a former Danish Naval Air Service lieutenant who had flown from Denmark to England in a Hornet Moth (which necessitated him climbing out onto the wings mid-flight to refuel). During the meeting, at Rabagliati's home in St. James's, close to the offices of MI6, he persuaded Sneum to return to Denmark as an agent.

Rabagliati, working with Dutch former police chief François van 't Sant, head of the Dutch Central Intelligence Department in London, infiltrated five agents into the Netherlands, to provide communications with Dutch resistance groups, but by December 1941 only one, Aart Alblas, was still at liberty. Alblas was finally arrested, and executed at Mauthausen in September 1944.

Rabagliati's first operation as head of Section P8, covering the Netherlands, was in March 1942 when he attempted to infiltrate two agents by boat. The men were transported across the North Sea by MGB 325 from the 15th Motor Gunboat Flotilla at Great Yarmouth. Unfortunately while being rowed ashore by Charles Elwell, the first lieutenant, their boat capsized and all three were captured. One of the agents, Maessen, a Dutch naval officer, was executed, and Elwell ended the war in Colditz.

Rabagliati was also responsible for "Operation Contact Holland". During this operation Dutch agents were put ashore in Scheveningen. One of them, Peter Tazelaar, went ashore wearing a tuxedo under his wet suit.

Tazelaar's insertion into Holland was the inspiration for the pre-title sequence of the James Bond film Goldfinger. The film's screenwriter, Paul Dehn, had served in SOE, and was aware of Tazelaar's insertion. The operation's leader, Erik Hazelhoff Roelfzema, wrote Soldier of Orange describing his war time experiences. In the film based on the book, Edward Fox played the character "Colonel Rafelli", which was based on Rabagliati.

== Post-war ==
After the war Rabagliati was the British vice-consul in San Francisco, and in 1954 he was appointed President of the British American Trade Centre, based in San Francisco, which aimed to promote and assist trade between the UK and the USA.

Rabagliati eventually retired to Cannes in the South of France. He died in 1978.

== Personal life ==
Rabagliati was married three times; firstly in 1916 to Monica Priestley, the daughter of Joseph Child Priestley, then on 4 December 1922 to Clarissa Catherine Melvill de Hochepied Larpent, daughter of John Melvill, 9th Baron de Hochepied, at St Ethelburga's Bishopsgate, London. His third marriage was on 7 March 1940 to Beatrix Purdey Oliver, the widow of Vincent Gandolfi-Hornyold, 3rd Duke Gandolfi.
