= Regia Aeronautica =

Air force of the Kingdom of Italy

- Aircraft insignia of the Regia Aeronautica
- Active: 1923–1946
- Country: Kingdom of Italy
- Type: Air force

Commanders
- Commander: Chief of Staff of the Air Force
- Notable commanders: During World War II: Francesco Pricolo; Rino Corso Fougier; Renato Sandalli; Pietro Piacentini

Insignia
- Roundels

- Flag

The Royal Italian Air Force (Italian: Regia Aeronautica Italiana, RAI) was the air force of the Kingdom of Italy. It was established as a service independent of the Royal Italian Army from 1923 until 1946. In 1946, the monarchy ended and the Kingdom of Italy became the Italian Republic, whereupon the name of the air force changed to Aeronautica Militare.

== History ==
=== Beginnings ===
At the beginning of the twentieth century, Italy was at the forefront of aerial warfare: during the colonization of Libya in 1911, it made the first reconnaissance flight in history on 23 October, and the first ever bombing raid on 1 November.

During World War I, the Italian Corpo Aeronautico Militare, then still part of the Regio Esercito (Royal Army), operated a mix of French fighters and locally built bombers, notably the gigantic Caproni aircraft. The Regia Marina (Royal Navy) had its own air arm, operating locally built flying boats.

=== Founding of the Regia Aeronautica ===
The Italian air force became an independent service—the Regia Aeronautica—on 28 March 1923. Benito Mussolini's fascist regime turned it into a propaganda machine, with its aircraft, featuring the Italian flag colors across the full span of the undersides of the wings, making numerous record-breaking flights. Between 1 April 1939 (I think 1 April 1939 is an error - it must have been an earlier year - as this paragraph talks of records in 1933 and 1934 below) and 1 November 1939, Italian airmen established no fewer than 110 records, winning world championships in round trips, long-range flights, high speed and altitude flights. After successful long-range flights around the Mediterranean Sea, Charles Lindbergh's successful transatlantic flight in the Spirit of St. Louis inspired the Regia Aeronautica to embark on a longer transatlantic voyage with stops in West Africa and Brazil. Possibly the most successes were the floatplane world speed record of 709 km/h (440.6 mph) achieved by Francesco Agello in the Macchi-Castoldi MC-72 in October 1934 and the long-range formation flight to the United States and back to Italy in 1933, a total of 19,000 km (11,800 miles) with Savoia-Marchetti S.55 flying boats. This Decennial Air Cruise included stops in Amsterdam, Derry, Reykjavík, Labrador, Montreal, Chicago, Brooklyn, and Washington D.C., with the highlight being a landing in Lake Michigan in front of Chicago Navy Pier and a procession through the city before crowds of thousands of Americans to coincide with the Century of Progress Exhibition. This pioneering achievement was organized and led by General of Aviation Italo Balbo.

During the latter half of the 1930s, the Regia Aeronautica participated in the Spanish Civil War, as well as the invasions of Ethiopia and Albania.

=== Ethiopian war ===
The first test for the new Italian Royal Air force came in October 1935, with the Second Italo-Ethiopian War. During the final stages of the war, the Regia Aeronautica deployed up to 386 aircraft, operating from Eritrea and Somalia. The Italian aviators did not have any opposition in the air, as the Imperial Ethiopian Air Force had just 15 transport and liaison aircraft, only nine of which were serviceable. However, the Regia Aeronautica lost 72 planes and 122 aircrew while supporting the operations of the Regio Esercito, sometimes dropping poison gas bombs against the Ethiopian army. After the end of hostilities on 5 May 1936, for the following 13 months the Regia Aeronautica had to assist Italian forces in fighting Ethiopian guerrillas.

=== Spanish Civil War (1936−1939) ===
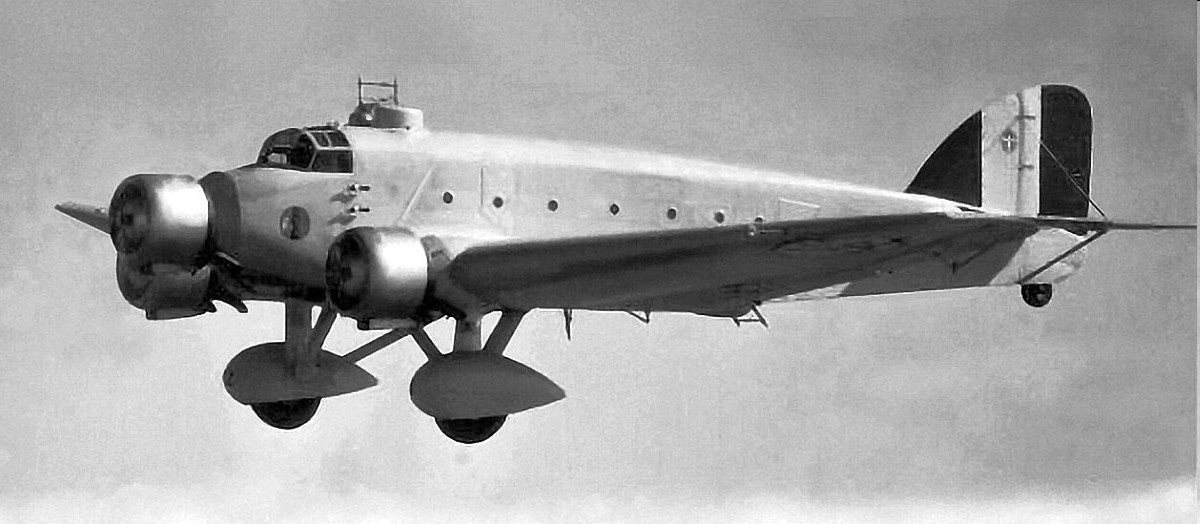
A Savoia-Marchetti SM.81 during a bombing raid in the Spanish Civil War (1936–39).

During the Spanish coup of July 1936, Italian pilots in Spanish Foreign Legion uniforms airlifted Francisco Franco's Army of Africa from Spanish Morocco to the Spanish mainland. During the Spanish Civil War Italian pilots fought alongside Spanish Nationalist and German Luftwaffe pilots as members of the Aviazione Legionaria ("Aviation Legion"). This deployment took place from July 1936 to March 1939 and complemented an expeditionary force of Italian ground troops called the "Corps of Volunteer Troops". In Spain, the Italian pilots were under direct command of the Spanish Nationalists and took part in training and joint operations with the pilots of the German "Condor Legion". Mussolini sent to Spain 6000 aviation personnel as well as about 720 aircraft, including 80-90 Savoia-Marchetti SM 81, 100 Savoia Marchetti SM.79 bombers and 380–400 Fiat CR.32 biplanes that dominated the air, proving superior to the Soviet Polikarpovs of the Spanish Republican Air Force. The Aviazione legionaria achieved approximately 500 aerial victories, losing 86 aircraft in air combat and about 200 flying personnel. But more important than the material losses were the wrong conclusions drawn from air war in Spain. The Air Ministry, blinded by the success of the Fiat CR.32, persisted in its belief that the biplane could still dominate the sky, and ordered large numbers of Fiat CR.42 Falcos, the last war biplane in history.

=== Albania ===
The Regia Aeronautica played a limited role during the Italian invasion of Albania in 1939.

=== World War II ===
In July 1939, the Regia Aeronautica was seen as a splendid air arm, holding no fewer than 33 world records, which was more than Germany (15), France (12), the United States (11), the Soviet Union (7), Japan (3), the United Kingdom (2), and Czechoslovakia (1). When World War II began in 1939, Italy had a paper strength of 3,296 machines. While numerically a force to be reckoned with, it was hampered by the local aircraft industry which was using obsolete production methods. Only 2,000 aircraft were fit for operations, of which just 166 were modern fighters (89 Fiat G.50 Freccias and 77 Macchi MC.200s), both slower than potential opponents as the Hawker Hurricane, the Supermarine Spitfire and the Dewoitine D.520. The Regia Aeronautica also had neither long-range fighters or night fighters. Technical assistance provided by its German ally did little to improve the situation.

==== Battle of France ====
On 10 June 1940, during the closing days of the Battle of France, Italy declared war on France and the United Kingdom. On 13 June, Fiat CR.42s attacked Armée de l'air (French Air Force) bases and escorted Fiat BR.20s that bombed the harbour of Toulon. Two days later, CR.42s from 3° Stormo and 53° Stormo attacked French air bases again and clashed with Dewoitine D.520s and Bloch MB.152s, claiming eight kills for five losses. When a small French Navy fleet shelled the Ligurian coast on 15 June, the Italian air force was not able to prevent this action or attack the French ships, showing a lack of cooperation with the Regia Marina (Italian Navy). The Regia Aeronautica carried out 716 bombing missions, with Italian aircraft dropping a total of 276 tons of bombs on French fortifications, military bases, and airfields (some of the targets being Toulon, Briançon, Traversette, and Cap San Martin); during this short war, Regia Aeronautica lost 10 aircraft in aerial combat and 24 aircrew, while claiming 10 kills and 40 French planes destroyed on the ground. According to a book published after the war by Generale Giuseppe Santoro, critical of the unplanned use of the Air Force, which had not been prepared for operations of aerial bombing against fortifications, only about 80 long tons (81 t) of the bombs were dropped on the targets. Despite this misuse of resources, the bombing missions made possible and supported the limited Italian advance into southern France by the Regio Esercito, with the Italian air force retaining its reputation until the Battle of Britain showed its limitations.

After the war, there was a widespread rumour in France, especially between Paris and Bordeaux, of Italian aircraft strafing civilian columns, with many people claiming to have seen the tricolour roundels painted on them. These allegations have been disproved, as the Italian aircraft did not have the range to hit such distant targets and concentrated on short-range military objectives (Regia Aeronautica wing roundels had three fasci littori, having replaced the tricolour ones). It was concluded that this was nothing more than a myth, arising from the reaction to the Italian attack, the fame of the Italian air force and the heated and confused climate.

==== Middle East ====
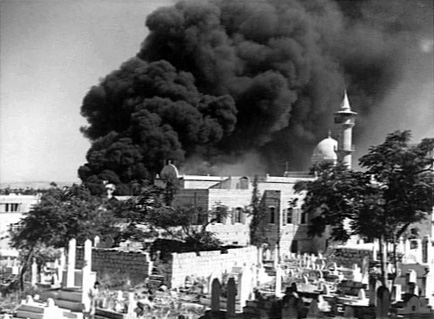
Destruction of Muslim graveyard and the Istiklal Mosque by Italian bombers during the bombing of Haifa, September 1940.

Regia Aeronautica aircraft were involved in the Middle Eastern theatre almost from the start of Italian involvement in World War II. During the Anglo-Iraqi War, German and Italian aircraft of "Flyer Command Iraq" (Fliegerführer Irak) stopped to refuel in the Vichy French-controlled Mandate of Syria as they flew to Iraq. These masqueraded as Iraqi Air Force aircraft and were painted as such en route. Continued concern over German and Italian influence in the area led to the Allies' Syria-Lebanon Campaign.

In one of the lesser known incidents of the war, starting in July 1940, Italian aircraft bombed cities in the British Mandate of Palestine. This was aimed at pushing the British back and retaking the greater Mediterranean, as in ancient Roman times. The bombing of Tel Aviv on 10 September killed 137 people. In mid-October, the Italians also bombed American-operated oil refineries in the British Protectorate of Bahrain.

==== East Africa ====
In Italian East Africa the Regia Aeronautica performed better than in other war theaters. In June 1940, the Italian Royal Air Force had here 195 fighters, bombers and reconnaissance aircraft, plus 25 transport planes. Some of these aircraft were outdated, but the Italians had Savoia-Marchetti SM.79 (12 examples) and Savoia-Marchetti SM.81 bombers and Fiat CR.42 fighters. In relative terms, these were some of the best aircraft on hand to either side at the beginning of the East African Campaign. In addition, the Italian aircraft were often based at better airfields than those of the British and Commonwealth forces. When the war began, Italian pilots were relatively well trained and confident of their abilities. At the beginning of the hostilities, Regia Aeronautica achieved aerial superiority and occasionally skilled Italian pilots, flying their Fiat biplanes, managed to shoot down even the faster and better armed Hawker Hurricane monoplanes. However, during the first three months, Regia Aeronautica lost 84 aircraft and had 143 aircrew personnel killed and 71 wounded, but the losses did not halt Italian operations. Cut off from Italy as they were though, problems with lack of fuel, munitions, spare parts and replacements became a serious problem and the Regia Aeronautica was worn down in a war of attrition. By 31 January, Prince Amedeo, Duke of Aosta, reported that the Italian military forces in East Africa were down to 67 operational aircraft with limited fuel. By the end of February, the Regia Aeronautica had only 42 aircraft left in East Africa, and the British now had the upper hand. In March, surplus personnel of air force units had to fight as infantry. By the end of the following month, Italians had only 13 serviceable aircraft left in East Africa. At last, on 24 October 1941, about one month prior to the final Italian surrender, the last Italian aircraft of the campaign, a Fiat CR.42, was shot down.

==== Battle of Britain ====
On 10 September 1940, the Corpo Aereo Italiano (CAI, Generale Rino Corso Fougier) an independent air corps for supporting the Luftwaffe in the Battle of Britain was established. The CAI comprised approximately 170 aircraft, including 80 Fiat Br.20 bombers and 98 Fiat G.50 Freccia and CR.42 fighters. The transfer of the aircraft was completed by 19 October. The CAI was based in Nazi-occupied Belgium. Bad weather and aeroplanes inadequate to that war theater hindered effective action by the CAI. The CR.42s clashed with British Hawker Hurricanes and Supermarine Spitfires just two times, in November. The Italians claimed five victories and nine probables but five Fiat biplanes were shot down. The RAF reported no losses. The 17 bombing raids carried out by the BR.20s did not cause much damage and aircraft were needed on the Greek front and in Cyrenaica In January 1941 the bombers and CR.42s started to be withdrawn to Italy. Just two squadrons of G.50s remained until mid-April 1941. During this campaign, the Regia Aeronautica lost 36 aircraft (including 26 in accidents) and 43 aircrew, without achieving a confirmed air victory.

==== Western Desert ====
An early Macchi C.202 (note lack of radio mast) of 81ª Squadriglia, 6° Gruppo, 1° Stormo CT; this photo appears to have been taken in Libya.

Initially, the Western Desert Campaign was a near equal struggle between the Regia Aeronautica and the Royal Air Force (RAF). Early on, the fighters available to both sides were primarily older biplanes, with Italian Fiat CR.32 and Fiat CR.42s flying against British Gloster Gladiators. After the Italian disasters during Operation Compass and the arrival of General Erwin Rommel and his Deutsches Afrika Korps (DAK) the Regia Aeronautica fought side by side with the Luftwaffe in the Western Desert.

Although the air campaign in Libya was seriously limited because of desert conditions, the Regia Aeronautica managed to retain a force of nearly four hundred aeroplanes. During the first British counter-offensive, the Regia Aeronautica suffered many losses (over 400 aircraft) until the Battle of Greece began, when much of the British land and air forces were diverted there giving the Italian forces time to recover. New Italian aircraft and units were supplemented by the arrival of the DAK and the attached Luftwaffe contingent deployed almost 200 aircraft in Libya and another 600 in Sicily. Working with the Luftwaffe, the Regia Aeronautica performed better due to the exchange of tactical doctrine and the arrival of more modern aircraft. In mid-1942, during the Battle of Bir Hakeim (26 May 1942 – 11 June 1942) the new Macchi C.202 Folgore fighter outperformed all of the Desert Air Force's fighters, achieving an unprecedented ratio kill/loss of 4.4/1, better than that of the famed Messerschmitt Bf 109s (3.5/1) fighting the same battle.

During Rommel's first offensive, the Italians managed to divert RAF attacks from his forces and covered his retreat during the British Operation Crusader, while inflicting heavy losses on RAF bombers. During Rommel's second offensive, the Regia Aeronautica and the Luftwaffe suffered considerable losses due to stronger Allied resistance during air battles over El Alamein and bombing raids over Alexandria and Cairo. The Regia Aeronautica, having suffered many losses in Egypt, was withdrawn progressively to Tobruk, Benghazi, Tripoli and, eventually, Tunisia.

==== Malta ====
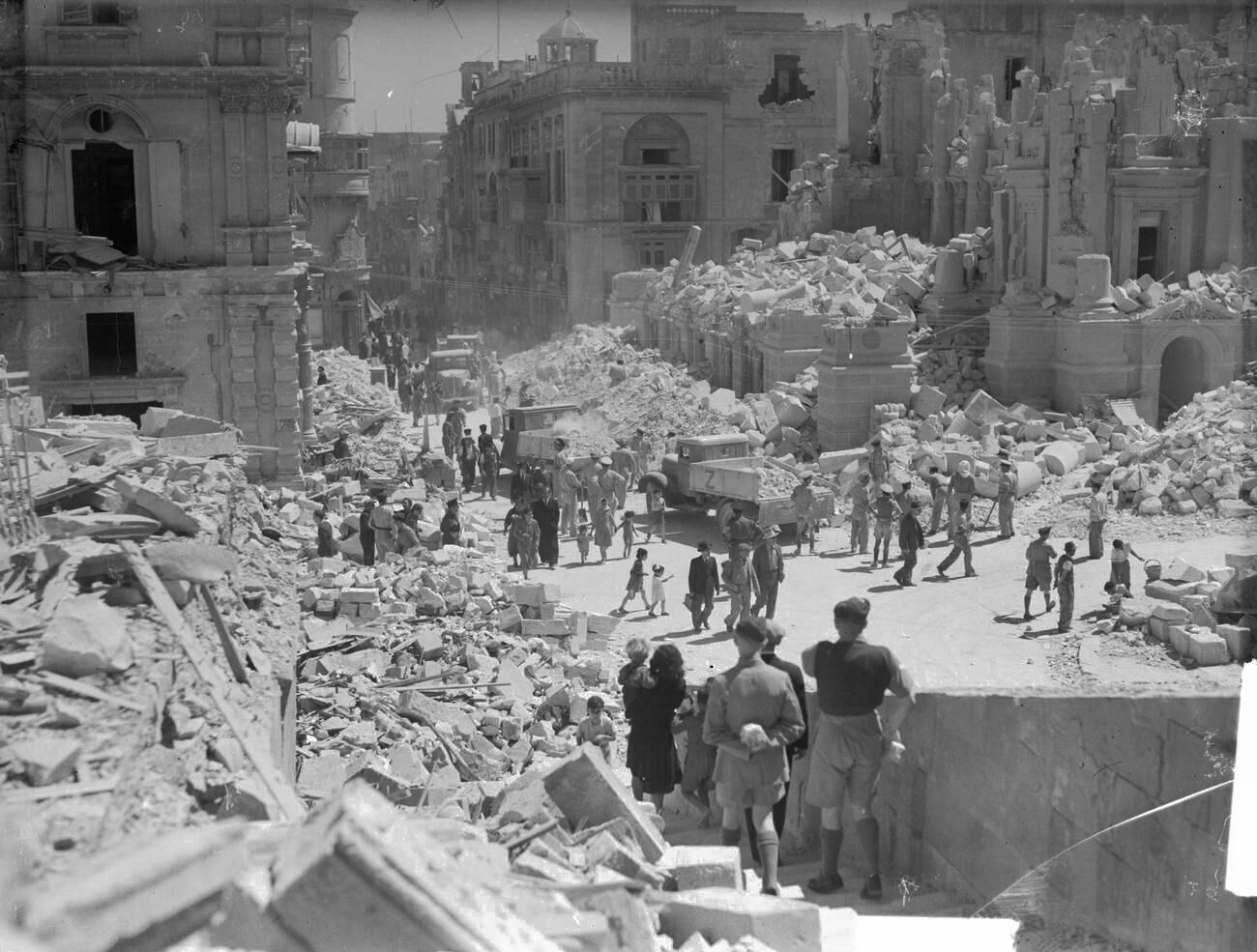
Bombing of Malta.

The Regia Aeronautica participated in the air offensive on the British controlled island of Malta along with the German Air Force in an attempt to protect the Axis sea routes from Sicily, Sardinia, and Italy to North Africa. Up to the end of 1940, the Regia Aeronautica carried out 7410 sorties against the island, dropping 550 tons of bombs, but losing 35 aircraft. The Italians claimed 66 British planes in these first six months of combat, but these claims were exaggerated. In 1941, Regia Aeronautica carried out further attacks on Malta, but less intensely than in 1940. The Italian airmen started to fear Maltese fighters and AA artillery, so much that the flight to the besieged island became known as the rotta della morte, the "route of death". In 1942, for its operations against Malta, between 1 January and 8 November, the Regia Aeronautica had 100 more aircraft lost in action.

Malta suffered heavy loss of equipment, ship, and vehicles, and was to the edge of starvation. However the besieged island managed to withstand the attacks from the Italian and German air forces and claimed almost 1,500 Axis planes, three times the real losses: up to November 1942, the Luftwaffe admitted to losing 357 aircraft and the Regia Aeronautica 210. But during the siege, the RAF's losses were even heavier, amounting to 547 in the air (including some 300 fighters) and 160 on the ground, plus 504 aircraft damaged in the air and 231 on the ground.

==== Gibraltar ====
The Regia Aeronautica began its attacks on the British crown colony of Gibraltar and its important naval base from July 1940. In 1942, Italian Piaggio P.108 bombers attacked Gibraltar from Sardinia, flying a number of long-range night raids. Up to October 1942, the Regia Aeronautica carried out 14 raids with a total of 32 bombers.

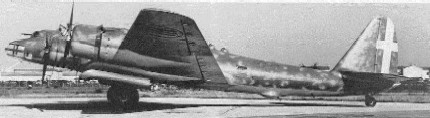
The Italian long-range bomber Piaggio P.108, ready to attack Gibraltar in 1942

The last raids on Gibraltar were flown during the 1943 Allied landing in Algeria, when those bombers also made a successful strike on the port of Oran. The only unit of the Regia Aeronautica to fly the Piaggio P.108 was the 274th Long-Range Bombardment Group, which was formed in May 1941 as the first machines came off the assembly lines. Training and achieving full operation strength took far longer than anticipated, and the 274th only became operational in June 1942.

==== Greece and Yugoslavia ====
When the Greco-Italian War started on 28 October 1940, the Regia Aeronautica fielded 193 combat aircraft, which initially failed to achieve air superiority against the Royal Hellenic Air Force (RHAF), which had 128 operational aircraft out of a total of 158. The poor infrastructure for Albania air bases hindered communications and movements between the Italian flying units. Only two airfields – Tirana and Valona – had macadam runways, so autumn and winter weather made operations more difficult. There was also the usual lack of co-operation between the Italian Navy and Army. Finally, just few days after the start of the war, Italian pilots were confronted by No. 80 Squadron, led by the outstanding ace Marmaduke Pattle and equipped with Gloster Gladiators, No. 30 Squadron, No. 211 Squadron and No. 84 Squadron with Bristol Blenheims, and No. 70 Squadron with Vickers Wellingtons. Gradually, Italian air power (including Squadriglie flying from Italian air bases) grew to over 400 aircraft against the dwindling numbers of the Greeks. However, this advantage did not stop the Hellenic Army from forcing the Regio Esercito onto the defensive and back into Albania. In early 1941, the tide was turned as the German Wehrmacht launched its simultaneous invasions of Yugoslavia and Greece.

For the 11-day campaign against Yugoslavia, the Regia Aeronautica deployed 600 aircraft, claimed five air victories (plus 100 planes destroyed on the ground) and suffered five losses. However, from that point on, the role of the Regia Aeronautica in the Balkans Campaign was primarily that of supporting the Luftwaffe. This support role continued during the occupation of Greece and Yugoslavia that followed.

The Regia Aeronautica claimed 218 aircraft shot down plus 55 probables against the RHAF and RAF, while the Greeks claimed 68 air victories (plus 23 probables) and the British 150 kills. Actually the air war against Greece cost the Italians just 65 losses (but 495 damaged) while RAF losses in the Greek campaign were 209 aircraft, 72 in the air, 55 on the ground, and 82 destroyed or abandoned during the evacuation.

==== Eastern Front ====
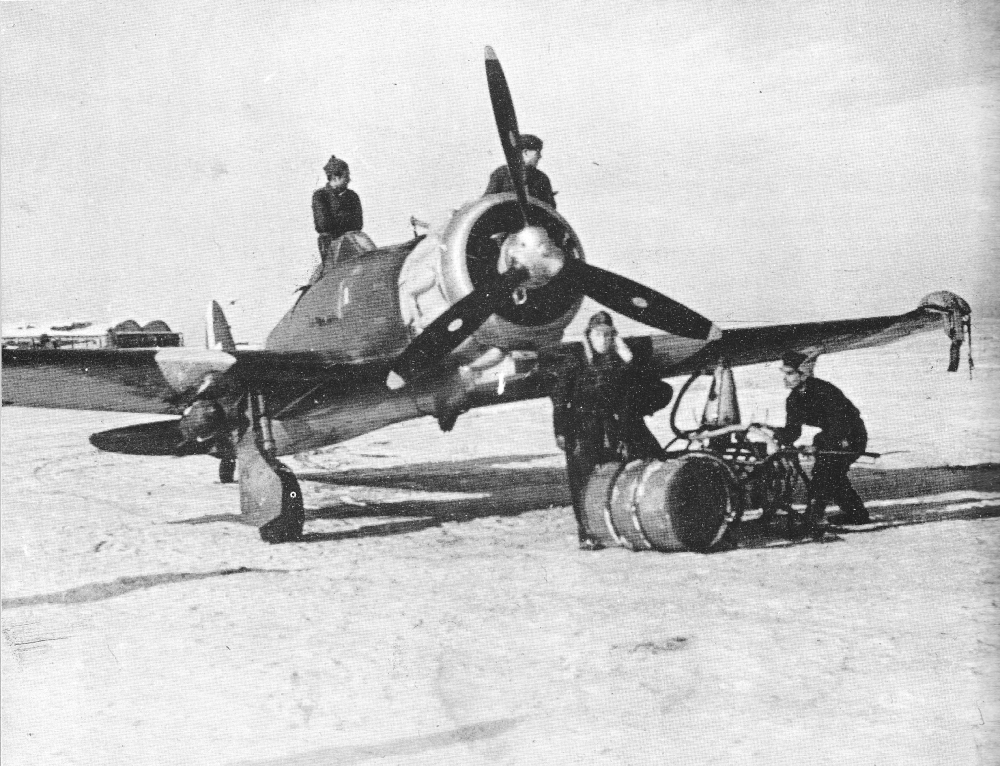
A Macchi C.200 on the eastern front in 1942

In August 1941 the Regia Aeronautica sent an Air Corps of 1,900 personnel to the Eastern Front as an attachment to the "Italian Expeditionary Corps in Russia" (Corpo di Spedizione Italiano in Russia, or CSIR) and then the "Italian Army in Russia" (Armata Italiana in Russia, or ARMIR) were known as the "Italian Air Force Expeditionary Corps in Russia" (Corpo Aereo Spedizione in Russia). These squadrons, initially consisting of 22° Gruppo CT with 51 Macchi C.200 fighters and 61° Gruppo with the Caproni Ca.311 bomber, supported the Italian armed forces from 1941 to 1943. They were initially based in the Ukraine and ultimately supported operations in the Stalingrad area. In mid 1942 the more modern Macchi C. 202 was introduced to operations in Russia. The CSIR was subsumed by the ARMIR in 1942 and the ARMIR was disbanded in early 1943 after disaster during the Battle of Stalingrad. The Air Corps pulled out of operations in January 1943, transferring to Odessa.

From 1944 to 1945, Italian personnel operated from the Baltic area and in the northern part of the Eastern Front under the direct command of the Luftwaffe under the name Air Transport Group 1 (Italian: 1° Gruppo Aerotrasporti "Terracciano" , German: 1° Staffel Transportfliegergruppe 10 (Ital)). This group was part of the National Republican Air Force of the Italian Social Republic.

==== Tunisian Campaign ====
Structure of the Regia Aeronautica in 1943

By the time of the Tunisian Campaign, the Regia Aeronautica and the Luftwaffe rarely enjoyed parity, let alone air superiority in North Africa.

==== Sicilian Campaign and before 8 September 1943 ====
The Regia Aeronautica was forced on the defensive during the Sicilian Campaign. Italian pilots were constantly fighting against Allied efforts to sink Regia Marina ships. Just before the Allied invasion, a huge Allied bomber offensive struck the airfields in Sicily in an effort to gain further air superiority. This left the Regia Aeronautica very weak, but aircraft continued to arrive from Sardinia, southern Italy, and southern France. The last mission of the Regia Aeronautica before the truce with the Allies was the defence during the United States Army Air Forces' bombings of Frascati and Rome on 8 September 1943.

==== Post-armistice ====
After the Italian armistice, the Regia Aeronautica was briefly succeeded by two new Italian air forces. Headquartered at Salerno in southern Italy, the Royalist Italian Co-belligerent Air Force (Aviazione Cobelligerante Italiana, or ACI) fought alongside the Allied forces. In northern Italy, the National Republican Air Force (Aeronautica Nazionale Repubblicana, or ANR) flew for the Italian Social Republic and the Axis. The first ANR fighter unit was the 101st Gruppo Autonomo Caccia Terrestre, based in Florence. Aircraft of the Royal and Republican air forces never fought each other. The ACI operated in the Balkans and the ANR in northern Italy and the area around the Baltic Sea.

From 10 June 1940 up to 8 September 1943, the Regia Aeronautica lost 6483 aircraft (other sources report 5201), including 3483 fighters, 2273 bombers, torpedo-bombers and transports, plus 227 reconnaissance planes. The Royal Italian Air Force itself claimed 4293 enemy aircraft, including 1771 destroyed on the ground. Personnel losses suffered during the conflict consisted of 3007 dead or missing, 2731 wounded and 9873 prisoners of war.

==== Regia Aeronautica Aces (World War II) ====
The Regia Aeronautica tended not to keep statistics on the individual level, instead reporting kills for a certain unit, attributed to their unit commander. However, pilots were able to keep personal log books, so the few that survived through World War II give individual statistics. Here is a list of the aces attributed with ten or more kills:

- Teresio Vittorio Martinoli – 22 kills
- Franco Lucchini – 22 kills (1 in Spain)
- Leonardo Ferrulli – 21 kills (1 in Spain)
- Franco Bordoni-Bisleri – 19 kills
- Luigi Gorrini – 19 kills
- Mario Visintini – 17 kills
- Ugo Drago – 17 kills
- Mario Bellagambi – 14 kills
- Luigi Baron – 14 kills
- Luigi Gianella – 12 kills
- Attilio Sanson – 12 kills
- Willy Malagola – 11 Kills
- Carlo Magnaghi – 11 kills
- Angelo Mastroagostino – 11 kills
- Giorgio Solaroli di Briona – 11 kills
- Mario Veronesi – 11 kills
- Fernando Malvezzi – 10 kills
- Giulio Reiner – 10 kills
- Giuseppe Robetto – 10 kills
- Carlo Maurizio Ruspoli di Poggio Suasa – 10 kills
- Massimo Salvatore – 10 kills
- Claudio Solaro – 10 kills
- Ennio Tarantola – 10 kills
- Giulio Torresi – 10 kills
- Adriano Visconti – 10 kills

== Notable members of the Règia Aeronautica ==
- Italo Balbo
- Francesco Baracca (precursor)
- Ettore Muti
- Pier Ruggero Piccio, founding Chief of Staff
- Umberto Nobile
- Vittorio Revetra
- Gaetano Costa

== The end of the Regia Aeronautica ==
The Regia Aeronautica was succeeded by Aeronautica Militare when Italy became a republic on 2 June 1946.

== See also ==
- Aeronautica Nazionale Repubblicana
- Italian Co-Belligerent Air Force
- List of aircraft of World War II
- Royal Italian Army
- Regia Marina

== Bibliography ==
- Apostolo, Giorgio (2000). Italian Aces of World War II. Botley, Kent: Osprey. ISBN 1-84176-078-1.
- Carr, John (2012). On Spartan Wings. Barnsley, SY: Pens & Sword Military. ISBN 978-1-84884-798-9.
- De Marchi, Italo (1976). Fiat BR.20 Cicogna. Le macchine e la storia. Modena: Editore S.T.E.M. Mucchi. OCLC 731413518.
- Garello, Giancarlo (October 1996). "La militarisation de l'aviation civile italienne durant la seconde Guerre Mondiale (1ère partie)" [The Militarization of Italian Civil Aviation During the Second World War]. Avions: Toute l'aéronautique et son histoire (in French) (43): 2–4. ISSN 1243-8650.
- Garello, Giancarlo (November 1996). "La militarisation de l'aviation civile italienne durant la seconde Guerre Mondiale (fin)". Avions: Toute l'aéronautique et son histoire (in French) (44): 3–7. ISSN 1243-8650.
- Green, William; Swanborough, Gordon, eds. (June 1982). "Fiat BR.20... Stork à la mode". Air International. 22 (6): 290–294, 307–312. ISSN 0306-5634.
- Greene, J.; Massignani, A. (2002) [1998]. The Naval War in the Mediterranean 1940–1943 (pbk. ed.). Rochester: Chatham. ISBN 978-1-86176-190-3.
- Harvey, Arnold D. (1993). Collision of Empires: Britain in Three World Wars 1793–1945. London: Hambledon Press. ISBN 1-85285-078-7.
- Massimello, Giovanni and Giorgio Apostolo. Italian Aces of World War 2. Osprey Publishing Ltd, 2000. ISBN 978-1-84176-078-0.
- Neulen, Hans Werner. In the Skies of Europe. Ramsbury, Marlborough, UK: The Crowood Press, 2000. ISBN 1-86126-799-1.
- Palermo, Michele (2014). Eagles over Gazala: Air Battles in North Africa, May–June 1942. Roma: IBN Editore. ISBN 978-88-7565-168-8.
- Rogers, Anthony, Battle over Malta - Aircraft Losses & Crash Sites 1940-42. Phoenix Mill Thrupp - Strout, Gloucestershire, Sutton Publishing, 2000. ISBN 0-7509-2392-X.
- Shores, Christopher (1976). Regia Aeronautica: A Pictorial History of the Italian Air Force, 1940–1943. Warren, Michigan: Squadron/Signal. OCLC 3089044.
