= Bombing of Cabra =

- Part of the Spanish Civil War
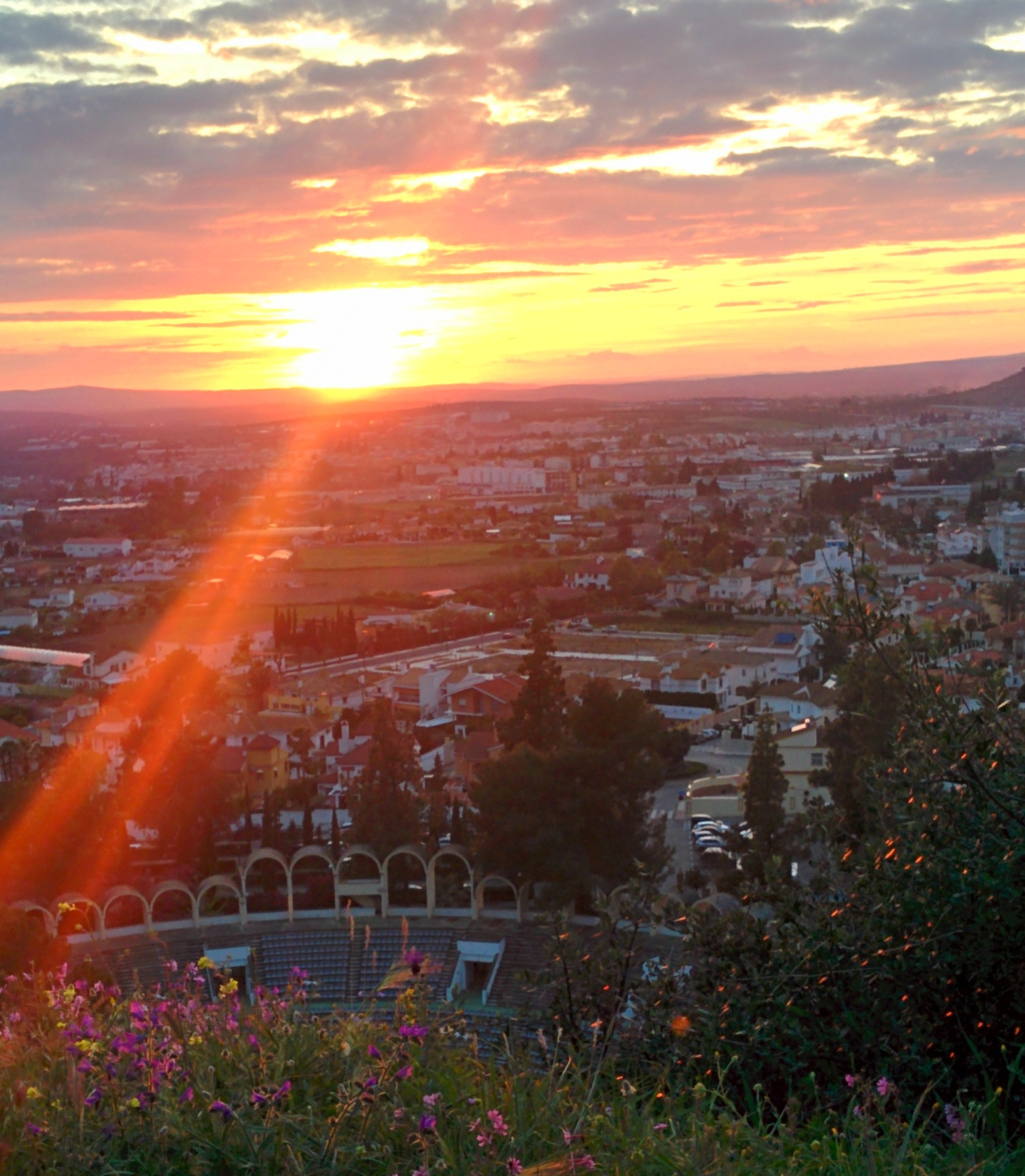
- Aerial view of the city of Cabra
Date	November 7, 1938
Location	Cabra, Cordoba, Spain
Result	107 civilians killed

Belligerents
Spanish Republic	Nationalist Spain

Strength
3 SB-2 bombers	

Casualties and losses
None	109 civilians killed 200+ civilians injured

The bombing of Cabra (7 November, 1938) was an aerial bombing raid on the town of Cabra, Andalusia during the Spanish Civil War, which was several kilometers away from the front at that time. The air raid carried out by the Republican faction killed 109 civilians and wounded more than 200.

== Background ==
Throughout 1938, the Spanish Republican Air Force (Fuerza Aerea de la República Española, FARE) carried out air bombings against Nationalist-held cities (among them Seville and Valladolid) in retaliation for the bombing of Republican held cities such as Barcelona, Alicante and Granollers.

== The attacks ==
On 7 November 1938, three Tupolev SB bombers of the FARE, bombed the town of Cabra, in the province of Córdoba. One of the 200 kilograms (440 lb) bombs fell on the town's market, killing dozens of civilians. The aircraft dropped six tons of bombs. Since it was a market day, most of the bombs exploded in the market and in the working class districts. There were between 101 and 109 civilians dead and 200 wounded. The Nationalist anti-aircraft artillery was taken by surprise and reacted too late. The airstrike was carried out in the mistaken belief that Italian mechanized troops were stationed in the village. Once over the target, the pilots mistook the market's awnings for military tents.

== Aftermath ==
The bombing of Cabra was the deadliest bombing carried out by the Republican air force during the war.

== See also ==
- Bombing of Guernica
- List of aircraft of the Spanish Republican Air Force
