= Vincenzo Velardi =

Italian Air Force general

- Born: 10 September 1894; Macerata, Kingdom of Italy
- Died: 5 June 1965 (aged 70); Rome, Italy
- Military career
- Allegiance: Kingdom of Italy
- Branch: Royal Italian Army; Regia Aeronautica
- Rank: Air Division General
- Commands: 118th Squadron; 21st Wing; 3rd Territorial Air Zone; 1st Ground Fighter Wing; 6th Ground Fighter Wing; 53rd Ground Fighter Wing; Aviazione Legionaria; Air Force of the Balearics; 1st Ground Fighter Division "Aquila"; Special Air Services Command
- Conflicts: World War I; Battles of the Isonzo; Spanish Civil War; Battle of Malaga; Battle of Guadalajara; Bombing of Barcelona; World War II; Battle of the Mediterranean
- Awards: Bronze Medal of Military Valor; Military Order of Savoy; Order of the Crown of Italy

Vincenzo Velardi (10 September 1894 – 5 June 1965) was an Italian Air Force general during the Spanish Civil War, in which he commanded the Aviazione Legionaria, and World War II.

== Biography ==
He was born in Macerata on 10 September 1894. After enlisting in the Royal Italian Army as an artillery officer, he was transferred to the aviators battalion, as an airplane observer, shortly after the Kingdom of Italy entered World War I, on 24 May 1915. He distinguished himself on Mount Vodice in July 1915, being promoted to the rank of lieutenant on 9 September of the same year. On 2 July 1915 he was assigned to the 1st Artillery Support Air Squadron, which on 15 April 1916 became the 41st Squadron. He took part in the conquest of Gorizia in July 1916, being decorated with a bronze medal for military valor. On 10 October 1917, with the rank of Captain, Velardi commanded the 118th Squadron, and at the end of the war he was a pilot of a Hanriot HD.1 Section attached to the 48th Squadron.

After the war he joined the newly established Regia Aeronautica; in 1931 he was Lieutenant Colonel and from 3 October to 11 June 1932 he commanded the 21st Wing, after which he held various posts, including that of commander of the 3rd Territorial Air Zone, of the Gorizia air base in 1933, and, between April 1935 and January 15, 1936, of the 1st Ground Fighter Wing. Between 15 January and 15 May 1936 he commanded the 6th Ground Fighter Wing, based at the Gorizia airport and later transferred to the Ghedi airport. On 15 May 1936 he assumed command of the newly established 53rd Ground Fighter Wing, based at the Mirafiori airfield in Turin and equipped with Fiat CR.32 biplanes.

On 28 December 1936, after promotion to Air Brigade General (air commodore), he replaced Lieutenant Colonel Ruggero Bonomi at the command of the Aviazione Legionaria, supporting the Francoist forces in the Spanish Civil War. He led his units during the battle of Malaga in February 1937 and the battle of Guadalajara in March, but shortly afterwards he came into conflict with the commander of the Corpo Truppe Volontarie, General Mario Roatta, due to the constant interference of the latter on the use of aviation during war operations; on 6 May 1937 he wrote a letter on the matter to the Chief of Staff of the Regia Aeronautica, General Giuseppe Valle, but his message was also transmitted to Roatta, who reacted violently and on 30 April ordered him to give him a complete copy of the message he had sent to Rome. In May 1937 he was then dismissed and replaced by General Mario Bernasconi at the head of the Aviazione Legionaria, assuming command of the Italian air units stationed in the Balearic Islands. Between 17 and 18 March 1938 Velardi led his bombing squadrons in a series of air raids on Barcelona, aimed at terrorizing the civilian population and weakening support for the Spanish Republic, causing heavy damage and civilian casualties to the Catalan capital.

After returning to Italy, on 6 July 1939 he assumed command of the 1st Ground Fighter Division "Aquila", based in Palermo and belonging to the 2nd Air Fleet of General Gennaro Tedeschini Lalli. At the head of the unit, after the Kingdom of Italy entered World War II on 10 June 1940, he took part in the initial stages of the war with France and Great Britain. In December 1941 he assumed the direction of the Special Air Services Command, which he held until April 1943, when he was replaced by General Attilio Matricardi. On 1 March 1942 he participated in a meeting that took place at the General Staff of the Regia Aeronautica, which was also attended by Generals Giuseppe Santoro, Umberto Cappa and Simon Pietro Mattei, and by Colonel Mario Porru-Locci, in which Lieutenant Colonel Amedeo Paradisi was chosen as pilot of the Savoia-Marchetti SM.75 that would fly from Italy to Japan and back.

After the end of the Second World War he retired to private life; he was one of the founding members of the Rotary Club of Macerata, and died in Rome on June 5, 1965.
