= Bombing raids on Cyprus during World War II =

British Cyprus was bombed by the Axis powers on several occasions during World War II. The island was weakly defended against aerial attack. It had no anti-aircraft artillery and very few aircraft. The main threat came from the Italian Dodecanese. In April 1935, late during the Second Italo-Ethiopian War, the Dodecanese were inspected by General Pietro Pinna Parpaglia, who proposed creating airfields capable of supporting offensive operations in the eastern Mediterranean. On 1 March 1937, the Comando Aeronautica dell'Egeo (Aegean Air Force Command) was formed on the islands.

The first Axis bombing of Cyprus took place on 22 September 1940 by the Royal Italian Air Force. The target was the port of Xeros. The town was machine-gunned and several ships of the Cyprus Mines Corporation were damaged. Although an airborne assault was feared in the summer of 1941, following the Battle of Crete, none materialized. As early as 2 May, authorities began relocating people from the towns to the countryside in preparation for major bombing. The Italians struck RAF Nicosia in May 1941. Later that month, in support of the French defence of Syria, the Italians and the German Luftwaffe attacked Cyprus from bases in the Dodecanese. Two civilians were killed. On 15 June, RAF Nicosia was bombed again. That month, Vichy France launched two retaliatory attacks on RAF Nicosia with Martin Maryland bombers, causing casualties. Among the injured were some members of the 7th Australian Division Cavalry Regiment.

On the morning of 7 July 1941, the Italians twice struck RAF Nicosia, injuring five civilians (one fatally) and three servicemen (two fatally), while damaging four RAF aircraft (one destroyed). In the afternoon, there was an attack on Famagusta, but the bombs landed in the water. On 9–10 July, the Italians hit RAF Nicosia again, causing some severe damage. On 12 July, Famagusta was attacked, causing minor damage to private property and the railway. Nine persons were killed in another raid on Famagusta in mid-August. Limassol was also hit. By September 1941, Cyprus was heavily reinforced and the main threat had passed.

== Bibliography ==
- Arielli, Nir (2010). "'Haifa is still Burning': Italian, German and French Air Raids on Palestine during the Second World War" (PDF). Middle Eastern Studies. 46 (3): 331–347.
- Dimitrakis, Panagiotis (2009). "The Special Operations Executive and Cyprus in the Second World War". Middle Eastern Studies. 45 (2): 315–328. doi:10.1080/00263200802697498.
- Panteli, Stavros (1984). A New History of Cyprus: From the Earliest Times to the Present Day. East-West Publications.
- Simmons, Mark (2015). The British and Cyprus: An Outpost of Empire to Sovereign Bases, 1878–1974. The History Press.
- Smith, Colin (2009). England's Last War Against France: Fighting Vichy, 1940–1942. Weidenfeld & Nicolson.
- Yiangou, Anastasia (2010). Cyprus in World War II: Politics and Conflict in the Eastern Mediterranean. I. B. Tauris.
