= Coma-ruga =

Coastal resort town in Catalonia, Spain

- Coastal Resort Town
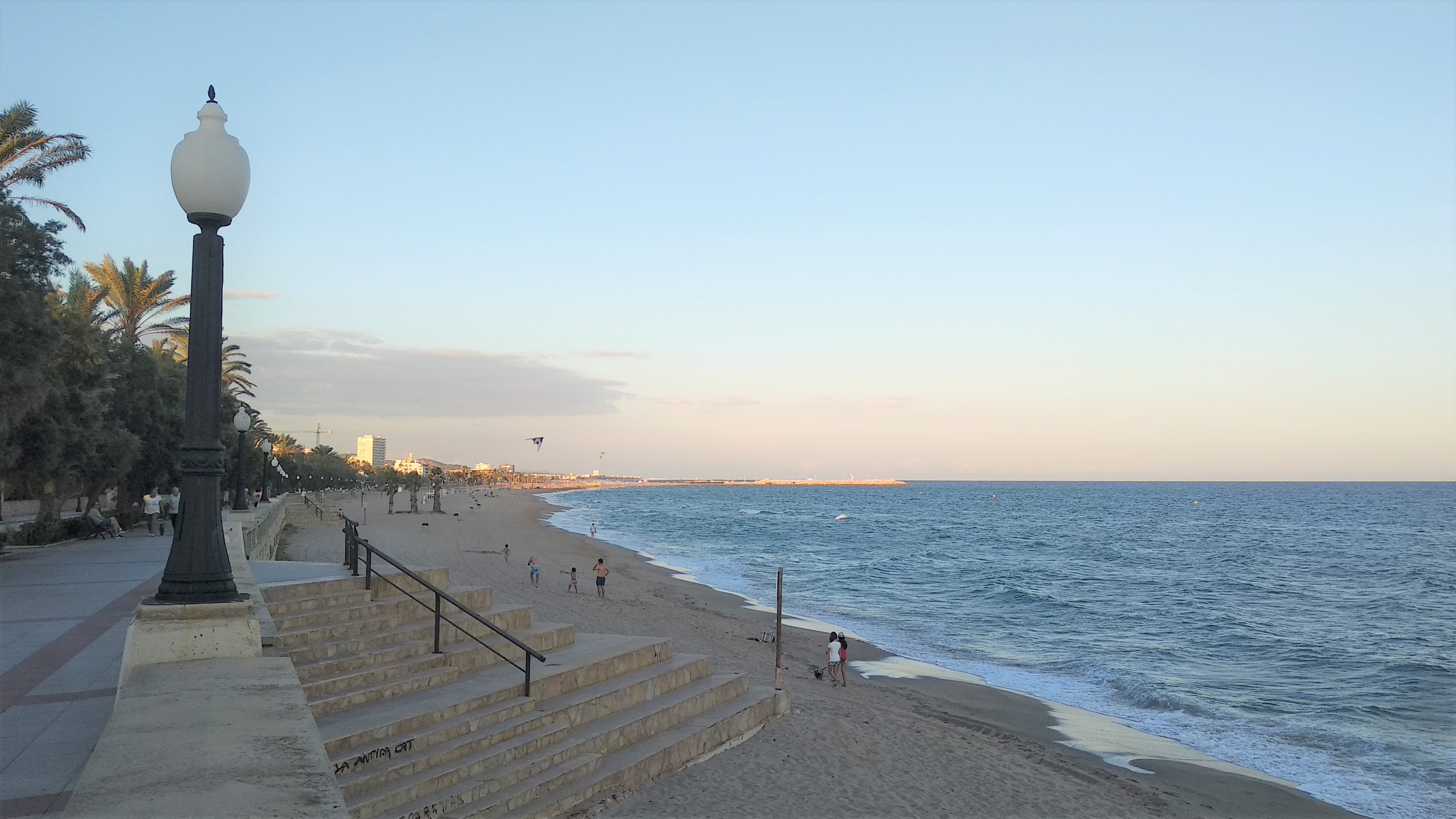
- Coma-ruga Beach

- Location in Catalonia
- Coordinates: 41°10′52″N 1°31′29″E
- Country: Spain
- Community: Catalonia
- Province: Tarragona
- Comarca: Baix Penedès
- Elevation: 0 m (0 ft)

Population (2015)
  - Total: 4,074

Coma-ruga (Catalan pronunciation: [ˌkoməˈruɣə]; Spanish: Comarruga) is a seaside resort in the municipality of El Vendrell, in the province of Tarragona (Catalonia, Spain). It stretches along the 2.3 km long Beach of Coma-ruga.

Until 1946 it made part of the former municipality of Sant Vicenç de Calders.

== Location ==
Comar-ruga is located in the eastern part of the Costa Dorada, some 55 km to the West of Barcelona-El Prat Airport, near the popular tourist resorts of Calafell and Torredembarra. Developed in the 1950s and 1960s, Coma-ruga has become a popular tourist destination, particularly for families. A fine beach of golden sand stretching along more than 2 km is its main attraction.

== Climate ==
Coma-ruga has a Typical Mediterranean climate (Köppen climate classification: Csa) characterized with mild winters and hot summers. The rainiest season is the autumn, and the driest season is the summer. The sunshine hours are above 2,500.

Climate data for Coma-ruga
| Month | Jan | Feb | Mar | Apr | May | Jun | Jul | Aug | Sep | Oct | Nov | Dec | Year |
|---|---|---|---|---|---|---|---|---|---|---|---|---|---|
| Mean daily maximum °C (°F) | 13 (55) | 14 (57) | 15 (59) | 17 (63) | 20 (68) | 24 (75) | 27 (81) | 27 (81) | 25 (77) | 21 (70) | 16 (61) | 13 (55) | 19.3 (66.7) |
| Mean daily minimum °C (°F) | 4 (39) | 5 (41) | 6 (43) | 8 (46) | 11 (52) | 15 (59) | 18 (64) | 19 (66) | 16 (61) | 12 (54) | 8 (46) | 5 (41) | 10.6 (51.1) |
| Average precipitation mm (inches) | 40 (1.6) | 35 (1.4) | 50 (2.0) | 47 (1.9) | 57 (2.2) | 41 (1.6) | 25 (1.0) | 50 (2.0) | 69 (2.7) | 84 (3.3) | 54 (2.1) | 44 (1.7) | 596 (23.5) |
| Average precipitation days (≥ 1 mm) | 12 | 11 | 11 | 11 | 11 | 8 | 5 | 8 | 8 | 10 | 11 | 12 | 118 |
| Mean monthly sunshine hours | 155 | 168 | 186 | 210 | 248 | 270 | 310 | 279 | 210 | 186 | 150 | 155 | 2,527 |
Source: weather2travel

== History ==
The first written reference to Coma-ruga appears in 1180, when the abbot of Sant Cugat granted to Arnau Sunyer i Berenguer the place named "ipsum vilare de Coma Ruga", near the castles of Calders and Saint Vincent. The concession didn't grant the property of the pond of Coma-ruga, which belonged to the Monastery of Sant Cugat.

In 1183 the abbot of the Monastery of Sant Cugat granted additional rights in favour of Bernat de Papiol who accepted the compromise of guarding and defending the properties of the monastery and its inhabitants.

In 1887 the train station of Sant Vicenç de Calders was built within the lands of Coma-ruga. During the 20th century, this train station became one of the most important railway intersections in Catalonia. Due to this reason, a small neighborhood developed around it, mostly of railway workers and its families. During the Spanish Civil War, this station was attacked several times by the fascist army of General Franco. Due to the collaboration of Italian airplanes (hydroplanes) during the Christmas holidays of 1938 (between the 25th and the 29th), Coma-ruga was heavily bombed causing dozens of casualties.

In 1892 the hot springs of the pond and small creek (riuet) of Coma-ruga were declared of public interest for its health properties by the Royal Academy of Medicine and Surgery of Barcelona. In 1920 a Hotel and Spa was built near the pond. This started the urban development of Coma-ruga which later in the 1960s and 1970s would become an important tourist town.

== Demography ==
=== Population ===
In 2015 the population of Coma-ruga was 4,074.

=== Languages ===
The two official languages are Spanish and Catalan. The regional and local governments almost exclusively use Catalan and public signs are usually written in this language. Spanish is the language of business and the most commonly spoken language among residents and visitors.

Most young people have some knowledge of English. People working in the tourism industry may also speak other languages (French, Dutch, Russian, etc.).

=== Religion ===
There is a Roman Catholic church, built in 1956-57. Masses are offered in Spanish and Catalan.

== Infrastructure ==
=== Transportation ===
- Barcelona–El Prat Airport is located 56 km to the east of Coma-ruga. There is a train connection from Sant Vicenç de Calders station, through Barcelona-Sants every 30 minutes.
- Coma-ruga's railway station (the official name is Sant Vicenç de Calders) is mostly used by commuter trains. Most of the day there are 3 trains per hour to Barcelona and 1-2 to Tarragona (2017).
- Camp de Tarragona railway station, at 33 km to the west. It is used by the high-speed trains (AVE) Barcelona-Madrid. There are eleven connections per day (2017).
- Coma-ruga is served by three motorways: AP-2 (El Vendrell-Zaragoza, and then to Madrid), AP-7 (French border-Vera) and C-32 (Autopista Pau Casals), to Barcelona–El Prat Airport and Barcelona along the coast.

=== Healthcare ===
- The nearest hospital (Hospital Comarcal del Vendrell) is located at El Vendrell, 8 km to the northeast.

== Tourism ==
=== Tourist Information ===
- The Tourist Information Office is located at Av. Brisamar, 1 (Coords: N 41º 10. 952' E 001º 31. 319').

=== Nearby attractions ===
- Vil·la Casals, the house-museum of cellist Pau Casals. 2.5 km to the east.
- Arc de Berà. Roman, 1st century BC. 6.6 km to the west.
- Scipions Tower. Roman, 1st century BC. 21 km to the west.
- Les Ferreres Aqueduct, also known as Devil's Bridge. Roman, probably from the reign of Augustus (27 BC–14 AD). 30 km to the west.
- Tarragona. The Roman ruins of Tarraco (old name of Tarragona) have been designated a World Heritage Site by UNESCO. Another interesting building is the Cathedral, dating to the 12th-13th centuries and combining Romanesque and Gothic architectural elements. 31 km to the west.
- Santes Creus Monastery. Gothic style, 12th-13th century. 35 km to the northwest.

=== Marina ===
- The Coma-ruga Marina was built in 1976 and is managed by the Club Nàutic Coma-ruga.

=== Photo Gallery ===
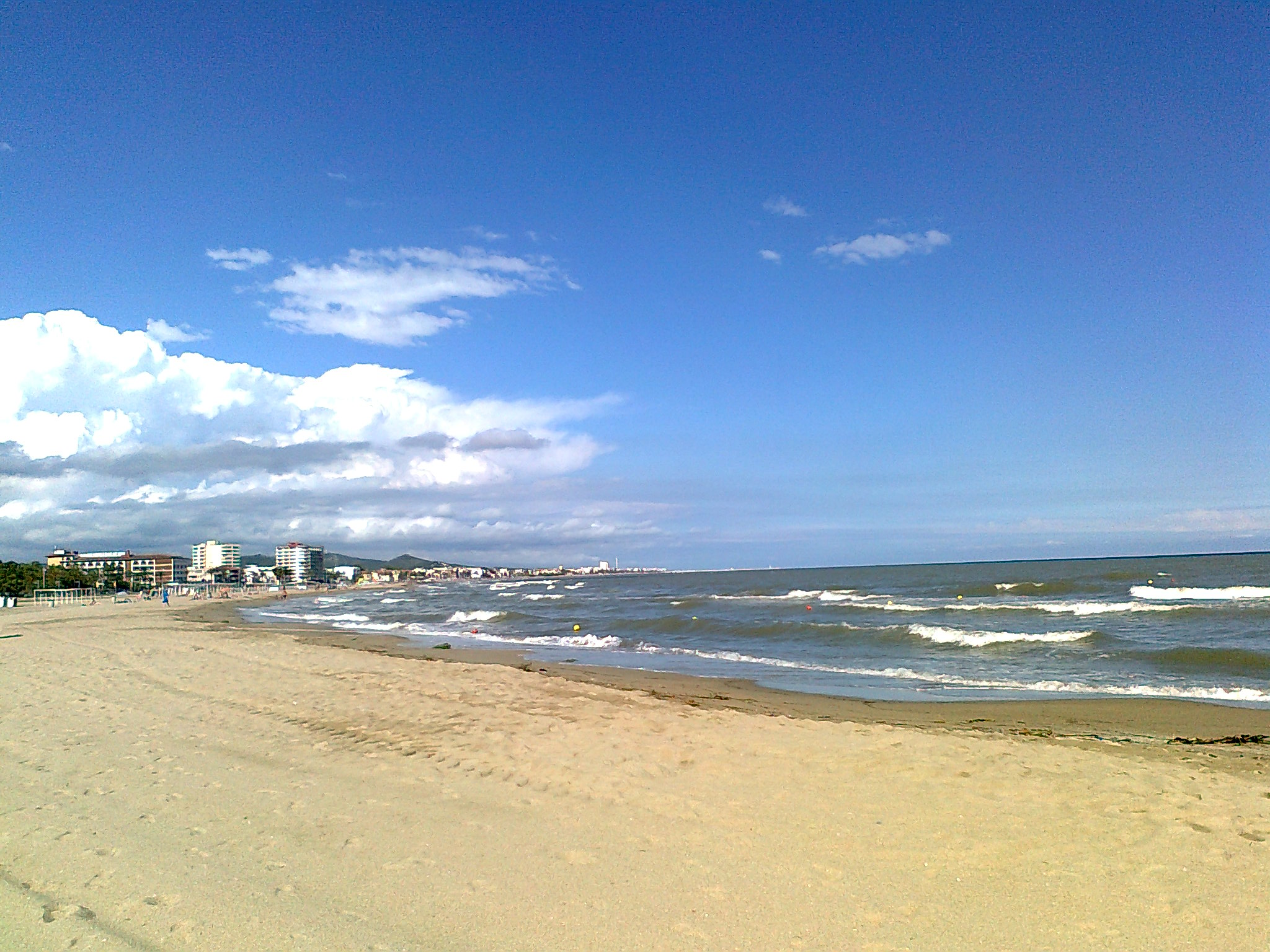
Beach. View from the West

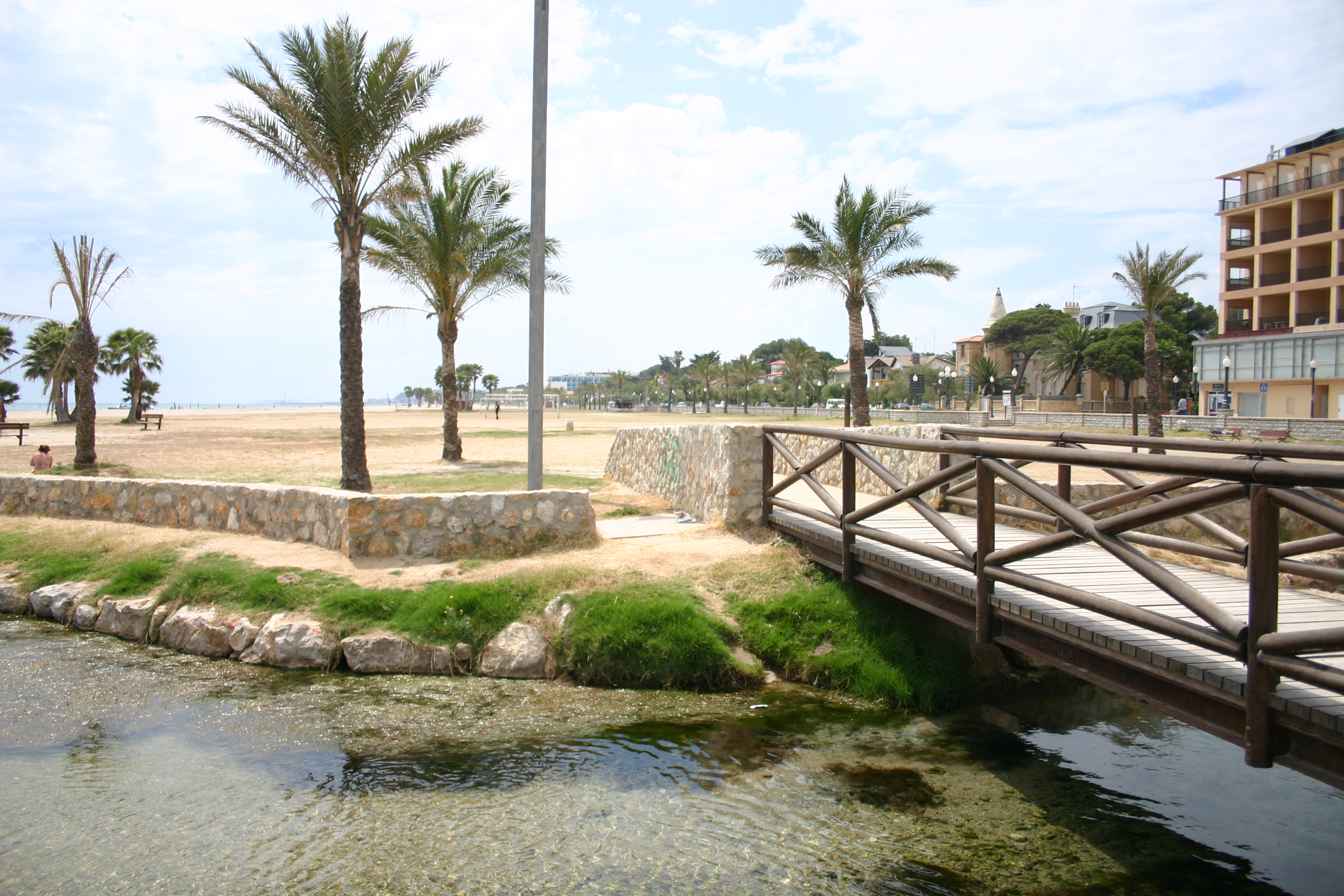
The Creek (riuet)

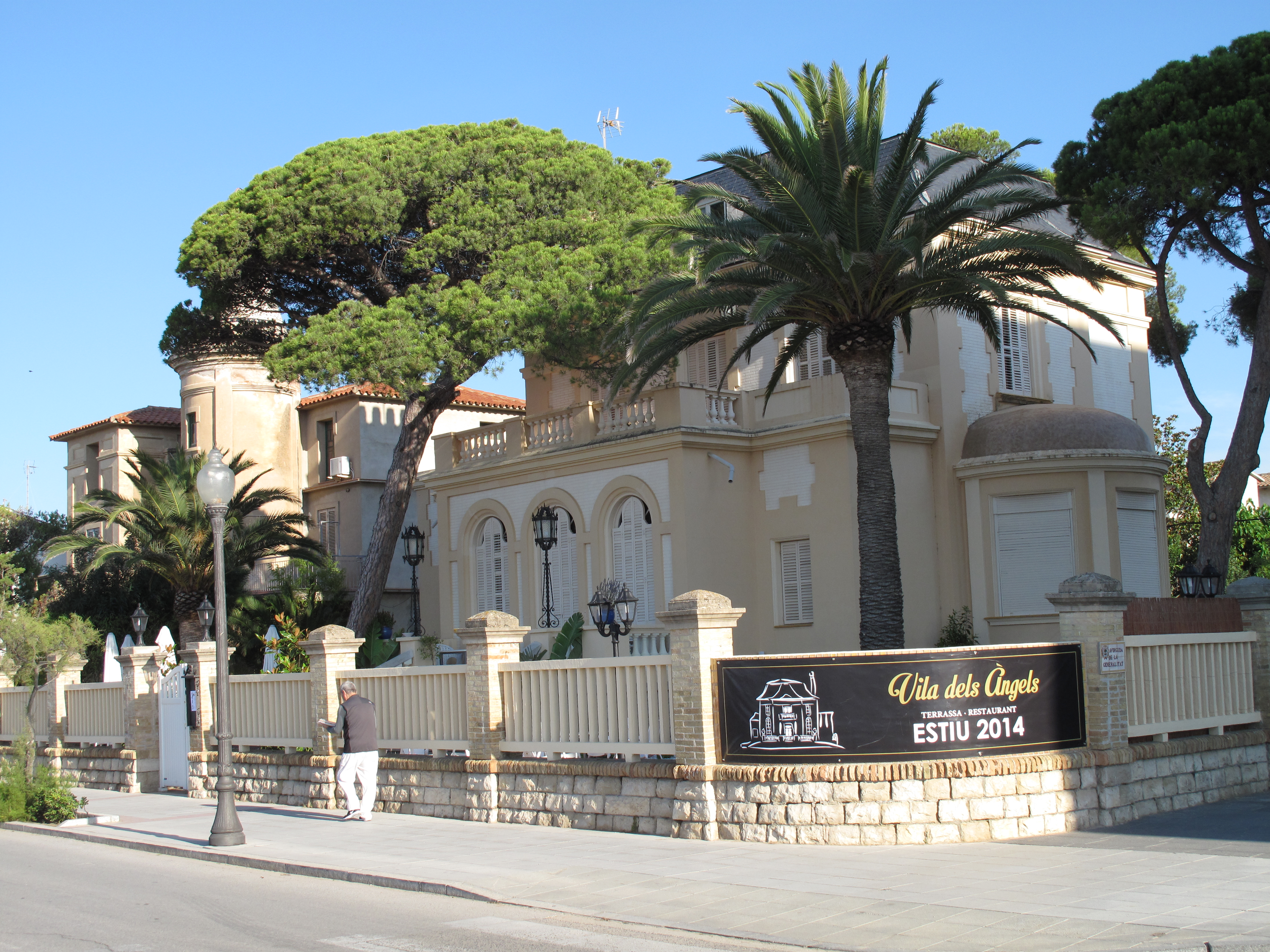
Villa Buenaventura (1933)

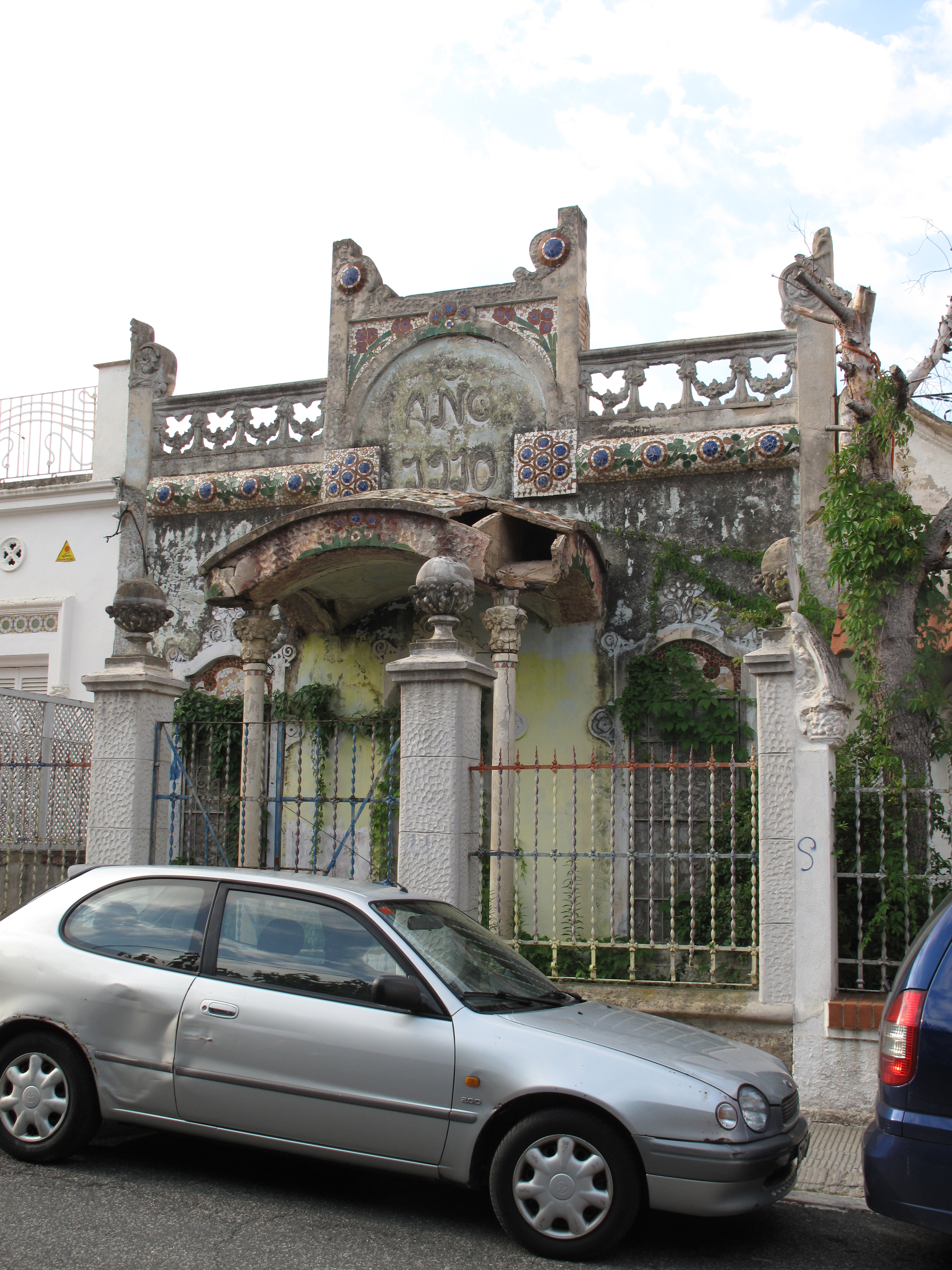
Villa Torres (Art Nouveau style) (1910)

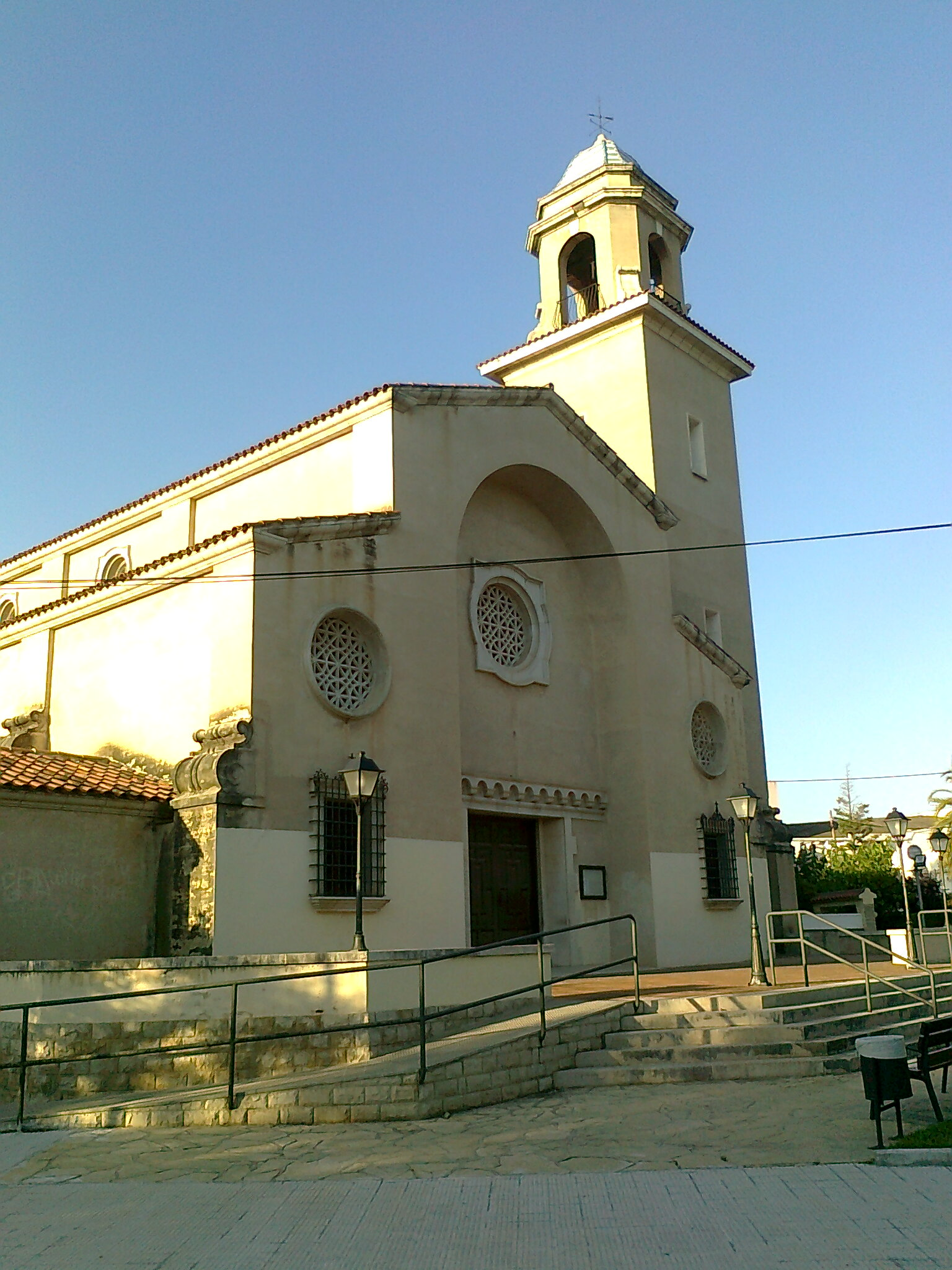
Roman Catholic Church of Saint Raymond Nonnatus (1956–57)
