= Autovía A-7 =

Road in Spain

Coordinates: 42°25′28″N 2°51′57″E

Autovía A-7
- Autovía del Mediterráneo
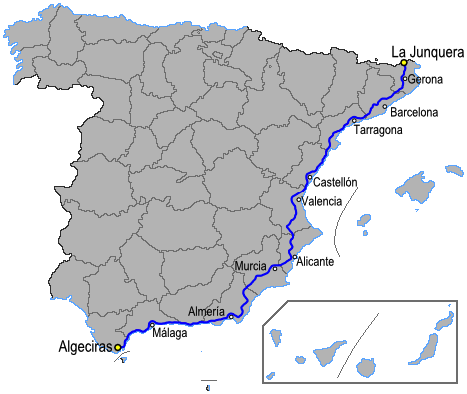

Route information
- Length: 1,300 km (810 mi)

Major junctions
- From: La Jonquera
- To: Algeciras

Location
- Country: Spain

Highway system
- Highways in Spain; Autopistas and autovías; National Roads

The Autovía A-7 (also called Autovia del Mediterráneo) is a Spanish autovía (toll-free limited-access highway) which starts in La Jonquera, near the French frontier and ends in Algeciras. It was finally finished in late 2015 upon completion of sections west of Almeria and around Motril, is a free alternative route to the tolled Autopista AP-7, and is the longest national motorway in Europe.

== Sections ==
#	From	To	Length
1	La Jonquera	Figueres	20.44 km
2	Figueres	Girona	48.03 km
3	Girona	Maçanet de la Selva	25.41 km
4	Maçanet de la Selva	Cardedeu	39.61 km
5	Cardedeu	Granollers	8.44 km
6	Granollers	Montmeló	8.48 km
7	Montmeló	El Papiol	34.70 km
8	El Papiol	Martorell	12.67 km
9	Martorell	Vilafranca del Penedès	26.94 km
10	Vilafranca del Penedès	Comarruga	28.66 km
11	Comarruga	Altafulla	14.81 km
12	Altafulla	Tarragona	11.23 km
13	Tarragona	Salou	14.28 km
14	Salou	Amposta	72.31 km
15	Amposta	Peñíscola	52.46 km

#	From	To	Length
16	Peñíscola	Torreblanca	31.92 km
17	Torreblanca	Sagunt/Sagunto	83.52 km
18	Sagunt/Sagunto	Ondara	131.99 km
19	Ondara	Altea	35.10 km
20	Altea	Sant Joan d'Alacant	44.53 km
21	Sant Joan d'Alacant	Elche	10.31 km
22	Elche	Murcia	82.29 km
23	Murcia	Lorca	71.57 km
24	Lorca	Vera	64.08 km
25	Vera	Almería	85.53 km
26	Almería	Adra	57.26 km
27	Adra	Motril	52.85 km
28	Motril	Nerja	39.24 km
29	Nerja	Málaga	58.75 km
30	Málaga	Benalmádena	22.54 km
31	Benalmádena	Estepona	64.79 km
32	Estepona	Guadiaro	25.64 km
33	Guadiaro	Algeciras	26.85 km

== Major cities crossed ==
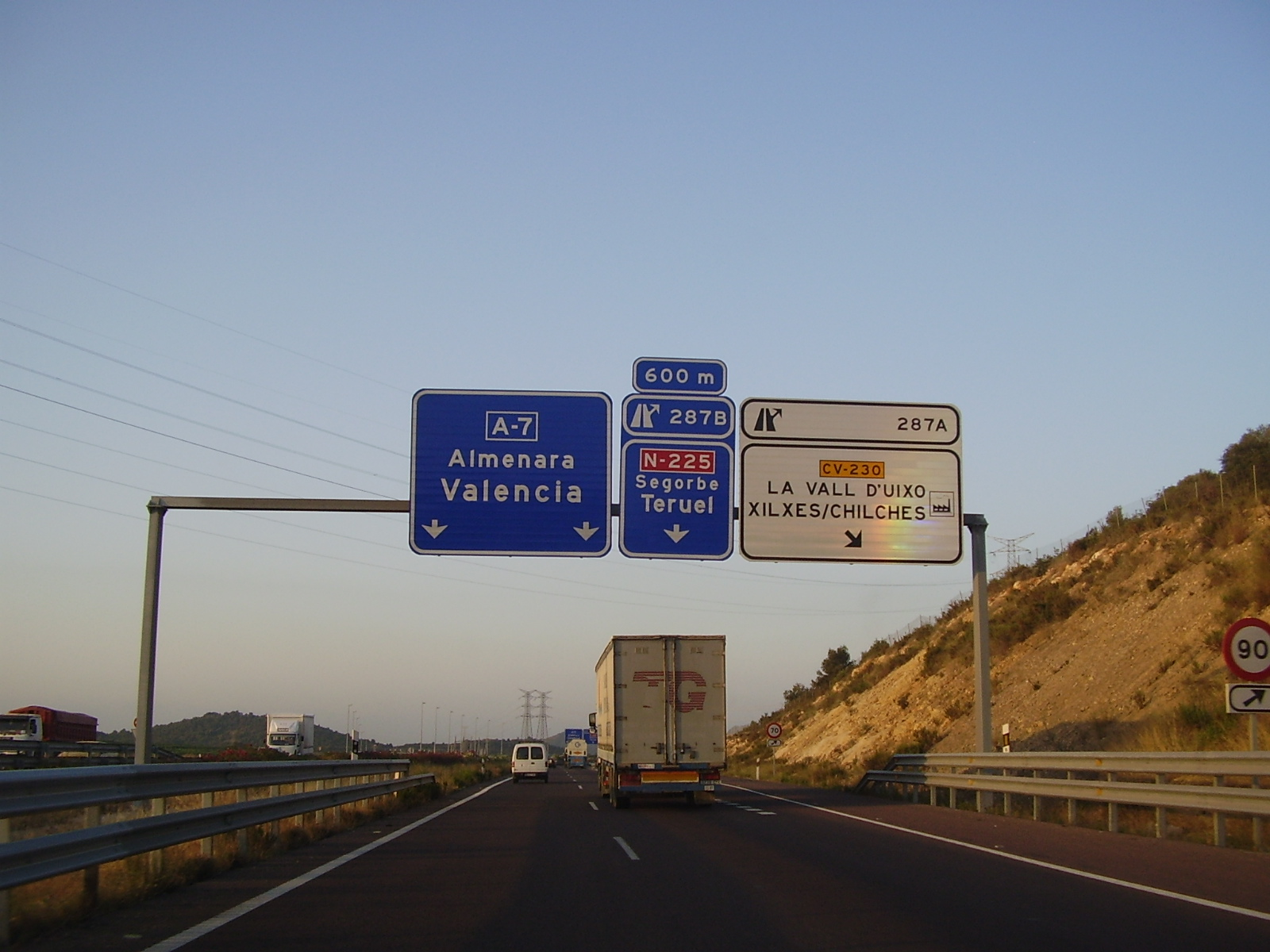
The Autovía A-7 through Castelló de la Plana

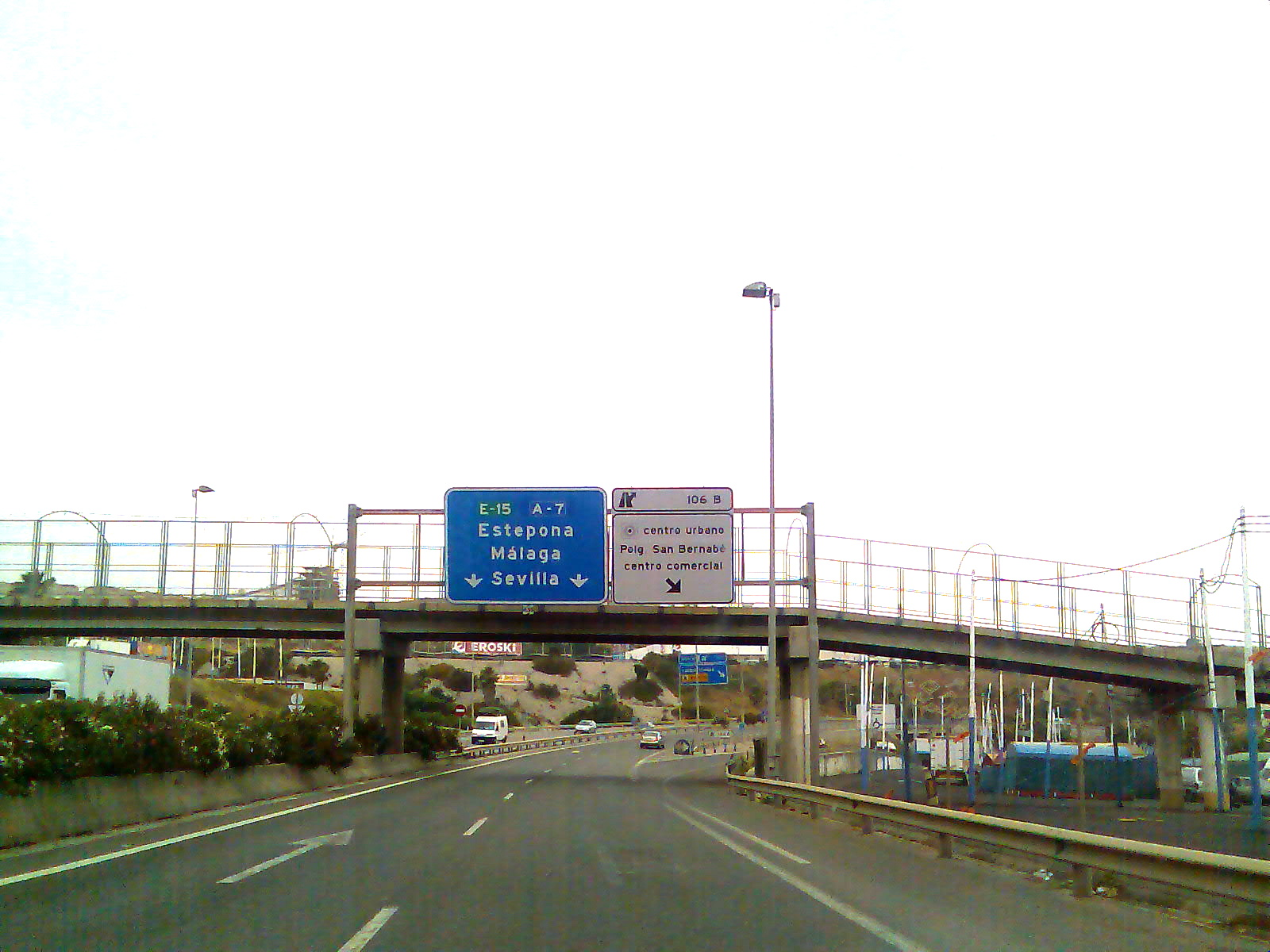
A-7 in Algeciras

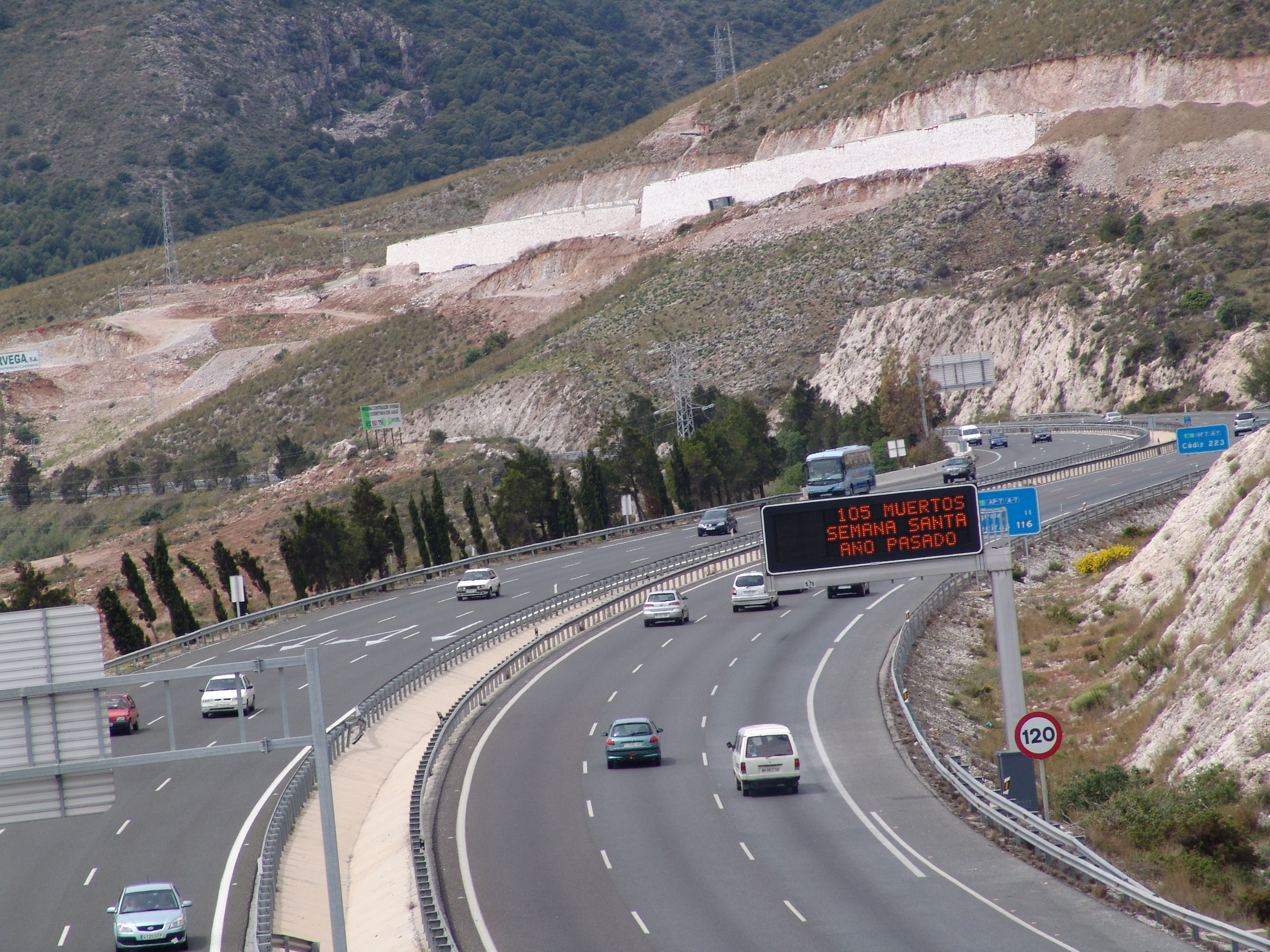
A-7 in Málaga

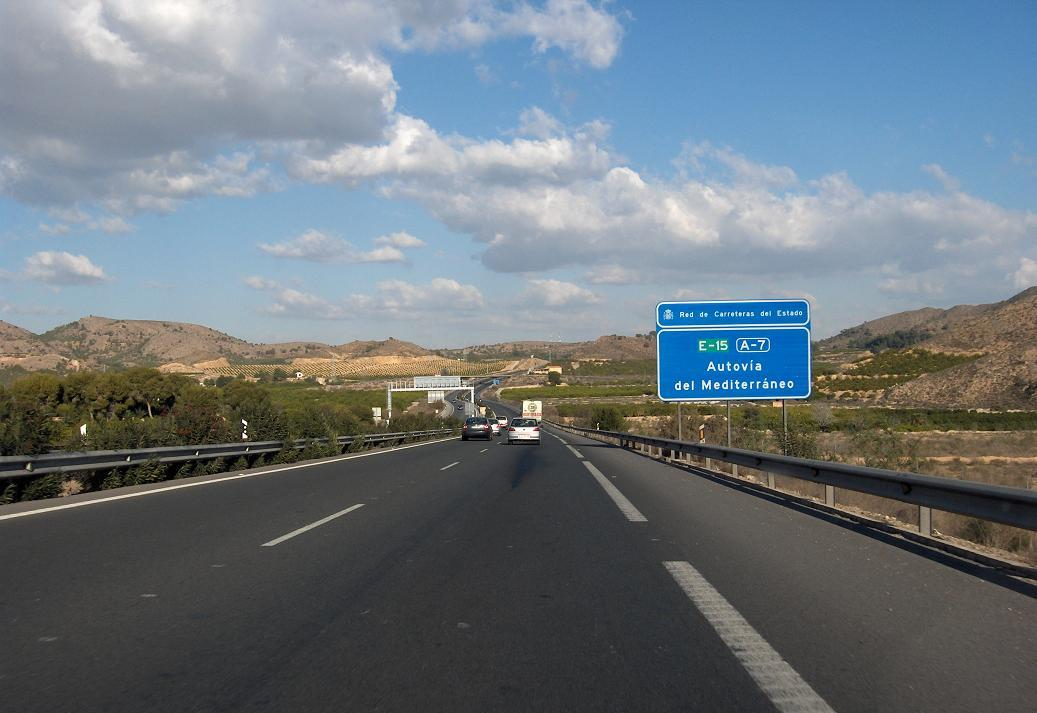
A-7 in Murcia

- Figueres
- Girona
- Granollers
- Martorell
- Vilafranca del Penedès
- Tarragona
- Amposta
- Benicarló
- Oropesa del Mar/Orpesa
- Benicàssim
- Castellón de la Plana
- Vila-real
- Sagunt/Sagunto
- Valencia
- Torrent
- Gandia
- Altea
- Benidorm
- La Vila Joiosa
- Alicante
- Elche
- Murcia
- Lorca
- Almería
- El Ejido
- Adra
- Motril
- Almuñécar
- Málaga
- Torremolinos
- Benalmádena
- Fuengirola
- Marbella
- Estepona
- Algeciras

== See also ==
- N-340 road (Spain)
