= Bombing of Granollers =

Attack by military aircraft during the Spanish Civil War

Coordinates: 41°37′N 2°18′E

- Part of the Spanish Civil War
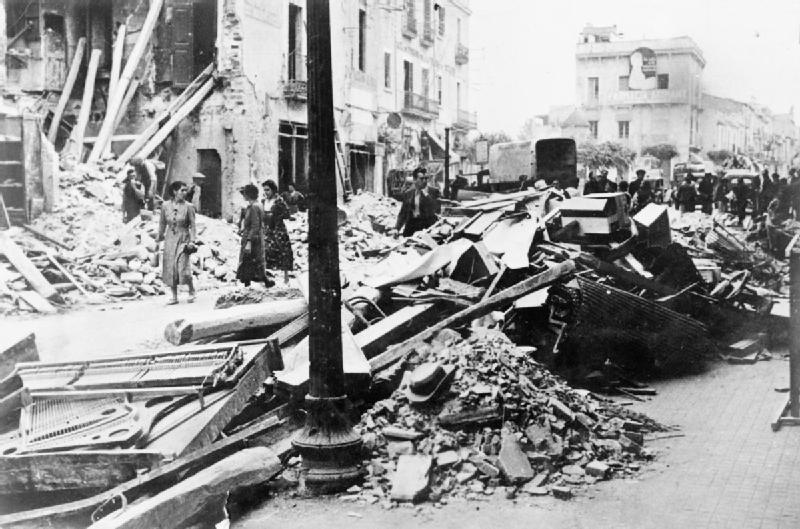
- Granollers after the Bombing.
Date	31 May 1938
Location	Granollers, Catalonia, Spain
Result	Hundreds of civilians killed

Belligerents
Spanish Republic	Nationalist Spain (Kingdom of Italy) Aviazione Legionaria

Commanders and leaders
?	?

Strength
Anti-aircraft artillery	5 Sa-79 and Sa-81 Italian bombers

Casualties and losses
100–224 civilians killed	None

The bombing of Granollers took place during the Spanish Civil War in 1938. On 31 May 1938, the Italian Aviazione Legionaria bombed the town of Granollers. There were between 100 and 224 civilian deaths.

== Background ==
On 16 April 1938, the Anglo-Italian pact was signed. Italy accepted to withdraw her troops from Spain once the war was over and the countries agreed to guarantee the status quo in the Mediterranean. Nevertheless, Italy sent three thousand troops to Spain on 11 April and the Italians continued their bombings against Republican Spain. Franco wanted to eliminate the Republican maritime commerce and destroy the Republican morale. To achieve this, he authorized the Aviazione Legionaria and the Legion Condor to undertake indiscriminate bombings of the Republican cities. Valencia, Barcelona, Alicante and other Spanish cities were bombed.

== The Bombing ==
On 31 May, five Italian bombers of the Aviazione Legionaria, bombed the city of Granollers. The town, 20 miles north of Barcelona, had no military targets. The bombers dropped 40 bombs of 100 kilograms in the city center. There were between 100 and 224 civilian dead (most of them women and children). The British government sent two officers to carry out an enquiry and they reported that the bombing must have been often aimed at non-military targets.

== Aftermath ==
The British government and the Vatican protested to Burgos, Berlin, and Rome. Ciano said that Franco ordered the attacks and the Italians were not responsible, but he promised to do what he could, nevertheless he said to the German ambassador that: "Actually, we have, of course, done nothing, and have no intention of doing anything either".

== See also ==
- Preston, Paul. The Spanish Civil War. Reaction, revolution & revenge. Harper Perennial. 2006. London. ISBN 978-0-00-723207-9 ISBN 0-00-723207-1
- Thomas, Hugh. The Spanish Civil War. Penguin Books. 2001. London. ISBN 978-0-14-101161-5
