= Pietro Pinna Parpaglia =

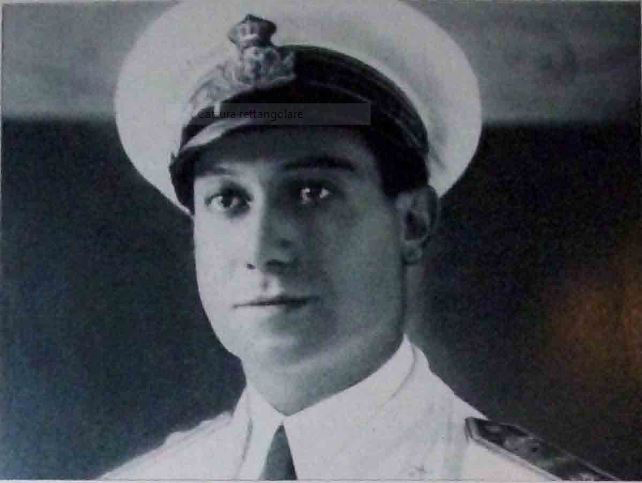
- Born: 12 January 1891; Pozzomaggiore, Kingdom of Italy
- Died: 9 October 1966 (aged 75); Pozzomaggiore, Italy
- Military career
- Allegiance: Kingdom of Italy; Italy
- Branch: Regia Aeronautica; Italian Air Force
- Rank: Air Fleet General
- Commands: 39th Air Squadron; Fifth Air Group; 27th Air Squadron; 2nd Wing; 13th Wing; Italian East African Air Force Command
- Conflicts: World War I; World War II; East African campaign; Battle of Amba Alagi
- Awards: Silver Medal of Military Valour (twice); Bronze Medal of Military Valour; War Cross for Military Valor; Military Order of Savoy; Order of Saints Maurice and Lazarus

Pietro Pinna Parpaglia (Pozzomaggiore, 12 January 1891 – 9 October 1966) was a general in the Royal Italian Air Force during World War II, Deputy Chief of Staff of the Regia Aeronautica from 1933 to 1939 and commander-in-chief of the Air Force in Italian East Africa from 1939 to 1941.

== Biography ==
=== Early life and World War I ===
He was born in Pozzomaggiore on January 12, 1891, to a family of landowners. He studied law and graduate in 1913; among his classmates were Palmiro Togliatti and Mario Berlinguer, future leaders of the Italian Communist Party. Shortly after graduation, he began his career in the Italian judiciary, but after the Kingdom of Italy entered World War I on 24 May 1915, he volunteered in the Royal Italian Army with the rank of second lieutenant, assigned to the 46th Field Artillery Regiment. In 1916 he was promoted to lieutenant for war merit, and applied to join the Air Force as a navigator. From the beginning of 1917 he was assigned to the 43rd Squadron, supporting the artillery of the 5th Group of the Third Army, equipped with Caudron G.3 aircraft; on 12 and 18 March 1917 he carried out two risky reconnaissance missions over Gorjansko and Kobjeglava.

After promotion to captain, on 1 August 1917 he was assigned to the 72nd Fighter Squadron based in Ghedi and on 12 October 1917 he was transferred to the 120th Squadron of Castenedolo, flying SAML S.1 aircraft. On 3 December he assumed command of the 39th Squadron, based in Cà Tessera. On May 14, 1918, his unit, equipped with Savoia-Pomilio SP.3 and SAML aircraft, was transferred to the new Malcontenta airfield, with the task of assisting the firing of the artillery of the XXVIII Army Corps. The squadron also carried out bombing and reconnaissance missions, and launched propaganda leaflets on occupied Italian territories, until the end of hostilities, on November 4, 1918. By the end of the war Pinna Parpaglia commanded Fifth Air Group and had been awarded a Silver Medal of Military Valour and a Bronze Medal of Military Valour. In 1919, after obtaining a pilot license, he was given command of the 27th Squadron.

=== Interwar years ===
In 1923 he was transferred to the newly established Regia Aeronautica, rapidly climbing its hierarchy; he held the posts of Director of the Air Observation School, Chief of the Aeronautical Technical Consultant Office at the General Staff, and Technical Aeronautical Consultant at the Italian Delegation in Geneva.

From October 1928 to September 1929 he was commander of the 2nd Wing, and after promotion to colonel in 1930, from 1 November 1931 to 31 October 1932 he commanded the 13th Wing. In 1933 he was promoted to Air Brigade General (equivalent to air commodore), and on 15 October of the same year he replaced General Francesco Pricolo in the position of Deputy Chief of Staff of the Regia Aeronautica. He held this position until December 1, 1939, when he was replaced by General Giuseppe Santoro, having meanwhile been promoted to Air Division General (equivalent to air vice marshal) in 1934. On 14 August 1936 he replaced General Mario Ajmone Cat as commander of the Italian East African Air Force Command, personally carrying out reconnaissance, bombing and strafing missions against Ethiopian guerrillas; for his ideation, planning and execution of an air assault that resulted in the occupation of Dembidolo on 11 November 1936, he was awarded another silver medal for military valor and promoted to Air Fleet General (equivalent to air marshal). On 4 December of the same year he was replaced by General Aurelio Liotta as commander-in-chief of the Regia Aeronautica in East Africa, and repatriated, returning to his office as deputy chief of staff.

In 1939 he became Grand Officer of the Order of Saints Maurice and Lazarus, and in December of the same year he returned again to Italian East Africa as commander of the air forces present in that theatre, replacing General Gennaro Tedeschini Lalli. His headquarters were located in Addis Ababa.

=== World War II and later years ===
On June 10, 1940, Italy entered World War II, and Pinna Parpaglia commanded the forces of the Regia Aeronautica of the Empire during the subsequent East African campaign. His forces at the start of the war numbered 325 aircraft of all types, including 244 bombers, 69 fighters, 25 transport aircraft, and thirteen reconnaissance aircraft; only 183, however, were combat ready (142 bombers, thirty-six fighters, and nine reconnaissance planes), and their use was hampered by limited fuel and ammunition reserves and lack of spare parts. Most models were obsolete, with only twelve bombers and twenty-four fighters belonging to modern types. With these meager forces, Pinna was tasked with the air defence of an area six times the size of the Italian homeland, as well as with conducting offensive operations against British airfields, ports and naval units at sea.

By the spring of 1941, Pinna's forces had been effectively annihilated; in April he left Addis Ababa and followed the Duke of Aosta to the mountain redoubt of Amba Alagi, where his remaining men fought as infantry. After a weeks-long siege, he was captured by the British along with the Duke and Generals Marino Valletti-Borgnini, Luigi Frusci and Claudio Trezzani in May 1941. Pinna was then sent to India, at the Prem Nagar POW camp, eight miles east of Dehradun. On 20 December 1942 he was transferred to the United States and imprisoned at Camp Monticello, Arkansas.

After the fall of Fascism (25 July 1943) and the Armistice of Cassibile (8 September 1943), he wrote a letter to the president of the United States Franklin Delano Roosevelt, inviting him to encourage the creation of combat units composed of former Italian prisoners of war, to be used against the now common German enemy. This initiative obtained the support of the mayor of New York Fiorello La Guardia, who had flown with Pinna during World War I. Due to his pro-Allied position, the Allies released Pinna and allowed him to return to Italy. On 27 January 1944 the Allied military government appointed him High Commissioner for Sardinia. He supervised the process of economic, political and social reconstruction of the island, and his initiatives included the establishment of the Cagliari trade fair and the construction of the Alghero airport. He was confirmed in the post during the Parri government and the first five De Gasperi governments, remaining in office until May 28, 1949, when the first elections of the Regional Council were held. The appointment as High Commissioner automatically made him a member of the National Council. During 1949 he was recalled to military service as Director General of Civil Aviation and Air Traffic and, in 1953, he became Councilor of State until 1961, when he retired with the rank of President of jurisdictional section.

He retired to his hometown of Pozzomaggiore, where he spent the last six years of his life, dying on 9 October 1966.
