= Ceuta and Melilla =

Ceuta and Melilla may refer to:

- Spain's two autonomous cities, Ceuta and Melilla, which are often referred to together
- In a wider sense, to all the modern Spanish possessions in North Africa (i.e. Ceuta and Melilla, plus other adjacent minor territories, known in Spanish as plazas de soberanía)
- Spanish Africa (disambiguation)
- Spanish North Africa (disambiguation)
- Spanish protectorate in Morocco, established on 27 November 1912 by a treaty between France and Spain that converted the Spanish sphere of influence into a formal protectorate
  - List of Spanish colonial wars in Morocco
