= Spanish Africa =

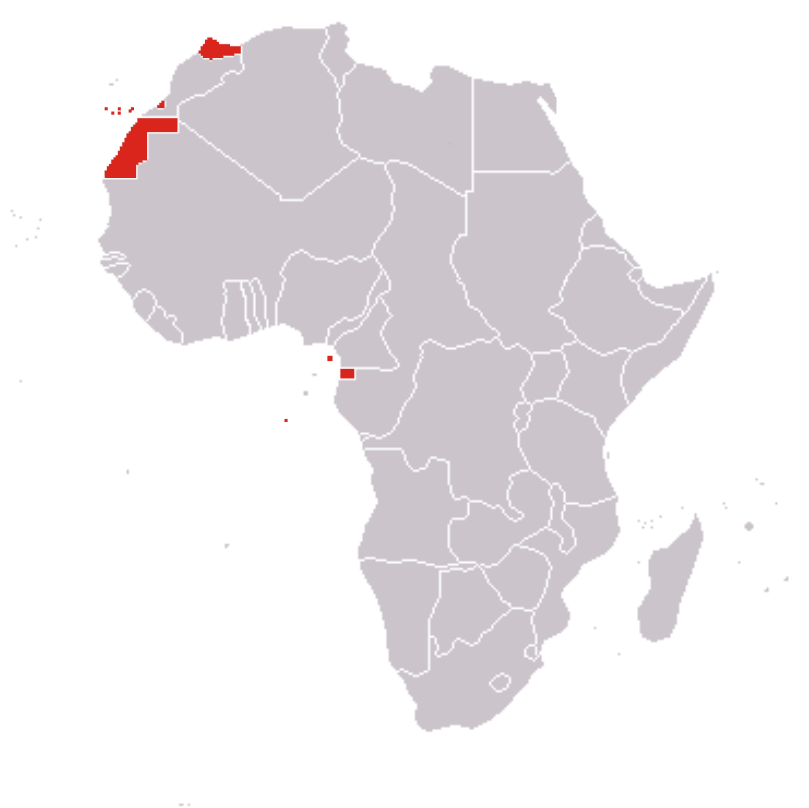
Spanish colonies in Africa in 1950.

Spanish Africa may refer to:

- Spanish North Africa (disambiguation)
  - Contemporary Spanish North Africa, i.e. Spain's autonomous cities
    - Ceuta, on the north coast of Africa
    - Melilla, on the north coast of Africa
    - Plazas de soberanía, sovereign territories scattered along the Mediterranean coast bordering Morocco
    - Canary Islands, an archipelago off the coast of Morocco
  - Spanish protectorate of Morocco (1912–1956)
  - Spanish Oran (1509–1708, 1732–1792), territory of the Spanish Empire
- Spanish West Africa (1946–1958)
  - Spanish Sahara (1884–1976), which included the provinces of Río de Oro and Saguia el-Hamra, now Moroccan-administered Western Sahara
  - Cape Juby, on the coast of southern Morocco, part of the Spanish protectorate prior to 1958
  - Ifni, on the coast of southern Morocco, part of Spain prior to 1969, now Moroccan province Sidi Ifni
- Spanish Guinea (1926–1968), now Equatorial Guinea
  - Annobón, established 1778
  - Fernando Pó, established 1778
  - Río Muni, established 1778

== See also ==
- Ceuta and Melilla (disambiguation)
- Canary Islands
