= Aviazione Legionaria =

Italian military unit, 1936–1939

Legionary Air Force
- Aviazione Legionaria
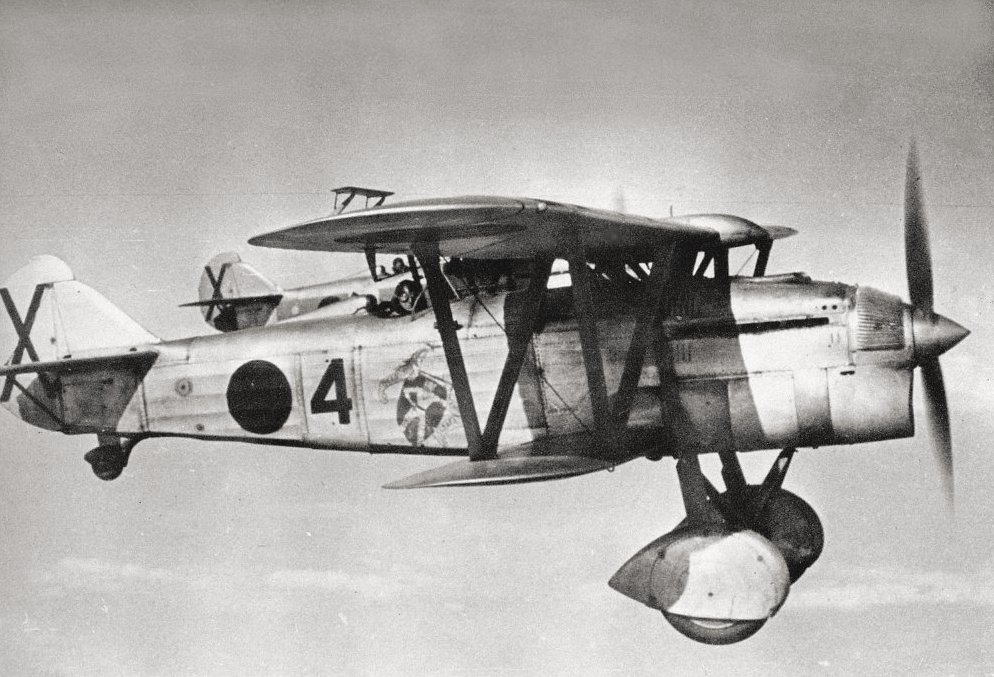
- A pair of Fiat C.R.32s of the X Gruppo "Baleari"
- Active: 28 December 1936 – 10 March 1939
- Country: Kingdom of Italy
- Allegiance: Spanish State
- Branch: Regia Aeronautica
- Air base: Son Bonet, Mallorca
- Conflict: Spanish Civil War
- Flying hours: 135,265

Commanders
- Notable commanders: Ruggero Bonomi; Vincenzo Velardi; Mario Bernasconi; Giuseppe Maceratini; Adriano Monti

Insignia

The Legionary Air Force (Italian: Aviazione Legionaria, Spanish: Aviación Legionaria) was an expeditionary corps from the Italian Royal Air Force that was set up in 1936. It was sent to provide logistical and tactical support to the Nationalist faction after the Spanish coup of July 1936, which marked the onset of the Spanish Civil War.

The corps and its Nazi German allies, the Condor Legion, fought against the Spanish Republic and provided support for the Italian ground troops of the Corpo Truppe Volontarie. They served from August 1936 to the end of the conflict, in March 1939. Their main base of operations was on Mallorca, in the Balearic Islands.

== History ==
At the outbreak of the Spanish Civil War in July 1936, Francisco Franco, the leader of the rebel armies in Spanish North Africa, had about 30,000 troops and Moroccan nationals under his command, along with some artillery units. To transfer his troops and equipment to Mainland Spain, Franco on 24 July 1936 turned to the Italian consul in Tangiers and then directly to Major Luccardi, the military attaché at the Italian consulate.

Through them, Franco tried to convince Benito Mussolini to send twelve transport aircraft, twelve reconnaissance planes, ten fighter aircraft, 3000 aerial bombs, anti-aircraft machine guns and at least forty-five transport ships. Mussolini was initially reluctant to send them, despite his sympathy for Franco, but under pressure from his son-in-law, Galeazzo Ciano, he changed his mind on 25 July. Ciano had in the meantime met with representatives of the Spanish monarchy to arrange the transfer of about thirty fighter planes and other equipment, which would arrive on 2 August, that would be sent by the French government.

On 27 July, Mussolini ordered the undersecretary for the Regia Aeronautica, General Giuseppe Valle, to send 12 three-engined Savoia-Marchetti SM.81 bombers with crews and relevant specialists to Franco. They would form the first unit, initially known as Aviación del Tercio, and set out at dawn on 30 July from Cagliari–Elmas on Sardinia, where they had picked up three officials from the Scuola di Navigazione di Altura at Orbetello, the gerarca Ettore Muti, and Lieutenant Colonel Ruggero Bonomi.

The aircraft crews and the specialists were all volunteers from 7th, 10th and 13th Stormo and were provided with civilian clothes and fake documents. All Italian insignia on the planes had been blotted out to avoid an international incident with European governments that supported the Republicans. Fake documents stated that the planes were being sold to the Spanish journalist Luis Bolín.

Not all of the Italian planes sent to aid the rebel faction reached Morocco since the plane commanded by Angelini crashed in the Mediterranean, that of Mattalia crashed near Saïda in French Morocco, and Lo Forte had to make an emergency landing near Berkane (also in French Morocco) and was seized by the local authorities. The nine survivors of the Moroccan crashes were provided with Nationalist papers and transportation to the airport at Tetuan from which, over the following days, they helped escort the transport ships Araujo, Ciudad de Alicante and Ciudad de Ceuta. They together carried 4,000 men, four artillery batteries, two million cartridges and 12 tons of other munitions to mainland Spain.

Encouraged by the success of this first operation, Mussolini began sending a steady stream of munitions, personnel and supplies under the name of Aviación Legionaria or Aviazione Legionaria.

=== Bombing operations ===
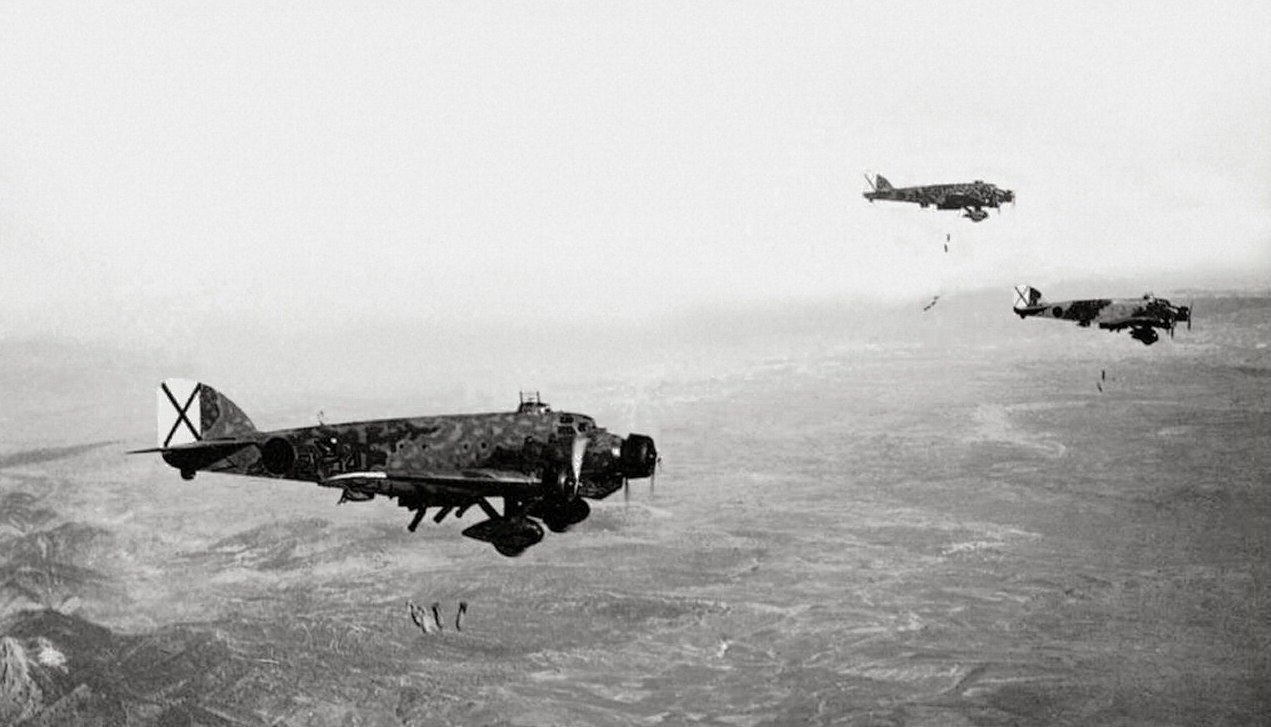
Savoia-Marchetti SM.81s on a bombing raid

Besides military targets, the Aviazione Legionaria carried out a great number of strategic bombings of cities in the Spanish Republican rear area. They were intended to terrify the civilian population into surrender. The most significant one was the 1936 bombing of Madrid, ordered by General Franco, in which the city's residential areas were subject to heavy bombardment with the exception of the upper-class Salamanca district, which was assumed to contain many Nationalist supporters. Three Italian bombers attacked the Renteria bridge on the outskirts of Guernica, prior to the Condor Legion's bombing of Guernica itself on 26 April 1937, followed by an attack on Almeria.

In 1938, Italian planes carried out most of their large-scale bombing operations by striking the cities of Barcelona, Alicante, Granollers and Valencia, as well as the railway stations of Sant Vicenç de Calders in 1938 and Xàtiva in 1939. With a total of 728 raids on Mediterranean cities, the Aviazione Legionaria had dropped 16,558 bombs and inflicted numerous casualties.

== Aftermath ==
On 12 May 1939, the last Italian aircrew embarked for Italy on the ship Duilio at Cádiz. By the end of the conflict, the Aviazione Legionaria had logged a total of 135,265 hours of flying time on 5,318 operations, dropped 11,524 tons of bombs and destroyed 943 enemy air units and 224 ships. There were 171 Italian personnel had been killed and 192 wounded, with 74 fighters, eight bombers, two ground-attack planes, and two reconnaissance aircraft shot down or destroyed.

The ratio of results to men and machines lost was positive but also confirmed the commanders of the Regia Aeronautica of their mistaken belief that biplanes and triplanes were still valid in modern combat. In fact, the age of air warfare dominated by those aircraft was waning, and it was becoming evident that radio needed to be mounted on all aircraft and that targeting had to be done with special instruments, rather than by sight. Those errors of judgement would prove decisive when Italy entered the Second World War in 1940.

== Aircraft and units ==
Twelve Fiat CR.32 biplanes arrived in Melilla aboard transport ships on 14 August 1936 (405 would be sent to Franco by the end of the operation), and by the end of August, the Cucaracha squadron was formed at Cáceres with aircraft of that type. Initial dispatches of aircraft were followed by more numerous ones. In March 1939, eleven new Fiat G.50 Freccia monoplane fighters were sent, to be based at Ascalona, but they ultimately never saw action. In addition to the aircraft, Italy provided a number of well-trained men, sending more than 6,000 in total: 5,699 airmen and 312 civilians.

Various types of bombers were sent to Franco's forces, including 55 three-engined Savoia-Marchetti SM.81s, 99 three-engined Savoia-Marchetti SM.79s, and 16 Fiat BR.20s. The units were made part of the 21st Stormo da Bombardamento Pesante and the 251st and 252nd Squadriglia Pipistrelli delle Baleari. The Cicognas went to 230th Squadriglia da bombardamento veloce in summer 1937, before being transferred to the 231st in 1938.

The unit's recognition symbols were roundels placed on both sides of the wings and on the tail-rudder. The wing symbol was a completely-black circle, later personalised with white symbols ranging from a simple cross to designs referring to the commanders of the Condor Legion and the Aviación Nacional. The tail symbol was a simple black cross on a white field, which was subsequently adopted by the Spanish Air Force.

Altogether, a total of 764 aircraft were sent:

- 376 Fiat CR.32
- 12 Fiat G.50 Freccia
- 13 Fiat BR.20
- 100 Savoia-Marchetti SM.79
- 84 Savoia-Marchetti SM.81
- 3 Savoia-Marchetti S.55
- 23 Breda Ba.65
- 6 Breda Ba.28
- 3 Macchi M.41
- 10 CANT Z.501
- 4 CANT Z.506
- 25 IMAM Ro.41
- 36 IMAM Ro.37
- 16 Caproni Ca.310
- 10 Caproni A.P.1
- 53 transport aircraft
- 20 seaplanes
- 10 troop carriers

== See also ==
- Condor Legion
- Spanish Republican Air Force

== Bibliography ==
- Heiberg, M. (2004). Emperadores del Mediterráneo: Franco, Mussolini y la Guerra Civil Española (in Spanish). Barcelona: Crítica. ISBN 8484324702.
- Pedriali, F. (1992). Guerra di Spagna e Aviazione Italiana (in Italian). Rome: Ufficio Storico dello Stato maggiore Aeronautica.
- Thomas, H. (2006). The Spanish Civil War. London, UK: Penguin Books.
