= Bombing of Alicante =

Attack by military aircraft during the Spanish Civil War

Coordinates: 38°21′N 0°29′W

The Market Bombing of Alicante 25 May 1938
- Part of the Spanish Civil War
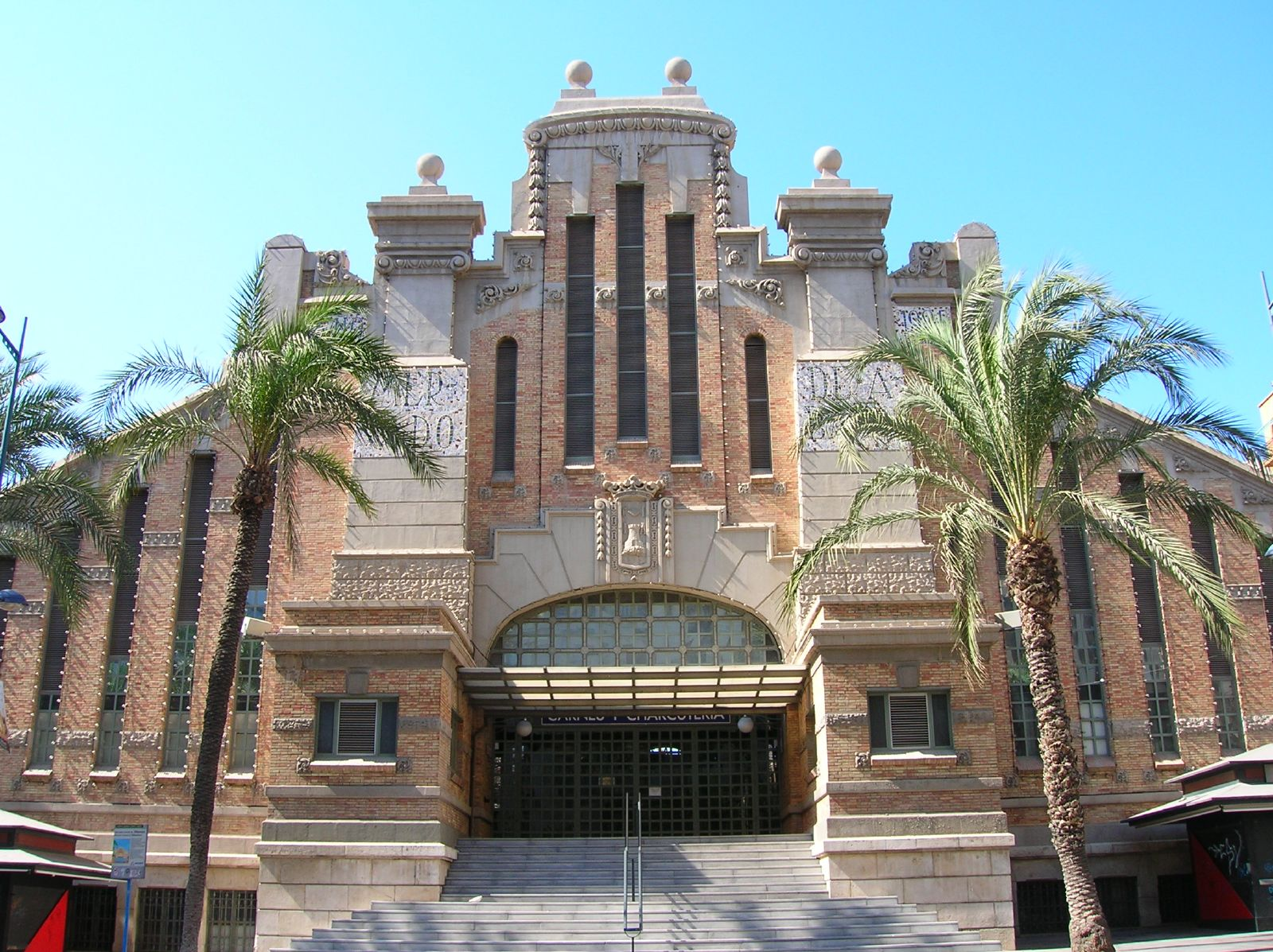
- The current central market of Alicante
Date	25 May 1938
Location	Alicante, Spain
Result	Alicante severely damaged.

Belligerents
Spanish Republic	Nationalist Spain (Kingdom of Italy) Aviazione Legionaria

Commanders and leaders
?	?

Strength
Anti-aircraft artillery	7–9 Italian Sa-79 and Sa-81 bombers

Casualties and losses
275–393 civilians dead 1,000 civilians injured	None

On 25 May 1938, the Valencian town of Alicante was aerially bombed during the Spanish Civil War. This particular attack was one of many against Alicante, perpetrated by the Legionary Air Force, an expeditionary corps from the Italian Royal Air Force, allied with Franco. The attacking planes were based in Mallorca. It is considered by historians to be one of the deadliest aerial bombings of the entire Spanish Civil War with many bombs dropped on a strictly civilian population with no military targets within a short amount of time. It was heavily reported by witnesses that the planes dove low shooting at civilians.

== Background ==
After the Aragon Offensive, Franco wanted to eliminate the Republican maritime commerce and destroy the Republican morale, so he authorized the Aviazione Legionaria and the Legion Condor to undertake indiscriminate bombings of the Republican cities. Valencia, Barcelona, Alicante, Granollers, and other Spanish town and cities were bombed.

== Bombing ==
On 25 May 1938, between seven and nine Italian SM.79 and SM.81 bombers of the Aviazione Legionaria bombed Alicante. The bombers dropped ninety bombs and many of them fell on the central market and surrounding streets of the city. There were between 275 and 393 civilian deaths (100 men, 56 women, 10 children, and more than 100 unidentified bodies), and 1000 wounded. Preston said that there were several hundreds of civilians killed.

== Aftermath ==
The bombings of Alicante and Granollers, and the attacks against British shipping provoked protests in London.
