= Sant Vicenç de Calders =

Village in Province of Tarragona, Spain

Coordinates: 41°12′14″N 1°30′53″E

- Village
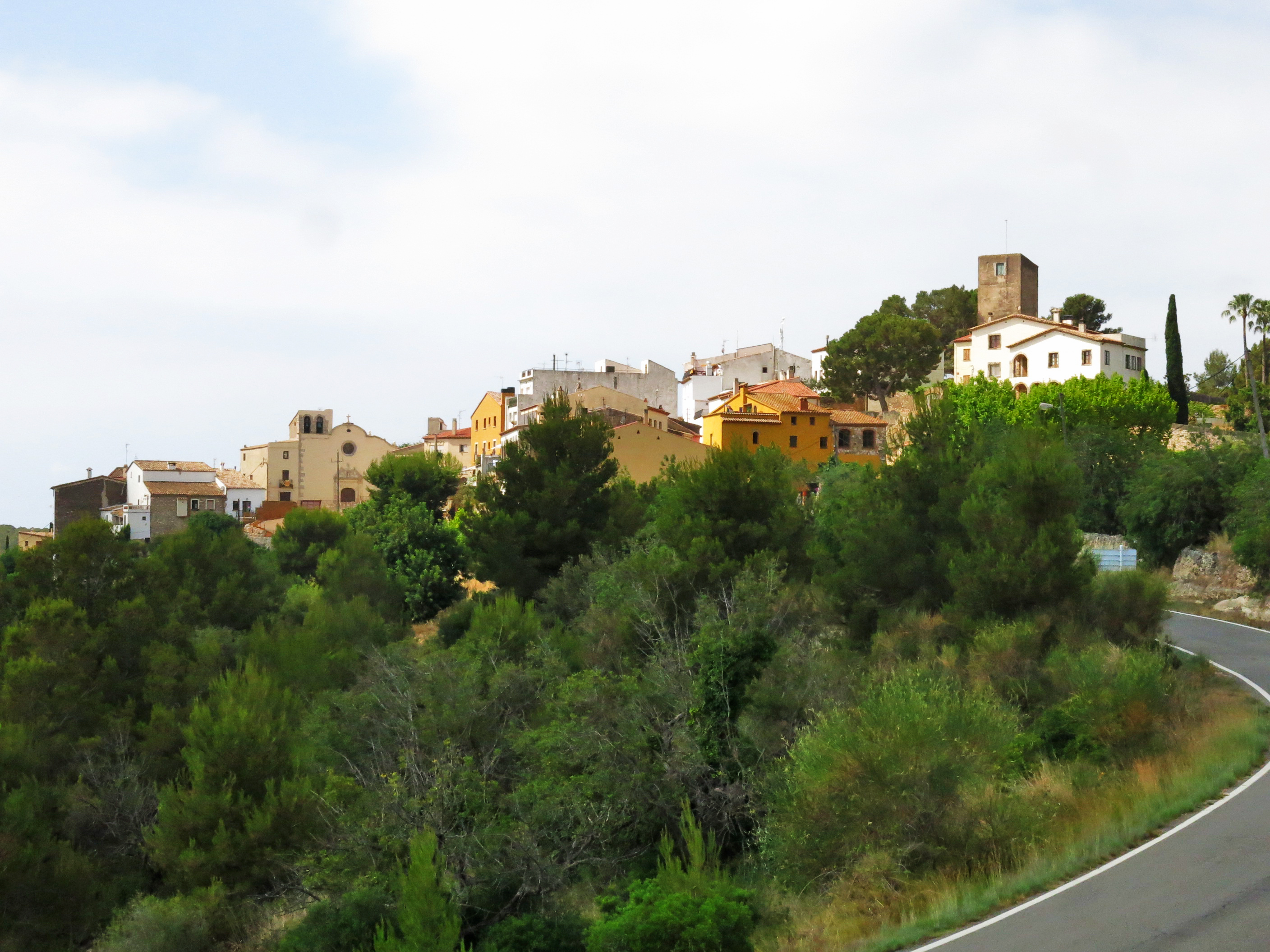
- Sant Vicenç de Calders

- Location within Spain
- Country: Spain
- Autonomous Community: Catalonia
- Province: Tarragona
- Comarca: Baix Penedès
- Municipality: El Vendrell
- Elevation: 100 m (330 ft)

Population
  - Total: 100+
- Time zone: UTC+1 (CET)

Sant Vicenç de Calders (Catalan pronunciation: [ˌsam biˈsɛnz ðə kəlˈdes]) is a village in the El Vendrell municipality, in the Baix Penedès comarca, Province of Tarragona, Spain. The village was an independent municipality until the 1940s, and is 3.4 km (2.1 mi) SE of El Vendrell. It has a population of just over one hundred.

The village is located on a 100-metre-high (330 ft) hill, with a small nucleus of 18th-century houses around the main square and near the church of St Vincent, which is documented since the 11th century and was rebuilt in the 18th century. The location of the village gives good views over Coma-ruga.

== Sant Vicenç de Calders Junction ==
In the second half of the 19th century, the railway arrived in the area, in the shape of the junction of the lines from Barcelona to Tarragona via Martorell, and Barcelona to Valls via Vilanova i la Geltrú. The two lines met 3 km (2 mi) from the village of Sant Vicenç itself, and around the station at the junction grew the barri de l'estació, a railway town.

The railway junction was repeatedly bombed by the rebel faction during the Spanish Civil War. The recurrent bombing of Sant Vicenç de Calders killed a total of 83 persons and injured over 200, mostly civilians. The deadliest attack was on 8 October 1938 causing 40 deaths.
