= Eraldo Ilari =

Italian general

- Born: 29 March 1897; Rimini, Kingdom of Italy
- Died: 1972 (age 75); Rome, Italy
- Military career
- Allegiance: Kingdom of Italy
- Branch: Royal Italian Army; Regia Aeronautica
- Rank: Air Fleet General
- Commands: PV. 2 (airship); N 2 (airship); 4th Territorial Air Zone; 4th Air Fleet; 3rd Air Fleet
- Conflicts: World War I; World War II; Greco-Italian War; Axis invasion of Yugoslavia; Allied invasion of Sicily; Allied invasion of Italy
- Awards: Military Order of Savoy; Order of Saints Maurice and Lazarus; Order of the Crown of Italy; Colonial Order of the Star of Italy; Order of the German Eagle; Cross of Military Merit

Eraldo Ilari (Rimini, 29 March 1897 – 1972) was an Italian Air Force general during World War II. He was commander of the 4th Air Fleet in Apulia and later of the 3rd Air Fleet in central Italy.

== Biography ==
Eraldo Ilari was born in Rimini on March 29, 1897, the son of Antonino Ilari. After attending the Military College of Rome, he entered the Royal Military Academy of Turin, graduating as second lieutenant in the Engineers. He took part in the First World War as an airship pilot; on 18 August 1918 he took command of the airship PV. 2, stationed on the Corneto-Tarquinia air base, tasked with escorting mail steamers sailing between mainland Italy and Sardinia. At the end of the war he was assigned to the Aeronautical Construction Plant as officer in charge of the assembling and testing of new airships. In 1921 he distinguished himself for having saved the new airship Roma, just completed and ready for delivery to the United States Army, from certain destruction after it was torn from its moorings during a violent storm. On 12 July 1921, together with commander Raffaele Senzadenari and designer Umberto Nobile, he carried out the test flight of the refurbished airship M.11 Angelo Berardi; on May 5, 1922, he carried out the test flight of the new airship O. 13, delivered to the Argentine government later that month. On 21 August 1923 he took part in one of the test flights of the former German airship LZ 120 Bodensee, renamed Esperia, which had been reconditioned at the Ciampino Outfitting Department.

Following the establishment of the Regia Aeronautica, in 1923, Ilari was transferred to the new armed force, joining the Airship Wing. He participated in the 1924, 1925, 1926 and 1927 editions of the Gordon Bennett Cup. In August 1925, in command of airship N 2, he participated in the fleet maneuvers off Augusta, involving over a hundred vessels of various types, and from 26 August he participated in the search operations for the submarine Sebastiano Veniero, which had gone missing during the maneuvers (it was later discovered that it had been rammed off Cape Passero by the steamer Capena, sinking with all hands).

Having then left airships for airplanes, he was assigned to the 2nd Territorial Air Zone and assumed command of a maritime bombing group; in the early 1930s he participated in Italo Balbo's Italy-Brazil transatlantic air cruise as commander of the support base set up in Bolama, and in the Decennial Air Cruise as commander of the support base in Newfoundland. In 1933 he was promoted to colonel and in 1934 he became Chief of Staff of General Francesco Pricolo, the new Deputy Chief of Staff of the Regia Aeronautica. Pricolo complained that Ilari, a former airshipman, had spent six years behind a desk neglecting the flying hours required to maintain his six-month pilot license, and forced him to comply. In May 1935 he was promoted to the rank of air brigadier general (air commodore).

Starting from May 16, 1939, he assumed command of the 4th Territorial Air Zone, replacing Mario Ajmone Cat; by Pricolo's order, he had to obtain a pilot license for every type of aircraft under his command. He maintained this post after Italy entered World War II on 10 June 1940. On 30 December 1940 Ilari assumed command of the 4th Air Fleet, with headquarters in Bari, supporting operations in Albania during the Greco-Italian War and later the invasion of Yugoslavia. On 26 June 1941 he left command of the 4th Air Fleet and assumed that of the 3rd Air Fleet, based in central Italy. On 1 August 1941 he was awarded the title of Commander of the Military Order of Savoy.

On 6 October 1942 he left the command of the 3rd Air Fleet and became Deputy Chief of Staff for construction and supplies at the General Staff of the Regia Aeronautica (Superaereo) in Rome. On February 7, 1943, he chaired a meeting in which the details of a planned bombing raid on New York (Operation S) were discussed; it was established that the aircraft would take off from Bordeaux and land in the Atlantic Ocean next to a submarine, which would deliver the fuel for the return flight. The plane chosen for the raid was initially the four-engine CANT Z.511 seaplane, but this was later changed in favor of the Savoia-Marchetti SM.95.

On 8 August 1943 Ilari returned to the command of the 3rd Air Fleet, headquartered in Rome, now tasked with opposing the Allied advance following the landings in Sicily and then in mainland Italy. On 6 September 1943 the Minister of the Air Force, Renato Sandalli, informed Ilari and the Deputy Chief of Staff, General Giuseppe Santoro, of the signing of the armistice of Cassibile, giving them the instructions on how to behave in view of the inevitable German reaction. After the official proclamation of the armistice on 8 September 1943, Ilari entered into negotiations with Luftwaffe General Alfred Mahncke; on 12 September, after obtaining Sandalli's consent, an agreement was reached, stating that the air bases of the 3rd Air Fleet and their equipment and fuel would be handed over intact to the Germans, in exchange for the latter's commitment not to interfere with the safe departure of all Italian aircraft based there. Ilari thus reached Allied-controlled territory in southern Italy with his air units, entering service in the Italian Co-belligerent Air Force. On the following 8 October he left the post of Deputy Chief of Staff for construction and supplies, and on 18 June 1944 that of commander of the 3rd Air Fleet, assuming command of the 4th Territorial Air Zone; he was later appointed Head of Cabinet at the Ministry of the Air Force.

After the end of the war he retired from the Air Force, becoming a director at Aeronautica Macchi in Varese. In 1960 he was one of the founding members of the Rotary Club of Rome. He died in 1972.
