= Mario Bernasconi (general) =

Italian general (1892–1976)

- Born: 7 July 1892; Cuneo, Kingdom of Italy
- Died: 11 October 1976 (aged 84); Turin, Italy
- Military career
- Allegiance: Kingdom of Italy
- Branch: Royal Italian Army; Regia Aeronautica
- Service years: 1915-1946
- Rank: Air Fleet General
- Commands: Montecelio-Guidonia Experimental Group; Reparto Speciale Alta Velocità; 3rd Fighter Wing; 15th Land Bombardment Wing; 4th Air Brigade; Mixed Air Brigade of Italian Somalia; Aviazione Legionaria; 5th Air Fleet
- Conflicts: World War I; Second Italo-Ethiopian War; Battle of Genale Doria; Spanish Civil War; Battle of Bilbao; Battle of Santander; Aragon Offensive; Battle of Teruel; Battle of the Ebro; World War II; North African campaign; Western Desert campaign; Tunisian campaign
- Awards: Silver Medal of Military Valor; Military Order of Savoy; Order of the Crown of Italy; Order of Saints Maurice and Lazarus

Mario Bernasconi (7 July 1892 – 11 October 1976) was an Italian Air Force general during World War II. He commanded the Reparto Speciale Alta Velocità (High-Speed Special Unit, which he founded along with Italo Balbo) during the interwar period, the Aviazione Legionaria during the Spanish Civil War, and the 5th Air Fleet in North Africa during World War II.

== Biography ==
He was born in Cuneo on 7 July 1892, and after attending the "Germain Sommeiller" technical institute in Turin, in 1913 he entered the Royal Academy of Artillery and Engineers of Turin, where he ranked among the best cadets of his course. In 1915 he graduated from the School of Artillery and Engineers with the rank of second lieutenant, assigned to the Corps of Miners Engineers of the Royal Italian Army. With the entry of the Kingdom of Italy into the World War I, on 24 May of the same year, he was immediately sent to the front. On 1 February 1916, he was promoted to the rank of lieutenant, and being attracted to the world of aviation, he asked to be assigned to the Army Air Service to become a pilot. On 27 April he was sent to the Airmen Battalion, where he obtained his pilot license on 1 July, flying on Maurice Farman MF.14 aircraft. He distinguished himself as a military pilot, to the point that on 1 June 1917 he was assigned as instructor to the Busto Arsizio Flight School. Having been promoted to captain, on 1 January 1918 he was transferred to the airfield of Foiano della Chiana as chief instructor.

After the end of the war, on 1 January 1919, he assumed the position of technical director of the Experimental Services of Aeronautical Communications. In April he was transferred to the Military Aviation Technical Directorate of Turin, as head of the Engine and Flight Testing Office of SPAD fighter planes; in the same year he was sent on a mission to China. In February 1921 he participated in the higher course of the Artillery and Engineer Application School. Following the establishment of the Regia Aeronautica on March 28, 1923, he was transferred to the new armed force at his request. In 1924 he was sent on a mission to France, where he was able to fly several types of aircraft used by the Armée de l'Air. After returning to Italy he was assigned to the Capua Flight School as a teacher of the theory of propellers. Also during 1924, he was sent to Romania, as an aeronautical consultant for the material sold by Italy to the local air force.

In 1925 he was promoted to the rank of major, and after a short period spent at the General Staff, he was tasked with carrying out the flight tests of the new Fiat CR.1 fighter at the Turin aeronautical engineering department. On December 30 of the same year, he graduated in civil engineering from the Royal Engineering School of Turin. In 1927 he assumed command of the Montecelio-Guidonia Experimental Group, and on 27 July of the same year he was promoted to lieutenant colonel, assuming command of the newly established Reparto Speciale Alta Velocità (High Speed Special Unit) of Desenzano del Garda on 1 February 1928. This unit had the task of preparing pilots and airplanes in view of the Italian participation in the Schneider Trophy for racing seaplanes. In September 1929 he was promoted to colonel for special merits, and obtained the high-speed pilot's license, exceeding 500 km/h.

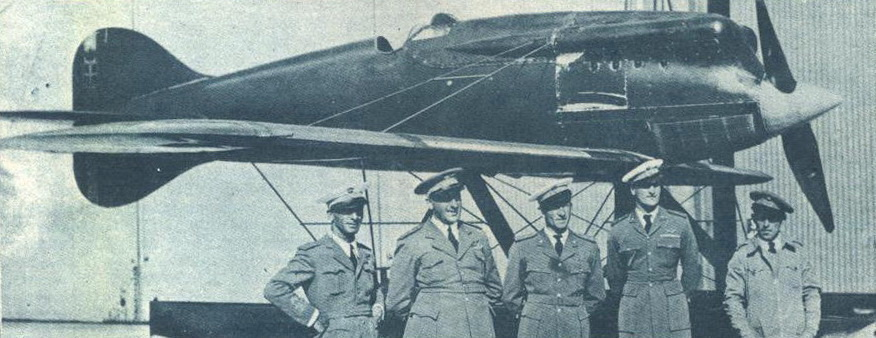
The Italian team for the Schneider Trophy of 1929 with their Macchi M.39 seaplane. Bernasconi is second from left.

He left office on November 1, 1933, first taking command of the 3rd Fighter Wing, and then the 15th Land Bombardment Wing. After promotion to air brigade general (equivalent to air commodore), he obtained command of the 4th Air Brigade. During 1935 he was sent to Somalia, where on 24 November he assumed command of the Mixed Air Brigade of Italian Somalia in view of the war against Ethiopia. For his contribution in the victory at Genale Doria (in which his aircraft dropped both normal ordnance and poison gas bombs on Ethiopian troops), he was awarded a Silver Medal of Military Valor. On 30 December 1935, Bernasconi personally led a bombing raid on a Swedish Red Cross hospital treating Ethiopian wounded, in reprisal for the execution of downed Italian pilot Tito Minniti by Ethiopian troops, on the orders of General Rodolfo Graziani. On February 4, 1936, he was replaced by General Ferruccio Ranza and returned to Italy, where in June he was promoted to the rank of air division general (equivalent to air vice marshal).

On 12 May 1937 he left for Spain to take command of the Aviazione Legionaria, supporting the Francoist forces during the Spanish Civil War, replacing General Vincenzo Velardi. Commanding a force of over two hundred bombers and fighters, he provided decisive air support to the Nationalists during the battles of Bilbao, of Santander, of Aragon, of Teruel and of the Ebro. He however came into conflict with Ettore Muti, who accused him of suffering from a "inferiority complex" towards Hugo Sperrle (commander of the Condor Legion), and with General Gastone Gambara, commander of the Corpo Truppe Volontarie (who wanted more control over the Aviazione Legionaria); as a result, he had to leave his post in November 1938, being replaced by General Giuseppe Maceratini. Nonetheless, after the end of the Spanish Civil War Bernasconi was promoted to the rank of air fleet general (equivalent to air marshal), and awarded the title of Commander of the Military Order of Savoy.

After the Kingdom of Italy entered World War II on 10 June 1940, he held various positions (such as that of Inspector-General of the Air Force and later, from March to September 1942, that of Deputy Chief of the Air Staff for Armament; he participated in the planning of the flight of a Savoia-Marchetti SM.75 flown by Colonel Antonio Moscatelli from Rome to Tokyo in June 1942, the only successful flight by an Axis aircraft between Europe and Japan during the war) until 1 October 1942, when he assumed command of the 5th Air Fleet operating in Italian North Africa, which he kept until March 15, 1943, when the 5th Air Fleet was dissolved in Tunis and he was repatriated (General Mario Boschi was put in command of the remaining Italian air units in Tunisia).

After the end of the war, he retired from active service at his request on October 15, 1946. After leaving military life, he devoted himself to teaching aeronautical disciplines at the Polytechnic of Turin, where died on 11 October 1976.
