= Spanish North Africa =

Spanish North Africa may refer to:

- Contemporary Spanish North Africa:
  - Spain's two autonomous cities: Ceuta and Melilla, plus other minor territories (plazas de soberanía)
  - Canary Islands
- Historical Spanish North Africa (1913–1975); former Spanish colonies in Northern Africa, part of the Plazas y Provincias Africanas:
  - Spanish Morocco
  - Spanish Sahara
  - Ifni
  - Cape Juby

== See also ==
- Spanish Africa (disambiguation)
- Spanish West Africa
- Ceuta and Melilla (disambiguation)
- Languages of Africa
