= Bombing of Sant Vicenç de Calders =

- Part of the Spanish Civil War
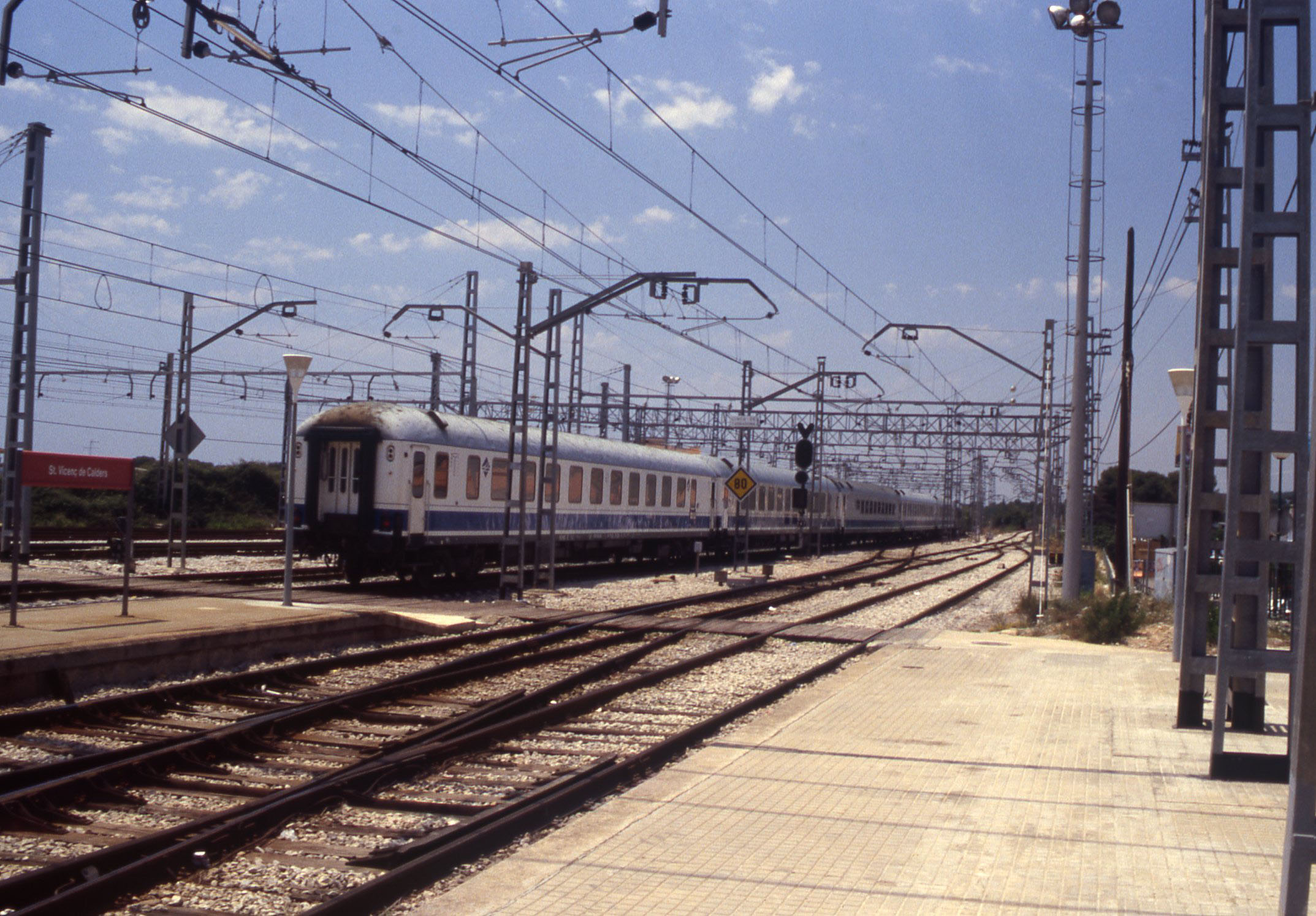
- Present-day Sant Vicenç de Calders junction
Date	8 October 1938
Location	Sant Vicenç de Calders, Catalonia

Belligerents
Nationalist Spain; Kingdom of Italy	Spanish Republic

Units involved
Aviazione Legionaria	

Strength
One bomber	

Casualties and losses
None	40–60 killed; 100+ injured

The bombing of Sant Vicenç de Calders was an aerial bombing of the railway station of Sant Vicenç de Calders, Catalonia, during the Spanish Civil War. It was carried out on 8 October 1938 at the behest of Francisco Franco's nationalist regime by the Aviazione Legionaria of its fascist Italian allies.

== Background ==
Sant Vicenç de Calders railway station is located at the important junction of the lines from the Sant Vicenç de Calders–L'Hospitalet railway, and Madrid–Barcelona railways. The two lines meet three kilometres (2 mi) from the village of Sant Vicenç itself, and around the station at the junction there is the barri de l'estació, a railway town.

The railway junction was repeatedly bombed by the rebel faction during the Spanish Civil War, particularly by the Aviazione Legionaria based in Palma de Mallorca – and occasionally by the Condor Legion. The recurrent bombing of Sant Vicenç de Calders junction during the war killed a total of 83 persons and injured over 200, mostly civilians. Damaged railway lines were subsequently repaired.

== Bombing ==
The bombing of 8 October 1938 was one of the war's deadliest, causing 40 to 60 deaths and over 100 wounded, including numerous victims who were trampled in a subsequent stampede.

The attack was carried out by a single bomber that came in from over the Mediterranean, and hit a civilian passenger train that had just entered the junction on its way from Tarragona to Barcelona. Six passenger wagons were destroyed. After it hit its target, the aircraft circled around and made a strafing run.

== See also ==
- Aviazione Legionaria bombing operations
- Aviazione Legionaria
