= Gennaro Tedeschini Lalli =

Italian Air Force general (1889–1948)

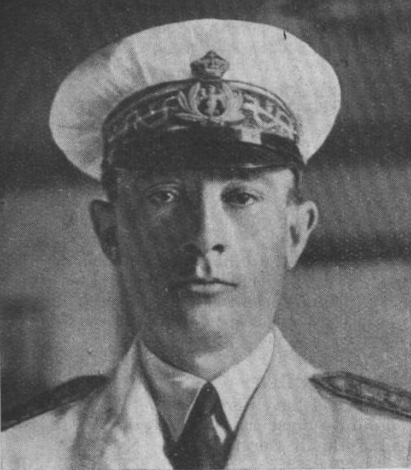
- Born: 22 November 1889; Ficulle, Kingdom of Italy
- Died: 15 March 1948 (aged 58); Rome, Italy
- Military career
- Allegiance: Kingdom of Italy
- Branch: Royal Italian Army; Regia Aeronautica
- Rank: Air Fleet General
- Commands: 1st Wing; 1st Territorial Air Zone; 2nd Territorial Air Zone; Italian East Africa Air Force Command; 2nd Air Fleet; 1st Air Fleet
- Conflicts: Italo-Turkish War; World War I; Second Italo-Ethiopian War; World War II; North African campaign; Axis invasion of Yugoslavia
- Awards: Silver Medal of Military Valor (twice); Bronze Medal of Military Valor; Military Order of Savoy; Order of Saints Maurice and Lazarus; Order of the Crown of Italy

Gennaro Tedeschini Lalli (Ficulle, 22 November 1889 – Rome, 15 March 1948) was an Italian Air Force general during World War II. He was in command of the Air Force in Italian East Africa from 1937 to 1939, in Sicily in 1940, and in Northern Italy from 1941 to 1943.

== Biography ==
He was born in Ficulle, province of Terni, on 22 November 1889, the son of Domenico Tedeschini Lalli. After enlisting in the Royal Italian Army, he participated as an infantry lieutenant in the Italo-Turkish War, fighting in Libya, where he earned a Bronze Medal of Military Valor. During the First World War he initially fought as an infantry officer and later joined the Army Air Service, being assigned to airships. During the war he was awarded two silver medals for military valor. In 1923 he joined the newly established Regia Aeronautica.

In June 1926 he was awarded the honor of Knight of the Order of the Crown of Italy. In the first half of the 1930s he was in command of the 1st Wing, then of the 1st Territorial Air Zone (ZAT) of Milan, and later of the 2nd Territorial Air Zone of Padua; in the same period he also served as Head of Cabinet to Air Force Minister Italo Balbo. On 10 May 1937 he was appointed commander of the Italian East Africa Air Force Command, replacing General Renato Mazzucco. He directed the air support to counterguerrilla operations in Ethiopia until 1 December 1939, when he was replaced by General Pietro Pinna Parpaglia. After returning to Italy, he assumed command of the 2nd Air Fleet in Sicily, with headquarters in Palermo.

When Italy entered World War II on 10 June 1940, the 2nd Air Fleet immediately began war operations against targets located in Malta, Algeria and Tunisia. On 23 December 1940 the 2nd Air Fleet was transferred to Padua in anticipation of the planned invasion of Yugoslavia, which it would support in collaboration with the 4th Air Fleet and the Air Force of Albania. Tedeschini Lalli left this command on 15 June 1941 to take over that of the 1st Air Fleet (stationed in Northern Italy), which he held until 1 October 1942. After leaving this position he was again appointed commander of the 1st Territorial Air Zone (Z.A.T.) of Milan.

In the first months of 1943 he expressed his doubts about the morale of the cadres of the Regia Aeronautica, with the exception of young pilots, to the Chief of Staff of the Royal Air Force, General Rino Corso Fougier. He became president of the Superior Committee of the Air Force on 1 July 1943, on the eve of the Allied invasion of Sicily and the fall of the Fascist regime, and in the same period he wrote a report in which he denounced the state of the air force, highlighting the shortcomings in training and command.

After the Armistice of Cassibile he remained in Allied-controlled territory, and in November 1943 he was appointed president and Delegate of the Administration of the Italian Company for Civil Aviation, the former Ala Littoria. He died in Rome on 15 March 1948.
