= Giuseppe Santoro (general) =

Italian Air Force general

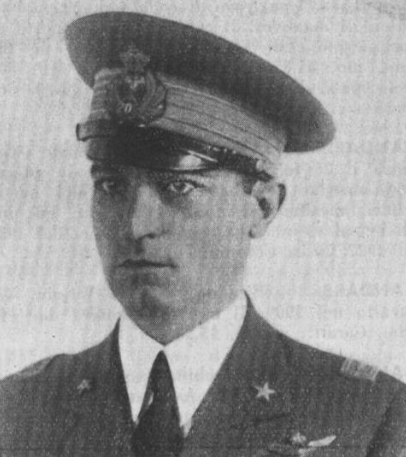
- Born: 19 November 1894; Naples, Kingdom of Italy
- Died: 2 June 1975 (aged 80); Naples, Italy
- Military career
- Allegiance: Kingdom of Italy; Italy
- Branch: Regia Aeronautica; Italian Air Force
- Rank: General
- Commands: 20th Wing; 1st Fighter Division "Aquila"; 6th Air Brigade; Air Academy
- Conflicts: World War I; Second Italo-Ethiopian War; World War II
- Awards: Silver Medal of Military Valour (twice); Military Order of Savoy

Giuseppe Santoro (9 November 1894, in Naples – 2 June 1975) was a general in the Italian Air Force, Deputy Chief of Staff of the Regia Aeronautica during World War II. After the war, he was the author of the official history of the Italian Air Force during the Second World War.

== Biography ==
Santoro was born in the San Ferdinando district of Naples on 9 November 1894, and after enlisting in the Royal Italian Army he participated in the First World War as a lieutenant in the 12th Field Artillery Regiment and later as a navigator in the Air Service of the Royal Italian Army. On 25 August 1917, he was assigned to the 26th Air Squadron, on 25 October in the 32nd Squadron and at the end of the war he was in service in the 2nd SVA Section. During his wartime service, he earned two Silver Medals for Military Valor and was wounded during a flight mission. In the early 1920s, with the creation of the Regia Aeronautica, Santoro joined the new armed force, and in 1932 he was commander of the 20th Wing. A renowned theorist, he taught in various war schools, holding between 1934 and 1936 the position of teacher of air employment and logistics at the Aerial Warfare School of Florence. He was also editor of the magazine Le Vie dell'Aria, along with Gino D'Angelo.

He participated in the Second Italo-Ethiopian War. In February 1936, he was promoted to Air Brigade General (equivalent to air commodore) and later to Air Division General (equivalent to air vice marshal), and was given command of the 1st Fighter Division "Aquila". He left command of this unit on 6 July 1939, replaced by General Vincenzo Velardi.

On 1 November 1939, Santoro became Deputy Chief of Staff of the Regia Aeronautica, a post he held until the Armistice of Cassibile, serving successively under Francesco Pricolo, Rino Corso Fougier and Renato Sandalli. In June 1940, shortly before Italy entered World War II, he was promoted to Air Fleet General (equivalent to air marshal).

On 1 March 1942 he participated in a meeting that took place at the General Staff of the Regia Aeronautica, which was also attended by Generals Vincenzo Velardi, Umberto Cappa and Simon Pietro Mattei, and by Colonel Mario Porru-Locci, in which Lieutenant Colonel Amedeo Paradisi was chosen as pilot of the Savoia-Marchetti SM. 75 that would fly from Italy to Japan and back.

On 6 September 1943, Santoro, along with General Eraldo Ilari (commander of the 3rd Air Fleet, with headquarters in Rome), was informed by Air Force Minister Renato Sandalli of the signing of the Armistice of Cassibile, and received instructions on how to behave. After the proclamation of the armistice on 8 September 1943, while Sandalli fled to Brindisi along with King Victor Emmanuel III and the government, Santoro remained in Rome; on 11 September he ordered all aircraft able to take off to fly to airfields in southern Italy and Sardinia. After the German occupation of Rome, he evaded capture; he remained loyal to the Badoglio Government and later commanded the 6th Air Brigade and the Air Academy.

He left active service in 1949, and in 1957 he published the official history of the Italian Air Force in World War II (L'Aeronautica italiana nella seconda guerra mondiale), in which he denounced the shortcomings and mistakes made by the military and industrial leadership in the years preceding the outbreak of the war.

He died in Naples on 2 June 1975.
