= Bombing of Barcelona =

1938 bombing during the Spanish Civil War

Coordinates: 41.3870°N 2.1700°E

- Part of the Spanish Civil War
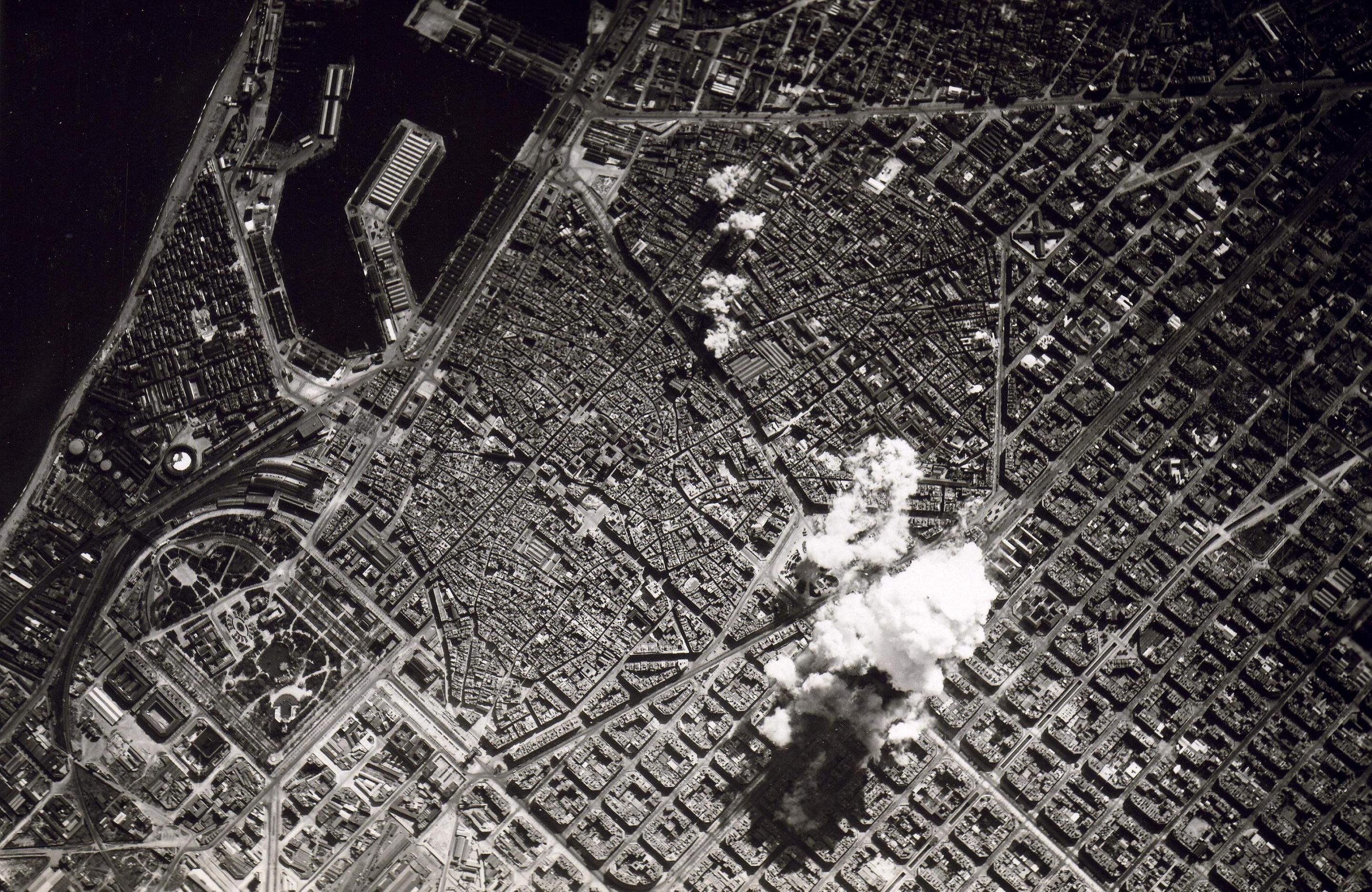
- Aerial photo of bombs exploding in Barcelona
Date	16–18 March 1938
Location	Barcelona, Catalonia, Spain
Result	Barcelona severely damaged

Belligerents
Spanish Republic: Generalitat of Catalonia	Nationalist Spain; Italy; Germany

Commanders and leaders
(Second Spanish Republic) Andrés García Calle	(Kingdom of Italy) Vincenzo Velardi

Strength
Anti-aircraft artillery	Unknown number of He-51 fighters Unknown number of Sa-79 and Sa-81 Italian bombers

Casualties and losses
1,000–1,300 civilians dead 2,000 civilians wounded	None

The bombing of Barcelona was a series of airstrikes led by Fascist Italy and Nazi Germany supporting the Franco-led Nationalist rebel army, which took place from 16 to 18 March 1938, during the Spanish Civil War. Up to 1,300 people were killed and at least 2,000 were wounded.

== Background ==
In March 1938, the Nationalists started an offensive in Aragon, after the Battle of Teruel. On 15 March, the French government, led by Léon Blum, decided to reopen the Spanish frontier, and Soviet supplies began to pass to Barcelona. Fascist Italian dictator Benito Mussolini, without informing Francisco Franco beforehand, decided to carry out massive air bombing raids against Barcelona in the belief that it would "weaken the morale of the Reds". Mussolini, like the Italian general Giulio Douhet, believed that aircraft could win a war through strategic bombing (also called terror bombing), and personally ordered the Aviazione Legionaria to conduct a "continuous bombing of Barcelona diluted in time".

== The bombing ==
Between 16 and 18 March 1938, Barcelona was bombed by the Italian Aviazione Legionaria, the branch of the Royal Italian Air Force fighting in the Spanish Civil War These bombers flew from Mallorca with Spanish markings. The first raid came at 22:00 on 16 March by German Heinkel He 51 fighters. After that, there were seventeen air raids by Italian Savoia-Marchetti SM.79 and Savoia-Marchetti SM.81 bombers at three hour intervals until 15:00 on 18 March. On the night of 18 March, the working-class districts were badly hit. The Spanish Republican Air Force (FARE) did not send fighters to Barcelona until the morning of 17 March.

Barcelona had little anti-aircraft artillery and no aerial cover, making it practically defenseless. The bombers silently glided over the city at high altitudes and only restarted their engines after releasing their bombs, meaning the alert could not be sounded and the bombers could not be detected until after the bombs had exploded on target. The Italians had used delayed-fuse bombs designed to pass through roofs and then explode inside the building, as well as a new type of bomb which exploded with a strong lateral force, so as to destroy things within a few inches of the ground. The repeated wave of attacks carried out by the Italians rendered the city's air raid alarms irrelevant, since it would no longer be clear if the sirens were announcing the beginning or the end of an attack.

The Italian bombers dropped 44 tons of bombs. Rather than aiming at military targets, the Italians intended to destroy industrial areas of the city and demoralize the Republican side, in what some authors have described as the first aerial carpet bombing in history. Their targets and declared objectives were military warehouses, arms factories, trains with soldiers, and the port, but civil buildings, cinemas, consulates, and theatres were also hit or destroyed during the bombing.

== Aftermath ==
The attack was condemned by Western democracies all around the world. U.S. Secretary of State Cordell Hull said: "No theory of war can justify such conduct. ... I feel that I am speaking for the whole American people!" Franco was not initially informed of the attacks and was displeased; on 19 March, he asked for the suspension of the bombings, for fear of "complications abroad". Mussolini, on the other hand, was very pleased with the bombings. Italian Foreign Minister and Mussolini's son-in-law Galeazzo Ciano said that: "He was pleased by the fact that the Italians have managed to provoke horror, by their aggression instead of complacency with their mandolins. This will send up our stock in Germany, where they love total and ruthless war."

Later in the year, the British journalist John Langdon-Davies, who had been present in Barcelona at the time, published an account of the attacks. He reported that the bombers had glided in at high altitude to avoid being detected by the acoustic aircraft detectors, and only restarted their engines after releasing their bomb loads, which he termed the "silent approach" method. The effect of this was that the aircraft were not detected and the alert sounded until after their bombs had exploded on target. Along with the variance of the times between each individual attack, this had a demoralizing effect on the civilian population, which suffered prolonged anxiety quite out of proportion to the number of bombs dropped over a long period of time. Coupled with the fact that there was little discernible military value in the choice of targets within the city, and the cessation of the attacks for no apparent reason, Langdon-Davies determined that the raids constituted a deliberate experiment in the use of such tactics in preparation for their application in any subsequent conflict by the Germans and Italians against the United Kingdom.

== In Literature ==
- Carlos Ruiz Zafón begins his novel The Labyrinth of Spirits with a story about the fire bombing of Barcelona in March of 1938.

== See also ==
- Aviazione Legionaria
- Condor Legion
