= Guido Fibbia =

Italian Second World War fighter pilot

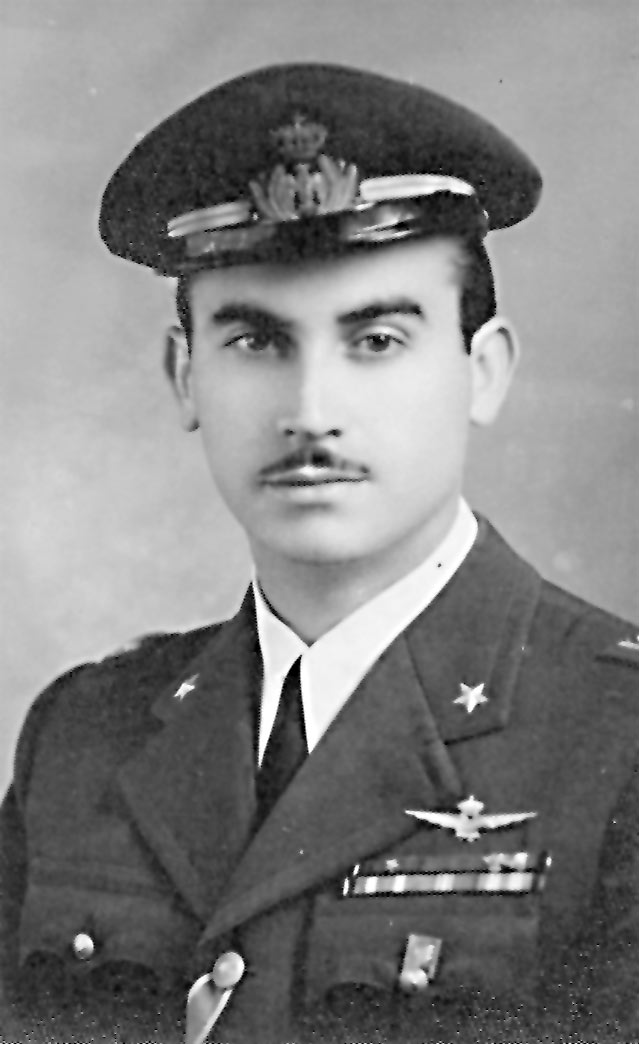
Maresciallo pilota Guido Fibbia-1941

Guido Fibbia (1 October 1917 – 1 July 1988) was an Italian Second World War fighter pilot in the Regia Aeronautica and in the Aeronautica Nazionale Repubblicana. He was credited with 9 enemy planes shot down flying with biplanes Fiat C.R.32, Fiat C.R.42 and monoplanes Macchi C.200, C.202, C.205, Fiat G.50, G.55 and the German Messerschmitt Bf 109. He was decorated with two Silver Medal of Military Valor (Medaglia d'Argento al Valor Militare), one Bronze Medal of Military Valor (Medaglia di Bronzo al Valor Militare), one Croce di Guerra and one German Iron Cross 2nd Class.

== Early life ==
Guido Fibbia was born in Treviso on 1 October 1917. During his youth he cultivated his passion for flying making models of gliders with his brothers. When he was 17, he joined the Regia Aeronautica (Royal Air Force) and became Pilota militare (military pilot) of the Fiat C.R.20 on 31 January 1936 in Aviano. Between June and July 1936, in Mirafiori (Turin), he got the qualification for Fiat C.R.32 (367^ Squadriglia) and Fiat C.R.42 (368^Squadriglia). On 17 September 1937, as a volunteer, he embarked on the ship "Domine" bound for Spain to fight the Spanish Civil War.

== Spain ==
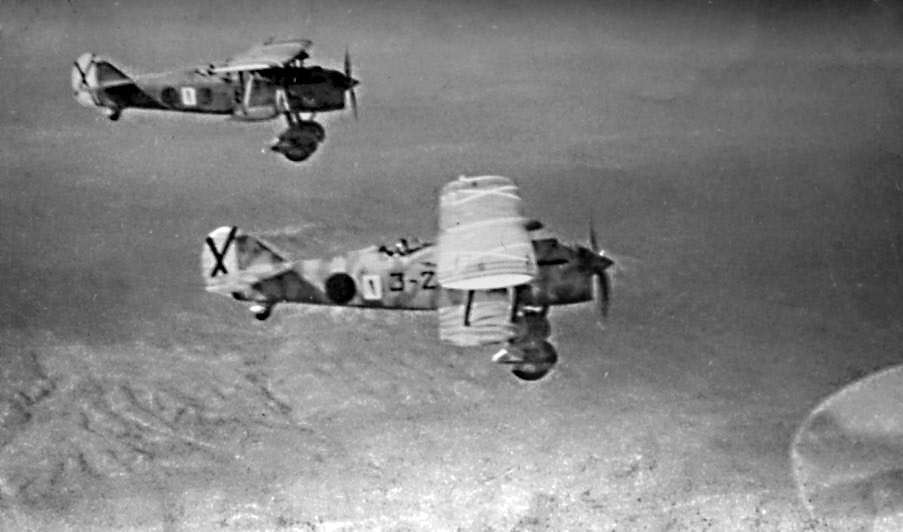
Fiat C.R.32 of Aviazione Legionaria (Legionary Air Force)

When he arrived in Tablada (Seville), he was assigned to a newly formed squadron, the 33^ Squadriglia Autonoma Caccia bombardamento, equipped with Fiat C.R.32, flying over the Cordova front. During this war he was credited with 3 aerial victories in 87 combat missions which earned him one Silver Medal of Military Valor (Medaglia d'Argento al Valor Militare) and one Bronze Medal of Military Valor (Medaglia di Bronzo al Valor Militare). After almost ten months of campaigning, on 16 July 1938, he left Spain. When he arrived in Italy, he was assigned to 365^ Squadriglia of 53°Stormo.

== 2nd World War ==
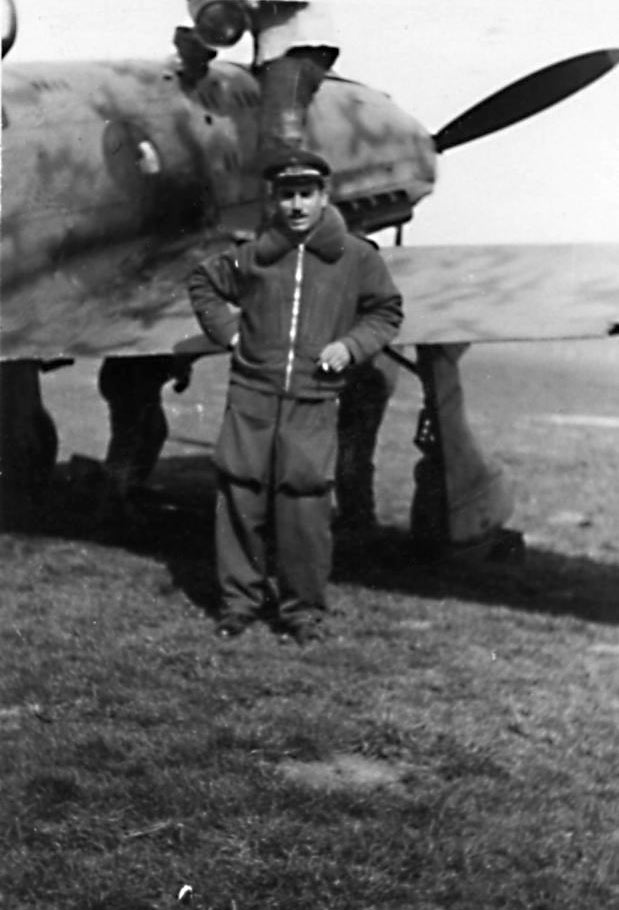
Macchi C.202

When the war against France and Great Britain started, he performed his first missions from Caselle Torinese (Turin) and Albenga. In September 1940 he moved to 95^ Squadriglia 18° Gruppo 3° Stormo, and in October he flew with Corpo Aereo Italiano during the Battle of Britain. He operated escort missions from Ursel base (Belgium) engaging in several dogfights with British Supermarine Spitfires. On 11 November 1940 he crashlanded in the vicinity of Cassel (France).

== North Africa and Greece ==
In January 1941 he was sent to Libya and on 14 April, during an escort mission on Junkers Ju 87 over Tobruk, he shot down a British Hurricane and damaged another. Between August and September 1941 he got the qualification for monoplanes Fiat G.50 and Macchi C.200. During winter 1941–42 he escorted convoys between Italy and Greece and in summer 1942, with 85^ Squadriglia 18° Gruppo, he went to Libya again to perform escort missions and as well as bombing missions of armored vehicles. During the final months of 1942 and the first six months of 1943, he was trained to fly Macchi C.202. In June 1943 he flew as a ferry pilot to transfer captured Dewoitine D.520 fighters from France to Italy, for Italian home defence. At the beginning of summer 1943, he was given one of the three new Macchi C.205 "Veltro" assigned to "3°Stormo" (the other two were allotted to the aces Franco Bordoni and Luigi Gorrini).

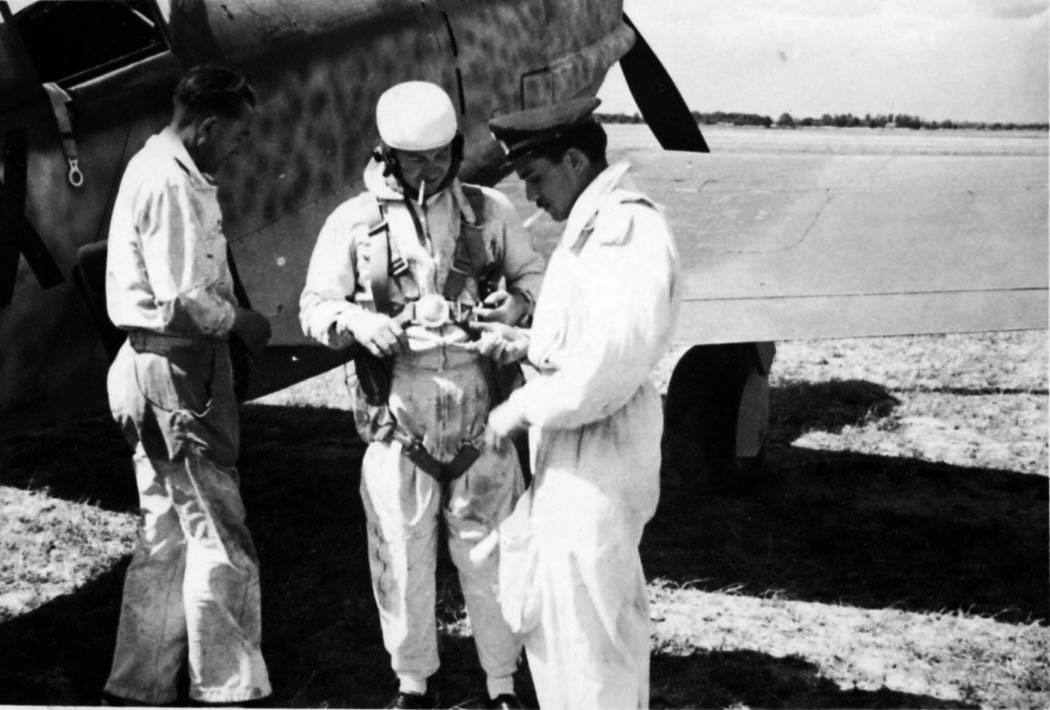
Guido Fibbia (first on the right) and the French Dewoitine D.520 fighter

== Defence of Rome ==
At the end of August 1943, the Allied forces carried out massive air strikes over Rome with four-engine Boeing B-17 bombers ("Flying Fortresses"), escorted by Lockheed P-38 fighters. On 28 and 29 August he shot down two P-38s. On 30 August, still flying with a Macchi C.205, he shot down a B-17 Flying Fortress (his war flight-log reports how many rounds of ammunition were used: 580 rounds of 12.7mm and 390 rounds of 20mm ammunition).

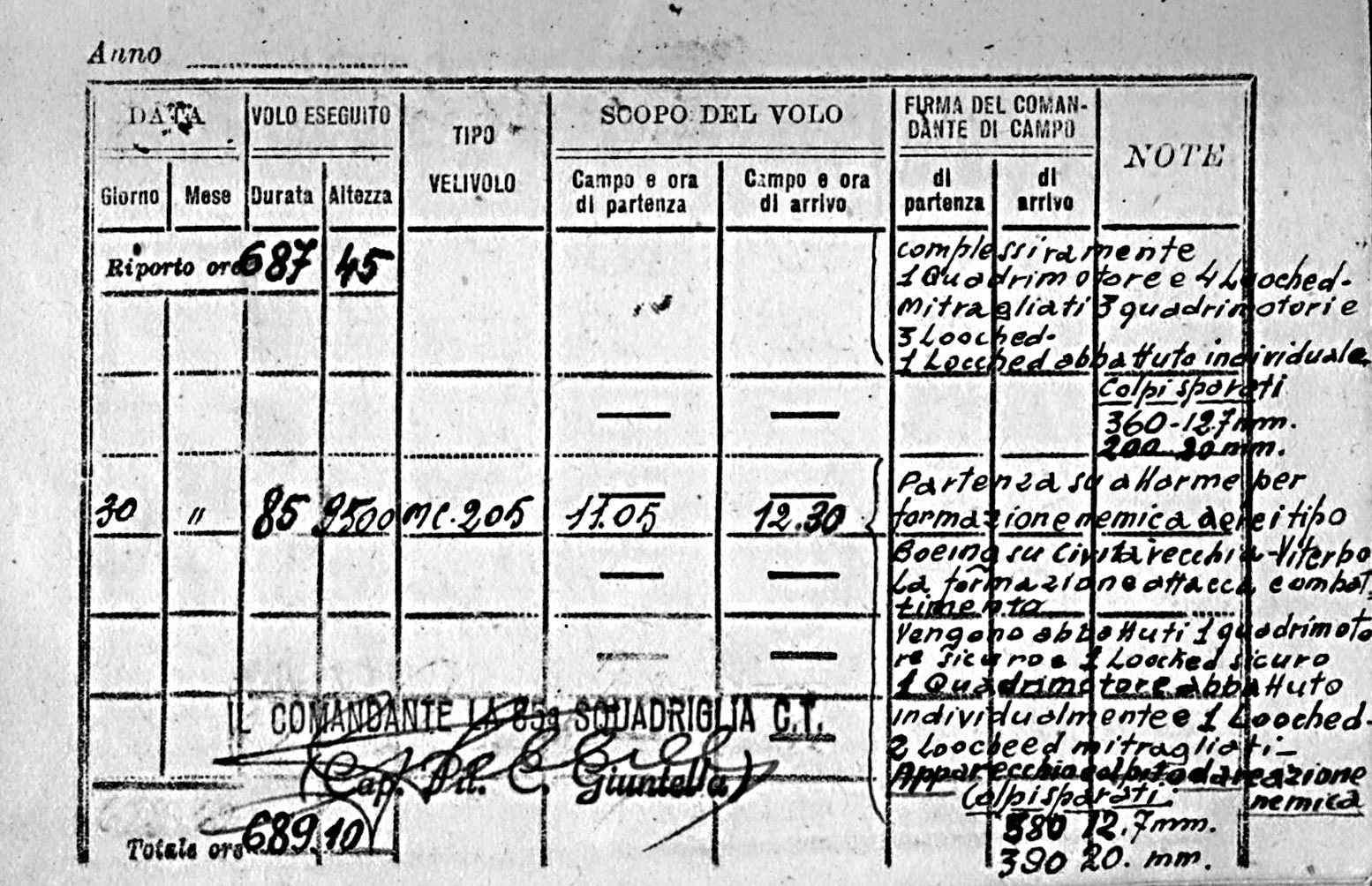
Flight log-30 August 1943

== Aeronautica Nazionale Repubblicana ==
After the Cassibile armistice, in December 1943, he joined the Aeronautica Nazionale Repubblicana, where he was assigned to Squadriglia complementare d'allarme "Montefusco-Bonet" flying from Venaria Reale airfield in defence of the cities of northern Italy from the attacks of the Allied forces. On 2 April 1944 he got the qualification on Fiat G.55, and on 12 May he fought against a B-17 formation. During the first days of June the Squadriglia was moved to Reggio Emilia and incorporated in the 1°Gruppo caccia "Asso di bastoni". On 22 June, 1st and 2nd Gruppo, in the area between Bologna and Ferrara, attacked together 400 Consolidated B-24 Liberator escorted by 60 P-38 Lightning, which had as their target the station of Parma. Flying with a Macchi C.205, he shot down one P-38 flown by Lieutenant Tolmie of the 97th Fighter Squadron (he bailed out and was taken prisoner) and damaged two, firing 400 rounds of 20mm ammunition. On 26 July, he took off again, flying a Fiat G.55, to intercept an Allied bombers formation escorted by P-47 Thunderbolt over the area of Mantua-Verona. He engaged a low-altitude dogfight against 5 Thunderbolts, shooting down one. This is the last aerial victory obtained by Maresciallo Fibbia. At the end of November, in Holzkirchen airport (Germany), he was trained on German Messerschmitt Bf 109-G10, with which he flew his last war missions.

The last sortie was reported on 17 April 1945.

== Awards ==
- Two Silver Medal of Military Valor (Medaglia d'Argento al V.M.)
- Bronze Medal of Military Valor (Medaglia di Bronzo al V.M.)
- War Merit Cross
- German Iron Cross, 2nd class
