= Macchi C.205 Veltro =

Italian WWII fighter aircraft

C.205 Veltro / C.205N Orione
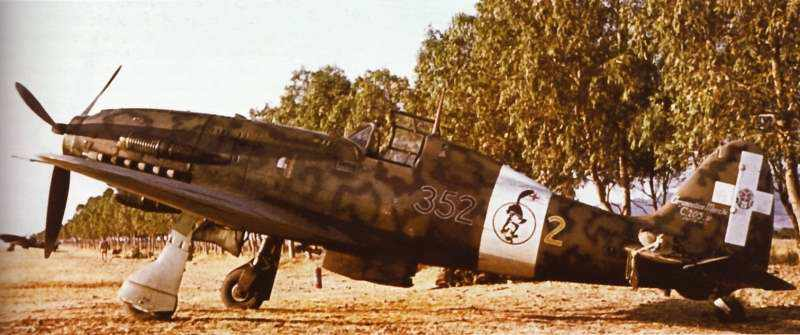
- Regia Aeronautica C.205V, Serie I from 352ª Squadriglia, 51° Stormo, photographed at Capoterra, Sardinia, summer 1943

General information
- Type: Fighter
- Manufacturer: Aeronautica Macchi
- Designer: Mario Castoldi
- Primary users: Regia Aeronautica Aeronautica Nazionale Repubblicana; Luftwaffe
- Number built: 262

History
- Manufactured: September 1942 – May 1944
- Introduction date: February 1943
- First flight: 19 April 1942
- Retired: 1947 (Italy); 1950 (Egypt)
- Developed from: Macchi C.202

The Macchi C.205 Veltro (Italian: Greyhound) (also known as MC.205) was a Second World War-era fighter aircraft designed and produced by the Italian aircraft manufacturer Aeronautica Macchi. Along with the Reggiane Re.2005 Sagittario and Fiat G.55 Centauro, the Macchi C.205 was one of the three "Serie 5" Italian fighters built around the powerful German-sourced Daimler-Benz DB 605 engine.

The C.205 was a development of the earlier C.202 Folgore, work on which commenced in 1941. On 19 April 1942, the C.205V Veltro performed its maiden flight. During testing, the type proved that it could achieve a maximum speed of roughly 640 km/h (400 mph). Due to a combination of design choices, including the DB 605 engine and a relatively high wing loading, it was capable of achieving comparable performance to contemporary frontline German fighter aircraft. Production aircraft were typically armed with a pair of 20 mm Mauser MG 151/20 cannon along with 12.7 mm Breda-SAFAT machine guns; the type could also be equipped with underwing bomb racks when conducting ground-attack missions.

Entering squadron service with the Regia Aeronautica during February 1943, the C.205 soon garnered a strong reputation amongst both Allied and Axis pilots; it has been widely regarded as one of the best Italian aircraft of the Second World War. The C.205 proved to be extremely effective in aerial combat, being responsible for the destruction of a large number of Allied bombers. The C. 205 proved capable of engaging fighters such as the North American P-51D Mustang on equal terms; this performance reportedly encouraged the Luftwaffe to use a number of these aircraft to equip one Gruppe. The C.205 was allegedly capable of matching even the best Allied opponents in terms of both speed and maneuverability. Italy's highest-scoring ace, Adriano Visconti, achieved 11 of his 26 credited victories in the few weeks he was able to fly the Veltro, while the top-scoring Sergente Maggiore pilota Luigi Gorrini shooting down 14 enemy aircraft plus six damaged with the C.205.

The C.205 saw only a relatively small production run prior to the end of the conflict, which was primarily the result of various limitations in place on the Italian war economy. Akin to the Supermarine Spitfire, the Veltro features some complex elements in its construction and was fairly slow to build. During the immediate postwar years, Macchi continued to refurbish and sell C.205s, often through the conversion of surplus C.202s. One key customer for the type during the late 1940s was the Egyptian Air Force, which ordered 62 C.205Vs. Several of these Egyptian fighters briefly saw action during the 1948 Arab-Israeli War against the Israeli Air Force; Israeli intelligence agents allegedly sought to damage C.205s in Italy before they could be delivered to Egypt. The C.205 was phased out of service during the mid 1950s in favour of jet-propelled fighter aircraft.

== Design and development ==
=== Background ===
During 1941, seeking to further improve the performance of the C.202 fighter, the Regia Aeronautica decided to license-build the German Daimler-Benz DB 605 1,100 kW (1,500 hp) liquid-cooled supercharged inverted V-12 engine in Italy, which Fiat produced as the RA.1050 R.C.58 Tifone (Typhoon). Fighter manufacturers were invited to enter versions of their designs using this engine as the caccia della serie 5 ("series-5 fighter") and were provided with imported DB 605s for prototype use. All of the designs used the number 5 in the name, thus Macchi's submission became the C.205 (instead of C.202bis or C.203).

Macchi had adopted a licence-built DB 601 engine for the C.202, an engine which was closely comparable in size to the later, more powerful DB 605. This meant that the C.202 airframe could be easily adapted for the DB 605; accordingly, Macchi opted to have the fuselage remain identical aft of the firewall. The resulting aircraft, which was designated C.205V Veltro, was considered to be a stop-gap measure while the definitive variant was intended to be the 205N Orione (N stood for "new").

On 19 April 1942, the C.205V Veltro performed its maiden flight; much of the subsequent flight testing was conducted at Guidonia Airfield on the outskirts of Rome. Testing revealed that both the Fiat G.55 Centauro and Re.2005 Sagittario were capable of greater performance while flying at high altitudes, largely due to their larger wing area. In fact, the Veltro used the same wing as the earlier Folgore but its weight had increased from 2,350 to 2,581 kg (5,181 to 5,690 lb) and the wing loading from 140 kg/m^{2} to 153.6 kg/m^{2}. The Veltro's performance was similar to German designs with their higher wing loading, and was at its best at medium altitudes where it could reach 642 km/h (399 mph). The C.205 Veltro was placed in production until the G.55 and the Re.2005 could become available.

The first 100 Veltro Serie I were solely armed with machine guns, although many aircraft were also fitted with the 20 mm MG 151 cannon. There were no Serie II built, but 150 Serie III were ordered, which were fitted with wing cannons as a standard.

Some delay was incurred by the necessity of re-engineering the aircraft's forward fuselage, leading to several months passing before the "205N" was flight-capable. On 1 November 1942, the C.205N1 made its first flight; at this point, the armament consisting of a single 20 mm cannon that fired through the propeller hub along with four cowling-mounted 12.7 mm (.5 in) Breda-SAFAT machine guns for which it carried 300–400 and 1,400 rounds of ammunition respectively. This configuration allowed for a higher ceiling at the cost of a reduced speed [629 km/h (391 mph)]. The better aerodynamics (with a longer and more streamlined rear fuselage) provided an advantage over the Macchi C.205V/MG151 [620 km/h (390 mph)].

On 19 May 1943, the second prototype, designated C.205N2, took place; during testing, it reportedly attained 628 kilometres per hour (390 mph), which was marginally slower than the C.205N1 with a correspondingly longer time to reach its operational altitude. It was equipped with a single engine-mounted 20 mm cannon, a pair of wing-mounted 20 mm cannon and two fuselage-mounted 12.7 mm (.5 in) machine guns. The ammunition load comprised 600 or more 12.7 mm (.5 in) rounds and a maximum of around 900 20 mm rounds which was much heavier than that carried by the C.205N1 and more than that of the Reggiane and the Fiat which carried 490–550 and 650 20 mm rounds respectively. Although 1,200 aircraft were ordered, the design was abandoned due to the Italian armistice.

The N-series aircraft should have performed better than the C.205V but Macchi test pilot Guido Carestiato noted that their flying characteristics were inferior to the lighter and more agile C.205 Veltro. The later series also experienced overheating while climbing.

=== Design ===
The C.205, known initially as the C.202bis, was generally similar to the previous Folgore, although there were numerous differences in the fuselage: the tail was larger, the cockpit and its hump were redesigned, the antenna mast was bigger and some modifications were made to the wings. Both the C.202 and C.205 had the port wing 8" longer than the starboard to compensate lift for engine torque. While new-build C.205s were furnished with a more aerodynamic retractable tailwheel, converted C.202 airframes remained the fixed tailwheel arrangement instead.

The C.205 was a single-seat, all-metal, monoplane fighter, intended primarily as an interceptor but with ground attack and escort capabilities. The long nose housed the DB605 engine which drove a three-blade, constant-speed metal propeller, with the main fuel tank situated between the engine and the cockpit. The C.205 was fitted with a twin-barrel radiator, which was positioned underneath the centre section of the fuselage directly beneath the cockpit; this arrangement provided superior airflow, and thereby engine cooling, to its counterpart on the C.202. Within the aircraft's compact rear section was the radio equipment, oxygen cylinder and an 80 L (20 US gal) reserve fuel tank. The wings were made of light aluminium alloys and steel, having two spars and three sections, housing two additional fuel tanks, and the fully retractable wide-set main undercarriage gear. Apart from the all-metal flaps in the inner wing, all the other control surfaces were metal-framed and fabric-covered. Veltros had self-sealing fuel tanks, an armoured seat, and armoured windscreen as standard. The cramped cockpit possessed a limited field-of-view, but some examples were fitted with a rear-view mirror.

The 827 kg/1,823 lb (normal) payload consisted of the fully equipped pilot (85 kg/187 lb), fuel (307 kg/677 lb), two Breda machine guns and two Mauser MG 151/20 cannon (60 and 84 kg/130 and 185 lb respectively), 740 rounds of 12.7 mm (.5 in) ammunition (76 kg/168 lb), 500 rounds of 20 mm ammunition (100 kg/220 lb), and other sundry items such as oil (33 kg/73 lb), oxygen cylinder (12 kg/26 lb) and radio equipment. Additionally, 100 L (30 US gal) fuel tanks or 160 kg (350 lb) of bombs could be carried on two underwing hardpoints. Due to a lack of passenger transport aircraft, modifications were made to a C.205 to enable it to carry eight passengers in the belly of the fuselage and, among others, three pilots of 51° Wing (including Adriano Visconti) made the journey from Sardinia to Italy after the Armistice in this manner.

Veltros originally had "tropical" pattern camouflage, with a sand brown base coat and irregular black-green lines all over their surface (referred to as "smoke rings"). Those in service with Aeronautica Nazionale Repubblicana were painted an overall dark green (nearly black), while others adopted a variation of the "tropical" pattern or carried a camouflage pattern based on the German "Splinter Pattern" consisting of RLM 74 and 75, Gey/Green over RLM 76 Blue.

=== Relative performance ===
The following are relative performance and characteristics data for the three versions of the C.205 (or MC.205, as the machines designed by Castoldi were often called):

	C.205V	C.205N/1	C.205N/2
Minimum weight (kg)	2,581	2,695	2,759
Maximum weight (kg)	3,408	3,621	3,794
Payload (kg)	827	926	935
Ceiling (m)	11,200	11,500	11,800
Range (km)	950	1,020	950
Maximum speed (km/h)	642/620 (at 7,500 m) ^{[1]}	629 (at 6,500 m)	628 (at 6,500 m)
Time to 5,000 m altitude	4 min 47 sec	5 min 46 sec	6 min 14 sec
Time to 6,000 m altitude	5 min 53 sec ^{[2]}	6 min 07 sec	7 min 38 sec
Time to 7,000 m altitude	7 min 06 sec ^{[2]}	7 min 45 sec	9 min 07 sec
Time to 8,000 m altitude	9 min 09 sec ^{[2]}	9 min 25 sec	10 min 47 sec

Notes:
1. Series I/III
2. Under ideal conditions

Although these figures provide an indication of the relative performance of each variant, and showed that the Orione, especially the N2, suffered as a result of the weight increase (particularly in climbs), they are not truly representative as they were obtained under different test conditions. As opposed to the two N versions, the Veltro was tested under ideal conditions, i.e. at light weight (3,250 kg (7,170 lb) and with full emergency power (2,750 rpm). In a climb to 6,000 m (20,000 ft), a Veltro III series, fully equipped and using combat (not emergency) power at 2,600 rpm needed seven minutes.

== Production ==
At the end of evaluation tests, the C.205 began series production, with a first order of 250 aircraft. The first C.205 left the factory in September 1942. Efforts were made to get the type produced as quickly as possible, however, the speed of production was relatively slow (about 12 machines per month) in spite of these endeavours. This low production rate had been attributed to shortage of both engines and various strategic materials. It was only in June 1943 that Macchi managed to complete the first batch of 100 fighters. It took until September before production reached 177 examples, of which 146 were delivered to Regia Aeronautica units.

== Operational history ==
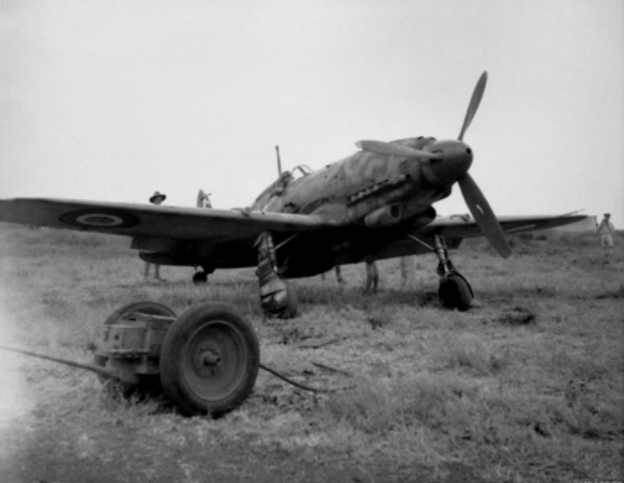
An Italian C.205 at Catania airfield, Sicily, Italy

The C.205 entered production only five months after its maiden flight and began reaching front line units in February 1943. At the end of April, the 1° Stormo, based in Pantelleria, is the first unit to enter action with the C.205, on Mediterranean, escorting maritime and aerial convoys to and from Tunisia. During their first sortie, 22 C.205 clashed with very good results against more numerous formations of Curtiss P-40s and Supermarine Spitfires. During the next few months, C.205s of the Regia Aeronautica were involved in several major engagements with some of the 4,000 Allied aircraft that were stationed in the Mediterranean at that time. At the end of May, because of the vulnerability of Pantelleria, the 1° Stormo was moved to Sigonella airfield in Sicily and the minor airstrip of Finocchiara, 15 km south-east of Ragusa. On 8 June 1943, 15 C.205s of 1° Stormo escorted three torpedo bombers attacking Allied ships which were shelling Pantelleria's defenses. At the end of June, the Stormo had no more serviceable Veltros. On 24 June, 1° Stormo left Sicily for Osoppo, then later Ronchi dei Legionari, and was replaced by 4° Stormo. Few pilots returned to Udine, while the remaining aircraft joined other units.

4° Stormo, which had left Africa in January 1943, was re-equipped with C.202s and C.205s on the airfields of Campoformido (10° Gruppo) and Bresso (9° Gruppo). It was then moved to Rome-Ciampino airport. On 9 July 1943 (the eve of the Allied invasion of Sicily), 4° Stormo was based on the Catania plain, with a complement of 10 Veltros and 38 Folgores (no Italian unit was equipped with Veltros alone). Later it received a batch of a further 10 C.205s. The Italian pilots flew as many as six sorties per day, but on 14 July, with the first Allied paratroopers landing on the Catania plain, 4° Stormo was forced to retreat to Crotone airfield in Calabria after setting fire to four or five damaged C.205s that could not be repaired in time.

51° Stormo fought with some success over Sardinia (apart from the battle of 2 August), but sustained heavy losses, especially at the end of July and the beginning of August. 3° Stormo C.T., commanded by Tenente Colonnello Tito Falconi, also had the opportunity to fly the Veltro in combat. At the time it was based at Cerveteri airstrip, with the task of defending Rome, 83ª, 85ª and 95ª Squadriglia, 18° Gruppo (of 3° Stormo) all received a number of C.205s. Commander Falconi assigned them to the most eminent pilots: Sergente Maggiore Luigi Gorrini, Tenente Franco Bordoni-Bisleri and Maresciallo Guido Fibbia. 3° Stormo used the new type effectively to intercept American bombers and fighters in the skies over Latium. "The Macchi fighter possessed some excellent qualities, and the Italian pilots made optimum use of the aircraft which had a maximum speed of 644 km/h (400 mph)."

One of the greatest British fighter pilots of the Second World War, Group Captain Duncan-Smith DSO DFC, respected both the C.205 and the Italian airmen who flew it:

In general the standard of flying of the Italian pilots was very high indeed, and in encounters with Macchi 205s particularly we were up against aircraft that could turn and dog-fight with our Spitfires extremely well.

Like its predecessors, the first Veltros were insufficiently armed, but the aircraft often performed well in combat. Guido Carestiato said the C.205 was the "best Italian fighter that he knew". The C.205 ace Luigi Gorrini scored 19 or 24 victories (in return, he was downed four or five times). Gorrini claimed 12 victories in July 1943, several of them with the Veltro.

=== Battle of Pantelleria ===
Regia Aeronautica C.205V with a North Africa dust filter.

1° Stormo received the first Veltros in time to fight over the southern Italian air base. In free-ranging patrols, the wing fielded 24 Veltros (around ^{1}/_{10} of all those produced) and nine Folgores in an attempt to intercept enemy aircraft in the area. While patrolling between Cap Bon and Cap Mustafà on 20 April 1943, Italian fighters spotted a large enemy formation 35 km (22 mi) west of Pantelleria. The Italians started to close in to the aircraft of Nos. 1, 92, 417, and 601 SAAF Squadrons, which were flying at low level, but were surprised by six Polish pilots of 145 Squadron flying high cover. These were joined by other Spitfires, and the 33 Macchis found themselves in combat with up to 60 Spitfires (mainly Mk VCs, and possibly Mk VIIIs and IXs). The Italian pilots claimed 15 victories (one by Maresciallo Baschirotto, who fired 500 rounds), with 14 Spitfires downed in the sea and another over African soil.

However, another analysis of this combat shows that the Regia Aeronautica pilots claimed a total of 17 aircraft on 20 April and claimed to have downed 15 Spitfires in this engagement; although Italian ground observers claimed to have seen 14 aircraft crash into the sea or onto land, only one Spitfire, flown by F/O Władysław Drecki of 145 Sqn, was heavily damaged. In return, three C.205Vs were lost. There is also a possibility that Bf 109s of I./JG77 were involved in this engagement.

Allied records report only two C.205Vs downed (Tenenti Andreoli and Fanelli), while another made an emergency landing near Cap Bon, and explains why some sources quote two losses and others three, but there is some doubt as to whether this aircraft, the only one to touch down on African soil, was a Veltro or a Folgore. At least one other Macchi was damaged, and the pilot wounded. Similarly, the Italian claims did not match any losses recorded in Allied squadron reports.

=== Battle of Capo Pula ===
On 2 August 1943, two British Beaufighters were downed and the Italians sent a CANT Z.506 Airone aircraft escorted by four C.205Vs on a search-and-rescue mission. A group of P-40s attacked the Z.506, but despite the defence put up by the Veltros, one American fighter crashed into the Z.506 and both fell into the sea.

A USAAF search and rescue PBY Catalina mission was also mounted, escorted by 12 P-38s. C.202 and C.205s of 51° Stormo, led by Ennio Tarantola, intercepted this flight. The Catalina was taken by surprise on the surface near the Sardinian coast, having broken a propeller blade in the heavy sea conditions. The Italians also claimed to have downed all 12 P-38s, whereas the Americans claimed three or four victories over the Axis fighters with no losses. Later records showed that only the Catalina and the C.202 of Maresciallo Bianchi, a close friend of Tarantola, had been shot down.

The two or three victories over P-38s claimed by Tarantola are not supported by any data available; however, no further SAR missions were made by Americans to search for the downed pilots. Except for a crewman killed by strafing, the crew of the Catalina was saved, thanks to a fast vessel of the Royal Navy whose captain was awarded the DSC for battling adverse sea conditions, coastal battery fire and enemy aircraft while rescuing the survivors.

=== Defence of Rome ===
In mid 1943, Gorrini obtained one of the three C.205s delivered to the 3° Stormo (the other two were assigned to other aces, Tenente Franco Bordoni Bisleri and Maresciallo Guido Fibbia). In six weeks, during the Difesa di Roma, Gorrini became the top scoring C.205 pilot; by the Armistice, he had claimed three Consolidated B-24 Liberators, three Lockheed P-38 Lightnings (three damaged), two B-17s and two Spitfires.

Given the shortage of modern aircraft, the more advanced combat aircraft, such as the Veltros, were usually given to the best flyers and most experienced pilots like Vittorio Minguzzi.

=== After the Armistice ===
At the time of the Armistice between Italy and Allied armed forces on 8 September 1943, the Regia Aeronautica had received 177 Veltros, but only 66 were still usable. Six of these flew to Allied airfields to serve with the Italian Co-Belligerent Air Force.

=== Aeronautica Nazionale Repubblicana ===
A total of 29 C.205s reached northern airfields and were used by the Italian Social Republic Air Force (ANR – Aeronautica Nazionale Repubblicana).

Macchi produced the remaining 72 aircraft of the third series for the ANR before production was shut down by Allied bombing in May 1944. Statistics on aircraft production post-Armistice are unclear and incomplete. In general, C.205s fought well in RSI service: they were attached to units that had homogeneous equipment, or at least of comparable quality, and were guided by German radar stations. Though few in number, they achieved success in inflicting losses on Allied bombers and fighters. The first air battle of the Aeronautica Nazionale Repubblicana – still with German insignia – took place on 3 January 1944. The C.205s, guided by Italian ace Capitano Adriano Visconti, intercepted a formation of Boeing B-17 Flying Fortresses and their escort of Lockheed P-38 Lightnings bombing RIV factories in Villar Perosa. On 24 January, the Macchi 205 were transferred to two bases in Friuli. On 28 January, the C.205s, now with Italian markings, succeeded in shooting down a B-24 Liberator, their first four-engined American bomber. This air victory was credited to Sergente Marconcini, wingman of the ace Visconti.

1° Gruppo, based in Udine, was equipped with a few Veltros. According to one author:

At the start of February 1944, 1° Gruppo was transferred to a base on the outskirts of Reggio Emilia, with the task of attacking Allied four-engined bombers and the P-51s that escorted them. Dogfights with the aircraft that could be considered the best fighter of the time meant that the Italian pilots were hard pressed; however they were able to claim 58 Mustangs, though at a high price. At the end of May 1944, the number of C.205s of the ANR was so low that the unit had to be re-equipped with Fiat G.55.

A few Veltros were also delivered to 3° Gruppo, based in Vicenza, while further Veltros were scattered throughout other small units. Regia Aeronautica also had a poor opinion about the C.205N, plagued by overheating in the climb. The 1° Gruppo C.T. of the ANR, based at the Campoformido airfield, was equipped with C.205. Its first operation, on 3 January, began with a surprise blow right away: the Italian fighter pilots shot down four P-38 Lightnings. By 25 February, 1° Gruppo C.T. had reported 26 victories for nine losses. An extremely bitter aerial combat took place on 11 March. The Italians claimed 12 victories for themselves, but lost three of their own pilots, including 1st Lt Boscutti, who was killed by an American P-38 Lightning pilot after he had bailed out from his stricken fighter and was hanging from his parachute. On 18 March, 30 C.205s from 1° Gruppo C.T. and 60 Bf 109 from JG.77 joined combat with about 450 Allied bombers and their escorts, shooting down at least four enemy aircraft, but Corp. Zaccaria was killed while hanging from his parachute again by a P-38 pilot who fired at him from close range. Allied bombing in April 1944 destroyed most of the Macchi and Fiat facilities bringing fighter production to an end. With the interruption of production, the Italians were forced to re-equip their three groups almost fully with Bf 109s, largely because the Germans were quick to offer some of their best models, including Bf 109G-6s and Bf 109K-4s. The Allies were less generous with the Italian Co-Belligerent Air Force (ICAF), and Veltros, including some upgraded C.202s, were slowly replaced with worn-out P-39s and Spitfires, but not before summer 1944.

=== In Luftwaffe service ===
Luftwaffe II.Gruppe of JG 77 operated with requisitioned C.205Vs for two months, from October until December 1943, when the German unit was re-equipped with new Bf 109s. Thus there are photos of C.205s with black crosses painted over the mid-fuselage Italian white stripe markings. The Germans were less enthusiastic about the C.205Vs, nor were they really impressed by the early evaluations in spring of 1943. There is mention in the KTB (History diary) on 25 November 1943 page: "the group has 23 Macchi, 11 are ready to fight. Macchi is fast and had a good flying characteristics, except for the tendency to lose control in sharp turns. The fighter is disadvantaged because its radio, while powerful, is far from reliable in action. Refueling and rearming process is slow and difficult, it takes much time to make the fighters ready. Today's mission was made with 17 Macchis, radio control problems caused delays, and the mission concluded without intercepting the enemy." In the brief German use, Veltros had at least five losses by accidents, often caused by the inverted throttle used on Italian aircraft (In German and Allied fighters the "open throttle" position was forward, not back, and this was the source of several errors). The first losses occurred on 27 September 1943 near Albenga. Two German pilots were killed and other wounded in these accidents. On the other side, it was recorded only one aerial combat in which Germans claimed at least one P-38 and two probable (1 December 1943).

After II.JG 77 was equipped with new Bf 109s, the C.205s were sent to Italian units. Some Veltros were ferried by JG 53.

=== In Croatian Service ===
A small batch of C.205s were in service with the Air Force of the Independent State of Croatia, Zrakoplovstvo Nezavisne Države Hrvatske (ZNDH) in 1944, but the Croatian "Veltros" flew few sorties and were soon overwhelmed by the waves of Allied fighters that swarmed over Yugoslavian skies. On 30 June 1944, three recently arrived C.205s, flown by Eastern Front veterans (Major Josip Helebrant, Oberleutenant Ljudevit "Lujo" Bencetic and Feldwebel Bozidar "Bosko" Bartulovic), along with three inexperienced pilots in C.202s, took off to intercept USAAF Fifteenth Air force bombers heading to bomb Blechhammer, location of Nazi Germany chemical plants, prisoner of war (POW) camps, and forced labor camps. The Macchis attacked the USAAF bombers and their escorting fighters, 5th FS/52nd FG P-51 Mustangs over Bjelovar, but five of the Italian-built aircraft were shot down both by the bomber's defensive fire and by the Mustangs. Only Bencetic – an ace with a final score of 15 kills and his "Veltro" succeeded in returning to base at Zagreb. Helebrant and Bartulovic bailed out and survived the war, with a final score of, respectively, 11 and eight kills.

=== Postwar ===
C.205 Veltro in service with the postwar Aeronautica Militare, around 1960

Production of the C.205 continued in the immediate aftermath of the Second World War; the Aeronautica Militare Italiana (AMI) proceeded to take delivery of Macchi-built C.205s until late 1948. Nor would the AMI be the sole customer of the type.

During 1948–1949, Egypt received 62 refurbished C.205Vs, of which 41 were converted from C.202 airframes. In May 1948, eight C.205V and 16 C.202 were upgraded and in February 1949, three brand new and 15 ex-MC.202, and in May another 10 MC.205 and 10 MC.202 were upgraded. This last contract was not finalized and, given the end of the 1948 Arab Israeli War (1948–49), the fighters were delivered to the AMI instead. Egypt also ordered 19 G.55s and Syria another 16, all new-built.

The new Veltros were fully equipped, while the Folgore conversions were armed with only two 12.7 mm Breda machine guns. They were the lightest series of the entire production, and consequently had the best performance, but were seriously under-armed. A total of 15 Macchis were delivered to Egypt before the end of the 1948 Arab-Israeli War, seeing brief combat against the Israeli Air Force. Some Veltros, equipped with underwing bomb racks were used in ground-attack sorties against Israeli targets. On 7 January 1949, a C.205 claimed an Israeli P-51D Mustang. In return, two or three Veltros had been claimed by IAF fighters by the end of the war in July, with another six under repair.

Israeli secret services reacted with a bombing in Italy, which at the time was supplying both Israel and the Arab states. On 15 February 1947, an SM.95 airliner was destroyed, possibly by sabotage, soon after takeoff from Rome. On board were an Egyptian princess, several politicians and an Italian intelligence officer. A subsequent bombing was at Venegono on 18 September 1948; one hangar was damaged by several explosive devices, destroying three MB.308 and one MC.205 in Macchi facilities. The hangar, not totally demolished, contained several Veltros destined for Egypt. All the G.55s ordered by Egypt were armed with four Breda (12.7 mm) machine-guns, and they were brand new; 16 were single-seaters and three were twin-seaters. Syria ordered 15 G.55A; all single-seaters.

The MM/Snc were: Macchi first batch: 1201–1224; second batch, 1225–1242. Fiat G.55A were 91214–91220, 91225–91229, 91221-91224 (G.55B two-seats).

During 1951, the final batch of Veltros were delivered, the fighter serving mainly with No.2 Sqn until the mid-1950s. The last batch, 20 Veltros (10 ex-MC.202, six Veltro sr.III and 4 sr.I) were assigned to AMI with deliveries continuing until 29 May 1951. The phasing out process was however swift, because the new Anglo-American jet fighters were available at a surprisingly low cost at the time of the official phasing out of the Veltro (around 1951), although the last MC.205 was phased out in 1955. The "Folgore" was stricken off register in 1948, with the exception of those C.202 airframes transformed into Veltros.

== An Allied test pilot's opinion ==
Captain Eric Brown, Chief Naval Test Pilot and commanding officer of the Royal Aircraft Establishment's Captured Enemy Aircraft Flight, remembered how impressed the members of the unit were when they tested the Veltro. "One of the finest aircraft I ever flew was the Macchi MC. 205. Oh, beautiful. And here you had the perfect combination of Italian styling and German engineering. I believe it was powered by a Daimler Benz DB 605. It was really a delight to fly, and up to anything on the Allied programme. But again, it came just before the Italians capitulated so it was never used extensively. And we did tests on it and were most impressed. The cockpit was smallish but not as bad as the Bf 109."

== Variants ==
With limited production and service life, the C.205 saw only a few modifications. After the first 100 examples, the wing-mounted 7.7 mm (.303 in) machine guns were replaced with a couple of 20 mm MG 151 cannon.

M.C.205
One prototype armed with two 12.7 mm (0.5 in) and two 7.7 mm (0.303 in) machine guns.
M.C.205V
Main production version.
M.C.205S
Long-range escort fighter with a 200 L (53 US gal) fuel tank replacing the fuselage machine guns; 18 converted from production aircraft.
M.C.205N
Proposed DB 605-powered fighter with a more significant design revision than the C.202-derived C.205V. The aircraft had a new wing with the wingspan increased to 11.25 metres (36 feet 11 inches) and wing area increased to 19 m^{2} (200 ft^{2}), and a lengthened fuselage that brought the length to 9.65 m. Also, the fuselage was finally adapted for a 20 mm MG 151 cannon. The heavier weight resulted in decreased performance and handling.
M.C.205N-1
High-altitude interceptor fighter prototype. Armed with four 12.7 mm (0.5 in) machine guns mounted in the fuselage, and one 20 mm cannon mounted in the engine.
M.C.205N-2 Orione
High-altitude interceptor fighter prototype. Armed with three 20 mm cannon and two 12.7 mm (0.5 in) machine guns. The machine gun bulges were replaced by a streamlined fairing.
M.C.206
Similar armament to the C.205N/1 with a larger yet lighter wing (21 m^{2}). Reduced weight resulting in performances similar to that of the C.205V again. The larger wing would have enabled it to fight at higher altitudes. Single prototype destroyed by Allied bombing before being completed.
M.C.207
Powered by a Daimler-Benz DB 603 engine. Other than that, similar to C.206 but with armament of four 20 mm cannon, none built.

== Operators ==
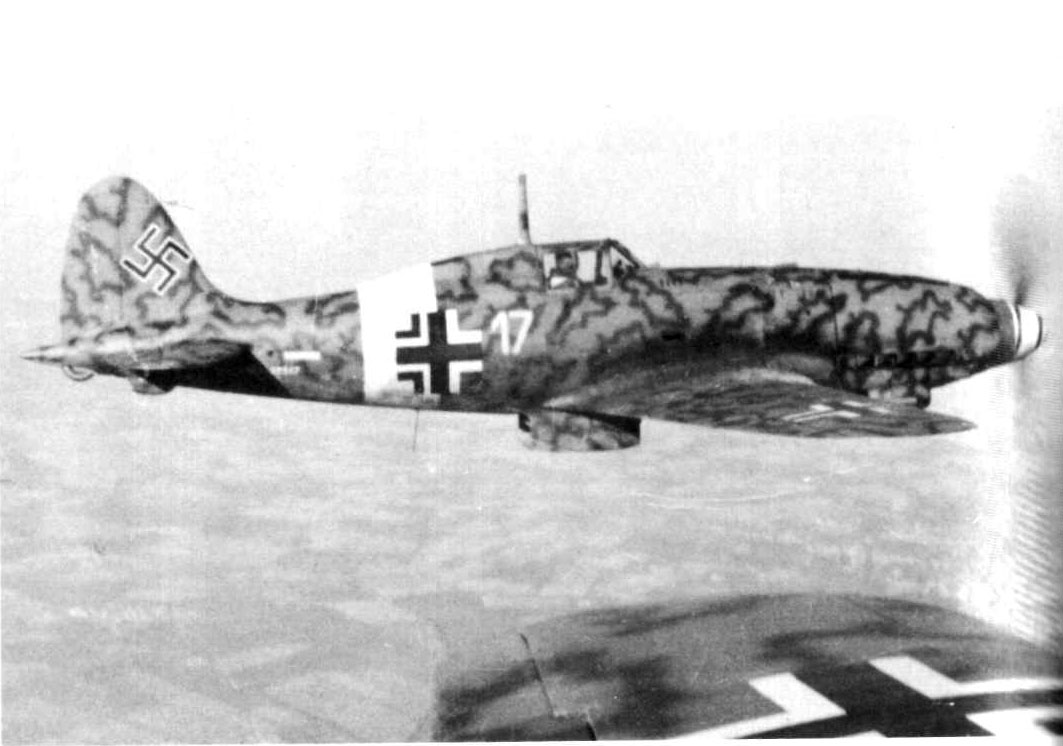
A C.205 with German markings, 1943

Independent State of Croatia

- Zrakoplovstvo Nezavisne Države Hrvatske received 4 aircraft.

Egypt

- Royal Egyptian Air Force
  - No.2 Squadron REAF

Germany

- Luftwaffe
  - II/JG 77 operated 25 aircraft.

Kingdom of Italy

- Regia Aeronautica
- Italian Co-Belligerent Air Force received 6 aircraft.

Italian Social Republic

- Aeronautica Nazionale Repubblicana received 101 aircraft.

Italy

- Italian Air Force operated some Macchi C.205 until 1947

Australia

- Royal Australian Air Force One Macchi MC.205V Serie 1 was captured intact by Australians on Pachino Airfield, in Sicily, Summer 1943. It was a MC.205 of First Series without the cannons in the wing, but armed with two 12,7mm machine guns in engine cowling synchronized with the propeller and two 7,7mm machine guns on the wings.

== Surviving aircraft ==
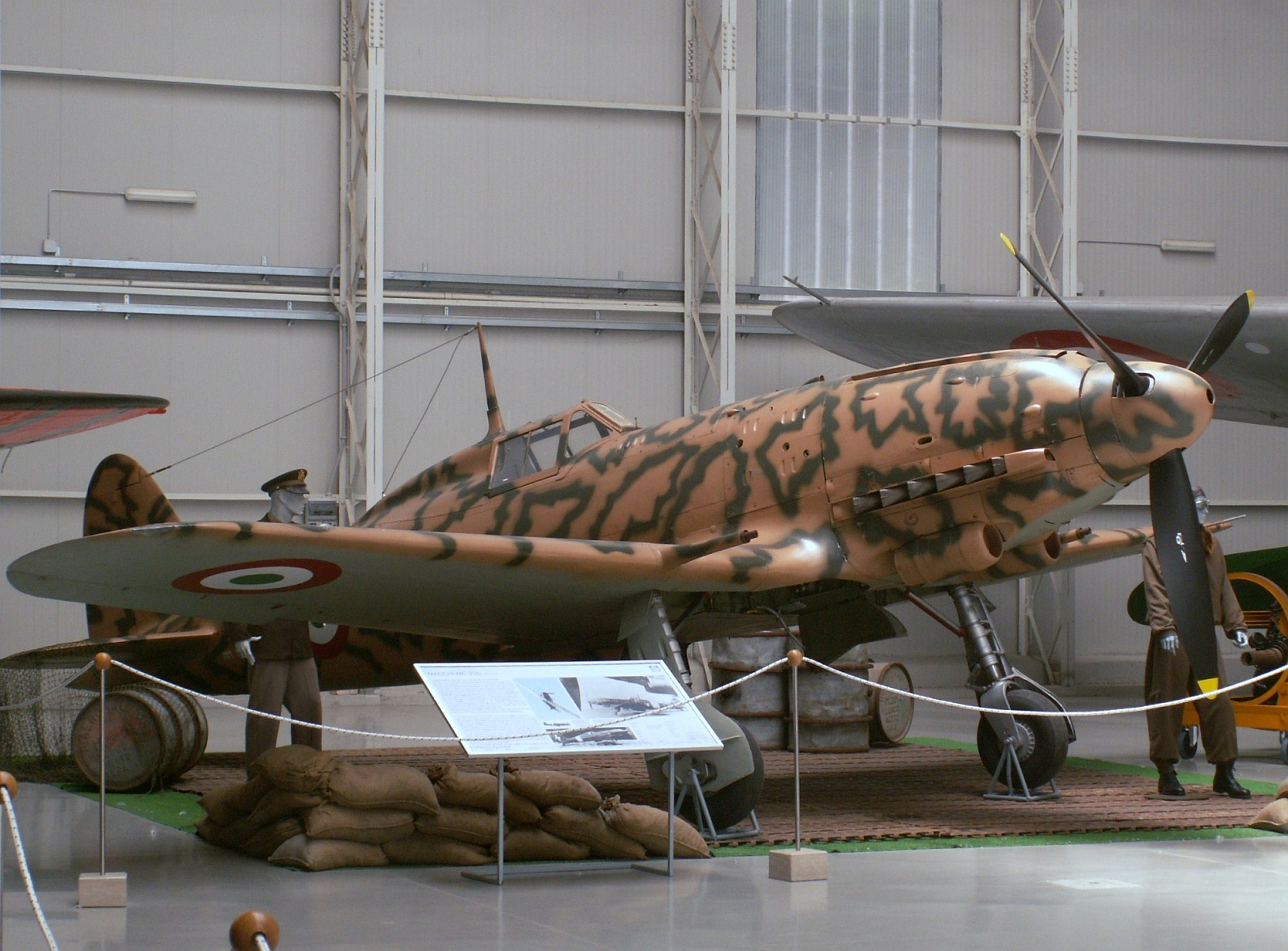
C.205 at Vigna di Valle

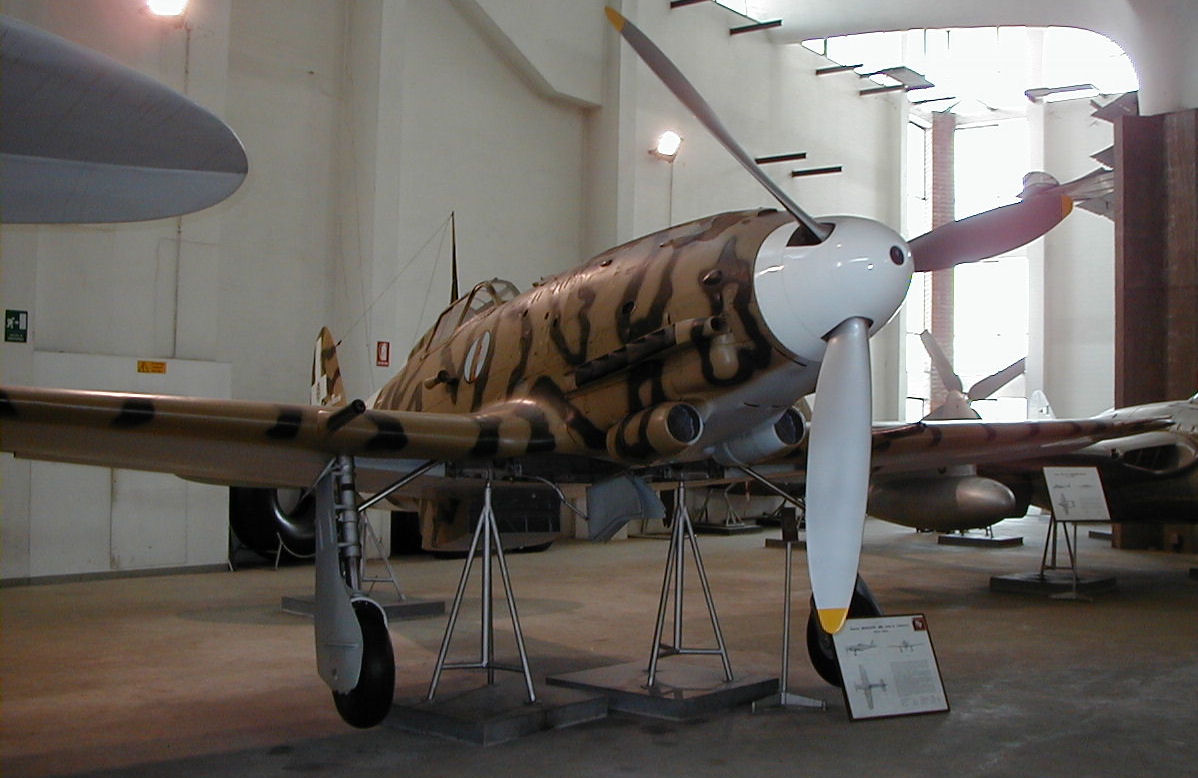
C.205V at the National Museum of Science and Technology

Three Veltros survive today, one of which was restored to flying condition and participated in numerous aerial displays until the end of 1986.

All C.205s that are preserved are hybrids made up of parts of C.202s mixed with those of C.205s.

One, MM.91818 (bearing the registration MM 9327), is on display at the National Museum of Science and Technology in Milan. Restoration was completed in 1981 by the Italian Air Force together with Fiat and Aermacchi.

Another two are on display at the Museo storico dell'Aeronautica Militare in Vigna di Valle. MM.9546 is displayed as a MC.205 and MM.92166 is displayed as a MC.202.

In November 2006 the engine and cockpit of a crashed C.205 were found 8 meters underground, with the pilot still in his seat, in Correzzola.

A C.205 replica can be seen outside Rome's Palazzo dell'Aeronautica, and another in Volandia Park and Museum of Flight at Vizzola Ticino.

== Specifications (C.205V) ==
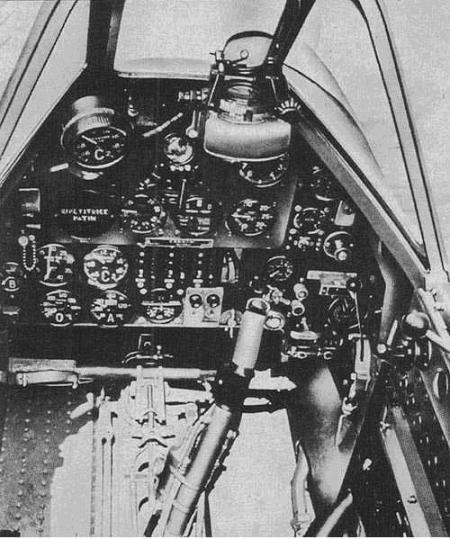
Cockpit of a C.205

Data from The Complete Book of Fighters

General characteristics

- Crew: 1
- Length: 8.85 m (29 ft 0 in)
- Wingspan: 10.58 m (34 ft 9 in)
- Height: 3.04 m (10 ft 0 in)
- Wing area: 16.8 m^{2} (181 sq ft)
- Airfoil: root: NACA 23018 (modified); tip: NACA 23009 (modified)
- Empty weight: 2,581 kg (5,690 lb)
- Gross weight: 3,408 kg (7,513 lb)
- Max takeoff weight: 3,900 kg (8,598 lb)
- Powerplant: 1 × Fiat RA.1050 R.C.58 Tifone V-12 inverted liquid-cooled piston engine, 1,100 kW (1,500 hp)
- Propellers: 3-bladed constant-speed propeller

Performance

- Maximum speed: 642 km/h (399 mph, 347 kn) at 7,200 m (23,600 ft)
- Cruise speed: 400 km/h (250 mph, 220 kn)
- Range: 950 km (590 mi, 510 nmi)
- Service ceiling: 11,500 m (37,700 ft)
- Time to altitude: ,3,000 m (9,800 ft) in two minutes and 40 seconds
- Wing loading: 202.9 kg/m^{2} (41.6 lb/sq ft)

Armament

- Guns:
  - 2 × 12.7 mm (.5 in) Breda-SAFAT machine guns, 400 rpg, in the nose
  - 2 × 20 mm MG 151 cannon, 250 rpg, in the wings
- Bombs:
  - 2 × 160 kg (350 lb)

== See also ==
Related development

- Macchi C.200 Saetta
- Macchi C.202 Folgore

Aircraft of comparable role, configuration, and era

- Fiat G.55 Centauro
- Kawasaki Ki-61-II
- Messerschmitt Bf 109G
- Supermarine Spitfire Mk.IX
- Reggiane Re.2005 Sagittario
- Yakovlev Yak-9D

Related lists

- List of aircraft of World War II
- List of fighter aircraft
- List of Regia Aeronautica aircraft used in World War II
