= Luigi Gorrini =

Italian flying ace (1917–2014)

- Sergente Maggiore Luigi Gorrini (D'Amico-Valentini archive)
- Born: 12 July 1917; Alseno, Kingdom of Italy
- Died: 8 November 2014 (aged 97); Alseno, Italy
- Burial place: Castelnuovo Fogliani
- Military career
- Allegiance: Kingdom of Italy; Italian Social Republic
- Branch: Regia Aeronautica; Aeronautica Militare Italiana
- Service years: 1933 – 1945
- Rank: Sergente Maggiore
- Units: 85ª Squadriglia, 18° Gruppo, 3° Stormo (RA); 1° Gruppo (ANR); 50°Stormo AMI
- Conflicts: Second World War: Battle of Britain; Invasion of France; North African Campaign; Italian Campaign
- Awards: Medaglia d'Oro al Valor Militare "a vivente" Medaglia di Bronzo al Valor Militare; German Iron Cross first and second class

Luigi Gorrini, MOVM (12 July 1917 – 8 November 2014), was an Italian World War II fighter pilot in the Regia Aeronautica and in the Aeronautica Nazionale Repubblicana. During the conflict, he flew with the Corpo Aereo Italiano (CAI, Italian Air Corps) during the Battle of Britain, fought over Libya and Tunisia, and was involved in the defence of the Italian mainland. Gorrini is believed to have shot down 19 Allied planes (24 according to some sources), and damaged another 9, of several types: Bristol Beaufighter, Bristol Blenheim, Curtiss P-40, Spitfire, P-38 Lightning, P-47 Thunderbolt, B-17 Flying Fortress and B-24 Liberator. He piloted the biplane Fiat C.R.42 and monoplanes Macchi C.202 and C.205 Veltro. With the Veltro he shot down 14 Allied planes and damaged six more. At the time of his death, he was the only surviving fighter pilot awarded the Medaglia d'Oro al Valor Militare (Gold Medal of Military Valor).

== North Africa and Greece ==
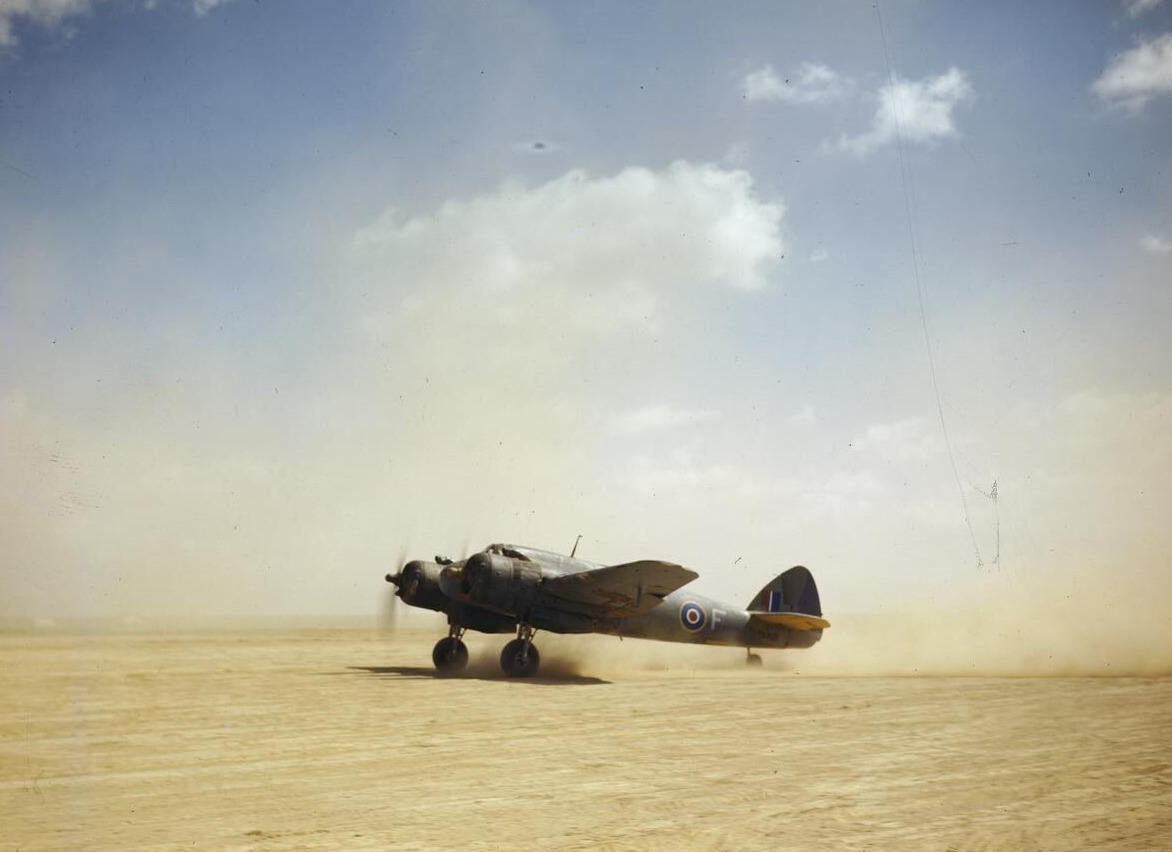
Bristol Beaufighter Mk 1, North Africa - The first aircraft shot down by Gorrini was one of the first Bristol Beaufighters that arrived in North Africa

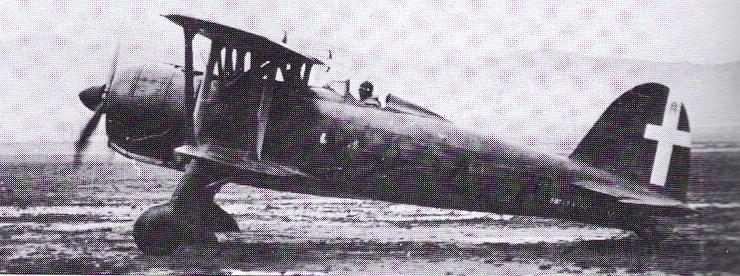
A Fiat CR.42 in Regia Aeronautica service. Flying this nimble biplane, Gorrini scored his first victory on 16 April 1941, over Derna, in Cyrenaica.

Gorrini came to North Africa as a member of 85^{a} Squadriglia of 18° Gruppo C.T.. He shot down his first aircraft on 16 April 1941, over Derna, in Cyrenaica, Libya. While flying a CR.42 during a solo protection sortie, he intercepted two of the Bristol Beaufighters that had just arrived in the Mediterranean Theatre. Gorrini opened fire immediately before the two British aircraft reached the airstrip N 1 on Ftheja, where his 85ª Squadriglia was based. He shot the leading aircraft from a distance of 700–800 meters, landing hits on the right wingtip. While the second Beaufighter was taking evasive action, Gorrini closed to a distance of 250 meters hitting the first Bristol again. The British aircraft was by now very near to the Italian airstrip, so Gorrini strafed it a third time and the Beaufighter crashed just south of the airstrip. He was credited with a kill and a damaged and shot 1,100 rounds.

On 29 May, Gorrini intercepted two Blenheim bombers over Benghazi. He shot down one that fell just outside the city and shot all his remaining ammunition at the other Blenheim that managed to escape. Repatriated with his unit, on 29 August he was on Caselle Torinese airfield to start the training on the new monoplane fighters, the Fiat G.50 and Macchi C.200. Gorrini and the rest of 18° Gruppo moved lately on Mirafiori base and then to Ciampino Sud airfield, where the training on the G.50 and the C.200 came to an end on 10 December when his Gruppo flew with Macchi C.200s to Lecce and then to the new base of Araxos, in Greece. During the winter of 1941–42, he escorted convoys between Italy and Greece. On 17 December, in the air space around Argostoli port, in Kefalonia island, Gorrini intercepted two Bristol Blenheims, painted in black. He attacked the leading aircraft, hitting it repeatedly and then strafed the second. The two aircraft disappeared in the clouds and Gorrini was credited with a "probable" and a "damaged". Gorrini had no other chance to clash with the enemy and he flew back to Italy with his Gruppo, on 25 April 1942. Back in Italy, Gorrini and his fellow pilots were trained to fly the C.200 as a fighter bomber until mid-July. On 23 July, the 18° joined the 23° Gruppo on Abu Haggag base, in North Africa. There, Gorrini flew protection sorties for Axis ships and ground-attack missions. In October the 4° Stormo was moved back, it delivered his Macchi C. 202s to the 3°Stormo. "At last, with the Macchi 202 we had a competitive plane." On 2 January 1943, the whole 3° Stormo, now equipped with Macchi C.202s, took off to face two formations of Douglas DB.7 Bostons and B-25 Mitchells, escorted by Spitfires and P-40s. In the ensuing dogfight, Gorrini shot down an R.A.F. Curtiss P-40E Kittyhawk, that fell west of Sirte. He then damaged a Spitfire that was attacking another Macchi. Gorrini shot 880 bullets, but his aircraft had been hit: there were 12 holes in his fuselage. Nine days later, the whole 18° Gruppo was escorting C.200 fighter-bombers in action on British airfields in Uadi (or Wadi) Tamet area. Gorrini shot down a 92 RAF Squadron Spitfire and he damaged another from the squadron of the British ace Flying Officer Neville Duke, shooting 688 12.7mm bullets. His Gruppo was often tasked to strafe the advancing Allied columns or to escort German bombers. On the morning of 26 February 1943, he took off from El Hamma, to escort, with other pilots of his Squadriglia, Stukas attacking Allied armoured forces in Ksar Ghilane (an oasis of southern Tunisia located on the eastern limit of the Grand Erg Oriental), then he strafed the enemy troops. In the afternoon, on Kebili, with tenente Melis and two other fellow pilots, he intercepted four Allied aircraft. Gorrini claimed a Hawker Hurricane IID, armed with 40mm Vickers cannons. But this was his last air battle in Africa. His irritating eye injury was worsening. He was grounded and subsequently, at the end of February, hospitalised in Sfax. He returned to Italy in late March 1943.

== Defence of Rome ==
When Gorrini recovered, he was posted as a flying instructor to 3° Gruppo C (Complementare), based at Venaria Reale airfield. Later, Gorrini served as a ferry pilot to transfer captured French Dewoitine D.520 fighters from France to Italy, for Italian home defence. "I have collected several dozen Dewoitine from various French airfields and the Toulouse factory", he recalled later. "At the time, when we were still flying the Macchi C.200, it was a good, if not very good, machine. Compared to the Macchi 200, it was superior only in one point - its armament of the Hispano-Suiza HS 404 20mm cannon." Gorrini, who had, by February 1943 achieved four confirmed victories and one unconfirmed, was given, at the beginning of the summer of 1943, one of the three Macchi C.205 Veltro assigned to the 3° Stormo as a special favour (the other two were allotted to the ace Tenente Franco Bordoni Bisleri and to Maresciallo Guido Fibbia). During the summer of 1943, in defence of Italy, he claimed 11 enemy aircraft.

Regia Aeronautica C.205V - Luigi Gorrini was the Veltro top scoring ace. Flying this outstanding dog-fighter, he destroyed 14 Allied aircraft and damaged six more - Here a C.205 with a North Africa dust filter.

On 19 July, during a single sortie west of Rome, Gorrini destroyed a four-engined Consolidated B-24 Liberator bomber and a Lockheed P-38 Lightning (another P-38 was damaged). The next day, he claimed another P-38 destroyed and a P-38 damaged. On 25 July Benito Mussolini had been overthrown, but this had no decisive effect on the morale of the Regia Aeronautica. Gorrini recalled: "After 25 July, despite the arrest of Mussolini, the morale of my unit, 85^{a} Squadriglia and my personal readiness for action remained high. Despite all the reverses that Italy had suffered by the time, our 3° Stormo was the only one still fully ready for combat: my section was detailed to defend Rome. The larger part of the Regia Aeronautica was uninterested in politics or parties, they were men infatuated with flying and determined to defend the land of their birth and to give their lives if necessary in the attempt to stop the bombing of Italian towns."

On 13 August, Gorrini claimed a B-24 off the coast at Ostia, in the Lazio region, but he was also shot down by defensive fire from the bomber, bailing out safely. He claimed a Spitfire on 26 August. The next day, the whole Stormo scrambled to intercept four-engine bombers which were attacking Cerveteri, on the Latium coast in central Italy. Gorrini, still flying a Veltro, shot down two Boeing B-17 Flying Fortresses and a Lockheed P-38 Lightning in a single engagement (according to other sources, Gorrini claimed two B-24s). One wing of his C.205 was damaged after an overheating cannon muzzle exploded. After running out of gasoline, he glided back to his base for a powerless landing. On 29 August, he claimed two P-38s destroyed and two more damaged.

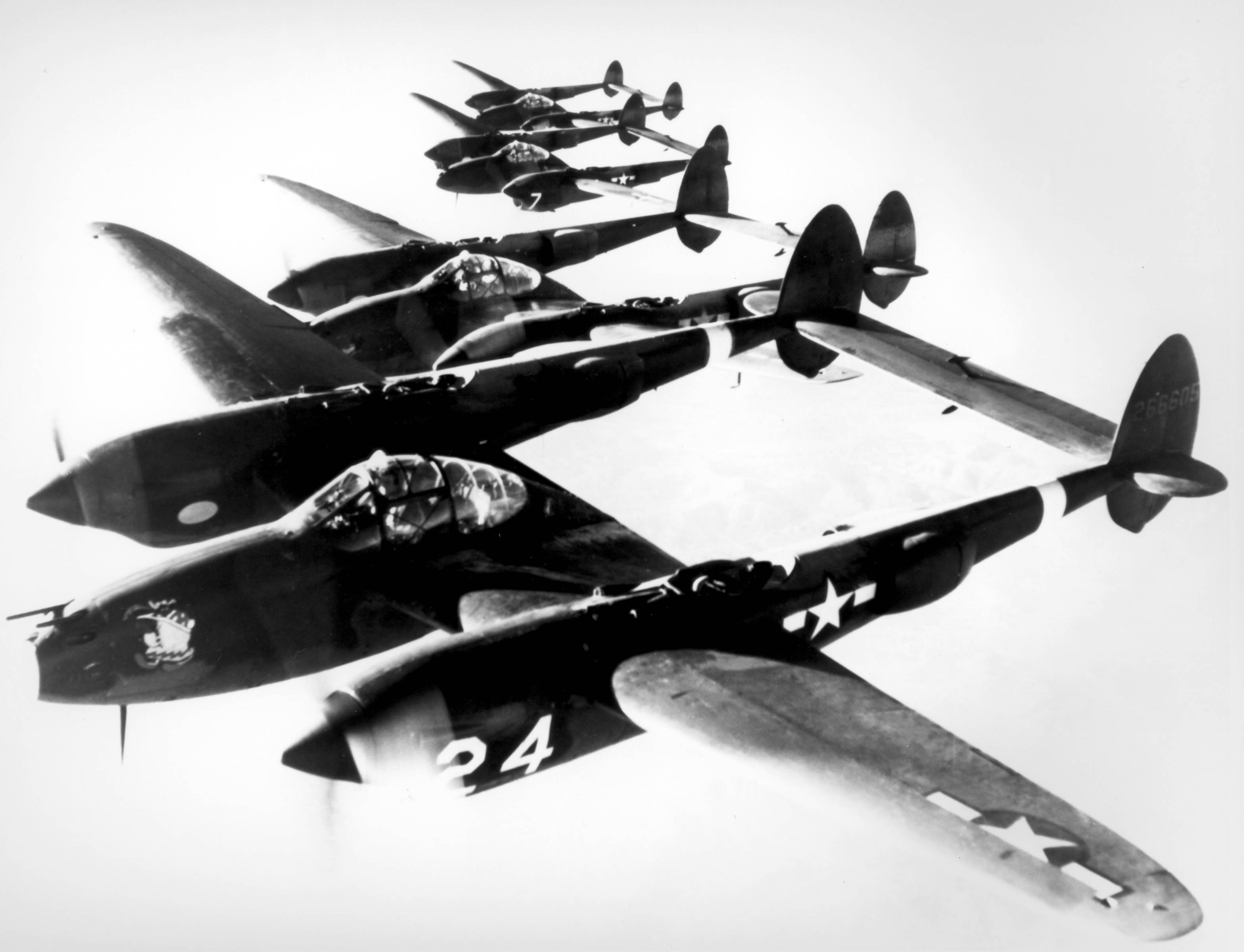
P-38s flying in formation - Gorrini scored several kills against this two-engined fighter, during the Defence of Rome, in summer 1943

On 30 August, Gorrini claimed another B-17 Flying Fortress over Frascati and the same day he was mentioned on Bollettino di Guerra: "Sergente Maggiore Luigi Gorrini da Alseno (Piacenza) of 3° Stormo Caccia has distinguished himself during the aerial battles of the 27th and 29th, during which he has shot down two four-engined bombers and a twin-engined fighter." On 31 August, 85^{a} Squadriglia, with Gorrini in a C.205V, took off from Palidoro airfield (Rome) at 12:00, flying in the direction of Naples to engage enemy bombers. At 8,500 meters the Squadriglia clashed with escorting Spitfires with 85^{a} claiming three Spitfires destroyed and five damaged during this combat. Gorrini shot down one Spitfire (his 15th air victory) and damaged a P-38, but his aircraft was badly hit by machine gun fire and he made a forced landing away from his airfield at 12:50. Gorrini was seriously wounded and hospitalised. He was out of the fighting when Italy surrendered to the Allies on 8 September 1943. During three years of combat service, Gorrini was involved in 132 air battles, was credited with 15 confirmed air victories, was wounded twice, crash-landed once and bailed out once, was mentioned in dispatches several times, and was decorated two times.

== Aeronautica Nazionale Repubblicana ==
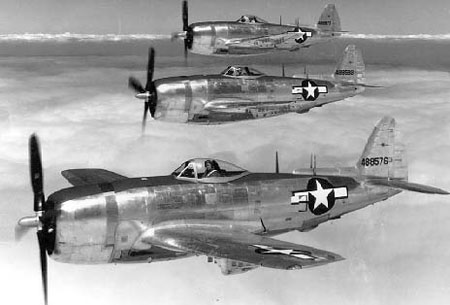
Republic P-47 in formation: under ANR insignia, Gorrini claimed several P-47s before being shot down and wounded in a dogfight with Republic fighters.

On 12 October 1943, Lieutenant Colonel Ernesto Botto, the newly appointed Undersecretary of the New Republican Air Force, appealed over the radio for airmen to enlist. Responding to this, Gorrini rejoined in combat against the Anglo-American forces:

"After flying for three years side by side with the German pilots, on the English Channel, in North Africa, Greece, Egypt, Tunisia and finally over my own homeland, I had made friends with some of them, particularly from JG27… I did not want to hang my coat in the wind, so to speak, and perhaps fire on my German friends. Also, I wanted to protect the northern Italian towns from indiscriminate bombing as much as possible."

On 23 December 1943, Gorrini joined the Italian Aeronautica Nazionale Repubblicana (ANR) where he was assigned to 1^{a} Squadriglia, 1° Gruppo Caccia and continued to fly C.205 fighters. At this time, this unit was under the command of "Ace" Capitano Adriano Visconti and based at Lagnasco airfield (Cuneo). On this day, Gorrini flew in a C.205V at 10:15 and was declared fit for combat. On 30 January 1944, 1 ° Gruppo was scrambled to face a formation of USAF bombers escorted by P-47s. The C.205s intercepted the enemy aircraft off Grado. Gorrini hit one of the Thunderbolts that had attacked sottotenente Re, and shot it down. Then he damaged a B-24 and rushed to intercept American aircraft that had attacked his base in Campoformido. When he arrived, a P-47 was on the tail of a Bf 109 from JG 27, that had intercepted the USAF raid on the Italian air base. Gorrini hit the P-47 that crashed near the airfield. On the following day, he claimed a P-38.

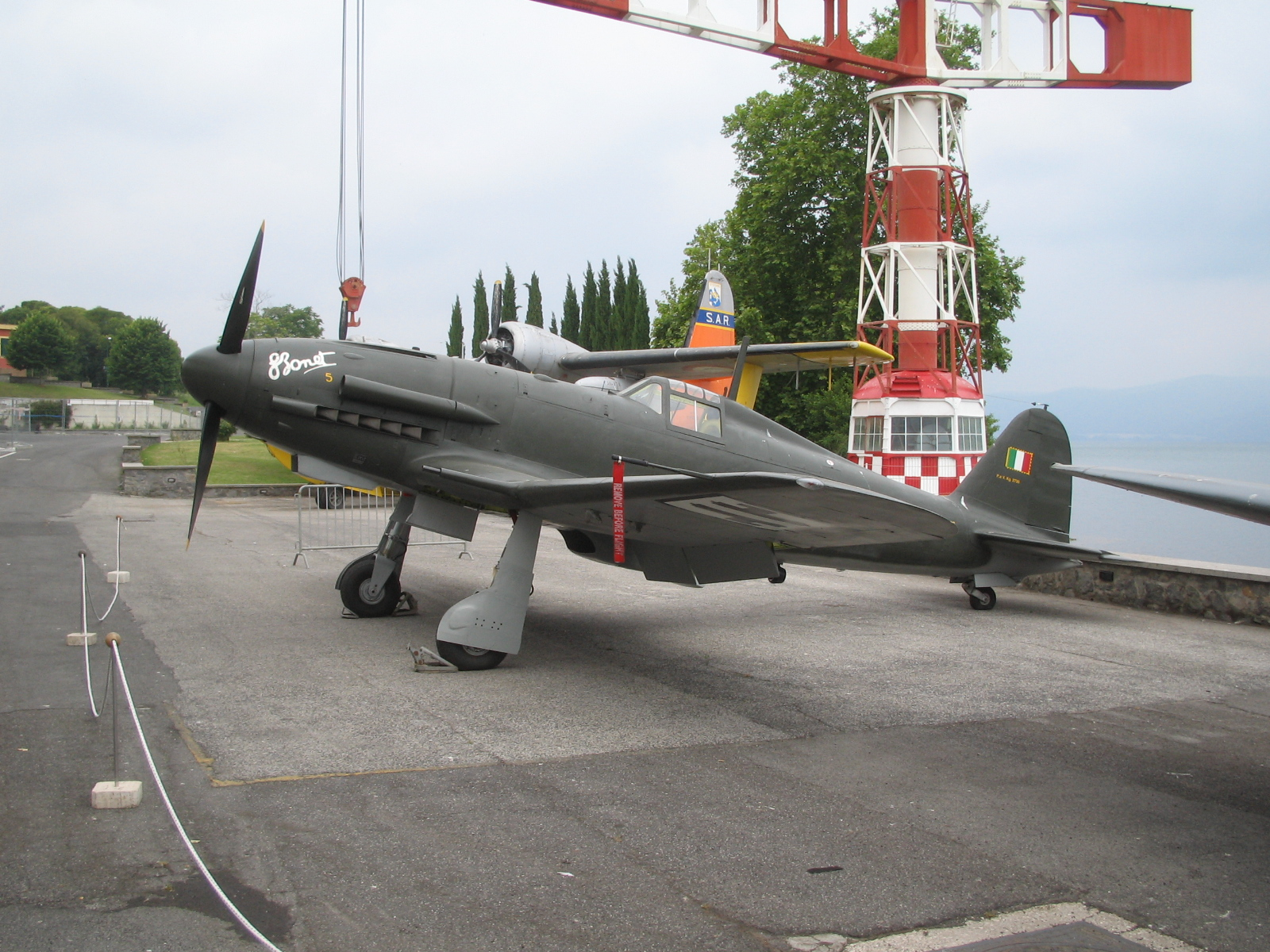
A Fiat G.55 with ANR livery exhibited at the Museo storico dell'Aeronautica Militare di Vigna di Valle. Gorrini flew this outstanding dogfighter under ANR insignia.

A B-17 was claimed on 11 March and another P-47 on 6 April thus reaching 19 victories. On 24 May 1944, sergente maggiore Gorrini achieved his last air victory. He took off with tenente Vittorio Satta, to intercept a formation of B-24 flying between Parma and Fidenza. The two A.N.R. pilots intercepted the American bombers and their escort on Colorno. They selected the two last Liberators and attacked them. Gorrini left his B-24 on fire after his first pass, but two escorting P-47 Thunderbolts bounced his leader and shot him down, killing Lieutenant Satta. On the following day, Gorrini claimed a B-17 damaged. But on 15 June 1944, in the sky of Modena-Reggio, Gorrini fought his last air battle. He suddenly found himself surrounded by four P-47 Thunderbolts. In the ensuing dogfight, his fighter was hit and Gorrini was forced to bail out. He waited to open the parachute until he was close to the ground, fearing to be strafed by the American pilots. However, the harness was too loose and, when he opened it, he suffered a violent jerk and lost consciousness. When he woke up, he was in an infirmary. After being hospitalised, he was sent on leave. During his time with the A.N.R. he flew in combat with the Macchi C.205V and Fiat G.55. Wounded twice, he did not fly again during World War II. He summed up his career, with these words: "212 air combat, 24 solo air victories, 5 parachute jumps."

== Post-War ==
After the war, Gorrini enlisted in the newly formed Italian Air Force (Aeronautica Militare Italiana) but, due to Allied opposition, he was kept in the rank of warrant officer. His last unit was the 50° Stormo. He was promoted Tenente only when he retired. He died on 8 November 2014 in Alseno.

== Awards ==
Gorrini was awarded the Medaglia d'oro al Valor Militare (in 1958), the Bronzo twice and the First and Second Class German Iron Cross. He was also the only A.N.R. pilot to be awarded Italy's highest military award post-war, for accomplishments which took place before the Armistice of 8 September 1943.

== Bibliography ==
- Benzi, Andrea (Interview with Luigi Gorrini). "Storia del XX Secolo N. 33." Febbraio, C.D.L. Edizioni srl, 1998.
- Gustavsson, Håkan. URL "Italy Sergente Maggiore Luigi Gorrini Medaglia d'Oro al Valor Militareconsultato." Biplane fighter aces on Håkan's aviation page. Retrieved: 12 May 2009.
- Haining, Peter. The Chianti Raiders: The Extraordinary Story of the Italian Air Force in the Battle of Britain. London: Robson Books, 2005. ISBN 1861058292
- Lioy, Vincenzo. Gloria senza allori (in Italian). Roma: Associazione Arma Aeronautica, 1953.
- Lazzati, Giulio. Ali nella tragedia (in Italian). Milano: Mursia, 1970.
- Lazzati, Giulio. I soliti Quattro gatti (in Italian). Milano: Mursia, 1965.
- Manfredi, Giacomo: Ali d'Italia. «Vespa 2» La storia di Luigi Gorrini, asso dell'aviazione da caccia Italiana, medaglia d'oro al Valor Militare Editore (in Italian). Modena: S.T.E.M.-MUCCHI, 1978.
- Massimello, Giovanni and Giorgio Apostolo. Italian Aces of World War Two. Oxford: Osprey Publishing, 2000. ISBN 978-1-84176-078-0.
- Neulen, Hans-Werner (February 2001). "Vespa 2: Luigi Gorrini". Avions: Toute l'Aéronautique et son histoire (in French) (95): 29–33. ISSN 1243-8650.
- Neulen, Hans-Werner (March 2001). "Vespa 2: Luigi Gorrini". Avions: Toute l'Aéronautique et son histoire (in French) (96): 17–20. ISSN 1243-8650.
- Neulen, Hans-Werner (April 2001). "Vespa 2: Luigi Gorrini". Avions: Toute l'Aéronautique et son histoire (in French) (97): 37–41. ISSN 1243-8650.
- Neulen, Hans-Werner. In the Skies of Europe. Ramsbury, Marlborough, UK: The Crowood Press, 2000. ISBN 1-86126-799-1.
- Pagliano, Franco. Aviatori Italiani (in Italian). Milano: Longanesi, 1969.
- Paravicini, Pier Paolo. Pilota da caccia 1942-1945(in Italian). Milano: Mursia, 2007. ISBN 8842536768
- Pesce, Giuseppe and Giovanni Massimello. Adriano Visconti Asso di guerra (in Italian). Parma: Albertelli editore s.r.l., 1997. ISBN 8885909809
- Sgarlato, Nico. C.202 Lo chiamavano il Macchi (in Italian). Parma: Delta Editrice, 2008.
- Sgarlato, Nico. "Macchi Folgore" (in Italian). Aerei Nella Storia 1998 (8): 8-20. Parma, Italy: West-Ward sas.
- Shores, Christopher. Air Aces. Greenwich, CT: Bison Books, 1983. ISBN 0-86124-104-5.
