= Fiat G.55 Centauro =

Italian single-engine fighter aircraft

G.55 Centauro
- The second prototype G.55, MM 492, in Regia Aeronautica markings

General information
- Type: Fighter
- National origin: Italy
- Manufacturer: Fiat Aviazione
- Designer: Giuseppe Gabrielli
- Status: Retired
- Primary users: Regia Aeronautica Aeronautica Nazionale Repubblicana; Argentine Air Force; Royal Egyptian Air Force

History
- Manufactured: 274 (wartime), 75 (postwar)
- Introduction date: 1943
- First flight: 30 April 1942
- Retired: 1950s

The Fiat G.55 Centauro (Italian: "Centaur") is a single-engine single-seat monoplane fighter aircraft designed and produced by the Italian aircraft manufacturer Fiat Aviazione. It was operated by both the Regia Aeronautica and the Aeronautica Nazionale Repubblicana during the latter half of the Second World War.

The G.55 was developed and produced at Fiat's Turin facility. A key feature was its use of a inline engine (a license-built copy of the German Daimler-Benz DB 605 engine) instead of the traditionally favoured radial engine. It was armed with varying combinations of 20 mm MG 151/20 cannon and 12.7 mm (.5 in) Breda-SAFAT machine guns. The resulting fighter was relatively powerful, quick, and robust. The prototype G.55 made its maiden flight on 30 April 1942; after proving itself during competitive trials, the fighter entered quantity production and squadron service during the following year.

Being only active during the latter portion of the conflict, the majority of its operational service came after the Armistice of 8 September 1943 and thus was principally operated by the Repubblica Sociale Italiana. Wartime efforts to further develop the G.55 included the G.56, which was powered by the larger and more powerful German Daimler-Benz DB 603 engine; however, the G.56 variant is not believed to have ever been produced in quantity. Following the end of the conflict, Fiat opted to reestablish production of the G.55; in addition to its domestic use, postwar export sales were made to the Argentine Air Force and the Royal Egyptian Air Force. In this manner, examples were still being flown into the 1950s. Additionally, a dedicated trainer version, the G.59, was developed, powered by imported Rolls-Royce Merlin engines.

While Italian fighter pilots typically appreciated the Centauro, by the end of the conflict fewer than 300 aircraft had been completed. By comparison, the Germans produced 35,000 Bf 109s. Despite only being available in limited numbers, the G.55 proved itself to be an excellent high altitude interceptor over Northern Italy. During 1944, the Centauro routinely clashed with Allied Supermarine Spitfire, P-51 Mustang, P-47 Thunderbolt and P-38 Lightning, proving to be no easy adversary. The G.55 has been claimed to be the best aircraft produced in Italy during the Second World War (a subjective claim also frequently made for the Macchi C.205 Veltro as well as for the Reggiane Re.2005 Sagittario). During 1943, after comparative tests against the Messerschmitt Bf 109G and the Focke-Wulf Fw 190, Luftwaffe officials declared that the Fiat G.55 was "the best Axis fighter" available at that time.

== Design and development ==
=== Background ===
Throughout the 1930s, the Italian military authorities chose to use only radial engines to power their aircraft. Consequently, during the second half of the 1930s, the Italian aeronautical industry had been sufficiently de-incentivised to the point of completely avoiding the development of more powerful engines based on streamlined liquid-cooled designs, which would become popular abroad. However, by 1939, all the main Italian aircraft factories had begun designing a new series of monoplane fighter aircraft, using inline engines as opposed to the radial engines that powered the first generation Italian monoplane fighters used in the early years of the Second World War (fighters such as the Fiat G.50 Freccia and the Macchi C.200 Saetta). This process saw the first-generation radial-engined fighters re-equipped with the Italian-built copy of the Daimler-Benz DB 601 engine, the so-called Serie 1/2, whose most prominent representative was the Macchi C.202 Folgore. This was an aerodynamically revised Macchi C.200- also known as Macchi C.201 with a V-12 instead of a radial engine. Aircraft in this series were given alphanumeric designations ending in the number "2".

This re-engining initiative had quickly proved to be beneficial, and so various Italian figures were keen to continue exploring this direction. Accordingly, during 1941, designers shifted their attention on the new, larger and more powerful Fiat RA.1050, a license-built copy of Germany's Daimler-Benz DB 605 engine. Aircraft powered by this new engine became the "Serie 5", and all had alphanumeric designations ending in the number "5" (Macchi C.205, Reggiane Re.2005, Fiat G.55). Fiat designer Giuseppe Gabrielli, while experimenting a new version of his Fiat G.50 fighter, equipped with the DB 601, started a new design that was to be powered by the DB 605.

=== Into flight ===
The first G.55 prototype flew on 30 April 1942, piloted by commander Valentino Cus, immediately showing its good performance and flight characteristics. It was armed with one 20 mm MG 151/20 cannon with 200 rounds of ammunition, installed between the cylinder banks and firing through the propeller hub. In "Sottoserie 0" airframes, there were also four 12.7 mm (.5 in) Breda-SAFAT machine guns; two in the upper engine cowling, and two in the lower cowling, firing through the propeller arc, with 300 rpg. This layout soon proved to be troublesome, both for rearming and for the servicing of the lower cowling mounted machine guns. For this reason, the two lower machine guns were removed, and replaced with a 20 mm MG 151/20 in each wing, in the later production series, the Serie 1 (for a total of three cannon and two 12.7mm machine guns, although this varied; some had machine guns in the wings instead of cannon).

The prototype was flown to Guidonia, where it was put into trials against the other fighters of the so-called Serie 5: Macchi C.205V Veltro and the formidable Reggiane Re.2005 Sagittario, all of them using the powerful, license-built Daimler-Benz DB 605 engine. The trials showed that the Centauro was the second best performer overall, and it won the tender set by the Regia Aeronautica. The C.205V was good at low and medium altitudes, fast and with good diving characteristics but its performance dropped considerably over 8,000 m (26,250 ft), particularly in handling. The Re.2005 was the fastest at high altitudes and best in dogfights, but suffered from vibration which turned out to be a balance problem. This was corrected, but the 2005 was still the most technically advanced, intricate, and therefore time-consuming of the three to produce, which made it unattractive at that stage of the war. The G.55 was chosen for mass production, along with the C.205. The G.55 prototype reached 620 km/h (390 mph), fully loaded, and without using WEP (war emergency power), at 7,000 m (22,970 ft). This was a little less than expected, but it had a strong airframe and was the best aircraft regarding handling and stability at every altitude. The only negative assessment noted by G.55 pilots was pronounced left-hand yawing at takeoff due to the powerful engine torque. This was partially remedied by a slight offset positioning of the vertical stabilizer to counteract the torque.

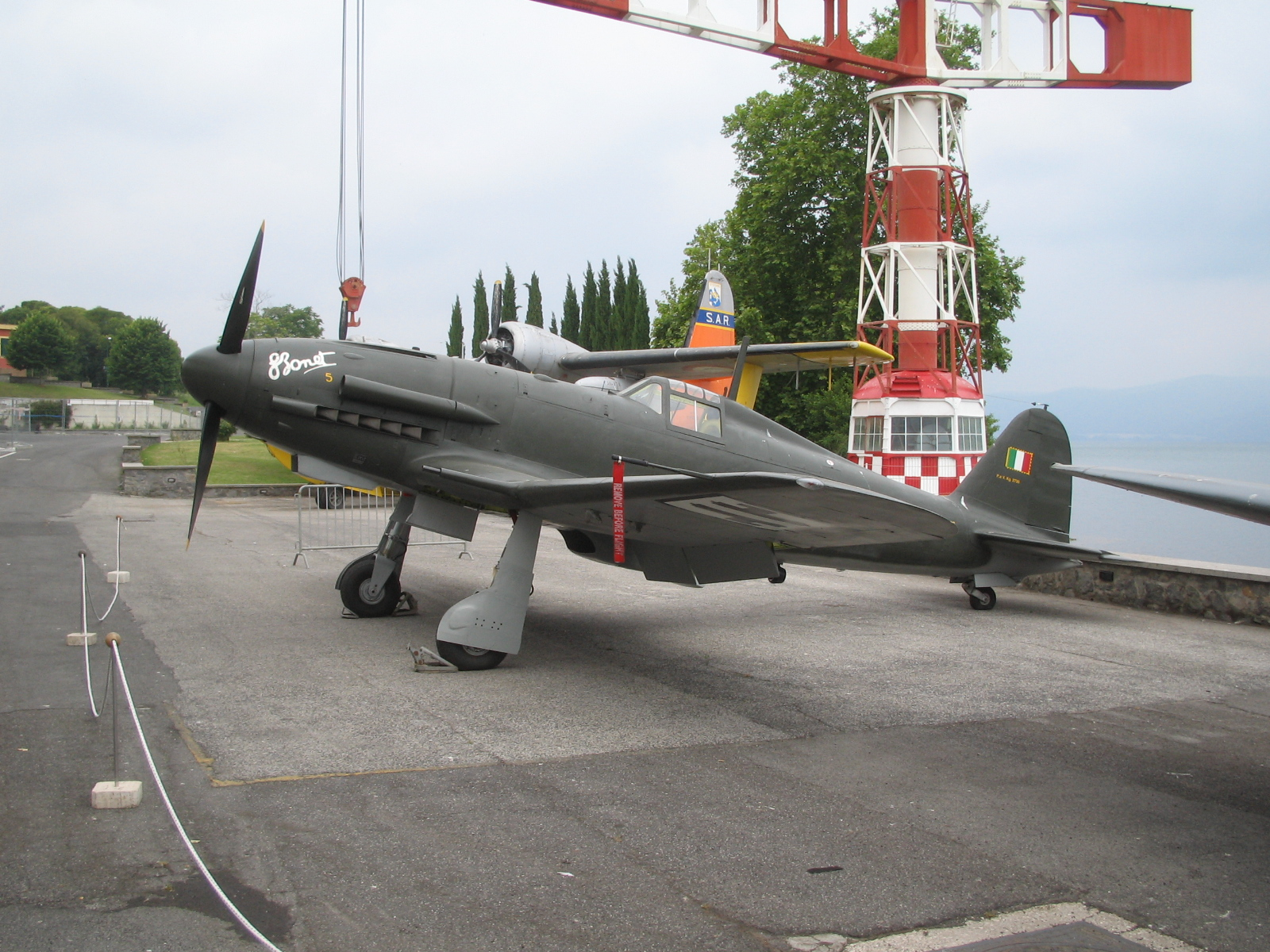
A Fiat G.55 with ANR livery exhibited at the Museo storico dell'Aeronautica Militare di Vigna di Valle, on Bracciano lake, in Lazio region.

By early 1943, increased Allied bombing raids over Italy had shown that there was no suitable high-altitude fighter to deal with them effectively. The Macchi C.202's performance decreased above 8,000 m (26,250 ft), the typical altitude of the bombers, and its light armament of two 12.7 mm (.5 in) and two 7.7mm (.31 in) machine guns was hardly adequate to bring down heavy bombers. Of the Serie 5 fighters, the Centauro showed the best high-altitude performance, due to its large wing surface area. Also its powerful armament, along with the generous ammunition supply (the G.55 had 250 rounds of 20 mm ammunition in the centerline cannon as opposed to 120 rounds in the Re.2005) standardized in the production Serie I, was sufficient to bring down US heavy bombers.

=== Production ===
The Regia Aeronautica commissioned the production of 1,800 G.55s, later raising that number to 2,400. A pre-production series of 34 examples was ordered: these aircraft were mostly based on the prototype, with minor changes to improve its flying characteristics. They had a different weapon layout, as stated above, with the two lower cowling machine guns moved into the wings. Only 19 of the 34 commissioned aircraft were built, and six of them were converted to the Serie I standard at the factory.

The production version, named Serie I, had the standard armament of three 20 mm MG 151/20s and two 12.7 mm (.5 in) Breda-SAFAT machine guns, plus two underwing hardpoints, allowing it to carry either two bombs (up to 160 kg/350 lb), or two drop tanks (100 L/26 US Gal). At the date of the Armistice, 8 September 1943, 35 G.55s of all Series had been delivered, including three prototypes. Of these, only one was flown to South Italy to join the Italian Co-Belligerent Air Force (a second G.55, MM.91150, was obtained by the Allies in summer 1944, when test pilot, Serafino Agostini, defected with an escaped British POW, an RAF officer, sitting on his knees. The aircraft was then taken on charge by the RAF and transferred to the Central Fighter Establishment of Tangmere, Great Britain, on 17 March 1945, with the identification number VF204 applied, was put in the depot at Ford; its final fate is unrecorded.)

From that date on, the Centauro served with the Aeronautica Nazionale Repubblicana (ANR), the air force of the new fascist state created in North Italy by Mussolini, with the assistance of the Germans. It still not exactly known how many "Centauros" were eventually requisitioned by the Luftwaffe or those acquired by ANR. About 18 aircraft were expropriated by the ANR while 12–20 (possibly as many as 42, according to some official reports) were requisitioned by the Germans.

The Fiat factory, in Turin under German control, continued production for about six months. On 25 April 1944, Fiat factories were heavily bombed: 15 G.55s were destroyed, as well as some trimotor Fiat G.12 transports, BR.20 bombers, and CR.42LW biplane fighters ordered by the Luftwaffe. 164 "Centauros" had been completed, 97 of them being produced after the Armistice and delivered to the ANR. Following the advice of Rüstungs und Kriegsproduktion Stab (RuK), the German Control Commission, production was dispersed in small cities of Monferrato and production of parts were assigned to CANSA of Novara and AVIA in Vercelli. The parts were then assembled in Turin where the aircraft were to be flown by test pilots Valentino Cus, Rolandi, Agostini and Catella. Production slowed markedly, and was stopped by the German authorities in September 1944. A total of 148 G.55s were delivered to the ANR and, when the factory was captured, 37 more examples were ready, while 73 were still on the production line, in various degrees of completion.

== Operational history ==
The first Centauro to see operational use was the third prototype. On 21 March 1943, it was assigned to 20° Gruppo (squadron), 51° Stormo (wing) CT, based at Roma-Ciampino, for operational evaluation. In May, the unit transferred to Capoterra, near Cagliari having its baptism of fire on 5 June 1943 against Allied aircraft attacking Sardinia. The two first pre-production series flew, respectively, on 10 April and in May 1943. In early June they were assigned to 353^{a} Squadriglia (flight) CT based in Foligno, Umbria, were, until August, were transferred nine more aircraft. Pilots were delighted when they began to receive the new fighter in summer 1943.

In June, the first Serie I were assigned to Gruppo Complementare of 51° Stormo in Foligno, near Perugia, but in July the 11 G.55 of Gruppo Complementare were transferred to 353a Squadriglia, that already had in charge the "pre-series" machines, to operate from Roma-Ciampino Sud airfield. The 353a Squadriglia, commanded by Capitano Egeo Pittoni, flew many missions against the American bomber formations, but the flights were stopped when Rome was declared "Città aperta" (open city). On 27 August, the Squadriglie 351a and 352a left Sardinia and arrived in Foligno to be re-equipped with G.55. But at the date of the 8 September the G.55 had not been delivered yet. During the first week of September, 12 Centauros had been assigned to 372a Squadriglia of 153° Gruppo in Torino-Mirafiori. On 8 September 1943, the date of Armistice, the Regia Aeronautica had received 35 G.55s. Only one of them flew to southern Italy, accepting the invitation of Maresciallo d'Italia Pietro Badoglio to surrender to Allied forces.

=== Service with the Aeronautica Nazionale Repubblicana ===
There is no exact information about the G.55's captured by the Luftwaffe or acquired by Aeronautica Nazionale Repubblicana. About 18 G.55s were acquired by ANR while 12–20, or even 42, according to some reports, were requisitioned by the Luftwaffe. The Centauro entered in service with the ANR; a decision was made to produce 500 G.55s, of which 300 were G.55/I and 200 G.55/II Serie II, armed with five 20 mm MG 151/20s and no machine guns (one in the centerline, two in the upper cowling, two in the wings). Only 148 were delivered to the ANR units that, as the number of available G.55s dwindled, were progressively re-equipped with the Bf 109G, of various sub-versions, even though Italian pilots preferred the G.55, with cancellation of production being extremely unpopular.

The ANR had two Gruppi Caccia terrestre (fighter squadrons), the first was initially equipped with the Macchi C.205, from November 1943 to May 1944, then, re-equipped with the G.55/I in June 1944 until it switched to the Bf 109G starting from November 1944. The 2nd Gruppo was the main unit equipped with the G.55, of which it had 70 examples from December 1943 – August 1944, before being progressively re-equipped with the Bf 109G.

The first unit in ANR to be equipped with G.55 was the Squadriglia Montefusco, in November 1943, operating from Piemonte until 29 March 1944, when it was absorbed by the 1st Gruppo and transferred in Veneto. The 2nd Gruppo was formed at Bresso. It was initially commanded by Lt Col Antonio Vizzoto, and later by Lt Col Aldo Alessandrini. It had three Squadriglie (the 4th, Gigi Tre Osei, the 5th, Diavoli Rossi, and the 6th, Gamba di Ferro). The unit operated near Milan and Varese until April 1944, then it was transferred near Parma and Pavia, then again near the Lake Garda (Brescia and Verona). At the end of May, the 2° Gruppo gave its G.55s to 1° Gruppo and re-equipped with 46 ex I./JG 53 and II./JG 77 Bf 109G-6/R6

With the ANR, the G.55s gave a good account of themselves against Allied fighters, including the Spitfire and Mustang.

=== German interest ===
In December 1942, a technical commission of the Regia Aeronautica was invited by the Luftwaffe to test some German aircraft in Rechlin. The visit was part of a joint plan for the standardization of Axis aircraft production. In the same time, some Luftwaffe officers visited Guidonia, where they were particularly interested in the performance promised by the Serie 5 fighters. On 9 December, these impressions were discussed in a Luftwaffe staff meeting and raised the interest of Hermann Göring himself. In February 1943, a German test commission was sent to Italy to evaluate the new Italian fighters. The commission was led by Oberst Petersen; it was formed by Luftwaffe officers, pilots and by technical personnel, among them Flugbaumeister Malz. The Germans also brought with them several aircraft, including a Fw 190 A-5 and a Bf 109 G-4 for direct comparison tests in simulated dogfights.

The tests began on 20 February 1943. The German commission very impressed by the Italian aircraft, the G.55 in particular. In general, all the Serie 5 fighters were very good at low altitudes, but the G.55 was also competitive with its German opponents in term of speed and climb rate at high altitudes, while still maintaining superior handling characteristics. The definitive evaluation by the German commission was "excellent" for the G.55, "excellent" for the Re.2005 although very complicated to produce, and merely "average" for the C.205. Oberst Petersen defined the G.55 "the best fighter in the Axis" and immediately telegraphed his impressions to Göring. After listening to the recommendations of Petersen, Milch and Galland, a meeting held by Göring on 22 February 1943 voted to produce the G.55 in Germany.

German interest, apart from the good test results, derived also from the development possibilities they were able to see both in the G.55 and the Re.2005. Particularly, the G.55 was bigger and heavier and was considered a very good candidate for the new, significantly larger and more powerful DB 603 engine, which was considered too large to fit in the Bf 109's airframe. Other visits were organized in Germany during March and May 1943 in Rechlin and Berlin. The G.55 was again tested at Rechlin at the presence of Milch. Gabrielli and other FIAT personnel were invited to visit German factories and to discuss the evolution of the aircraft. The specifications of the German G55/II included the DB 603 engine, five 20 mm guns and a pressurized cockpit. The suggestion of weapons in the wings, limited to one 20 mm gun for each wing, originated the final configuration of the Serie I, while the DB 603 engine was successfully installed in what became the G.56 prototype. As a concrete expression of the German interest in the G.55, the Luftwaffe acquired three complete G.55/0 airframes (MM 91064-65-66) for evaluations and experiments providing three DB 603 engines and original machinery for the setup of other production line of the Italian copy of DB 605. Two of the Luftwaffe G.55's remained in Turin, at the Aeritalia plants, where they were used by German and Italian engineers to study the planned modifications and the possible optimizations to the production process. Later these two were converted to Serie I and delivered to the ANR. The third one was transferred to Rechlin for tests and experiments in Germany. The DB 603 engines were used to build the G.56 prototypes.

The interest in the G.55 program was still high after the Armistice. In October 1943, Kurt Tank, who previously personally tested a G.55 in Rechlin, and who had had nothing but praise for the aircraft, was in Turin to discuss G.55 production. However, events in the war (including intention efforts by the Allies to bomb Italian aircraft factories) and the not yet optimized production process were the reasons for which the G.55 program was eventually abandoned by the Luftwaffe. Early production of G.55 required about 15,000 man-hours; while there were estimates to reduce the effort to about 9,000 man-hours, the well-practiced German factories were able to assemble a Bf 109 in only 5,000 man-hours. The DB 603 were instead to be used in Tank's own Focke-Wulf Ta 152C.

=== Torpedo fighter ===
G.55 S prototype c. 1945

The Regia Aeronautica frequently used torpedo bombers to air-launch torpedoes, such as the trimotor SIAI-Marchetti SM.79 Sparviero medium bomber. These had some success in the early war years, inflicting considerable losses on Allied shipping in the Mediterranean. By late 1942 the ageing Sparviero was facing continually improving Allied fighters and anti aircraft defences, leading to the Italian general staff exploring the idea of using well-powered, single-engined heavy fighters to deliver torpedoes – a concept known later as the "torpedo fighter". Such aircraft, based near the Italian coast, could potentially have an operational range of 300–400 km (190–250 mi), would be capable of carrying a 680 kg (1,500 lb) torpedo (a shorter and more compact version of a weapon carried by the SM.79) at relatively high speed, and would also be better able to evade enemy fighters and/or combat them on equal terms.

While some consideration was given to adapting the G.55, Fiat began designing the G.57, a separate design powered by the 930 kW (1,250 hp) Fiat A.83 R.C.24/52 radial engine that was more capable of carrying a torpedo. Later, after the G.57 project was dropped, and given the ANR's continuing need for an aircraft that could replace the SM.79, the ANR engineers undertook the task of converting the Centauro for the torpedo attack role.

A production G.55 (military serial number MM. 91086) was modified to carry a 920 kg (2,030 lb), 5.46 m (17.91 ft) long torpedo. The engine coolant radiator, normally a single unit positioned on the belly of the fuselage under the cockpit area, was divided into two units mounted under the wing roots (similar to the layout used on the Bf 109), gaining a 90 cm (35 in) space where two racks were mounted to carry the torpedo. The tailwheel strut was lengthened and equipped with a strengthened shock absorber to keep the tailfins of the torpedo from striking the ground, and a drag-reducing cowling was added in front of the tailwheel to minimize drag from the lengthened strut. The G.55/S shared the same gun layout as the G.55/I, with the three MG 151/20s and the two Breda-SAFAT machine guns.

The aircraft, designated G.55/S, first flew in August 1944 and was successfully tested in January 1945, piloted by Adriano Mantelli. Despite the cumbersome external load, performance was good and the handling acceptable. The ANR ordered a pre-series of 10 examples and a production series of 100 aircraft, but the conclusion of the war put an end to the project. The G.55/S prototype survived the war and, after being converted back to the Serie I standard, it became the first G.55 to be delivered to the newly formed Aeronautica Militare Italiana (AMI).

=== Fiat G.56 ===
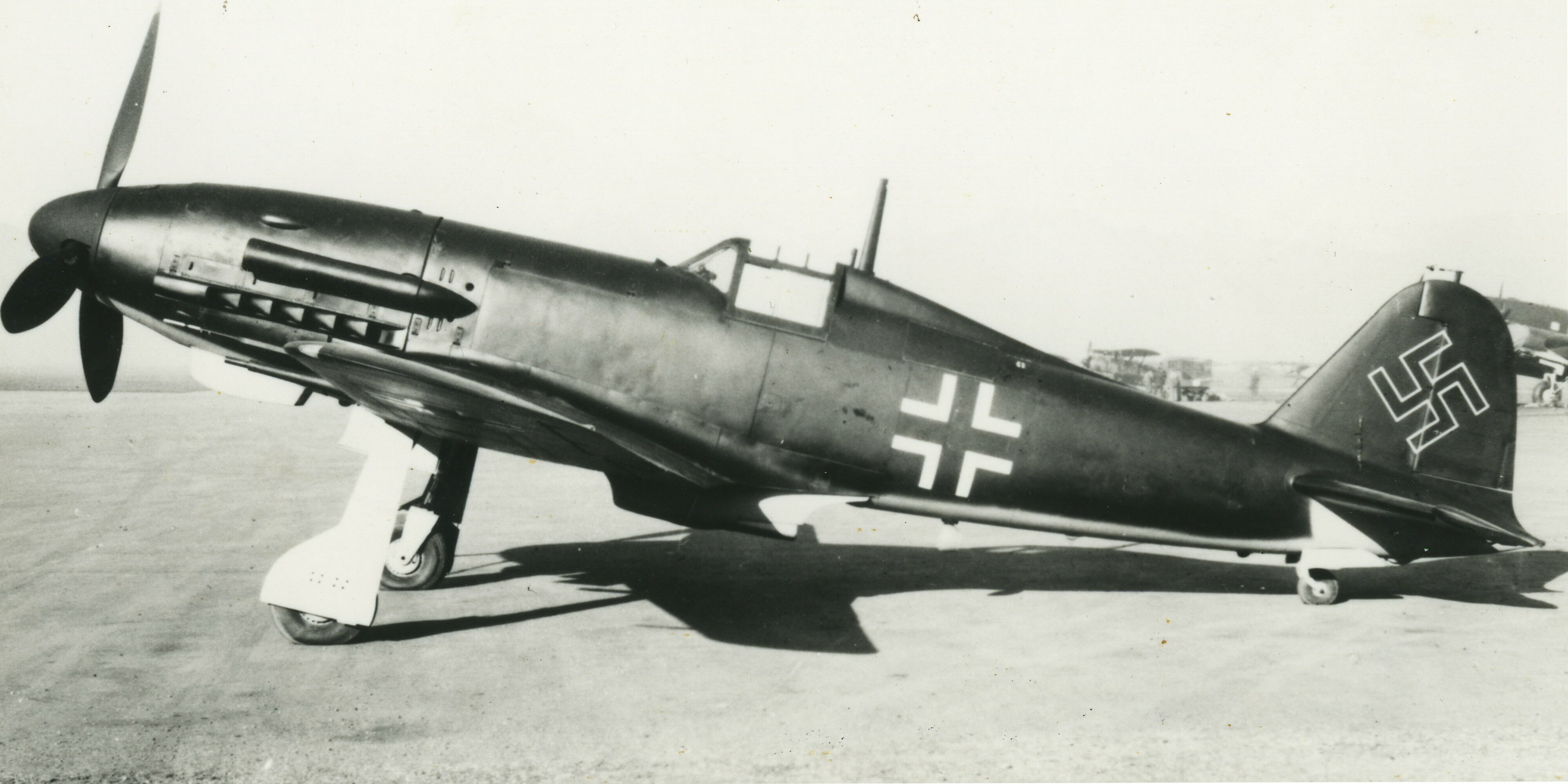
Fiat G.56

The Fiat G.56 was essentially a Fiat G.55 with a larger German Daimler-Benz DB 603 engine. A pair of prototypes were built and flight testing commenced in March 1944. On 30 March of that year, Commander Valentino Cus reached speeds of 690/700 km/h (430/440 mph). The aircraft's official maximum speed was 685 km/h (426 mph). It was armed with three 20 mm MG 151/20 cannon, one firing through the propeller hub while the other two were installed in the wings. It reportedly possessed excellent performance and proved to be superior to both the Bf 109K and Bf 109G and Fw 190A, being capable of outmaneuvering all types during testing. Production of the G.56, however, was not allowed by the German authorities.

=== Postwar service ===
During 1946, Fiat restarted production of the G.55, making use of the large stock of partly complete airframes and components remaining in its factories. It was available in two versions, the G.55A, a single-seat fighter/advanced trainer, and the G.55B, a two-seat advanced trainer, whose prototypes flew on 5 September 1946 and 12 February 1946 respectively.

The AMI acquired 19 G.55As and 10 G.55Bs, while the Argentine Air Force purchased 30 G.55As, and 15 G.55Bs. In September 1951, units of the Argentine Navy and Army attempted a military coup against the government of Juan Perón. The G.55s and the sole Argentine G.59 of Grupo 2 de Caza of the Argentine Air Force attempted to defect to the rebel forces, flying to the Punta Indio Naval Air Base. The pilots were arrested on arrival and the aircraft immobilised, however, and took no further part in the revolt, which was defeated by Loyalist forces.

=== G.59 ===
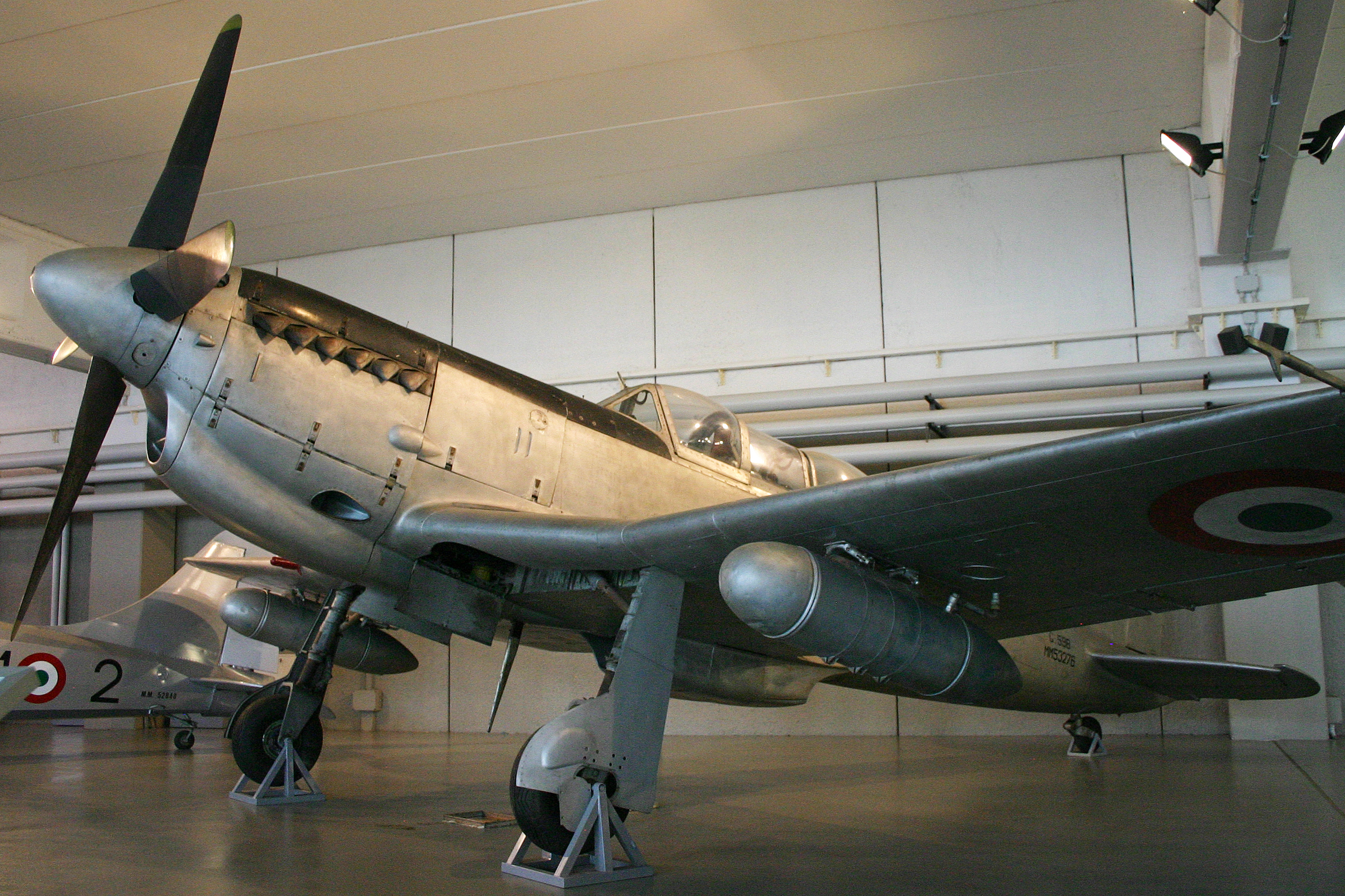
Fiat G.59

The production of these orders for G.55s for Italy and Argentina caused the available stocks of the Italian licence-built version of the DB 605 engine to run short. As there was still a demand for the aircraft, it was decided to convert the type to use the more readily available Rolls-Royce Merlin engine, with the first conversion flying in early 1948. The conversion was successful, and the AMI decided to convert its G.55s to Merlin power, these re-entering service at the Lecce flying school in 1950 as the G.59-1A and G.59-1B (single- and two-seat versions). The AMI continued operating the G.59 until 1964.

Syria placed an order for 30 similar aircraft, which by this time, were completely from new production as the stocks of G.55 components had been exhausted. Of these, 26 were single-seaters (designated G.59-2A) and the remaining 4 two-seaters (G.59-2B). A single G.59-2A was acquired by Argentina for evaluation, but no further orders followed from the South American republic. The final versions were the G.59-4A single-seater and G.59-4B two-seater, which were fitted with bubble canopies for improved visibility. 20 G.59-4As and ten G.59-4Bs were produced by Italy.

== Variants ==
G.55
3 prototypes.
G.55/0
16 pre-production aircraft.
G.55/1
Initial production aircraft.
G.55/2
Bomber interceptor version.
G.55/S
Torpedo attack aircraft variant. S for silurante meaning torpedo.
G.55/A,B
Single-seat/twin-seat trainer versions, developed after the conflict.
G.56
2 prototypes with 1,300 kW (1,750 hp) Daimler-Benz DB 603A engines.
G.57
Version planned with A 930 kW (1,250 hp) Fiat A.83 R.C.24/52 radial engine.
G.59-1A
Rolls-Royce Merlin powered single-seat advanced trainers converted from G.55s
G.59-1B
Rolls-Royce Merlin powered two-seat trainers converted from G.55s
G.59-2A
26, new production, Rolls-Royce Merlin powered single-seaters for Syria
G.59-2B
4, new production, Rolls-Royce Merlin powered two-seat trainers for Syria
G.59-4A
20, new production, Rolls-Royce Merlin powered single-seaters for the Aeronautica Militare Italiana, fitted with bubble canopies.
G.59-4B
10, new production, Rolls-Royce Merlin powered two-seaters for the Aeronautica Militare Italiana, fitted with bubble canopies.

== Operators ==
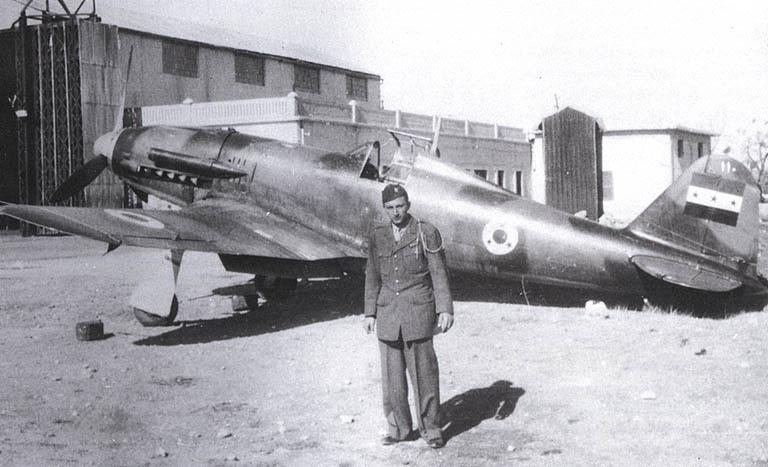
Syrian Fiat G.55

Argentina

- Argentine Air Force

Egypt

- Royal Egyptian Air Force

Kingdom of Italy

- Regia Aeronautica

Italian Social Republic

- Aeronautica Nazionale Repubblicana

Italy

- Italian Air Force operated 74 Fiat G.59 retired in 1965

Syria

- Syrian Air Force

== Surviving aircraft ==
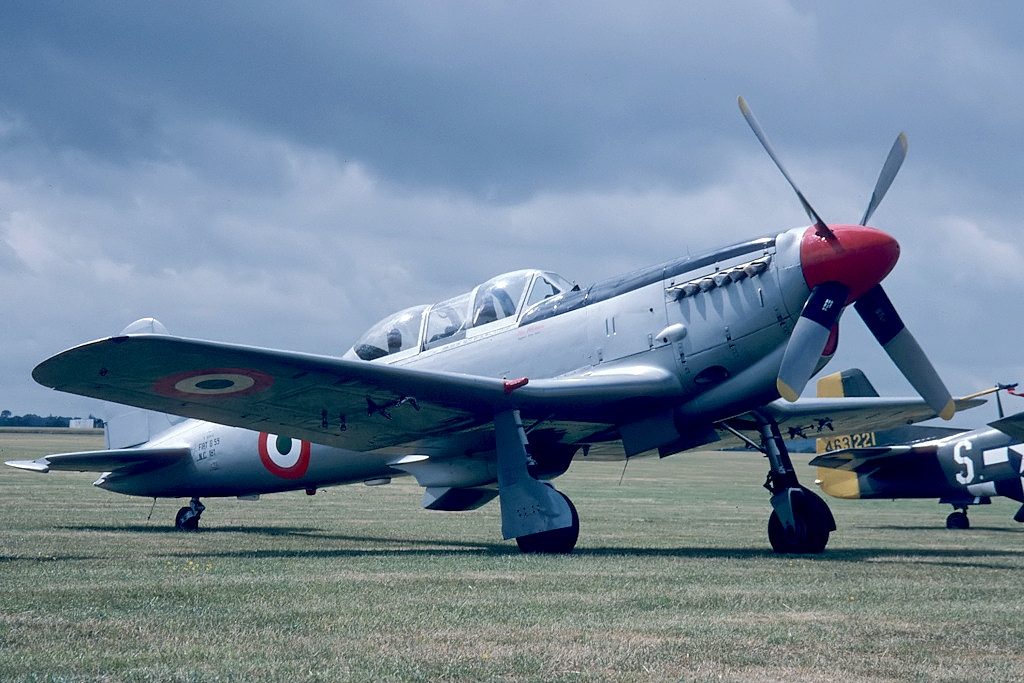
MM53774 at Duxford in 1995

No G.55s survive, but a G.59-2A, MM53265, was converted to resemble one and is on display at the Italian Air Force Museum in Vigna di Valle, Lazio.

Several other G.59s have survived in their postwar configuration, including:

- MM53136 – G.59-2B on static display at the Lonate Pozzolo War Memorial in Varese, Lombardy. It is displayed in wrecked condition.
- MM53276 – G.59-4B on static display at the Italian Air Force Museum in Vigna di Valle, Lazio.
- MM53278 – G.59-4B airworthy with private owner in Hartheim am Rhein, Baden-Württemberg.
- MM53525 – G.59-A in storage at the Italian Air Force Museum in Vigna di Valle, Lazio.
- MM53526 – G.59-4B in storage at the Italian Air Force Museum in Vigna di Valle, Lazio.
- MM53530 – G.59-4B on static display at the Museum of Engines and Mechanisms in Palermo.
- MM53774 – G.59-4B airworthy with Nucleo Aereo Acrobatico Parmense in Parma, Emilia-Romagna.
- MM53778 – G.59-4B under restoration for the Military Aviation Museum in Virginia Beach, Virginia.

== Specifications (G.55/I) ==
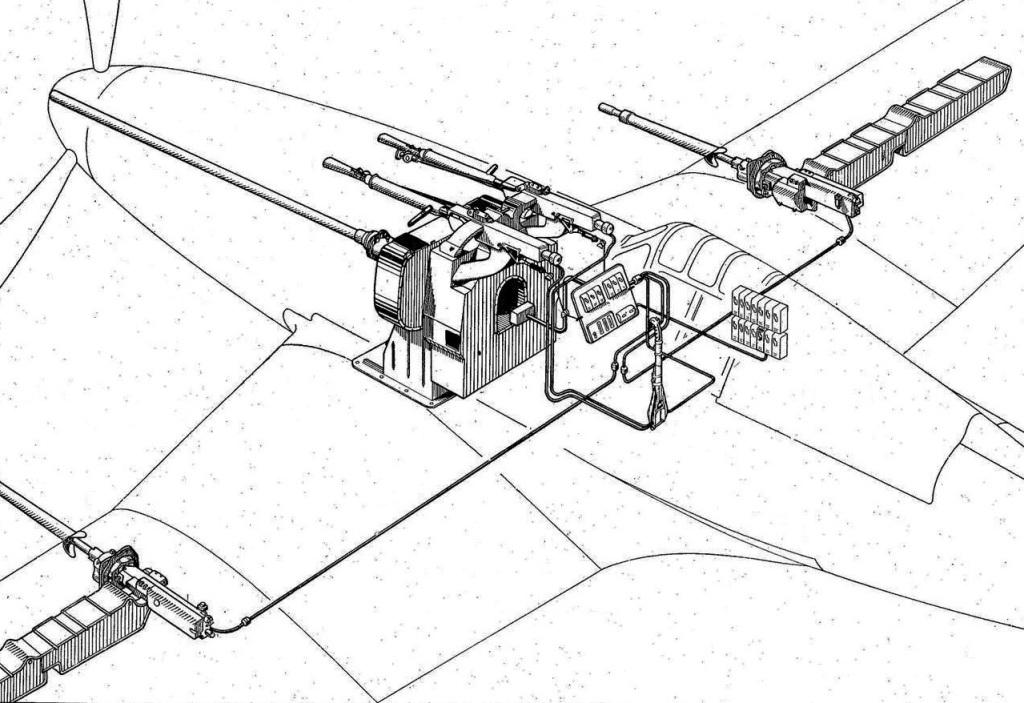
Diagram focused on the armament of the G.55

Data from Centauro – The Final Fling

General characteristics

- Crew: One
- Length: 9.37 m (30 ft 9 in)
- Wingspan: 11.85 m (38 ft 11 in)
- Height: 3.13 m (10 ft 3 in) excluding radio antenna mast
- Wing area: 21.11 m^{2} (227.2 sq ft)
- Airfoil: root: NACA 2415; tip: NACA 2409
- Empty weight: 2,630 kg (5,798 lb)
- Gross weight: 3,520 kg (7,760 lb)
- Max takeoff weight: 3,718 kg (8,197 lb)
- Powerplant: 1 × Fiat RA.1050 R.C.58 Tifone V-12 inverted liquid-cooled piston engine, 1,085 kW (1,455 hp) (license-built Daimler-Benz DB 605A-1)
- Propellers: 3-bladed constant-speed propeller

Performance

- Maximum speed: 623 km/h (387 mph, 336 kn)
- Range: 1,200 km (750 mi, 650 nmi)
- Ferry range: 1,650 km (1,030 mi, 890 nmi) with 2 x 100 L (26 US gal; 22 imp gal) drop-tanks
- Service ceiling: 12,750 m (41,800 ft)
- Time to altitude:

- 6,000 m (20,000 ft) in five minutes and 50 seconds
- 7,000 m (23,000 ft) in eight minutes and 34 seconds

- Wing loading: 154 kg/m^{2} (32 lb/sq ft)
- Power/mass: 0.308 kW/kg (0.187 hp/lb)

Armament
G.55 Serie 0:

- 1 × 20 mm (0.79 in) Mauser MG 151/20 cannon, engine-mounted (250 rounds)
- 4 × 12.7 mm (0.5 in) Breda-SAFAT machine guns, two in the upper engine cowling, two in the lower cowling/wing roots (300 rpg)

G.55 Serie I:

- 3 × 20 mm (0.79 in) MG 151/20s, one engine-mounted (250 rounds) and two wing-mounted (200 rpg)
- 2 × 12.7 mm (0.5 in) Breda-SAFAT machine guns in the upper engine cowling (300 rpg)
- Provision for 2 × 160 kg (350 lb) bombs on underwing racks (N.B. Egyptian and Syrian aircraft used machine guns in the wings instead of cannon)

G.56 :

- 3 × 20 mm (0.79 in) MG 151/20s, one engine-mounted (300 rounds) and two wing-mounted (250 rpg)

== See also ==
Related development

- Fiat G.50

Aircraft of comparable role, configuration, and era

- CAC CA-15
- Macchi C.205
- Messerschmitt Bf 109G
- North American P-51D Mustang
- Reggiane Re.2005
- Supermarine Spitfire
- VL Pyörremyrsky

Related lists

- List of aircraft of World War II
- List of aircraft of Italy in World War II
