= List of military aircraft of Denmark =

The following list contains the aircraft used by the Royal Danish Air Force or its predecessors, the Royal Danish Army Air Corps and Royal Danish Naval Aviation Service. During the Nazi occupation from 1940 to 1945, Danish military aviation was prohibited. The aircraft currently in use are highlighted in blue.

== Key ==
Esk means eskadrille (squadron).
FLSK means Flyveskolen (flying school).
HFT means Hærens Flyvetjeneste (Army Air Corps).
SHT means Søværnets Helikoptertjeneste (Danish Naval Air Squadron).
TOS means Taken on strength
WFU means Withdrawn from use
Bold are present users.

== Before the Second World War ==
Code	Aircraft	# Used	TOS	WFU	Notes
n/a	Farman MF.7 Longhorn	6	1913	1922	
n/a	Farman HF.20	3	1913	1919	
n/a	Caudron G.3	1	1914	1922	
n/a	Blériot XI	1	1915	1915	
n/a	Morane-Saulnier H	2	1915	1919	
n/a	Orlogsværftet DK.I & II	2	1916	1924	
n/a	Vickers F.B.5	12	1917	1924	
n/a	Orlogsværftet H-Maskinen	9	1917	1924	
n/a	Nielsen & Winther Type Aa, Ab & Ac	8	1917	1919	
n/a	Orlogsvaerftet H.B.I, F.B.IV & F.B.V	9	1918	1924	
n/a	Sodertalje S.W.17	2	1918	1924	
n/a	LVG B.III	5	1920	1929	
n/a	Hansa-Brandenburg W.29	14	1921	1931	
n/a	Breguet XIV	4	1921	1927	
n/a	Avro 504K & N	17	1921	1936	
n/a	Rumpler B.I	1	1921	1921	
n/a	Fokker D.VII	1	1922	1927	
n/a	Fokker C.I	5	1923	1933	
n/a	Potez 15	8	1923	1928	
n/a	Fokker S.III	2	1924	1927	
n/a	Fokker C.V-B & -E	42	1926	1940	
n/a	Hawker Danecock	15	1926	1937	
n/a	Heinkel HE 8	22	1928	1940	
n/a	Hawker Dantorp	2	1933	1940	
n/a	Orlogsværftet O-Maskinen	23	1926	1940	
n/a	de Havilland DH.60G Gipsy Moth	6	1928	1934	
n/a	de Havilland DH.60M Moth	2	1929	1934	
n/a	Bristol Bulldog	4	1931	1940	
n/a	Avro 621 Tutor	6	1932	1940	
n/a	de Havilland DH.82 Tiger Moth	15	1933	1940	
n/a	de Havilland DH.84M Dragon I	2	1934	1939	
n/a	Nimrødderne / Danish Hawker Nimrod	12	1934	1940	used by naval air arm (Marinens Flyvevæsen)
n/a	Cierva C30 Autogyro	2	1936	1940	
n/a	Gloster Gauntlet	18	1936	1940	
n/a	De Havilland DH.90 Dragonfly	2	1937	1939	
n/a	Fokker D.XXI	22	1938	1940	or 12

Before the war Danish efforts to acquire new aircraft had been increased. Denmark ordered 12 Fokker G.I together with a production license, and allegedly production of the Fairey Battle for the Danish Air Force was under way when the Germans invaded the country in 1940. Production of 12 Fairey P.4/34 for the air arm of the Danish Navy had started, but could not be completed before the invasion either. The Italian Macchi MC.200 was chosen as a replacement for the ageing Nimrødderne fighters of the naval air arm, the acquisition contract being ready to be signed at the time of German invasion, but never concluded. The Orlogsværftet J.1 indigenous Danish fighter design did not reach beyond project stage.

== Second World War (Danish Brigade in Sweden) ==
Code	Aircraft	# Used	TOS	WFU	Notes
n/a	SAAB B17C	15	1945	1945	Not flown in Denmark

== Post-Second World War ==
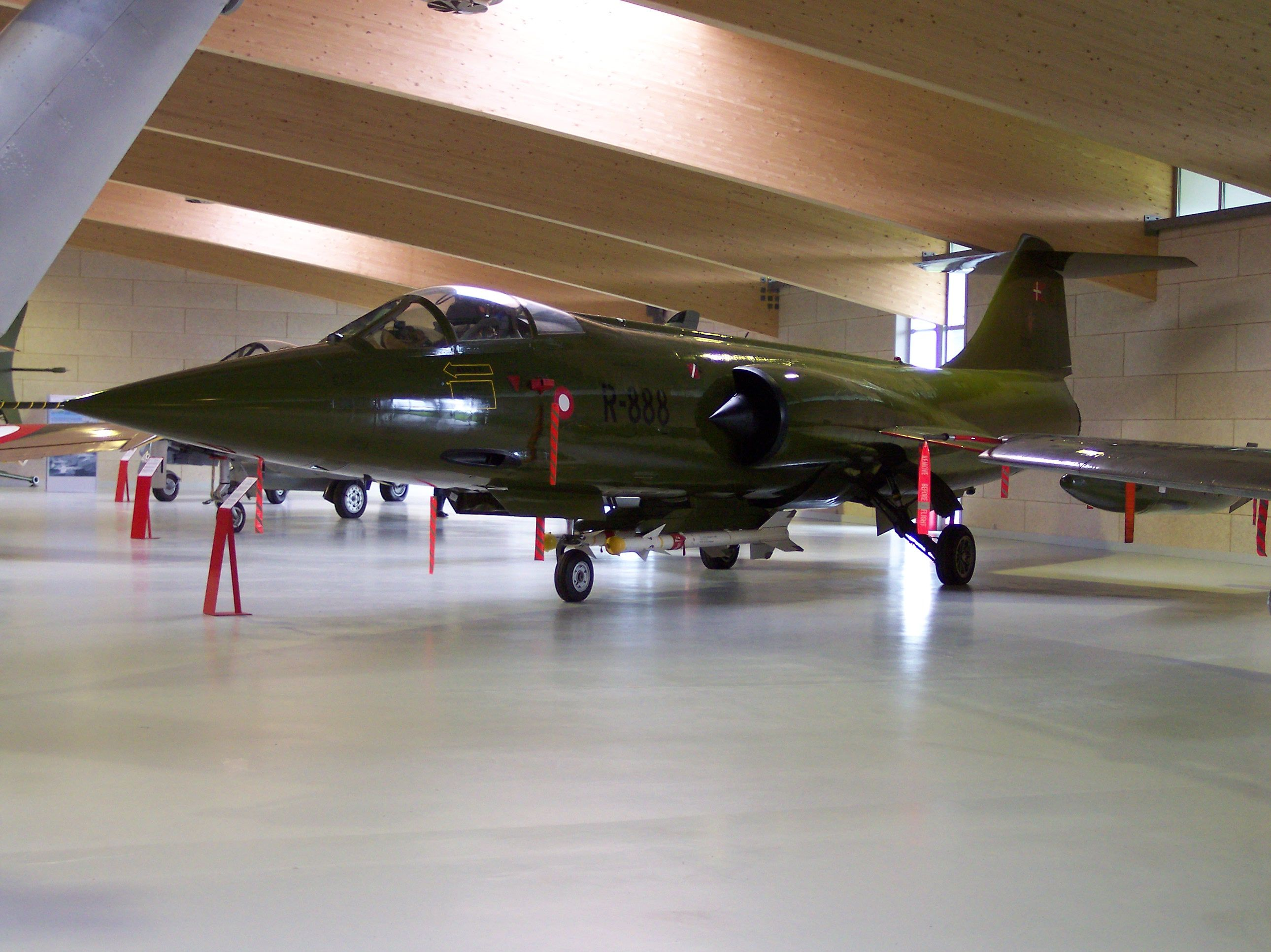
A Danish F-104G.

Code	Aircraft	# Used	TOS	WFU	Notes
n/a	Percival Proctor P.44 Mk.III	6	1945	1951	
n/a	North American Harvard Mk.II	39	1946	1956	
n/a	Supermarine Sea Otter	7	1946	1952	
n/a	Airspeed Oxford	48	1946	1955	
n/a	SAI KZ II	15	1946	1955	FLSK
n/a	Supermarine Spitfire H.F.Mk.IXE	36	1947	1956	
n/a	Supermarine Spitfire P.R.Mk.XI	3	1947	1956	
O	SAI KZ VII	10	1948	1977	FLSK & Esk 722
n/a	Boeing B-17G Flying Fortress	1	1948	1955	Esk 721
n/a	Gloster Meteor F.4/F.8	40	1949	1962	Esk 723
n/a	Gloster Meteor T.7	9	1950	1963	
P	de Havilland Canada DHC-1 Chipmunk	27	1950	1976	FLSK
n/a	Fairey Firefly TT.1	6	1951	1959	Esk 722
n/a	Republic F-84E Thunderjet	6	1951	1955	Esk 725
n/a	Armstrong Whitworth Meteor NF.11	20	1952	1959	Esk 723, 6 converted to TT.20
n/a	Bell 47D	3	1952	1958	Esk 722, with the Geological Survey of Denmark and Greenland.
n/a	SAI KZ X	12	1952	1959	FLSK
A	Republic F-84G Thunderjet	238	1952	1961	Esk 725, 726, 727, 728, 729 & 730
DT	Lockheed T-33A Shooting Star	26	1953	1977	
K	Douglas C-47 Skytrain	8	1953	1982	Esk 721
E	Hawker Hunter F.51	30	1956	1974	Esk 724
n/a	Percival Pembroke C-52	7	1956	1960	
S	Sikorsky S-55C	7	1957	1966	Esk 722
C	Republic RF-84F Thunderflash	23	1957	1971	
L	Consolidated Catalina	8	1957	1970	Esk 721 & Esk 722
F	North American F-86D Sabre	59	1958	1966	Esk 723, 726 & 728
T	Agusta-Bell AB-47G	3	1958	1966	Esk 722
ET	Hawker Hunter T.53	2	1958	1974	Esk 724
G	North American F-100D Super Sabre	48	1959	1982	Esk 725, 727 & 730
GT	North American F-100F Super Sabre	24	1959	1982	Esk 725, 727 & 730
N	Douglas C-54D Skymaster	6	1959	1977	Esk 721
M	Alouette III	8	1962	1977	Esk 722
R	Lockheed F-104G Starfighter	25	1964	1986	MAP, Esk 723 & 726,
RT	Lockheed TF-104G Starfighter	4	1964	1986	MAP, Esk 723 & 726
U	Sikorsky S-61A	9	1965	2010	Esk 722
ET	Hawker Hunter T.7	4	1967	1974	Ex-Dutch AF Esk 724
A	Saab F-35 Draken (A 35XD)	20	1970	1992	Esk 725
AR	Saab RF-35 Draken (S 35XD)	20	1970	1993	Esk 729
AT	Saab TF-35 Draken (Sk 35XD)	11	1971	1993	Esk 725 & 729
R	Canadair CF-104G Starfighter	15	1971	1984	ex-Canadian, Esk 723 & 726
RT	Canadair CF-104D Starfighter	7	1971	1986	ex-Canadian, Esk 723 & 726
B	Lockheed C-130H Hercules	3	1975	2004	Esk 721, to Egypt
T	Saab-MFI 17 Supporter	32	1975	current	FLSK & HFT
E/ET	General Dynamics F-16	72	1980	2026	Esk 723, 726, 727 & 730
F	Gulfstream III/C-20	4	1982	2004	Esk 721
C	Bombardier Challenger 604	4	1998	current	Esk 721
H	Hughes OH-6 Cayuse	15	2003	2005	Esk 724 (HFT)
P	Eurocopter Fennec	12	2003	current	Esk 724 (HFT)
B	Lockheed Martin C-130J Super Hercules	4	2004	current	Esk 721
M	AgustaWestland AW101	14	2006	current	Esk 722
S	Westland Super Lynx	8	2011	current	Esk 723 (SHT)
S	Westland Super Lynx	8	2011	current	Esk 723 (SHT)
	F-35 Lightning II	15+6	2021	current	15 in Denmark, 6 in USA for training

=== Navy ===
Danish Naval Air Squadron (Søværnets Helikoptertjeneste) disbanded 2010 and equipment transferred to air force (Esk 723).

Code	Aircraft	# Used	TOS	WFU	Notes
M	Sud Aviation Alouette III	8	1977	1982	ex-Esk 722 (1962–77)
S	Westland Lynx	11	1980	2006	One for ground training.
S	Westland Super Lynx	8	2000	2010	

=== Army ===
Army Air Corps (Hærens Flyvetjeneste) ended in 2003 and equipment transferred to air force (Esk 724).

Code	Aircraft	# Used	TOS	WFU	Notes
Y	Piper L-4	16	1957	1977	
H	Hughes OH-6 Cayuse	15	1971	2003	
P	Eurocopter Fennec	12	1980	2003	
D	Sagem Sperwer	11	2002	2005	Danish Artillery Regiment

== See also ==
- Royal Danish Air Force

== Bibliography ==
- Butler, Phil and Tony Buttler. Gloster Meteor: Britain's Celebrated First-Generation Jet. Hersham, Surrey, UK: Midland Publishing, 2006. ISBN 1-85780-230-6.
- Crawford, Alex. Bristol Bulldog, Gloster Gauntlet. Redbourn, UK: Mushroom Model Publications, 2005. ISBN 83-89450-04-6.
- De Jong, Peter. Le Fokker D.21 (Collection Profils Avions 9) (in French). Outreau, France: Éditions Lela Presse, 2005. ISBN 2-914017-26-X.
- Hall, Alan W. Hawker Hunter - Warpaint Series No 8. Bedfordshire, UK: Hall Park Books, 1997. ISSN 1363-0369.
- Hansen, O.S.:Danskernes Fly, 2003, Aschehoug, ISBN 87-11-16282-1
- Kofoed, Hans. Danske Militaerfly Gennem 50 Ar 1912-62. Copenhagen: Flyv's Forlag, 1962.
- Schrøder, Hans A. Det Danske Flyvevåben, Tøjhusmuseet, Denmark 1992. ISBN 87-89022-24-6
- Schrøder, Hans A. Historien om Flyvevåbnet, Komiteen til udgivelse af "Historien om Flyvevåbnet", 1990. ISBN 87-503-8509-7.
