= List of historical aircraft in Switzerland =

This article lists individual aircraft of historical or technical significance located in Switzerland.

The list constituting the basis of this article was drafted by the Swiss Federal Office for Civil Protection (FOCP) in the course of the 2008 review of the Swiss Inventory of Cultural Property of National and Regional Significance. The Swiss Committee for the Protection of Cultural Goods decided not to include aircraft in the public review draft of the Inventory and made the corresponding list available separately.

Type	Registration	Design	Construction	Service	Construction date	Conformity to original design	Interest	Number existing in Switzerland	Number existing worldwide	Status
Roesgen EPR 301	HB-OIX	Switzerland	Switzerland	Switzerland	1921–1945	Unmodified	Technical and historical	Unique	Unique	Airworthy
C 3603	HB-RBI	Switzerland	Switzerland	Switzerland	1921–1945	Unmodified	Technical and historical	Unique	Unique	Airworthy
AC 4	HB-ETI	Switzerland	Switzerland	Switzerland	1921–1945	Unmodified	Technical and historical	Unique	2–5	Airworthy
AC 4	HB-IKO	Switzerland	Switzerland	Switzerland	1921–1945	Unmodified	Technical	Unique	2–5	Airworthy
U 3 M PELIKAN	HB-TBV	Switzerland	Switzerland	Switzerland	After 1945	Unmodified	Technical	2–5	2–5	Airworthy
D 3801	HB-RCF	Europe	Switzerland under licence	Switzerland	1921–1945	Unmodified	Technical and historical	Unique	Unique	Airworthy
Blériot 11 "R"	HB-RCV	Europe	Switzerland	Switzerland and abroad	Avant 1920	Unmodified	Historical	Unique	6–20	Airworthy
JOB 15-180/2	HB-KEV	Switzerland	Others	Switzerland and abroad	After 1945	Unmodified	Technical and historical	Unique	2–5	Airworthy
HI-27 MK II	HB-MSK	Switzerland	Others	Switzerland and abroad	After 1945	Unmodified	Technical and historical	Unique	2–5	Airworthy
D 26	HB-RAI	Europe	Switzerland	Switzerland	1921–1945	Minor modifications	Technical	2–5	2–5	Airworthy
P2-05	HB-RAX	Switzerland	Switzerland	Switzerland and abroad	After 1945	Unmodified	Technical and historical	2–5	6–20	Airworthy
Mignet HM8 "R"	HB-YEI	Europe	Switzerland under licence	Switzerland	After 1945	Unmodified	Technical and historical	Unique	Unique	Airworthy
KZ II	HB-EPU	Outside Europe	Others	Switzerland and abroad	1921–1945	Unmodified	Technical and historical	Unique	2–5	Airworthy
DH 60 G III	HB-UPE	Europe	Others	Switzerland and abroad	1921–1945	Unmodified	Technical and historical	2–5	2–5	Airworthy
DH 60 G	HB-AFO	Europe	Others	Switzerland and abroad	1921–1945	Unmodified	Technical and historical	2–5	2–5	Airworthy
PRAGA E 114 M	HB-UAF	Europe	Others	Switzerland and abroad	After 1945	Unmodified	Technical and historical	Unique	2–5	Airworthy
Potez 600	HB-SPM	Europe	Others	Switzerland and abroad	1921–1945	Unmodified	Historical	Unique	2–5	Airworthy
Auster Serie 5J1	HB-EOF	Europe	Others	Switzerland and abroad	After 1945	Unmodified	Historical	Unique	2–5	Derelict
KL 35 DKL 35 D	HB-UBK	Europe	Others	Switzerland and abroad	1921–1945	Unmodified	Technical and historical	Unique	6–20	Airworthy
MS 317	HB-RAO	Europe	Others	Switzerland and abroad	1921–1945	Unmodified	Technical and historical	Unique	6–20	Airworthy
JU 52/3 mg4e	HB-HOS	Europe	Others	Switzerland and abroad	1921–1945	Unmodified	Technical and historical	2–5	6–20	Airworthy
JODEL D 11	HB-SOH	Europe	Switzerland under licence	Switzerland	After 1945	Minor modifications	Historical	Unique	2–5	Airworthy
ST 3 KR	HB-RDD	Outside Europe	Others	Switzerland and abroad	1921–1945	Unmodified	Technical and historical	Unique	6–20	Airworthy
Grumman TBM-3R	HB-RDG	Outside Europe	Others	Switzerland and abroad	1921–1945	Unmodified	Technical and historical	Unique	6–20	Airworthy
DC 3 C	HB-ISC	Outside Europe	Others	Switzerland and abroad	1921–1945	Unmodified	Technical and historical	2–5	20+	Airworthy
FW P149 D	HB-KIU	Europe	Others	Switzerland and abroad	After 1945	Unmodified	Technical and historical	2–5	6–20	Derelict
WACO YMF (FSC)	HB-UPZ	Europe	Others	Switzerland and abroad	1993	Unmodified	Technical and historical	Unique	20+	Airworthy
P3-05	HB-RCY	Switzerland	Switzerland	Switzerland and abroad	After 1945	Unmodified	Technical	6–20	20+	Airworthy
Bellanca 14-13-3	HB-DUN	Outside Europe	Others	Switzerland and abroad	After 1945	Unmodified	Technical and historical	Unique	6–20	Airworthy
24W41A (UC61A)	HB-EMI	Outside Europe	Others	Switzerland and abroad	1921–1945	Unmodified	Technical	Unique	20+	Airworthy
KZ VII	HB-EPS	Outside Europe	Others	Switzerland and abroad	After 1945	Unmodified	Technical and historical	Unique	Unique	Airworthy
24 R 46 A	HB-ERO	Outside Europe	Others	Switzerland and abroad	1921–1945	Unmodified	Technical and historical	Unique	20+	Airworthy
DH 82 A	HB-UPY	Europe	Others	Switzerland and abroad	1921–1945	Unmodified	Technical and historical	2–5	20+	Airworthy
DH 115 MK 55	HB-RVI	Europe	Others	Switzerland and abroad	After 1945	Unmodified	Technical and historical	2–5	6–20	Airworthy
DH 100 MK6 Vampire	HB-RVN	Europe	Others	Switzerland and abroad	After 1945	Unmodified	Technical and historical	2–5	6–20	Airworthy
Nord 1203 II	HB-DAI	Europe	Others	Switzerland and abroad	After 1945	Unmodified	Historical	Unique	6–20	Airworthy
AERO 45 S	HB-EKC	Europe	Others	Switzerland and abroad	After 1945	Unmodified	Historical	Unique	6–20	Airworthy
NAVION (L-17 A)	HB-EPN	Outside Europe	Others	Switzerland and abroad	1921–1945	Unmodified	Technical and historical	2–5	20+	Airworthy
F 15	HB-EVW	Europe	Others	Switzerland and abroad	After 1945	Unmodified	Technical	Unique	6–20	Airworthy
T 6 G	HB-RCN	Outside Europe	Others	Switzerland and abroad	1921–1945	Unmodified	Technical and historical	2–5	20+	Airworthy
Jodel D 11	HB-SAE	Europe	Switzerland under licence	Switzerland and abroad	After 1945	Unmodified	Technical and historical	2–5	20+	Airworthy
Stinson L 5	HB-TRY	Europe	Others	Switzerland and abroad	1921–1945	Unmodified	Technical	Unique	20+	Airworthy
BUE 133	HB-MIZ	Europe	Switzerland under licence	Switzerland and abroad	1921–1945	Unmodified	Technical	6–20	20+	Airworthy
DHC 1	HB-TUM	Outside Europe	Others	Switzerland and abroad	After 1945	Unmodified	Technical and historical	Unique	20+	Airworthy
Stampe SV 4 C	HB-UPS	Europe	Others	Switzerland and abroad	After 1945	Unmodified	Historical	2–5	20+	Airworthy
Hunter MK 58	HB-RVQ	Europe	Others	Switzerland and abroad	After 1945	Unmodified	Technical and historical	2–5	20+	Airworthy
Hunter T. MK 68	HB-RVR	Europe	Others	Switzerland and abroad	After 1945	Unmodified	Technical	2–5	6–20	Airworthy
VARIEZE	HB-YBG	Europe	Switzerland under licence	Switzerland and abroad	1921–1945	Unmodified	Technical and historical	6–20	20+	Airworthy
Luscombe 8 A	HB-DUS	Outside Europe	Others	Switzerland and abroad	1921–1945	Unmodified	Technical	2–5	20+	Airworthy
ERLA 5 A	HB-SEX	Europe	Others	Switzerland and abroad	1921–1945	Minor modifications	Historical	6–20	Unique	Airworthy
BUE 131	HB-AFE	Outside Europe	Others	Switzerland and abroad	1921–1945	Unmodified	Technical and historical	6–20	20+	Airworthy
F 260	HB-EVT	Europe	Others	Switzerland and abroad	After 1945	Unmodified	Technical	2–5	20+	Airworthy
JODEL D 112	HB-SOG	Europe	Switzerland under licence	Switzerland and abroad	After 1945	Minor modifications	Technical and historical	2–5	20+	Airworthy
F 8 L	HB-UOH	Europe	Others	Switzerland and abroad	After 1945	Unmodified	Technical	2–5	20+	Airworthy
DH 112 MK 1 Venom	HB-RVC	Europe	Switzerland under licence	Switzerland and abroad	After 1945	Unmodified	Technical	2–5	20+	Static exposition
CE 170	HB-CAO	Outside Europe	Others	Switzerland and abroad	After 1945	Unmodified	Technical	2–5	20+	Airworthy
MS 505	HB-EJJ	Outside Europe	Others	Switzerland and abroad	After 1945	Modifications importantes	Technical and historical	Unique	6–20	Airworthy
ERCO 415 C	HB-ERH	Outside Europe	Others	Switzerland and abroad	After 1945	Unmodified	Technical and historical	2–5	20+	Derelict
CHAMPION 7 AC	HB-ETF	Outside Europe	Others	Switzerland and abroad	After 1945	Unmodified	Technical	2–5	20+	Airworthy
Saab 91 D	HB-DBL	Europe	Others	Switzerland and abroad	After 1945	Modifications importantes	Historical	Unique	6–20	Airworthy
J3C-65-L4	HB-OER	Outside Europe	Others	Switzerland and abroad	1921–1945	Unmodified	Technical and historical	20+	20+	Airworthy
PA 18-150	HB-OPU	Outside Europe	Others	Switzerland and abroad	After 1945	Unmodified	Technical and historical	6–20	20+	Airworthy
E75 (PT13 D N 255)	HB-RBG	Outside Europe	Others	Switzerland and abroad	1921–1945	Modifications importantes	Technical and historical	2–5	20+	Airworthy
J3C-65-L4	HB-ELO	Outside Europe	Others	Switzerland and abroad	1921–1945	Unmodified	Technical and historical	20+	20+	Airworthy
J3C-65-L4	HB-OBL	Outside Europe	Others	Switzerland and abroad	1921–1945	Unmodified	Technical and historical	20+	20+	Airworthy
MS 880 B	HB-EDE	Europe	Others	Switzerland and abroad	After 1945	Unmodified	Technical and historical	6–20	20+	Derelict
CE 140	HB-CAB	Europe	Others	Switzerland and abroad	After 1945	Minor modifications	Technical	2–5	20+	Airworthy
J3C-65-L4	HB-ODH	Outside Europe	Others	Switzerland and abroad	1921–1945	Minor modifications	Technical and historical	20+	20+	Airworthy
J3C-65-L4	HB-OBB	Outside Europe	Others	Switzerland and abroad	1921–1945	Minor modifications	Technical and historical	20+	20+	Airworthy
