= Widerøe fleet =

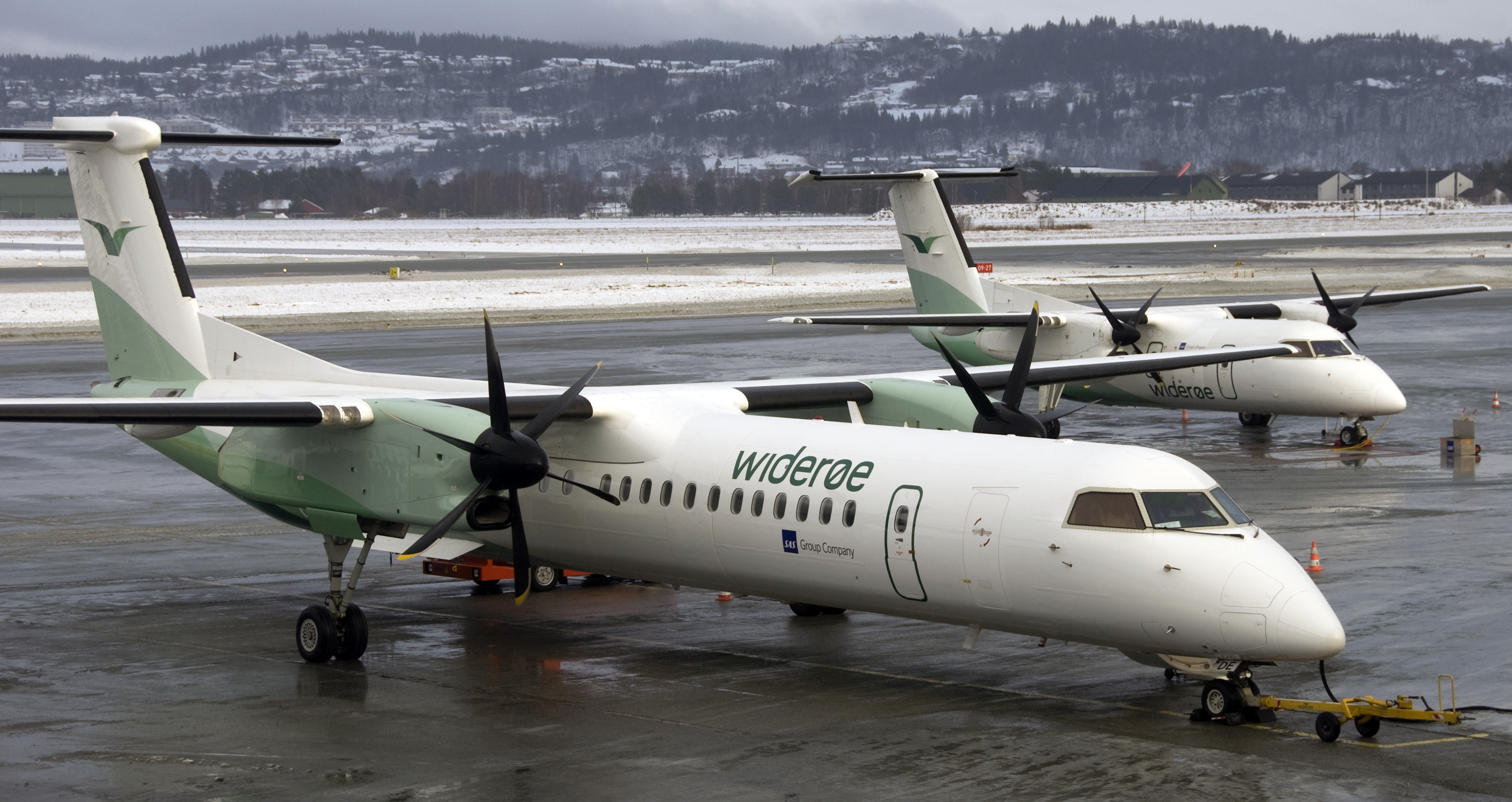
Two Bombardier Dash 8 aircraft at Trondheim Airport, Værnes; a Q400 closest and a -100 furthest away.

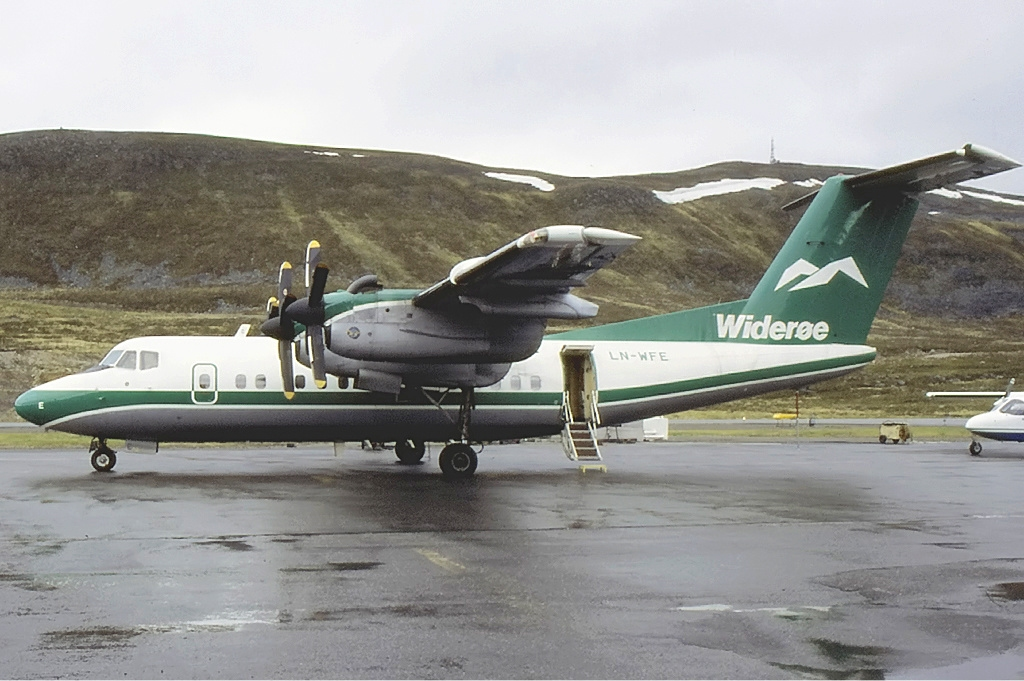
de Havilland Canada DHC-7 Dash 7 at Hammerfest Airport in 1987

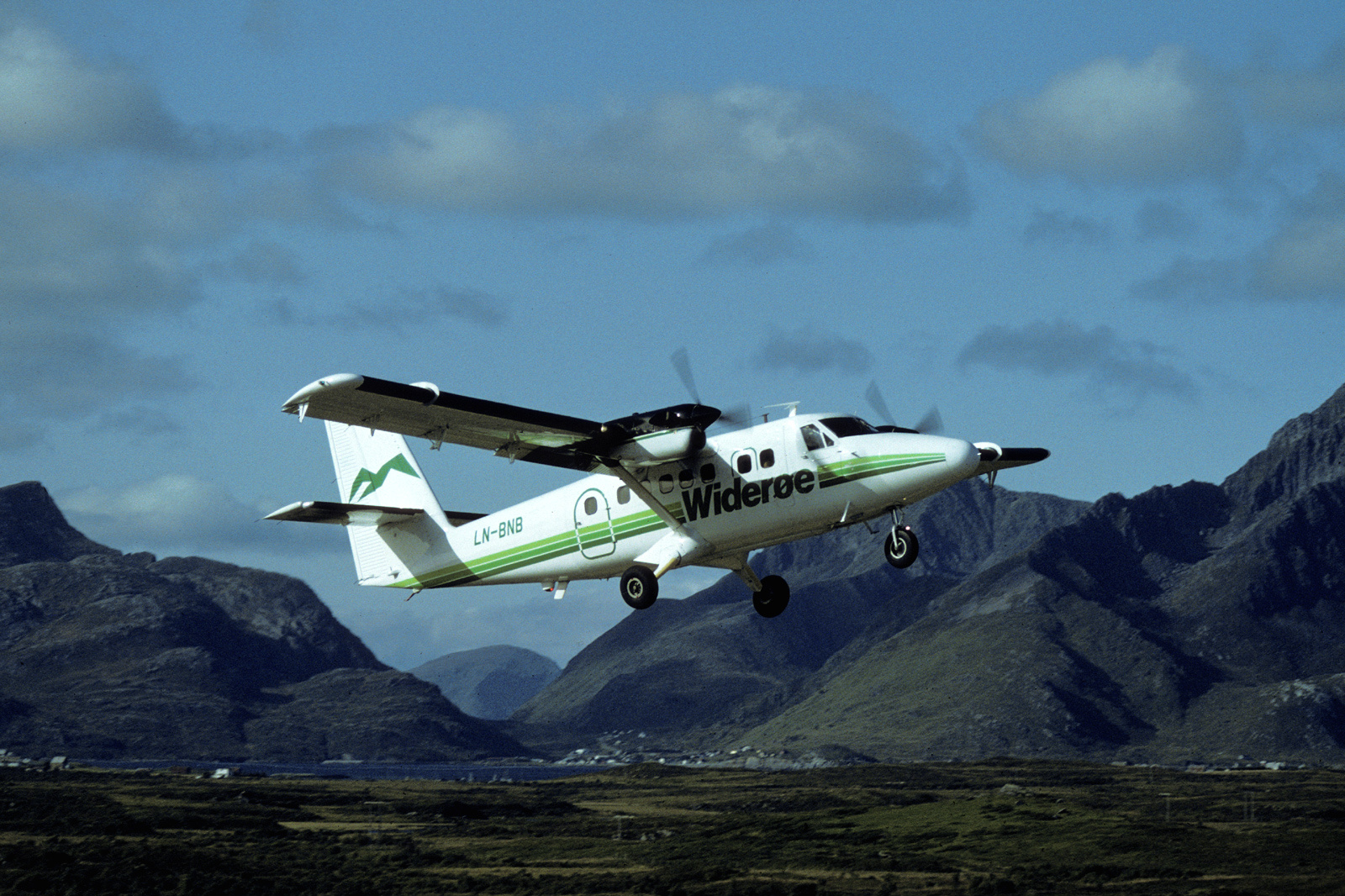
de Havilland Canada DHC-6 Twin Otter at Leknes Airport in 1992

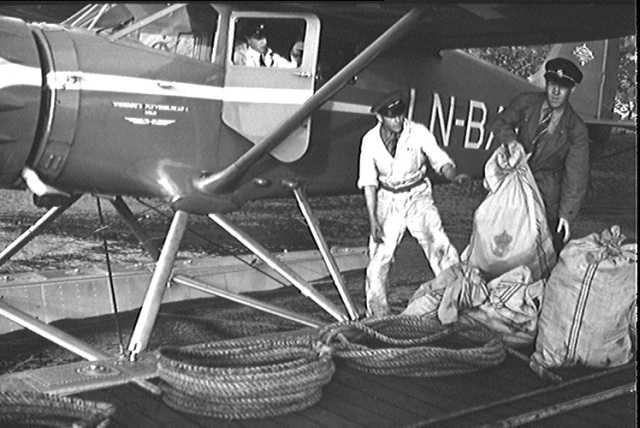
Stinson Reliant at Gressholmen Airport in 1936

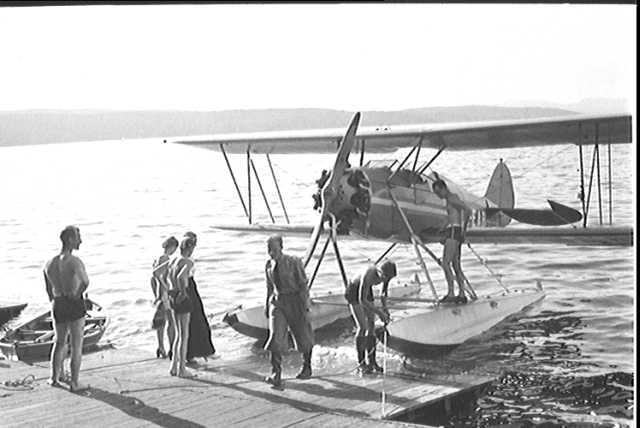
Waco Cabin at Oppegård in 1937

Widerøe is a Norwegian regional airline. Between 2000 and 2018, the airline operated a fleet consisting entirely of de Havilland Canada/Bombardier Dash 8 aircraft. Since 2018, Widerøe also operates with Embraer E190 E2 aircraft. As of 2017, Widerøe operated 25 of the 39-seat -100/200 series, seven of the 50-seat -300 series and 11 of the 78-seat Q400 series. It holds orders for another four Q400. As of 2018, Widerøe is the world's largest operator of the -100-series.

== Fleet ==
Manufacturer	Model	Quantity	Introduced	Retired	Capacity	Ref
Simmonds	Spartan	1	1934	1934	2–3	
de Havilland	DH.60 M Moth	7	1934	1937	2	
Waco	Cabin	2	1934	1937	5	
Hol's Der Taufel	—	2	1934	1937	1	
Waco	RNF	3	1935	1946	3	
Bellanca	31	1	1936	1940	8	
Stinson	SR.8/SR.9 Reliant	4	1936	1939	5	
Junkers	W 34	1	1936	1939	8	
Klemm	L-25d VII R	1	1936	1940	2	
Taylor	J-2 Cub	3	1937	1940	2	
Norsk Flyindustri	Hønningstad Norge A	1	1938	1940	2	
Klemm	Kl 35A	1	1938	1940	2	
Götaverken	GV-38	1	1940	1940	2	
Taylorcraft	Taylorcraft A	1	1940	1940	2	
Piper	J-A Cub Coupe	3	1940	1955	2	
Luscombe	8E Silvaire	4	1946	1955	2	
Messerschmitt	Bf 108 Taifun	2	1946	1954	4	
Fairchild	F-25 R Argus	4	1946	1954	4	
Fairchild	M-62A Cornell	5	1946	1958	2	
Norsk Flyindustri	Hønningstad Norge B	1	1946	1948	2–3	
Skandinavisk Aero Industri	KZ III	2	1946	1953	2	
Piper	L-4 Cub	4	1947	1960	2	
Avro	Anson V	1	1947	1951	10	
Skandinavisk Aero Industri	KZ VII Lærke	1	1947	1948	4	
Norsk Flyindustri	Hønningstad C-5 Polar	1	1948	1955		
Noorduyn	UC-64A Norseman	16	1949	1960	8	
Republic Aviation	R-3 Seabee	5	1949	1959		
Fairchild Aircraft	F24W Argus	1	1949	1952	4	
Airspeed	AS.40 Oxford	3	1951	1956	3	
Lockheed	12A	2	1956	1963	3	
Junkers	Ju 52	1	1956	1956	20	
Cessna	170	2	1952	1957	4	
de Havilland Canada	DHC-2 Beaver	1	1953	1955	6	
de Havilland Canada	DHC-3 Otter	7	1954	1971	13	
Douglas	Douglas RB-26C Invader	1	1958	1963	4	
Cessna	180	1	1959	1964	4	
Cessna	310	1	1961	1961	5	
Norsk Flyindustri	Hønningstad Norge C	1	1960	1963	4	
Douglas	DC-3	4	1962	1965	26	
Nord	Nord 262 Super Broussard	3	1962	1964	25	
Cessna	320	1	1963	1968	6	
Cessna	185	2	1963	1968	6	
Cessna	TU206	1	1967			
Cessna	411A	4	1968	1971	8	
de Havilland Canada	DHC-6 Twin Otter	18	1968	2000	22	
Cessna	337D	1	1969	1971	6	
Cessna	421A	1	1970	1970	6	
Sikorsky	S58T	4	1973	1982	15–16	
de Havilland Canada	Dash 7	8	1981	1996	52	
Bell	Bell 212	2	1982	1982	15	
Embraer	EMB 120 Brasilia	3	1992	1998	30	
Fokker	50	1	1992	1993	50	
de Havilland Canada	Dash-8-100	23	1992	present	39	
de Havilland Canada	Dash-8-300	12	1995	present	50	
de Havilland Canada	Dash-8 Q400	15	2001	present	78	
de Havilland Canada	Dash-8 Q200	3	2013	present	39	
Embraer	Embraer E190-E2	3	2018	present	114	
