= KZ 2 =

KZ 2 or variant, may refer to:

- Killzone 2, PlayStation 3 videogame
- KZ2, a kart racing class
- SAI KZ II, a Danish airplane

== See also ==
- KZ (disambiguation)
