= KZ1 =

KZ1 may refer to:

- KZ1 (karting), a 125 cc kart racing class
- KZ1 (yacht), New Zealand's 1988 America's Cup challenger
- Ascari KZ1, a British sports car
- SAI KZ I, a Danish airplane
- Kuaizhou 1 (KZ-1) Chinese solid fuel space rocket

== See also ==
- KZI (disambiguation)
- KZ (disambiguation)
