= KZI =

KZI or variant, may refer to:

- Kozani National Airport (IATA airport code: KZI)
- Kelabit language (ISO 639 code: kzi)
- SAI KZ I, a Danish airplane

== See also ==
- KZ1 (disambiguation)
