= SAI KZ IV =

Light twin-engined aircraft first built in Denmark in 1944

KZ IV
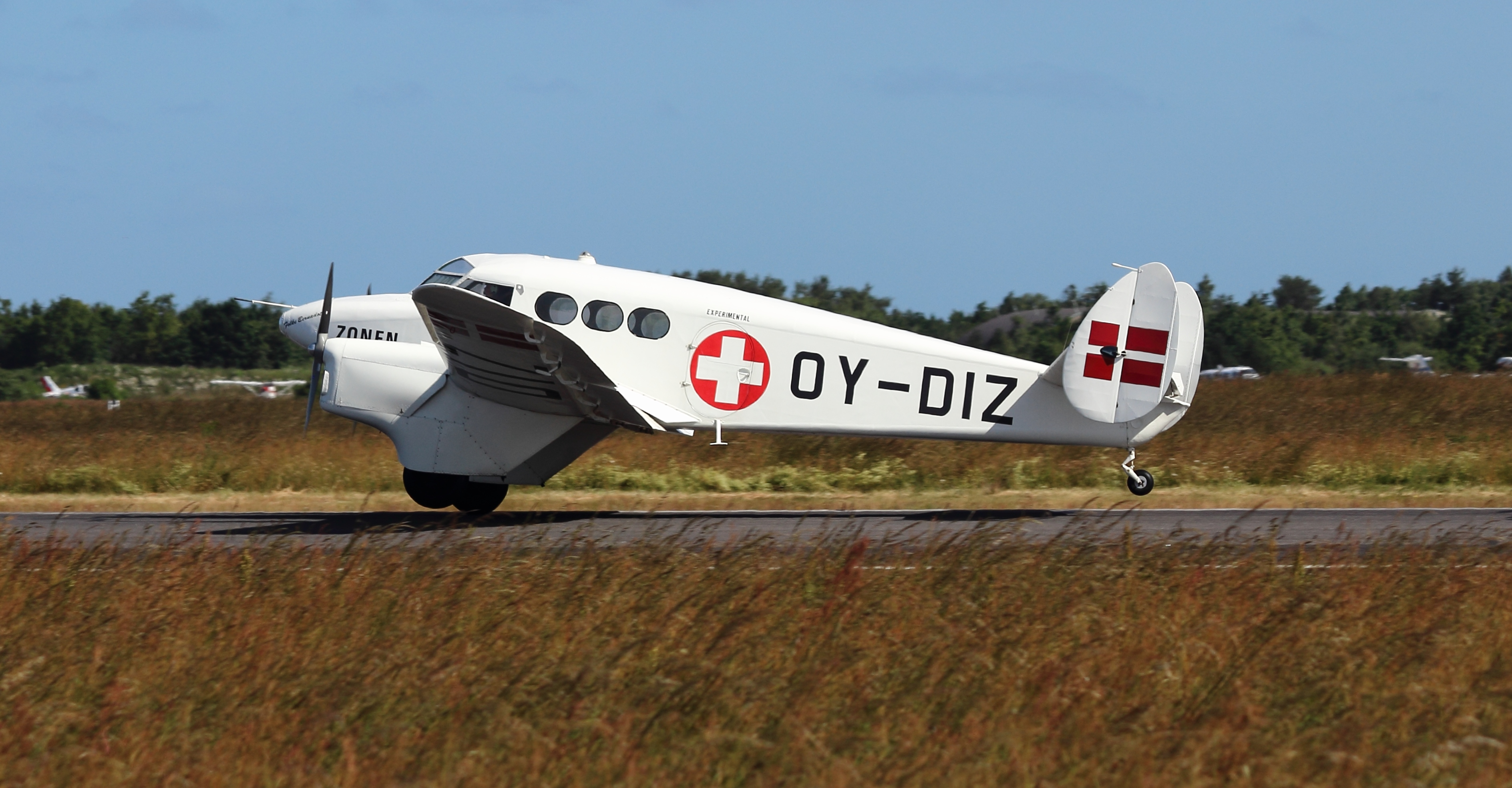
- KZ IV belonging to Danmarks Flymuseum landing at Danish Air Show 2014

General information
- Type: Air ambulance
- National origin: Denmark
- Manufacturer: Skandinavisk Aero Industri
- Designer: Viggo Kramme and Karl Gustav Zeuthen
- Number built: 2

History
- First flight: 4 May 1944

The SAI KZ IV was a light twin-engined aircraft first built in Denmark in 1944 for use as an air ambulance.

== Design and construction ==
It was a conventional, low-wing cantilever monoplane with twin tails, mounted on the ends of the horizontal stabiliser. Power was provided by two engines mounted in nacelles on the wings that also housed the main units of the fixed, tailwheel undercarriage. The cabin could hold two stretchers, two medical attendants, and a flight crew of two.

== Operational history ==
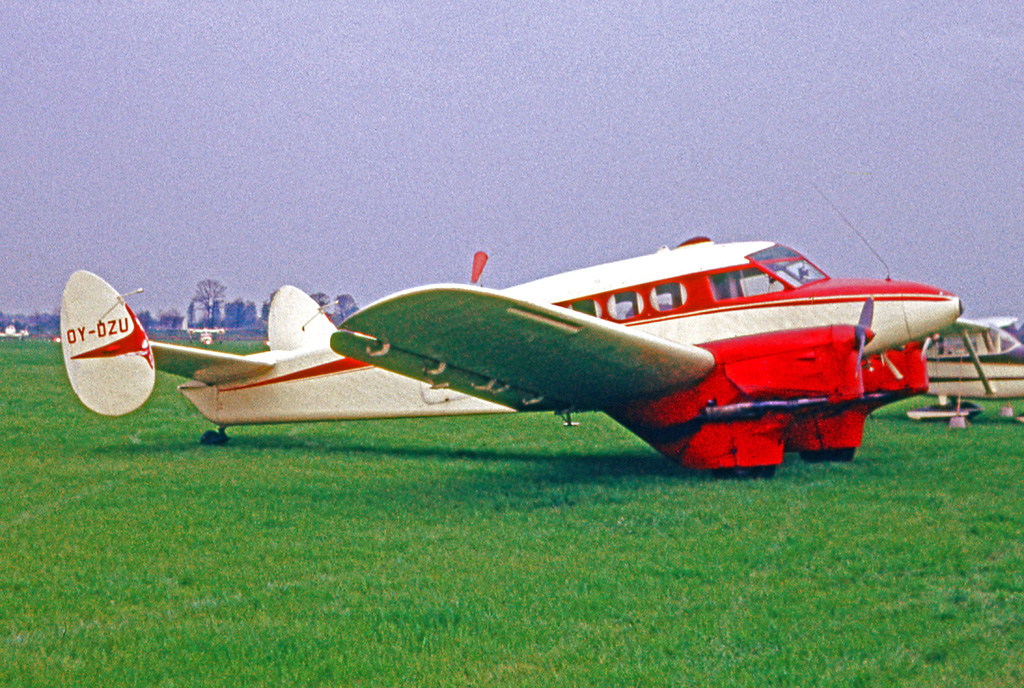
The second KZ IV at Hanover Airport, Germany, in 1964. This view shows the twin fin layout.

A single machine, registered OY-DIZ, was built during the war, with a second aircraft registered OY-DZU being built and flown in 1949. That same year, the OY-DIZ was christened with the name Folke Bernadotte in honour of the Swedish count who had used this very aircraft to make a diplomatic visit to Germany to negotiate for the release of Danish And Norwegian Kz prisoners in German concentration camps near the end of the war. This aircraft is now the "flagship" of the Danmarks Flymuseum collection, having been restored to its original wartime configuration and markings following a career as a utility aircraft in England and a crash in 1979. The second aircraft was actively operational until the mid-1960s.

== Specifications ==
Data from Jane's all the World's Aircraft 1947.

General characteristics

- Crew: 2
- Capacity: 2 stretchers and 2 seats for medical attendants
- Length: 9.8 m (32 ft 2 in)
- Wingspan: 16 m (52 ft 6 in)
- Height: 2.45 m (8 ft 0 in)
- Wing area: 30 m^{2} (320 sq ft)
- Empty weight: 1,200 kg (2,646 lb)
- Gross weight: 1,900 kg (4,189 lb) to 2,000 kg (4,400 lb)
- Fuel capacity: 240 L (63 US gal; 53 imp gal) fuel; 27.5 L (7.3 US gal; 6.0 imp gal) oil
- Powerplant: 2 × de Havilland Gipsy Major four cylinder inverted in-line air-cooled piston engine, 97 kW (130 hp) each
- Propellers: 2-bladed fixed pitch wooden propellers

Performance

- Maximum speed: 215 km/h (134 mph, 116 kn)
- Cruise speed: 200 km/h (120 mph, 110 kn)
- Landing speed: 75 km/h (47 mph; 40 kn)
- Range: 900 km (560 mi, 490 nmi)
- Wing loading: 66.6 kg/m^{2} (13.6 lb/sq ft) at 2,000 kg (4,400 lb)
- Power/mass: 10.19 kg/kW (16.75 lb/hp)
- Take-off run: 140 m (460 ft)
- Landing run: 70 m (230 ft)
