= SAI KZ VIII =

Aerobatic sport aircraft first built in Denmark in 1949

KZ VIII
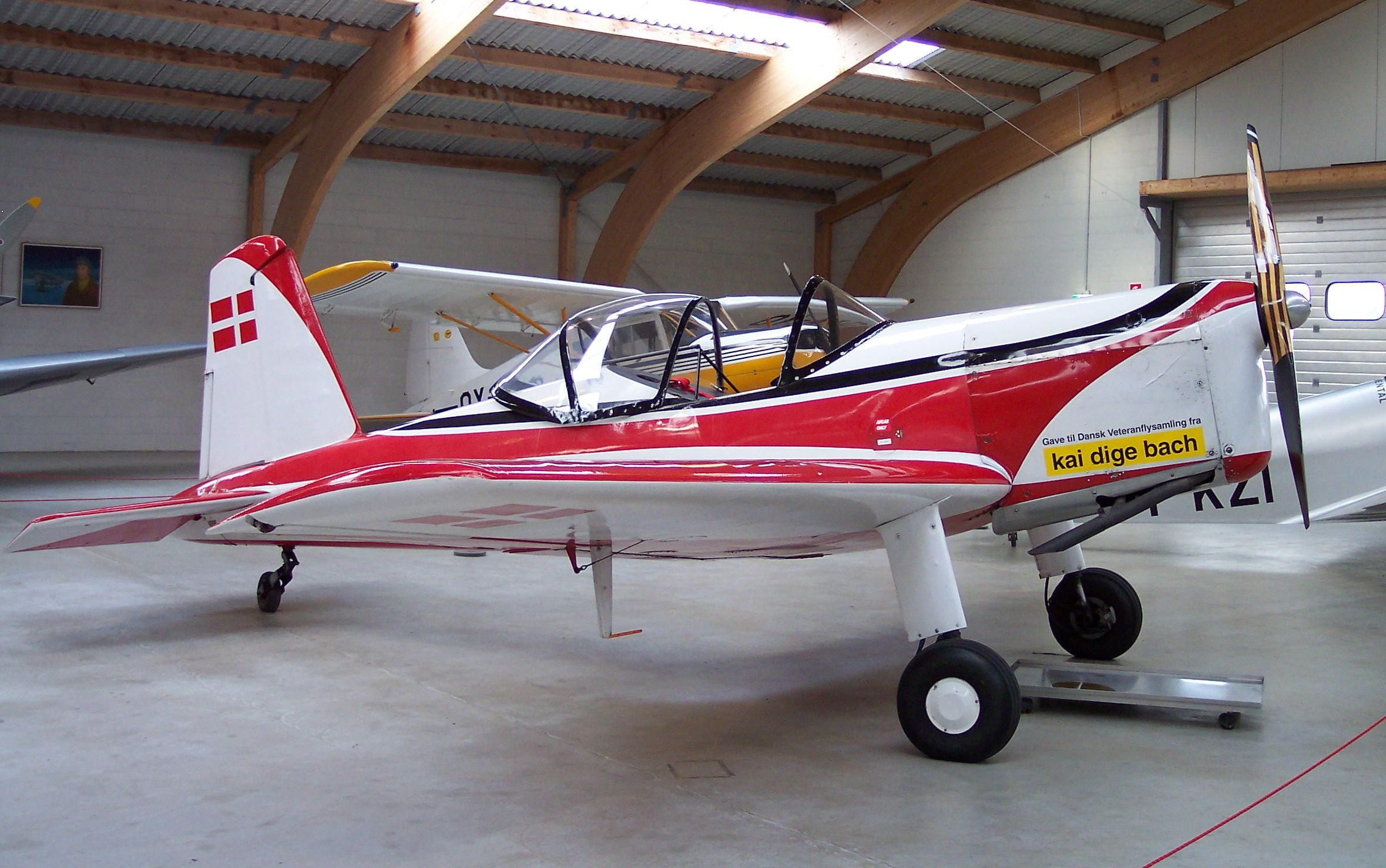
- The second KZ VII in the Danmarks Flymuseum, Stauning

General information
- Type: Aerobatics aircraft
- National origin: Denmark
- Manufacturer: Skandinavisk Aero Industri
- Designer: Björn Andreasson
- Number built: 3

History
- First flight: 14 November 1949

The SAI KZ VIII was an aerobatic sport aircraft first built in Denmark in 1949. Designed by Björn Andreasson, it was a low-wing cantilever monoplane of conventional configuration with fixed tailwheel undercarriage and a single seat. The first KZ VIII was custom-built by SAI for the Danish aerobatic display team Sylvest Jensen Luftcirkus, in which Peter Steen piloted the aircraft in some 50 performances in summer 1950. At the same time a full set of parts for a second aircraft was produced but this was not assembled until 1959. In 1996 another was completed by amateur builder Hardy Vad, powered by a flat-four engine.

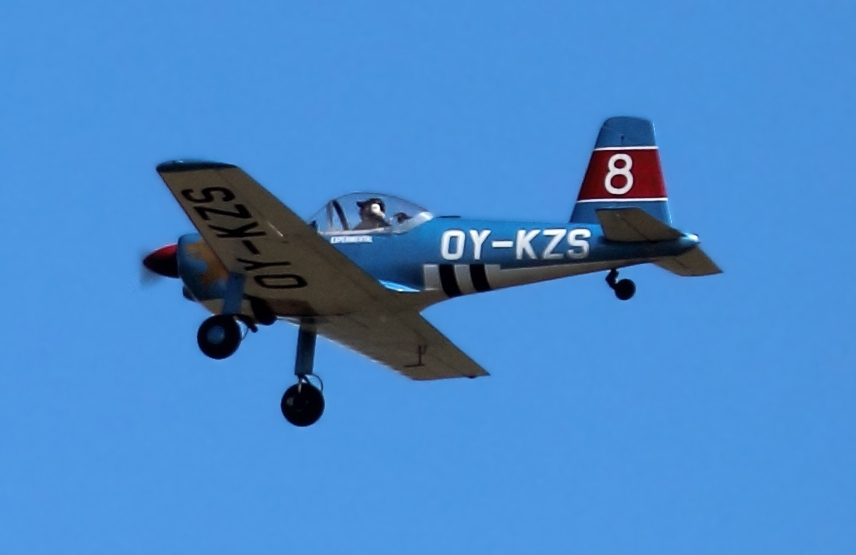
The third KZ VIII, flat-four powered

== Specifications ==
Data from Jane's All The World's Aircraft 1951–52.

General characteristics

- Crew: 1
- Length: 5.70 m (18 ft 8 in)
- Wingspan: 7.20 m (23 ft 7 in)
- Height: 1.80 m (5 ft 11 in)
- Wing area: 8.64 m^{2} (93.0 sq ft)
- Airfoil: NACA 23018 (root), NACA 4412 (tip)
- Empty weight: 407 kg (897 lb)
- Gross weight: 650 kg (1,433 lb)
- Powerplant: 1 × de Havilland Gipsy Major 10 air-cooled four-cylinder inline engine, 108 kW (145 hp)

Performance

- Maximum speed: 275 km/h (171 mph, 148 kn)
- Range: 584 km (363 mi, 315 nmi)
- Rate of climb: 8.00 m/s (1,575 ft/min)

== See also ==
Related lists

- List of aerobatic aircraft
