= SAI KZ X =

Light aircraft produced in Denmark

KZ X
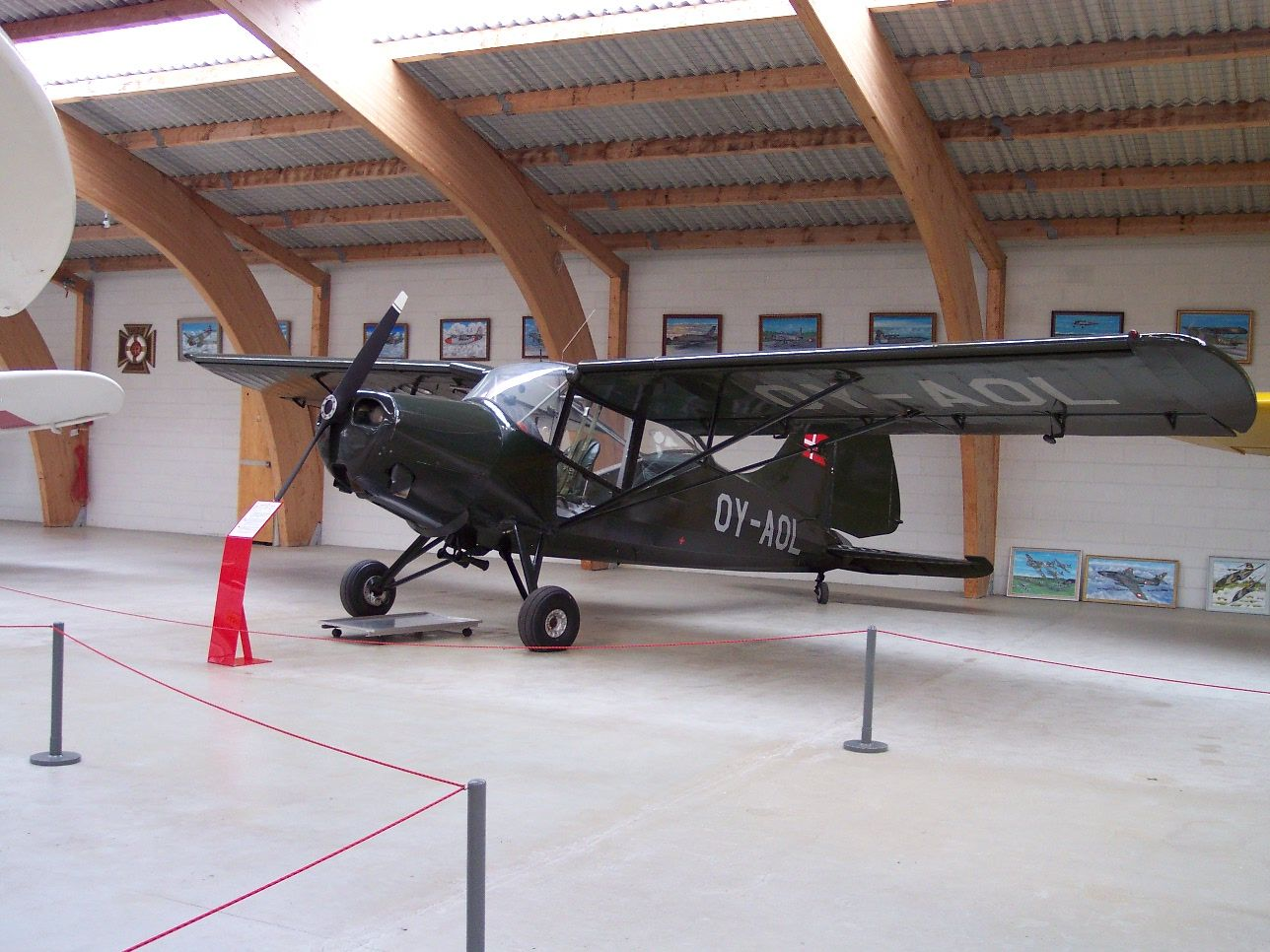
- KZ X prototype, after modification into KZ X Mk.2, in Danmarks Flymuseum

General information
- Type: Observation aircraft
- National origin: Denmark
- Manufacturer: Skandinavisk Aero Industri
- Primary user: Danish Army
- Number built: 12

History
- First flight: 29 September 1951

The SAI KZ X was a light aircraft produced in Denmark for army co-operation duties in the early 1950s.

== Design and development ==
The KZ X was a strut-braced, high-wing, two seat military observation monoplane developed from the KZ VII with a more powerful,108 kW (145 hp), Continental C145 engine.

Deliveries to the Danish Army began in 1952 but by the summer of that year two had already crashed. The investigations of these crashes, attributed to failure of the wooden rudder, were conducted with technical assistance from Britain's Royal Aircraft Establishment but no underlying defect in the aircraft design was uncovered. The prototype was modified with a steel-framed rudder as the KZ X Mk.2 but the KZ X was returned to service. When two more crashes took place in 1954 the type was finally withdrawn then scrapped in 1960, leaving the prototype as the only surviving example. It is now in the Danmarks Flymuseum, active again in 2009 after restoration.

== Operators ==
Denmark

- Royal Danish Army

== Specifications ==
General characteristics

- Crew: Two
- Length: 6.50 m (21 ft 4 in)
- Wingspan: 9.41 m (30 ft 10 in)
- Height: 2.20 m (7 ft 3 in)
- Wing area: 13.0 m^{2} (140 sq ft)
- Empty weight: 529 kg (1,166 lb)
- Gross weight: 860 kg (1,896 lb)
- Powerplant: 1 × Continental C145 air-cooled flat-six piston engine, 108 kW (145 hp)

Performance

- Maximum speed: 215 km/h (134 mph, 116 kn)
- Range: 800 km (500 mi, 430 nmi)
- Service ceiling: 4,400 m (14,400 ft)

== See also ==
- Bridgman, Leonard (1951). Jane's All The World's Aircraft 1951–52. London: Sampson Low, Marston & Company, Ltd.
- Taylor, Michael J. H. (1989). Jane's Encyclopedia of Aviation. London: Studio Editions. p. 563.
- Simpson, R. W. (1995). Airlife's General Aviation. Shrewsbury: Airlife Publishing. pp. 348–49.
