= Military museums in Denmark =

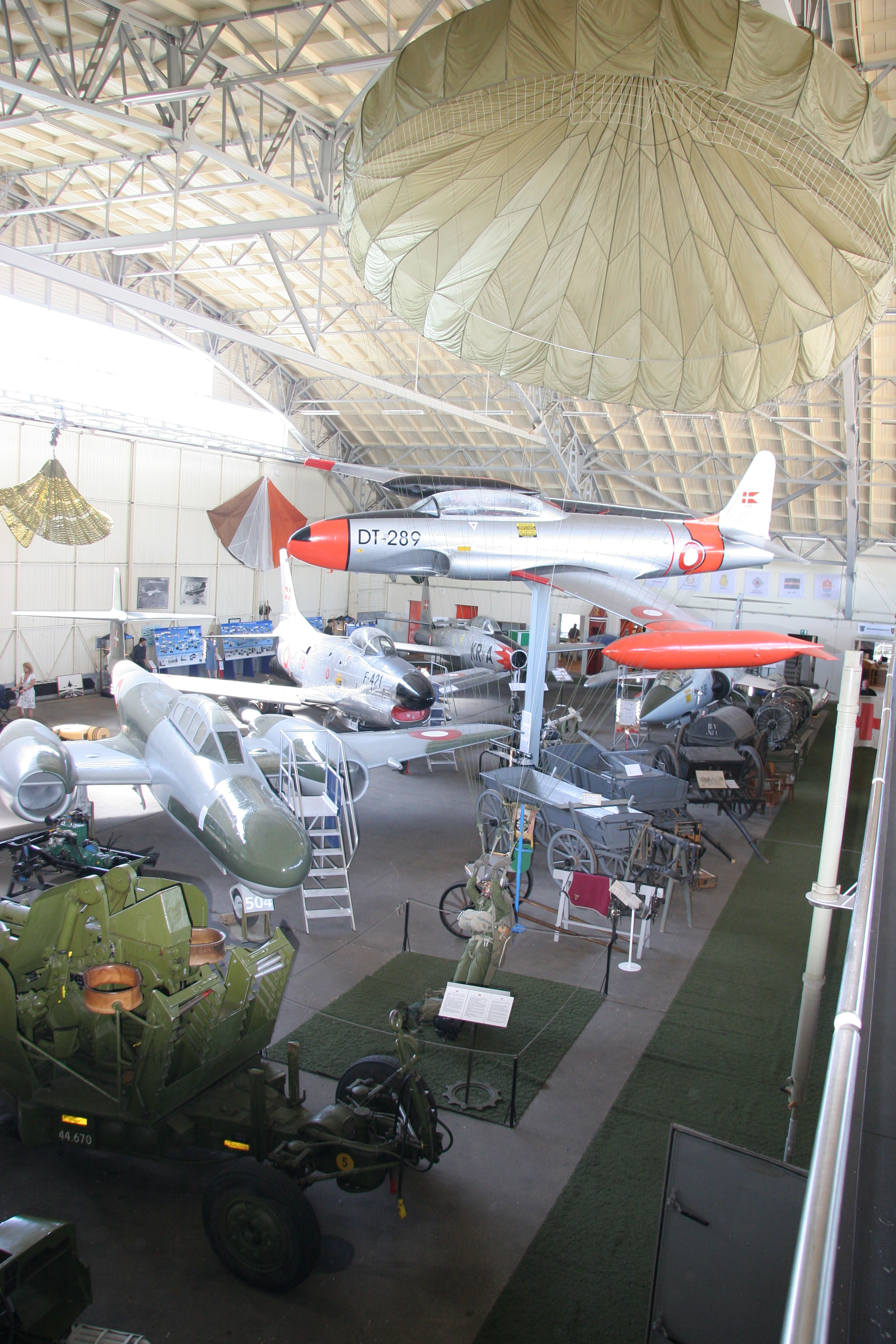
Defence and Garrison Museum, Aalborg

A number of military museums are operational in Denmark, showing exhibitions on military subjects and providing information on Danish or international military history. These museums may be state funded or private foundations.

These military museums may cover one or more services of the Military of Denmark, which comprises: the Army, Air Force, Navy, and the Home Guard.

== List of museums ==
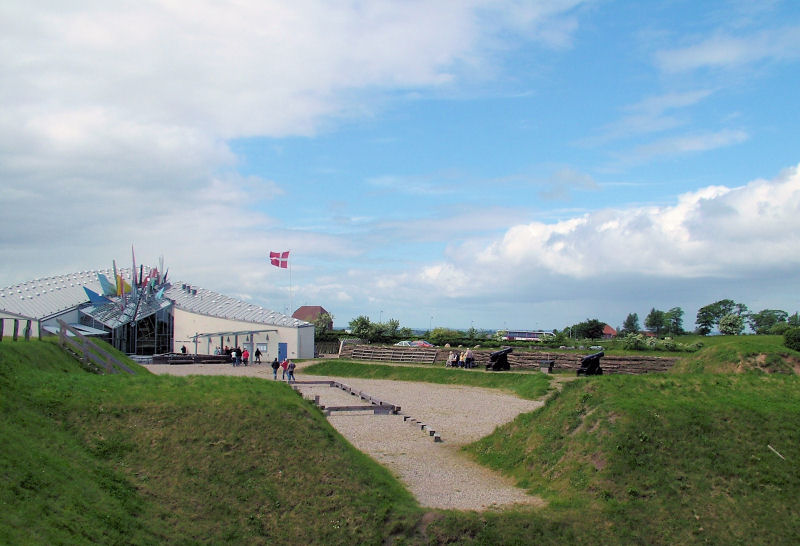
History Centre Dybbøl Banke, Southern Jutland

- Aalborg Søfarts- og Marinemuseum
- Arms Museum at Egholm Castle
- Bornholm's Defence Museum
- Danish War Museum
- Defence and Garrison Museum
- Denmark's Air Force Museum
- Frøslev Prison Camp Museum
- Hanstholm Fortress
- History Centre Dybbøl Banke
- Home Guard Museum, Frøslev
- Livgardens Historiske Samling
- Panzer & Artillery Museum
- Panzermuseum East
- Royal Danish Arsenal Museum
- Royal Danish Naval Museum
- Royal Life Guards Museum
- Sea War Museum Jutland
- Skagen Bunker Museum
