= Hawker Hunter in service with Swiss Air Force =

British fighter jet in Swiss Air Force

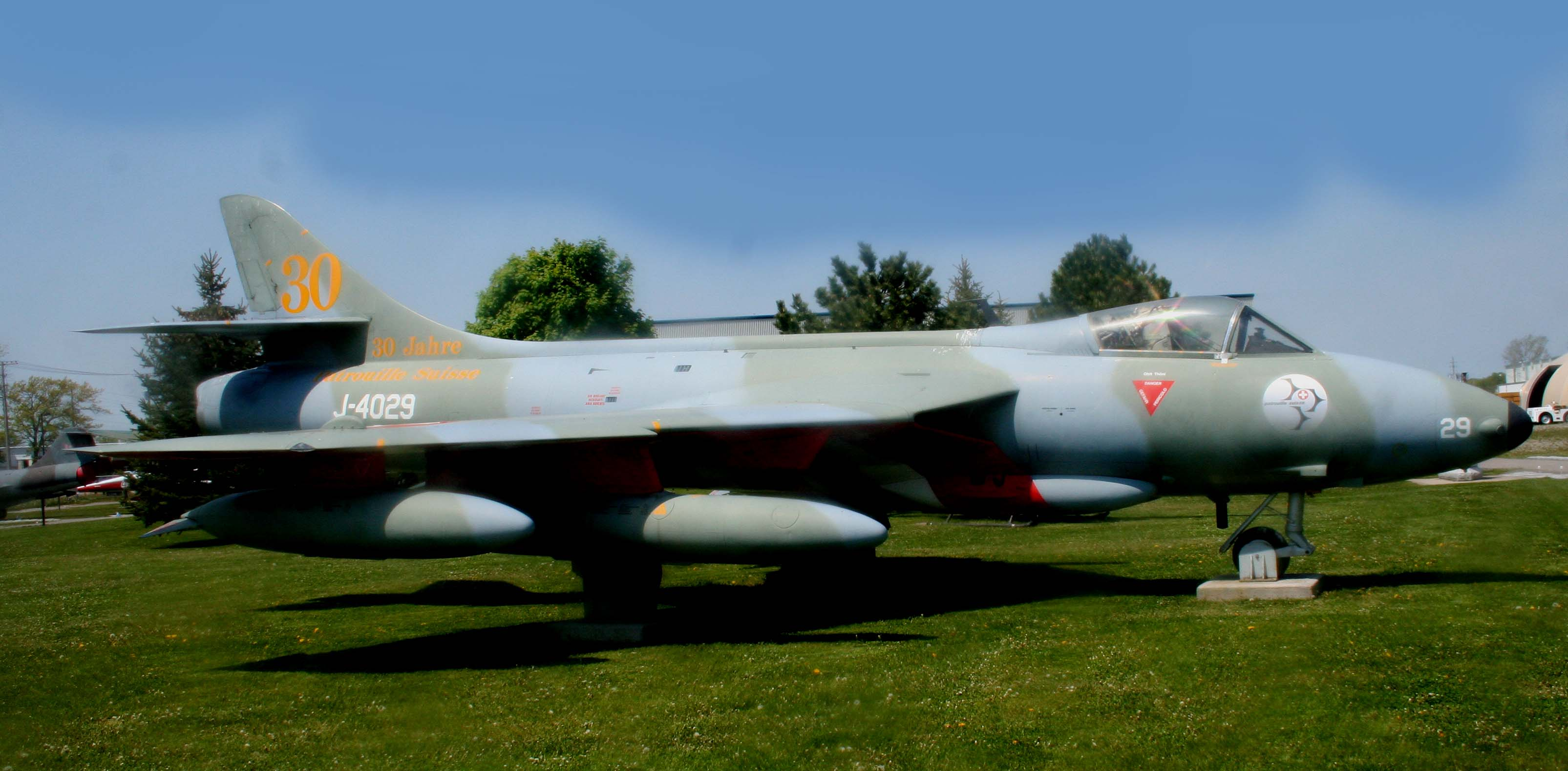
Hawker Hunter F.58A J-4029, at the RCAF Museum, Trenton, Ontario, Canada, circa 2007. Note the RWR bulges in the nose.

The Hawker Hunter had a very long career in Swiss Air Force from the late 1950s until they were retired in 1994. The Swiss Air Force operated 160 aircraft, both new and second-hand. The Hunter was upgraded several times and was used mainly as an attack aircraft by militia squadrons in the last decades of its service life. The retired aircraft had a ready market as a warbird and for use in target facilities operations.

== Selection and deliveries ==
In 1957, the Swiss Air Force evaluated several aircraft for a prospective purchase; competitors included the North American F-86 Sabre, the Folland Gnat, and the Hawker Hunter. Switzerland was also conducting an independent project to produce an aircraft, the FFA P-16. Swiss officials responded positively to the Hunter, thus an extensive evaluation was conducted in Switzerland with two loaned aircraft. In January 1958, Switzerland chose to place an order for 100 Hunters, similar to the Royal Air Force Hunter F.6, to replace the existing fleet of de Havilland Vampires; further development of the indigenous P-16 was discontinued.

The first 12 Hawker were F.Mk 6s formerly in service with the RAF, and were upgraded to Mk.58 standard. Further aircraft deliveries were straight from Hawker's production line, the deliveries took place from 3 April 1958 to 1 April 1960. Swiss adaptions included new radio equipment, and the adaption of outboard pylons for the carriage of 400 kilogram (880 pound) bombs. Hunters were then operated as interceptors with a secondary ground-attack role, the outboard pylons having been modified to carry two AIM-9 Sidewinder air-to-air missiles.

The Hunter survived the procurement efforts of several aircraft promising to be superior; in the case of the Dassault Mirage III this was due to excessive cost overruns and poor project management. A second competition between the Mirage III, Fiat G.91YS (a proposed variant for Switzerland, equipped with two extra Sidewinder missile pylons) and the A-7G Corsair II concluded without any contract being awarded.

== Upgrades ==
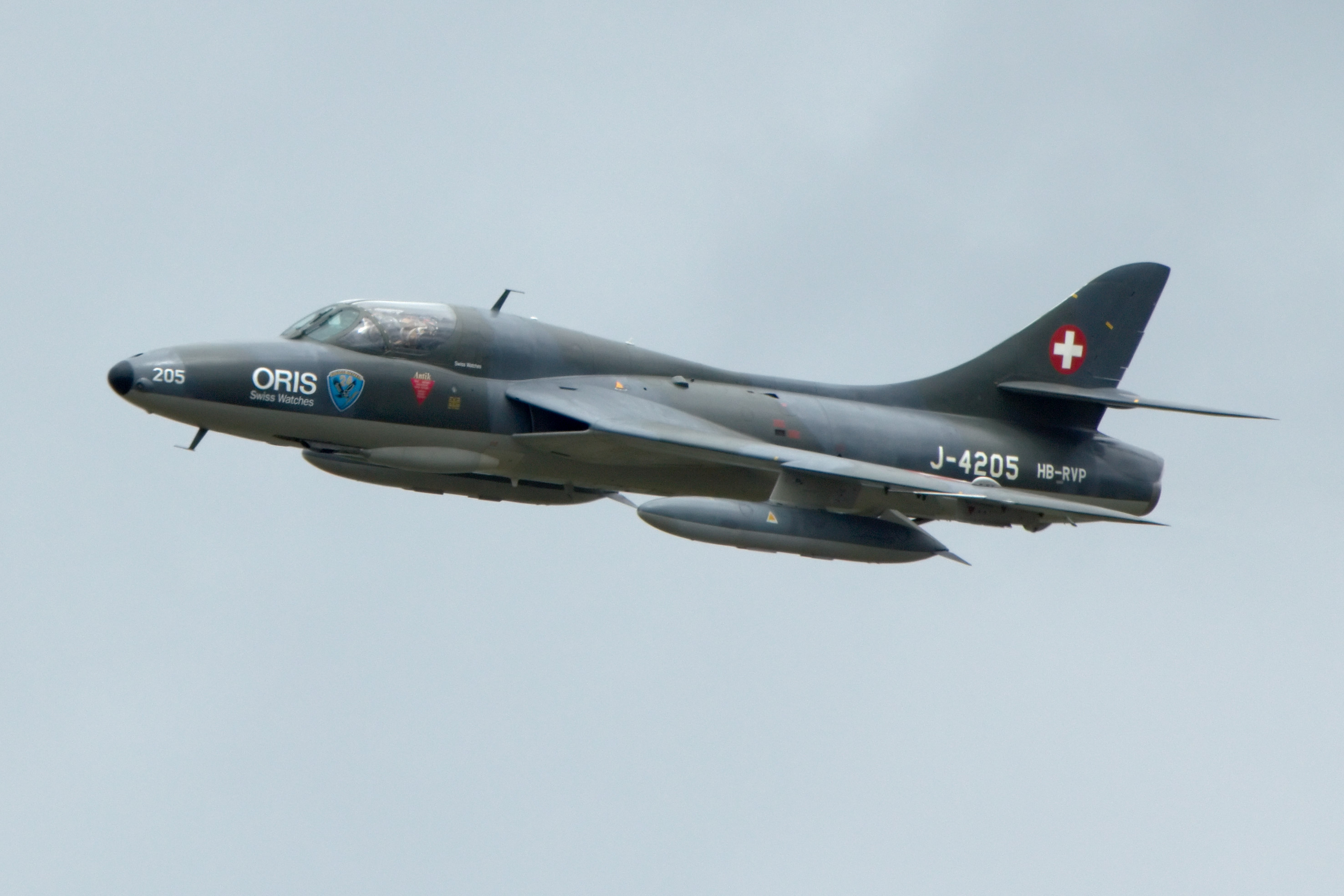
A rare T.68 dual-seat Hunter, Berlin 2010

The Swiss Hunters had some upgrades during their service lives, known as KAWEST (from Kampfwertsteigerung - German: "Increased Operational Performance"). In 1963, the Sidewinder missile was added to enhance the Hunter's air-to-air combat capability. Operationally, Swiss Hunters could be armed with napalm bombs in addition to conventional loadouts. Another program of upgrades, under the name 'Hunter 80', was carried out in the early 1980s which added chaff/flare dispensers, a radar warning receiver, and AGM-65B Maverick capability.

== Service ==
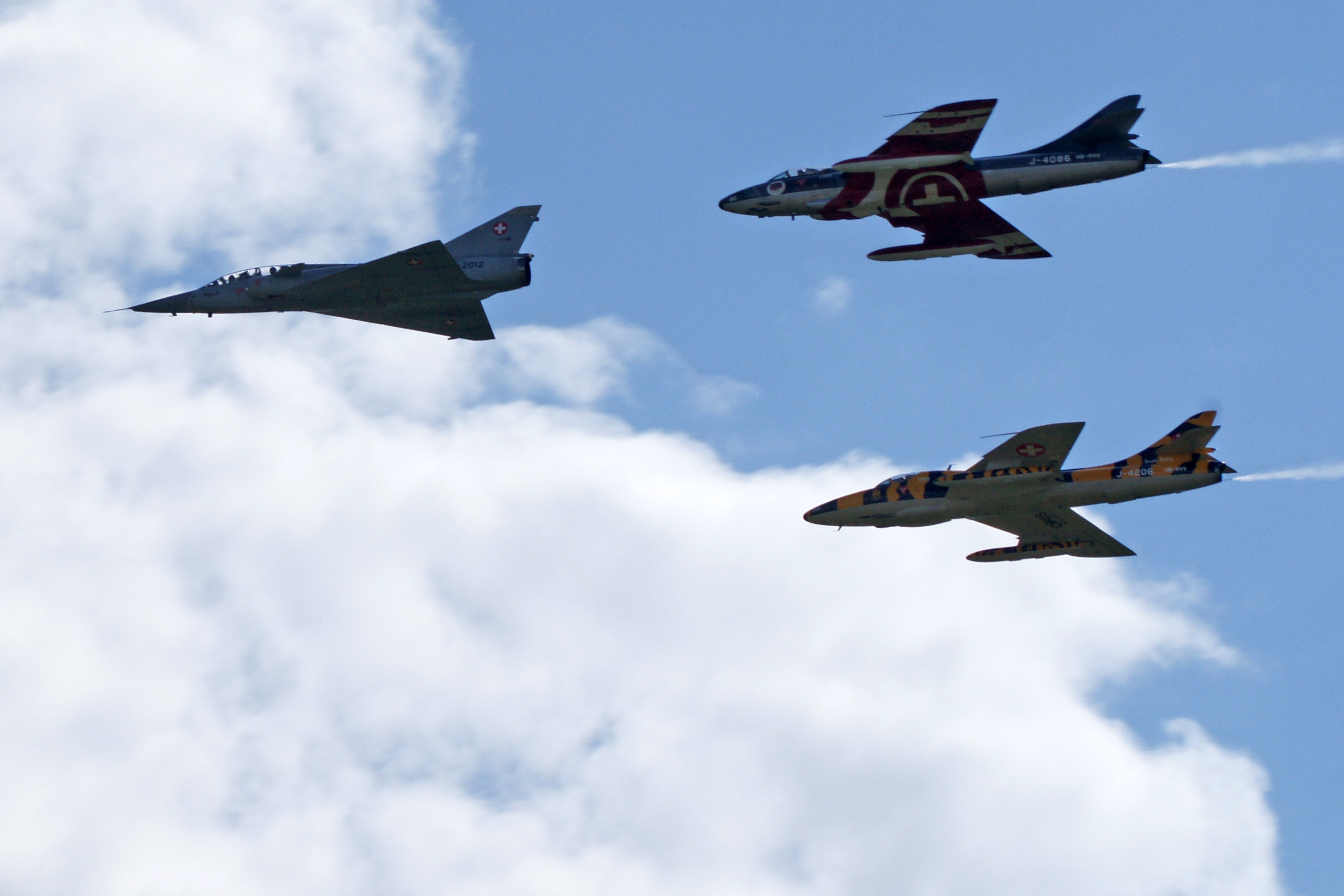
Hunters and Mirage flying in close formation

To supplement the Hunter's interception capabilities, Switzerland purchased a surface-to-air missile (SAM) defence system from the United Kingdom, closely based on the Bristol Bloodhound II. High-altitude air defence was maintained by these SAM batteries and Dassault Mirage III fighters, while medium-to-lower altitudes were patrolled by the Hunters.

In case of unserviceable airstrips, Swiss Air Force Jets would take off from adjacent highways, using them as improvised runways. In 1991, during a major training exercise involving eight Hunter Mk.58s and eight F-5s, up to 4 kilometers of guard rails had to be removed from public roads to enable aircraft operations. Typically, Switzerland maintained about 150 Hunters in an operational flight-ready condition.

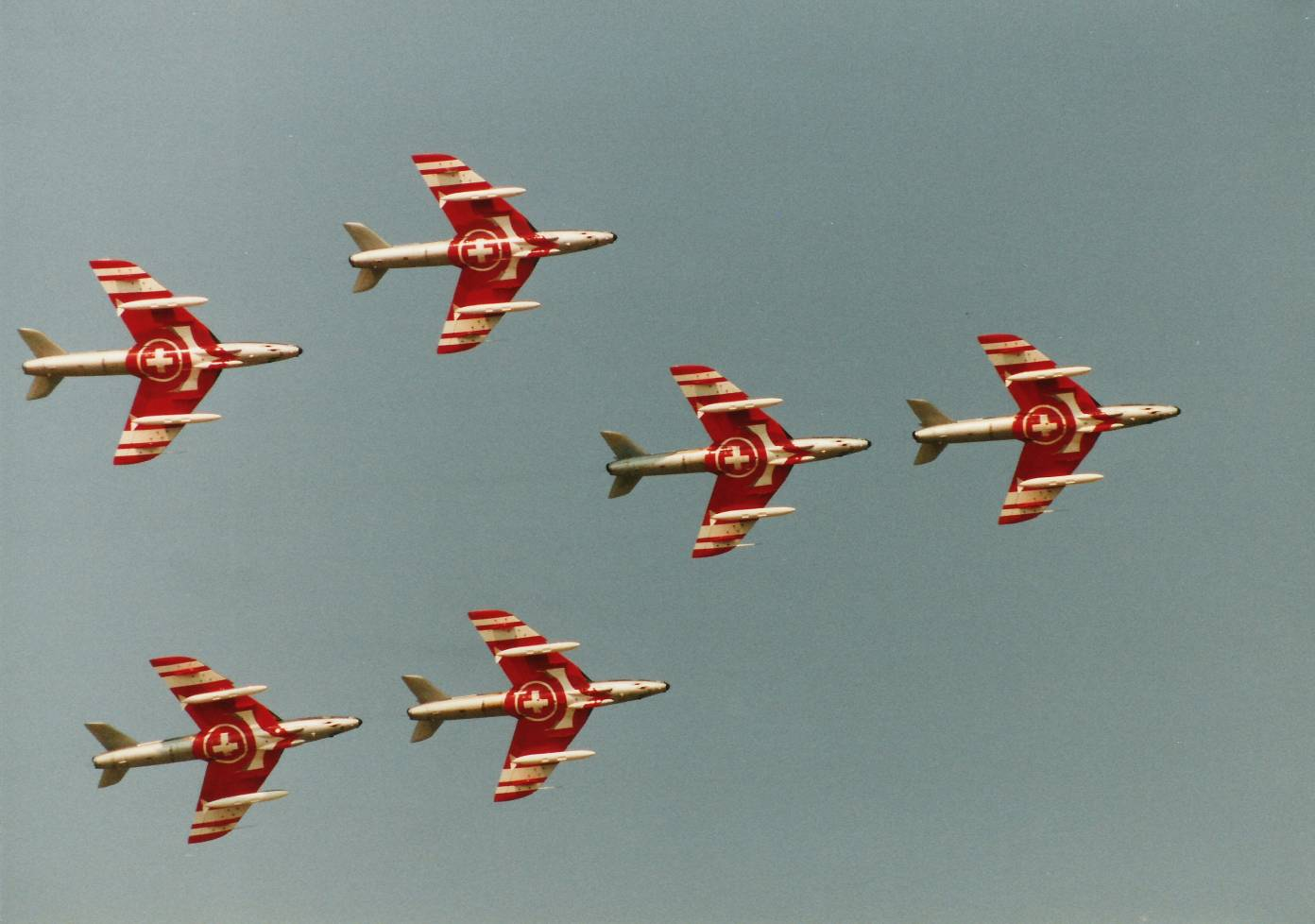
Patrouille Suisse, Payerne, 1991

The Patrouille Suisse flight demonstration team flew the Hawker Hunter for several decades. Squadron aircraft were fitted with smoke generators on the engine exhausts and, later on, were painted in a distinctive red-and-white livery. The group officially formed on 22 August 1964, and used the Hunter as its display aircraft until it was withdrawn from use in 1994.

By 1975, plans emerged to replace the Hunter in the air-to-air role with a more modern fighter, the Northrop F-5E Tiger II. The Hunter continued its service in the Swiss Air Force after the introduction of the F-5; similar to the RAF's own operations, the Hunter became the primary ground attack fighter, and held this role for two further decades until Switzerland purchased 32 McDonnell Douglas F/A-18 Hornets in the late 1990s. The Swiss Air Force lost the capability to carry out air-to-ground operations when the Hunters were withdrawn from service.

In 1990, there were still nine squadrons equipped with 130 Hunters: the 2nd at Ulrichen, 3rd at Ambri, 5th at Raron, 7th at Interlaken, 9th at Raron, 15th at St.Stephan, 20th at Mollis, 21st at Turtman, 22nd at Ulrichen and St.Stephan (with T.68s). They were almost the half of the first line (19 squadrons, 6 with F-5s and 3 with Dassault Mirage IIIS/RS), while one more aircraft was used by the experimental aircraft unit.

The Hunter F.Mk.58A were phased out first, as there were problems with the wing's structure. The last Swiss Hunters were phased out of service in 1994.

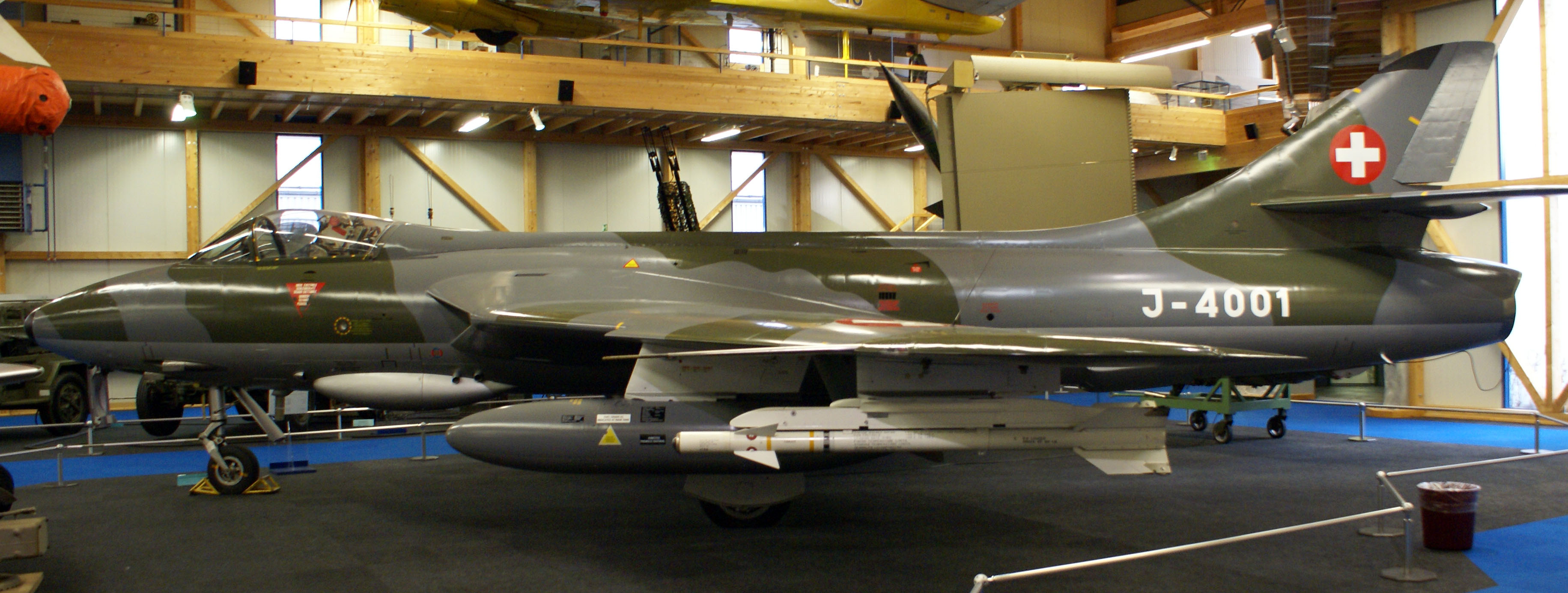
The first Swiss Hunter J-4001, armed with Sidewinders

Overall, the Swiss Hunters had a very active career lasting over 30 years. Many of first contract Hunters flew 2,400-2,500 hours, but several of them logged 2,700 hours and few 2,800. The most active was J-4023 which logged 2,860 hours with 1,567 landings (the average mission time seems over 1-1.5 hours, despite the short endurance of the Hunter). The first batch was the most used, while the 1970 fighters/trainers topped around 1,200-1,500 hours each. As British aviation writer John Lake put it: "If the Hunter had not existed, the Swiss would have had to invent it".

A near-incident happened when a Swiss pilot managed to land his Hunter in thick fog, landing with only 50 litres of fuel remaining.

During training, Hunters would typically carry only a half load of ammunition for the Aden cannon to allow for spent cartridges to be retained rather than ejected.

== Retirement and preservation ==
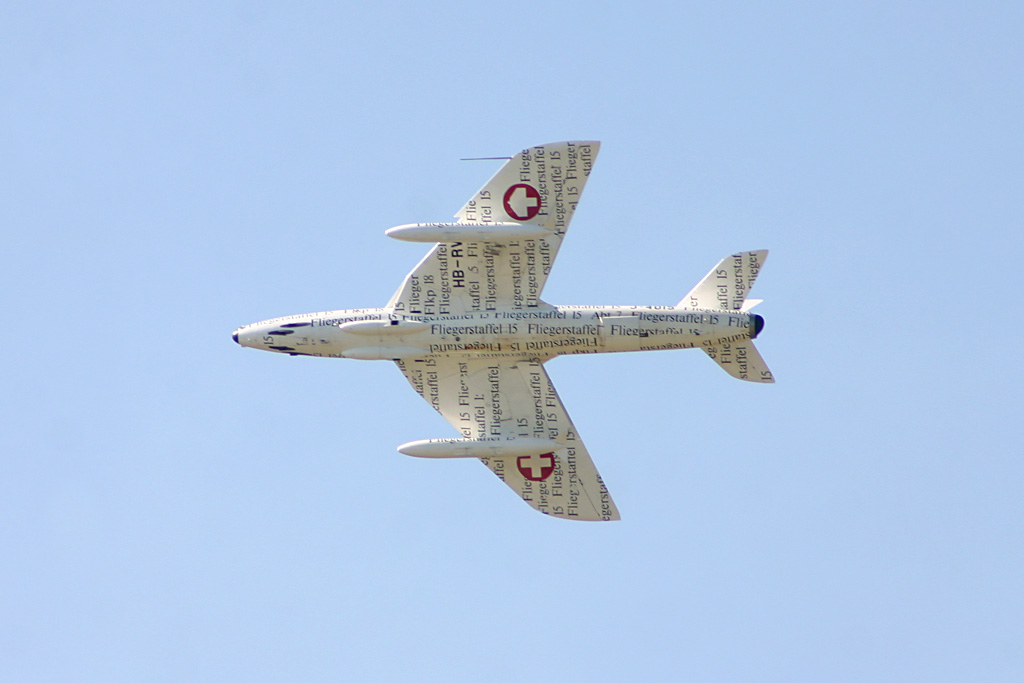
J-4040 'Papyrus' at Payerne, 2004

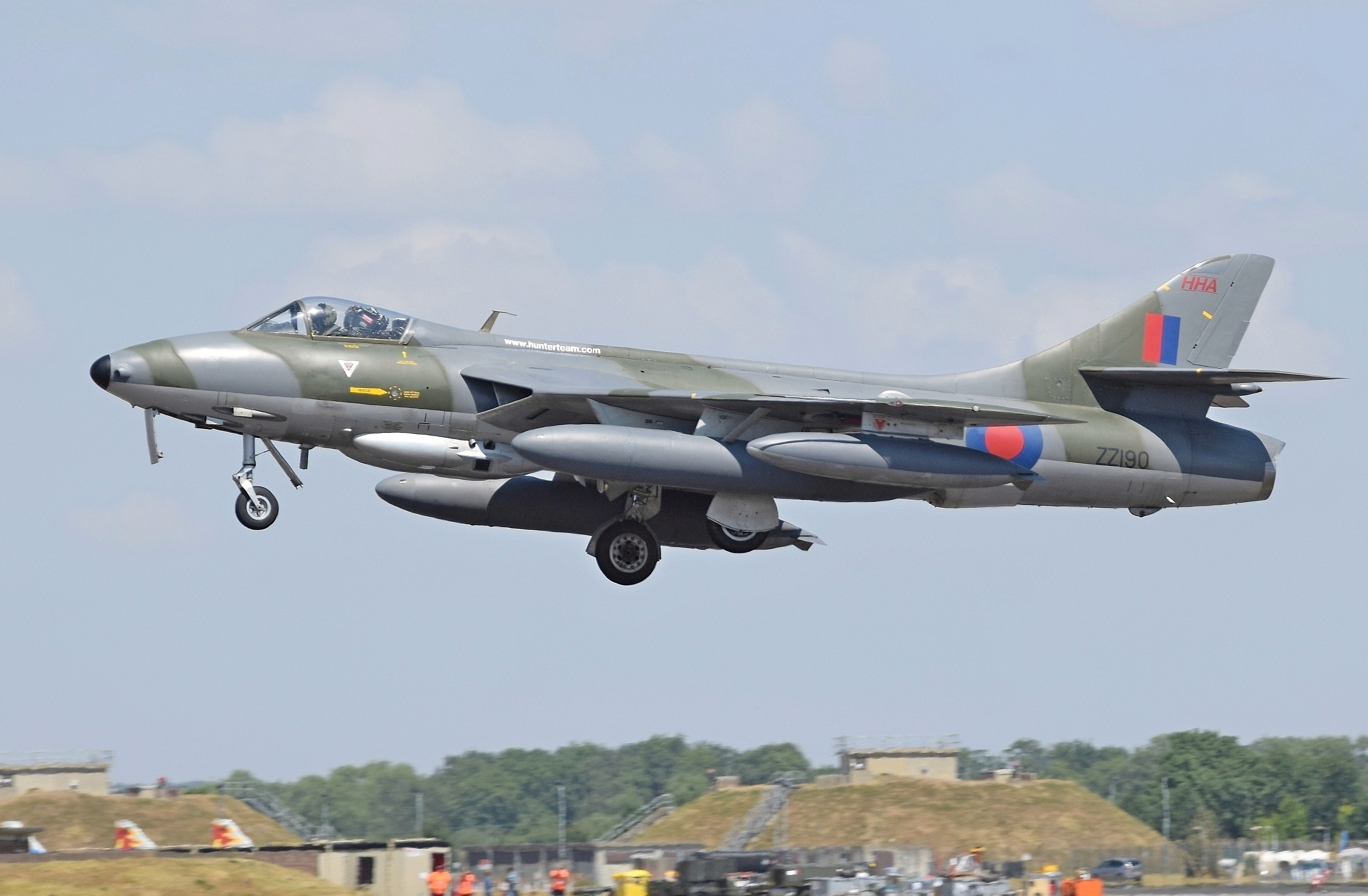
ex-Swiss Air Force Hawker Hunter F.58 of Hawker Hunter Aviation arrives at the 2018 RIAT, England

Many Swiss Hunters were conserved, including some that were flight-worthy. Several Hunters are used in North America; one is used by a private contractor for the French Navy. Others are owned by aviation companies like ATAC and Hunter Aviation International Inc, Newark, United States. A British company, the Hunter team, claims its fleet is capable of operating at speed up to Mach 0.95, up -3.75/+7.5G for 90 minutes up to 185 km from their base, simulating air-to-air and air-to-surface threats for military customers, at a low operational cost compared to modern fighters. Lortie Aviation is another operators of ex-Swiss Hunters.

There is also a Hunter Swiss civil association, Amici dell'Hunter, that perform acrobatic activities. Some of the last Swiss Hunters are available for jet-tourism; one operator charges almost 7000 euros for a 40-minute flight.

== Bibliography ==
- Condon, Peter D. Flying the Classic Learjet. Peter D. Condon, 2007. ISBN 0-646-48135-5.
- Lombardi, Fiona. The Swiss Air Power: Wherefrom? Whereto? Hochschulverlag AG, 2007. ISBN 3-7281-3099-0.
- Lewis, Peter (October 2021). "Hunter 80, Pt 2: The AGM-65B Maverick". The Aviation Historian (37): 30–41. ISSN 2051-1930.
- Mason, Francis K. (1985). Hawker Hunter: Biography of a thoroughbred. Wellingborough, Northampton, UK: Patrick Stephens Limited. ISBN 0-85059-784-6.
- Martin, Stephen. The Economics of Offsets: Defence Procurement and Countertrade. Routledge, 1996. ISBN 3-7186-5782-1.
- Senior, Tim. The Air Forces Book of the F/A-18 Hornet. Zenith Imprint, 2003. ISBN 0-946219-69-9.
- Anselmino, Federico: 'Fliegertruppen', A&D Magazine, Rome, June 1990 pp. 21–23.
- The Illustrated Encyclopedia of Aircraft, Aerospace Publishing Ltd. 1982. pp. 244–252.
- War Machine Encyclopedia. De Agostini, Novara, 1985. pp .1124-27.
