= SAI KZ I =

Sport aircraft built in Denmark in 1937

KZ I
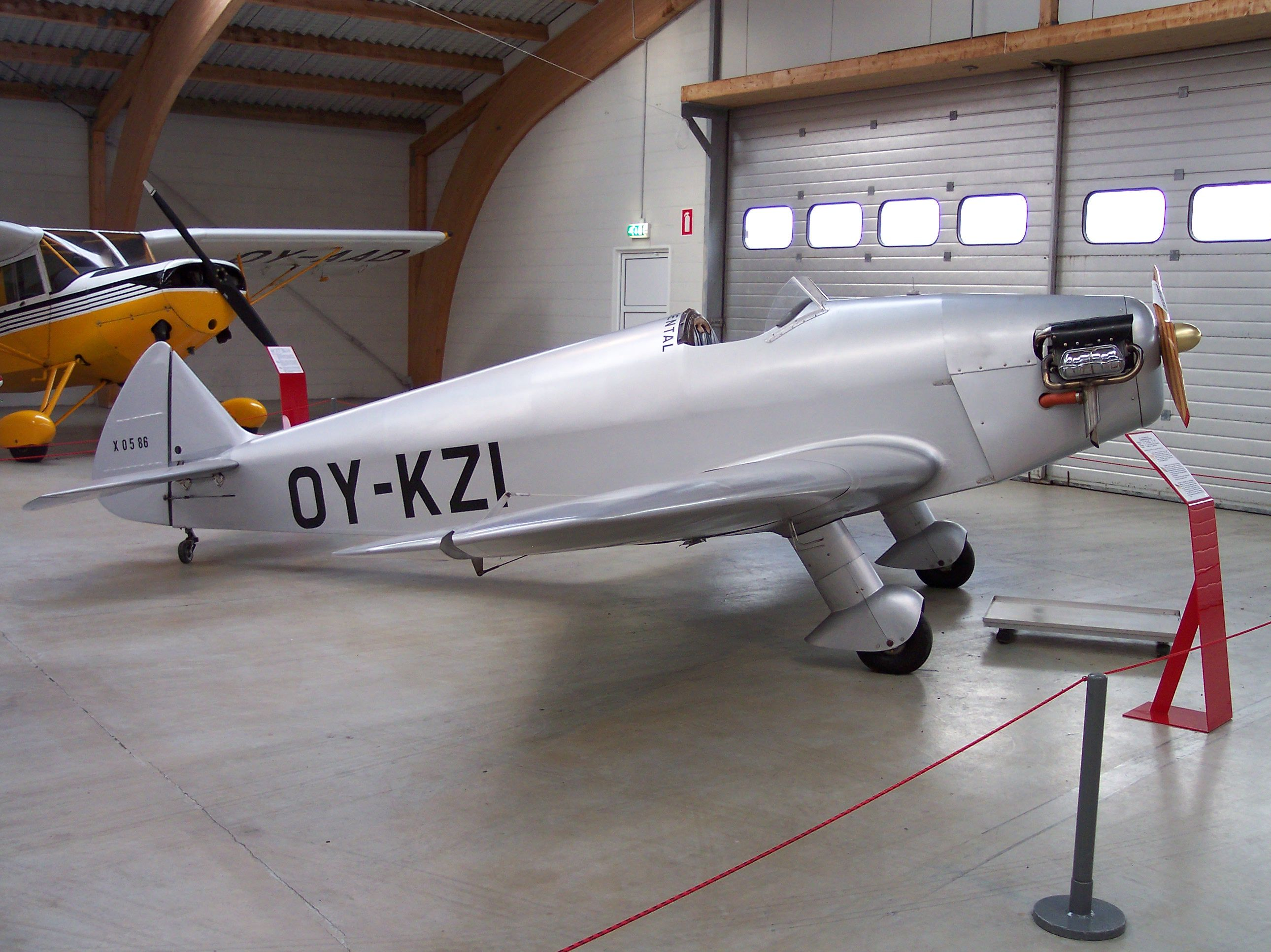
- KZ I replica in Danmarks Flymuseum

General information
- Type: Sport aircraft
- National origin: Denmark
- Manufacturer: Skandinavisk Aero Industri
- Designer: Viggo Kramme and Karl Gustav Zeuthen
- Number built: 1

History
- First flight: 24 February 1937

The SAI KZ I was a sport aircraft built in Denmark in 1937, the first aircraft built by the Kramme & Zeuthen firm.

== Design and development ==
The KZ I was a low-wing cantilever monoplane of conventional design, with fixed tailwheel undercarriage and an open cockpit with a single seat. Construction throughout was of wood.

Only a single KZ I was constructed, and it disappeared during the course of World War II. During the 1970s, a flying replica was built, with work started by Gunnar Fjord Christensen in 1972 and sold to the Danmarks Flymuseum in 1977. The completed aircraft, powered by a more powerful but heavier 50 hp (37 kW), 1.5 L (92 cu in) Volkswagen flat-four engine, flew for the first time on 20 November 1988 and in 2008 remains part of the museum's collection.

== Specifications ==
Data from Danmarks Flymuseum : KZ I.

General characteristics

- Crew: 1
- Wingspan: 7.2 m (23 ft 7 in)
- Wing area: 8.4 m^{2} (90 sq ft)
- Airfoil: root: NACA 23018; tip: NACA 23009
- Empty weight: 192 kg (423 lb)
- Gross weight: 325 kg (717 lb)
- Powerplant: 1 × ABC Scorpion two cylinder air-cooled horizontally-opposed piston engine, 28 kW (38 hp)
- Propellers: 2-bladed fixed-pitch propeller

Performance

- Maximum speed: 180 km/h (110 mph, 97 kn)
- Landing speed: 60 km/h (37 mph; 32 kn)
- Cruise speed: 160 km/h (99 mph, 86 kn)
- Service ceiling: 5,000 m (16,000 ft)
