= SAI KZ III =

Danish light utility aircraft

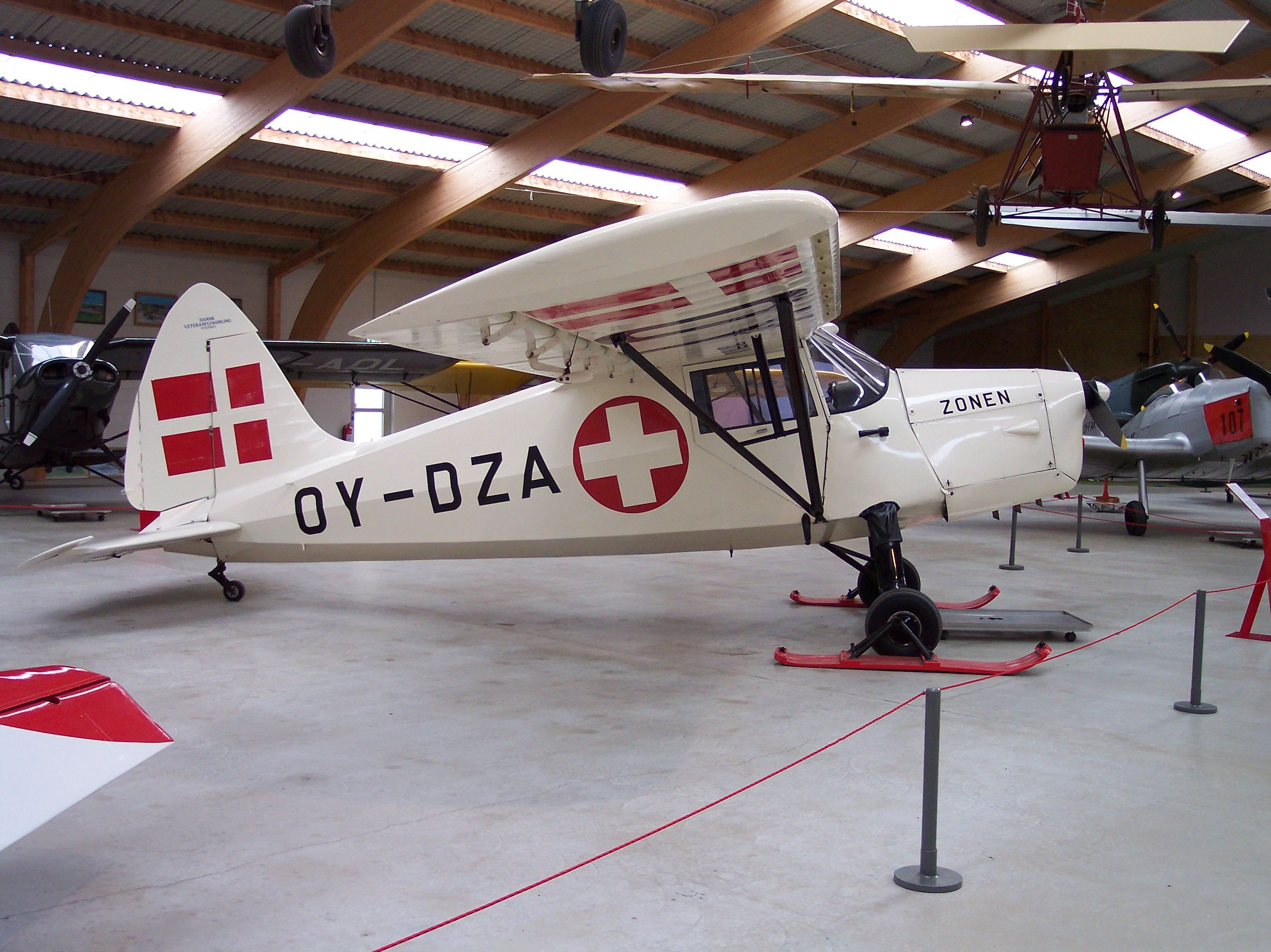
- KZ III air ambulance at The Danish Collection of Vintage Aircraft

General information
- Type: utility aircraft
- Manufacturer: SAI
- Primary user: Denmark
- Number built: 66

History
- Manufactured: 1946–1951
- First flight: 11 September 1944

The SAI KZ III Lærke ("lark") was a Danish light utility aircraft used by the Danish Air Ambulance Service and Danish Air Force.

The first KIII was built during the German occupation of Denmark and first flew on 11 September 1944. With German permission it was transferred to the Redningskorpset (Rescue Service). A second war-time example was smuggled to Sweden. The two wartime aircraft had 90 hp (67 kW) Gipsy Minor I engines.

The KIII had a high wing braced by V-struts to the lower fuselage. Its fuselage had a steel tube structure and, like the rest of the aircraft, had fabric covering. Its two front seats shared dual controls. Slotted flaps and fixed, full span slots provided a gentle stall.

64 were built post-war with 100 hp (75 kW) Blackburn Cirrus Minor II engines. Many of these went to flying clubs, mostly in Denmark but with sales to several near-by countries. A few went further, one to Singapore and another to India, where its airframe still survives.

== Operators ==
=== Civil operators ===
Denmark

- Danish Air Ambulance Service

=== Military operators ===
Denmark

- Royal Danish Air Force.

== Specifications ==
Data from Jane's all the World's Aircraft 1947.

General characteristics

- Crew: two
- Length: 6.6 m (21 ft 8 in)
- Wingspan: 9.6 m (31 ft 6 in)
- Height: 2.1 m (6 ft 11 in)
- Wing area: 13 m^{2} (140 sq ft)
- Airfoil: NACA 23012
- Empty weight: 368 kg (811 lb)
- Max takeoff weight: 706 kg (1,556 lb) with auxiliary tank full, 34 kg (75 lb) and extra 21 kg (46 lb) luggage
- Fuel capacity: 68.2 L (18.0 US gal; 15.0 imp gal) in main fuselage tank and 41 L (11 US gal; 9.0 imp gal) in auxiliary tank
- Powerplant: 1 × Blackburn Cirrus Minor II four cylinder inverted air-cooled in-line piston engine, 75 kW (100 hp)
- Propellers: 2-bladed Weybridge, 1.9 m (6 ft 3 in) diameter wooden fixed pitch propeller

Performance

- Maximum speed: 185 km/h (115 mph, 100 kn) at sea level
- Cruise speed: 170 km/h (110 mph, 92 kn) at 2,200 rpm
- Landing speed: 55 km/h (34 mph; 30 kn)
- Range: 500 km (310 mi, 270 nmi)
- Ferry range: 805 km (500 mi, 435 nmi)
- Service ceiling: 4,115 m (13,501 ft)
- Maximum glide ratio: 1:8 (flaps up); 1:5 (flaps down)
- Rate of climb: 3.6 m/s (700 ft/min)
- Wing loading: 48.83 kg/m^{2} (10.00 lb/sq ft)
- Power/mass: 9.72 kg/kW (16 lb/hp)
- Take-off run: 70 m (230 ft)
- Landing run: 50 m (160 ft)

== See also ==
Related development

- SAI KZ VII

Aircraft of comparable role, configuration, and era

- RWD-13
- Piper PA-15 Vagabond
