= KZ =

KZ, K-Z, Kz, or kz may refer to:

== Arts and media ==
- K-Z, a 1972 Italian documentary film
- Kuhns Zeitschrift, the former colloquial name for the linguistics journal Historische Sprachforschung
- KZ (KreedZ), a game mode in Counter-Strike

== People ==
- KZ Okpala, American basketball player
- KZ Tandingan (born 1992), Filipino singer
- KZ, member of the Japanese music group Livetune

== Places ==
- Ka'ba-ye Zartosht, or Kaabah of Zoroaster, a 5th-century BCE tower at Naqsh-e Rustam, an archaeological site in Iran
- Kazakhstan (ISO 3166 code: KZ)
- KidZania
- KZ, Konzentrationslager, the German term for Nazi concentration camps (1933–1945)

== Transportation ==
- Nippon Cargo Airlines (IATA airline code: KZ)
- Kramme & Zeuthen, Danish aeroplane builders, see Skandinavisk Aero Industri
- Kuaizhou, a Chinese family of carrier rockets
- Toyota KZ engine, a diesel engine made for passenger cars

== Other uses ==
- .kz, the Internet country code top-level domain for Kazakhstan
- kz (digraph), in Esperanto
- Angolan kwanza, the currency of Angola (symbol Kz)
- Korkine–Zolotarev lattice basis reduction algorithm
- Kolmogorov–Zurbenko filter
- KZ (Knowledge Zenith), a Chinese manufacturer of IEMs
