= Skandinavisk Aero Industri =

Danish manufacturer of aeroplanes

Skandinavisk Aero Industri A/S
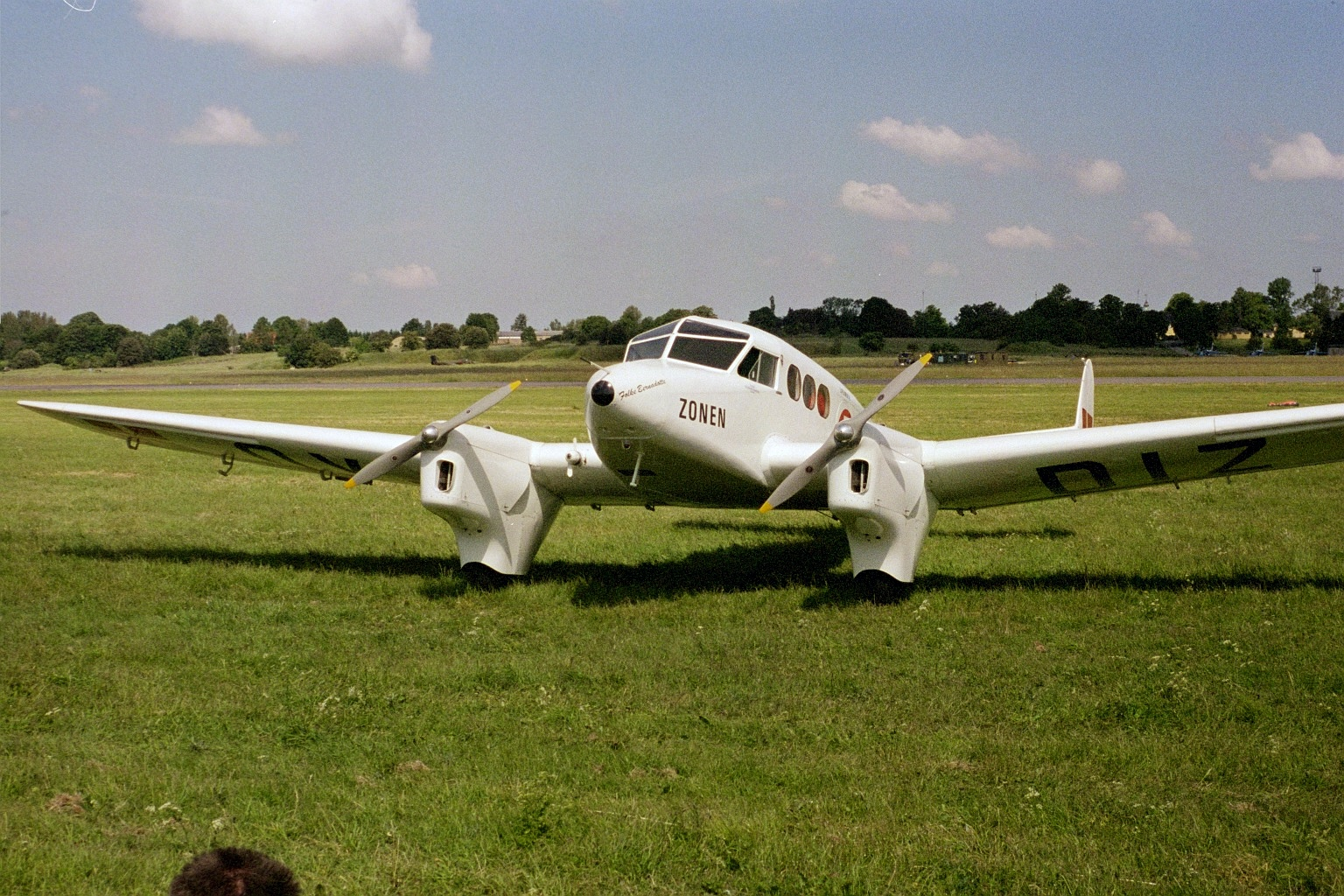
- An SAI KZ IV ambulance plane
- Industry: Aerospace
- Founded: 1937; 88 years ago in Copenhagen
- Founders: Viggo Kramme; Karl Gustav Zeuthen
- Defunct: 1954
- Fate: Shut down operations due to unprofitability
- Headquarters: Copenhagen, Denmark

Skandinavisk Aero Industri A/S (abbreviated SAI; English: Scandinavian Aero Industries) was a Danish manufacturer of aeroplanes that existed between 1937 and 1954. The company was founded by technician Viggo Kramme (1905–1984) and engineer Karl Gustav Zeuthen (1909–1989) and based in Copenhagen.

The company's aeroplanes were labelled "KZ" for Kramme and Zeuthen, the first being the KZ I from 1937. The KZ IV was built as an ambulance plane for Zone-Redningskorpset and introduced in 1944. Post-war sales never reached the company's expectations, and production turned unprofitable in the early 1950s, driving the company to shut down. In total, about 200 planes were built by the company.

A number of the KZ planes have been preserved. As of 2005, Dansk Veteranflysamling (The Danish Collection of Vintage Aircraft) exhibits a specimen of each of the 11 aircraft models manufactured by the company.

== Aircraft ==
Name	Year	Notes
KZ I	1937	Prototype only; seized by the Germans in World War II
KZ II	1937/38	Three subtypes ("Kupé", "Sport", "Trainer")
KZ G-I	1943	Glider
KZ III	1944	Ambulance plane
KZ IV	1944	Ambulance plane
KZ V	1944	Twin engined short-haul airliner. Cancelled before a prototype could be built
KZ VII	1946	Light utility and trainer aircraft.
KZ VIII	1949	Aerobatic plane
KZ (IX) Ellehammer	1950	Replica of a 1909 Ellehammer plane
KZ X	1951	Artillery observation plane
