= SAI KZ II =

Sport aircraft built in Denmark in 1937

KZ II
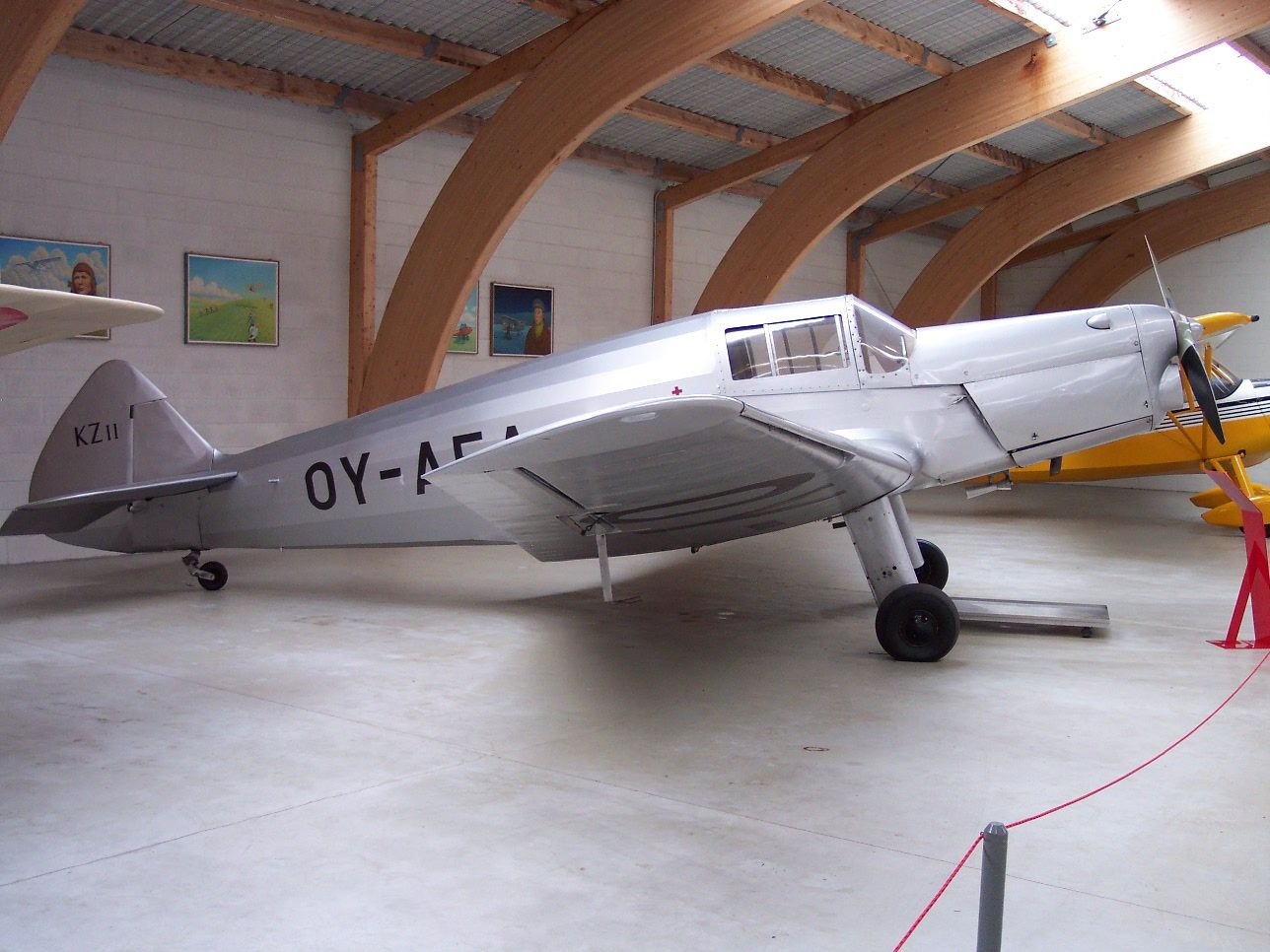
- KZ II Kupé in Danmarks Flymuseum

General information
- Type: Sport aircraft
- National origin: Denmark
- Manufacturer: Skandinavisk Aero Industri
- Designer: Viggo Kramme and Karl Gustav Zeuthen
- Primary user: Danish Air Force
- Number built: 45

History
- First flight: 11 December 1937

The SAI KZ II was a sport aircraft built in Denmark in 1937, produced in three major versions before and after the Second World War.

== Design and development ==
In its original form, designated the Kupé (Danish: "Coupé") it was a low-wing cantilever monoplane of conventional design with fixed tailwheel undercarriage and two seats side by side under an enclosed canopy. The fuselage structure was of steel tube, skinned in plywood and fabric, and the wings were wooden with plywood covering and could be folded back along the fuselage for transport and storage.

This was followed by the aerobatic KZ II Sport with a revised fuselage design, placing the two seats in separate open cockpits in tandem, and a dedicated military trainer version along the same lines, the KZ II Træner ("Trainer"). This latter type was first produced in 1946, as a step towards rebuilding Denmark's air force after the war. They remained in service until 1955, when nine examples were sold into private hands.

In 2008, an example of each variant (including the sole extant KZ II Sport) is preserved in the Danmarks Flymuseum.

== Variants ==
- KZ II Kupé - original version with side-by-side seating under an enclosed canopy and de Havilland Gipsy Minor or Cirrus Minor engine (14 built)
- KZ II Sport - aerobatic version with tandem seating in open cockpits and 78 kW (105 hp) Hirth 504A engine (16 built)
- KZ II Træner - military trainer version similar to KZ II Sport with de Havilland Gipsy Major engine (15 built)

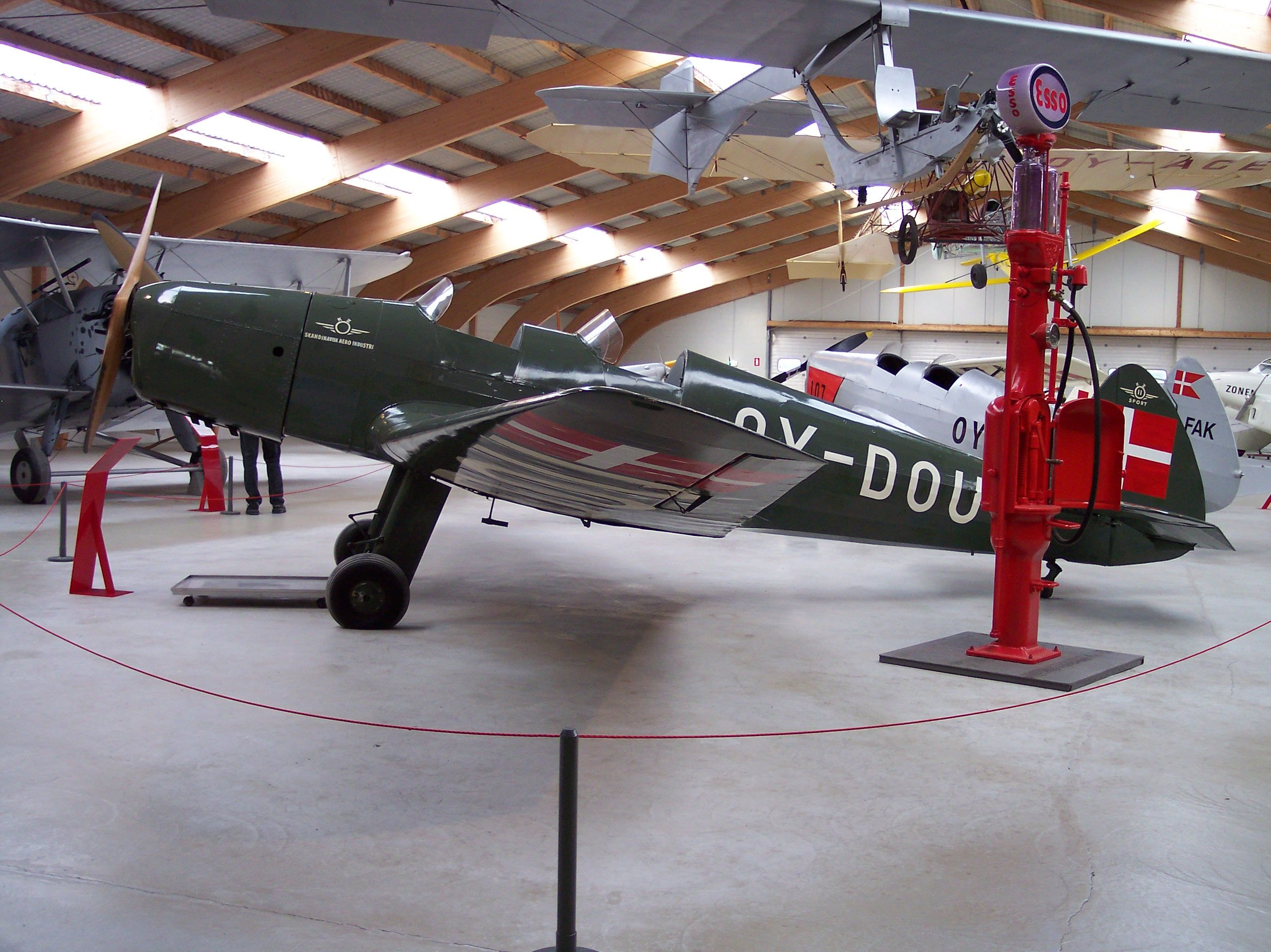
KZ II Sport

== Operators ==
Denmark

- Danish Navy - ordered 4 × KZ II Sport, but these were confiscated by Germany before delivery
- Danish Air Force - 15 × KZ II Træner operated between 1946 and 1955

== Specifications (KZ II Træner) ==
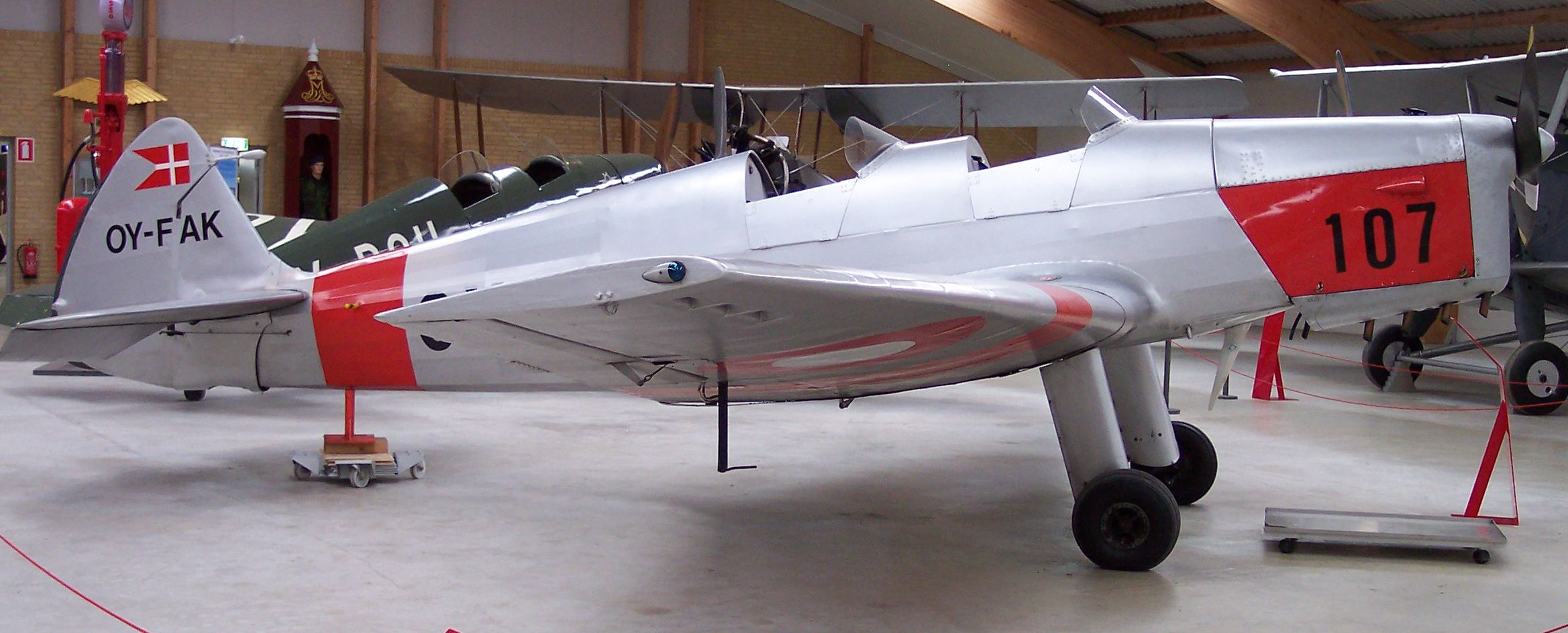
KZ-II Traener

Data from Jane's.

General characteristics

- Crew: 2
- Length: 7.6 m (24 ft 11 in)
- Wingspan: 10.2 m (33 ft 6 in)
- Height: 2.1 m (6 ft 11 in)
- Wing area: 15 m^{2} (160 sq ft)
- Empty weight: 550 kg (1,213 lb)
- Gross weight: 850 kg (1,874 lb) (normal); 775 kg (1,709 lb) (aerobatic)
- Fuel capacity: 110 L (29 US gal; 24 imp gal) in two tanks in the wing centre-section
- Powerplant: 1 × de Havilland Gipsy Major I four cylinder inverted air-cooled in-line piston engine, 108 kW (145 hp)
- Propellers: 2-bladed wooden fixed-pitch airscrew, 2 m (6 ft 7 in) diameter

Performance

- Maximum speed: 235 km/h (146 mph, 127 kn)
- Stall speed: 75 km/h (47 mph, 40 kn)
- Never exceed speed: 350 km/h (220 mph, 190 kn)
- Range: 500 km (310 mi, 270 nmi)
- Ferry range: 805 km (500 mi, 435 nmi)
- Service ceiling: 5,000 m (16,000 ft)
- Rate of climb: 4.50 m/s (885 ft/min)
- Wing loading: 56.6 kg/m^{2} (11.6 lb/sq ft) (normal); 51.6 kg/m^{2} (10.6 lb/sq ft) (aerobatic)
- Power/mass: 7.8 kg/kW (12.9 lb/hp) (normal); 7.2 kg/kW (11.8 lb/hp) (aerobatic)
- Take-off run: 120 m (390 ft)
- Landing run: 130 m (430 ft)

== See also ==
Related lists

- List of aircraft of World War II
