= SAI KZ VII =

Danish light utility aircraft, 1946

KZ VII Lærke
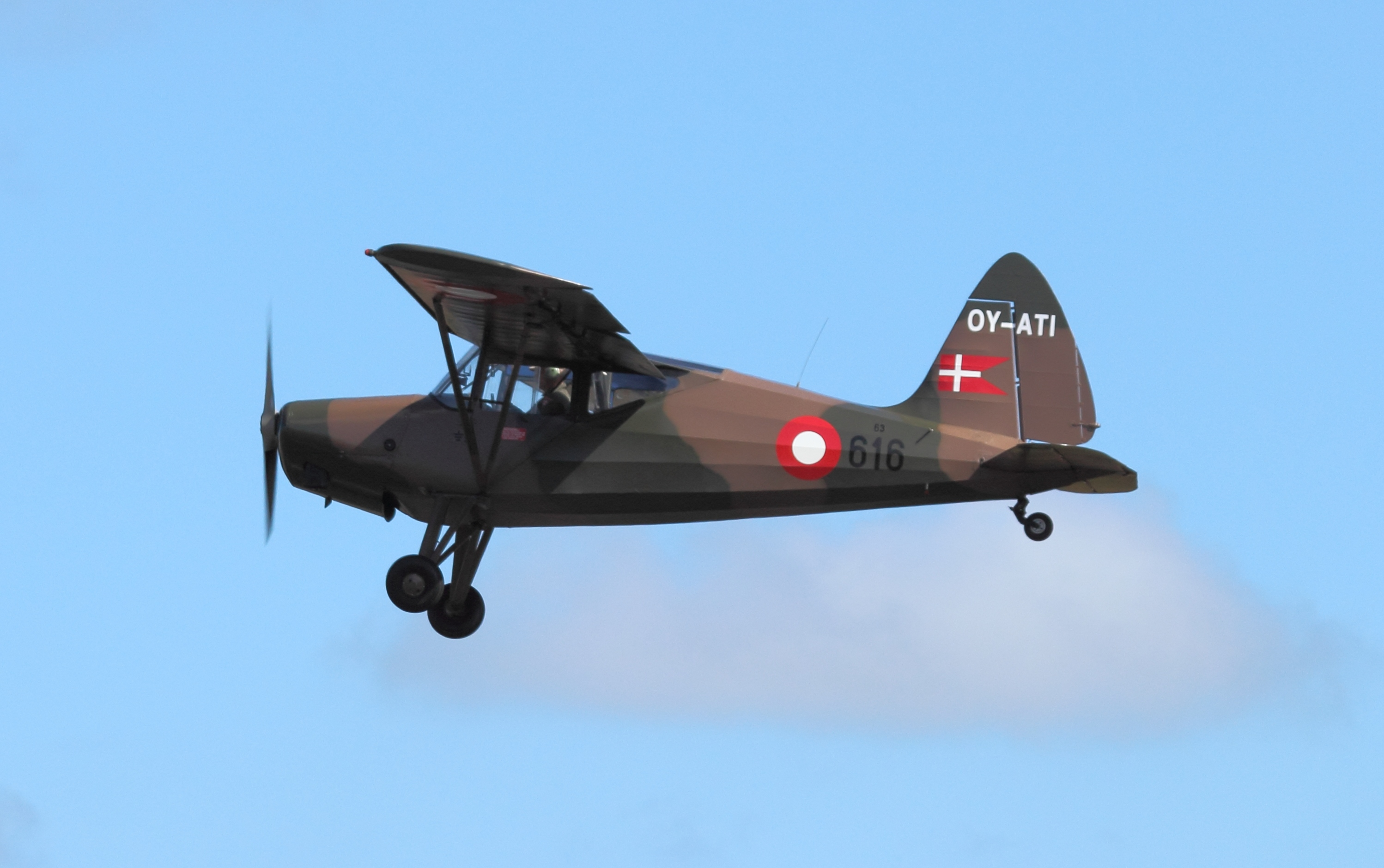
- KZ VII Lærke in flight at Danish Air Show 2014

General information
- Type: Utility aircraft
- National origin: Denmark
- Manufacturer: Skandinavisk Aero Industri
- Designer: Viggo Kramme and Karl Gustav Zeuthen
- Primary user: Danish Air Force
- Number built: 56

History
- First flight: 11 November 1946

The SAI KZ VII Lærke (Danish: "Lark") was a light utility aircraft built in Denmark shortly after the Second World War. Based on the SAI KZ III air ambulance, the KZ VII was a strut-braced, high-wing monoplane of conventional design with an enclosed cabin for four seats. Fifty-six aircraft were built, and another 22 partially completed aircraft were destroyed in a factory fire in 1947. The Danish Air Force operated 10 of the type as trainers between 1950 and 1977.

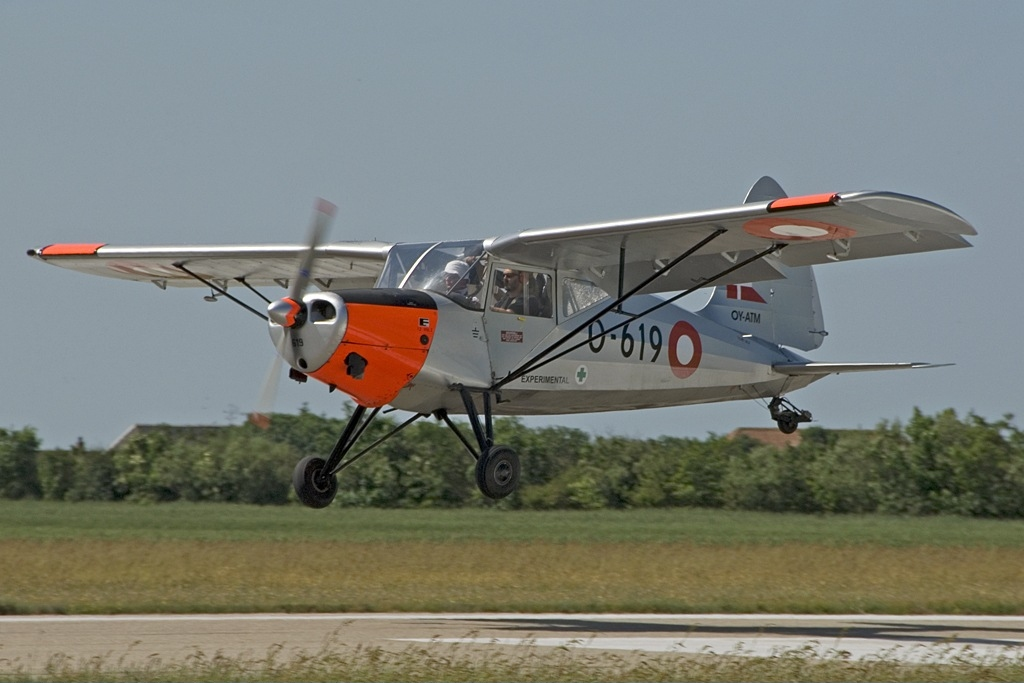

== Operators ==
Denmark

- Royal Danish Air Force

Germany

- OLT Express Germany

== Specifications ==
Data from Jane's All The World's Aircraft 1953–54.

General characteristics

- Crew: 2
- Capacity: 2 passengers
- Length: 6.56 m (21 ft 6 in)
- Wingspan: 9.6 m (31 ft 6 in)
- Height: 2.1 m (6 ft 11 in)
- Wing area: 13 m^{2} (140 sq ft)
- Airfoil: NACA 23012
- Empty weight: 464 kg (1,023 lb)
- Gross weight: 867 kg (1,911 lb)
- Fuel capacity: 110 L (29 US gal; 24 imp gal)
- Powerplant: 1 × Continental C125 6-cylinder air-cooled horizontally-opposed piston engine, 93 kW (125 hp)
- Propellers: 2-bladed, 1.9 m (6 ft 3 in) diameter fixed-pitch propeller

Performance

- Maximum speed: 200 km/h (120 mph, 110 kn) at sea level
- Cruise speed: 185 km/h (115 mph, 100 kn)
- Landing speed: 64 km/h (40 mph; 35 kn)
- Service ceiling: 4,115 m (13,501 ft)
- Rate of climb: 2.833 m/s (557.7 ft/min)
- Wing loading: 66.6 kg/m^{2} (13.6 lb/sq ft)
- Power/mass: 9.3 kg/kW (15.3 lb/hp)
