= Danmarks Flymuseum =

Coordinates: 55°59′31″N 8°20′45″E

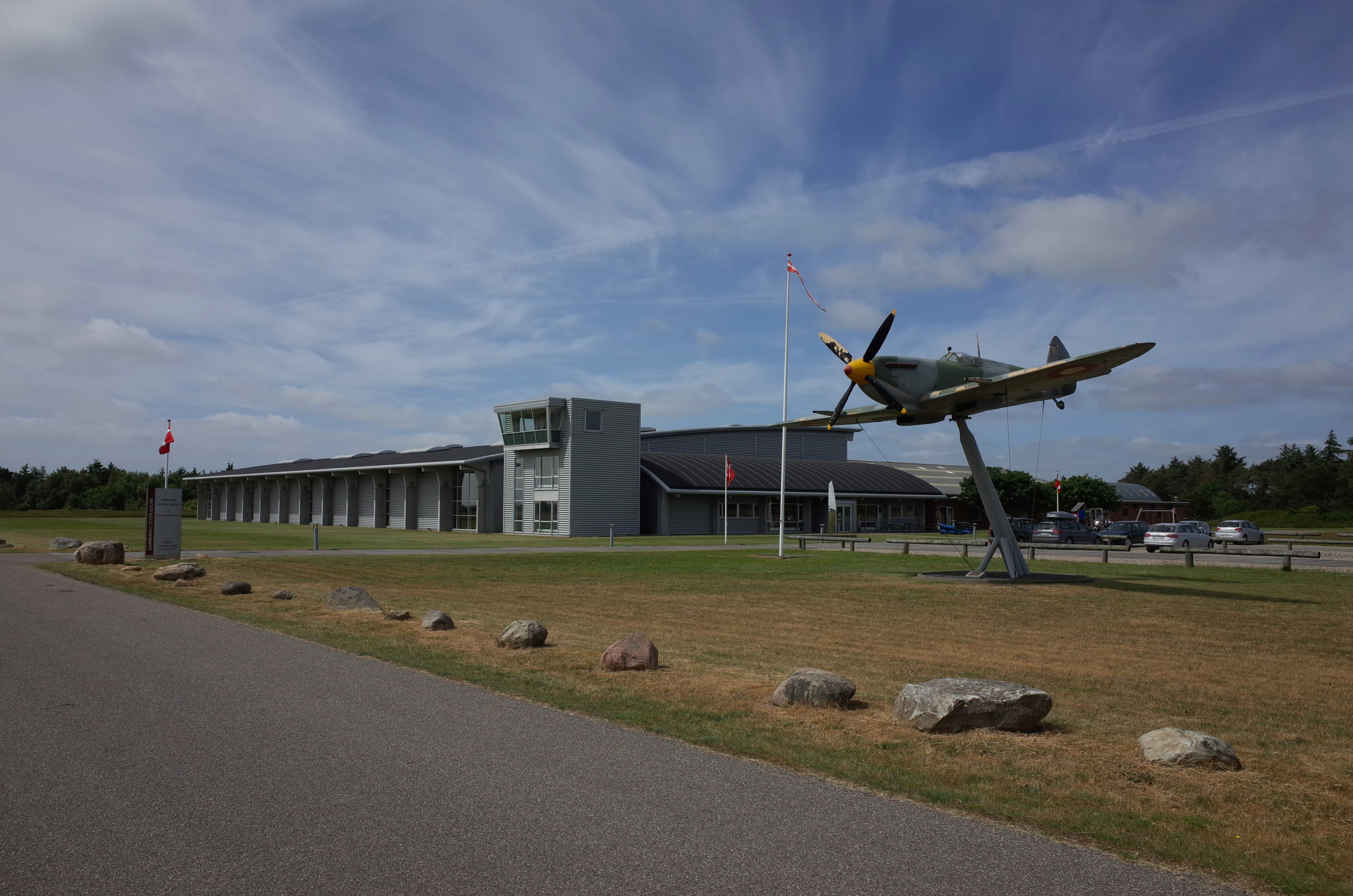
Replica Spitfire plane at Danmarks Flymuseum

The Danmarks Flymuseum is a museum located at Stauning Airport in Stauning, Denmark.

It has a collection of around 70 aircraft from the period 1911 until 2000. Around 60 aircraft are on display. The collection includes gliders, fighter planes and helicopters. Many are still airworthy.

The collection is part of Military museums in Denmark as it hosts the collection of the Royal Danish Air Force.

The museum has a restoration department which restores and maintains aircraft.

Stauning Airport is also home of a yearly vintage aircraft rally.
