= Goodyear Duck =

1940s American light amphibious aircraft

GA-2 Duck
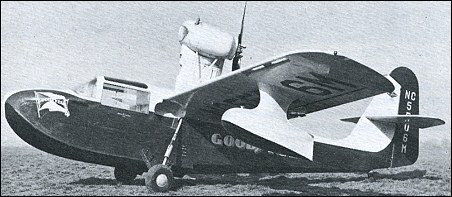
- Goodyear GA-2 Duck

General information
- Type: Three-seat light amphibian
- Manufacturer: Goodyear Aircraft Corporation
- Number built: 19 + 2 GA-22s

History
- First flight: 1944 (GA-1)

The Goodyear GA-2 Duck is a 1940s American three-seat light amphibious aircraft built by the Goodyear Aircraft Corporation. The design team included David Thurston, who later developed several other light seaplanes including the Colonial Skimmer, Lake Buccaneer, Thurston Teal and Seafire. Only 19 aircraft were built, and these were used only for testing and as demonstrators.

== Design and development ==
The Goodyear Aircraft Corporation began to design a small light amphibian before the end of the Second World War. The prototype designated GA-1 first flew in September 1944. It was a cantilever high-wing monoplane with underwing stabilizing floats. The GA-1 had an all-metal fabric-covered wing, an all-metal single-step hull, and a cruciform tail unit. It had a retractable tail-wheel, accommodation for two, and a pylon-mounted piston engine with a pusher propeller.

== Operational history ==
After successful testing of the prototype, 18 demonstration aircraft were built. These differed from the prototype in that they had room for the pilot and two passengers. Two versions were built, the GA-2 with a 145 hp (108 kW) Franklin 6A4-145-A3 piston engine, and the GA-2B with a 165 hp (123 kW) Franklin 6A4-165-B3 flat-six piston engine. Although the aircraft were successfully tested and demonstrated, the costs involved in producing the aircraft prevented it being sold at a price that private pilots could afford, and the project was abandoned. In 1950, a revised four-seat variant the GA-22 Drake was flown, followed in 1953 by the GA-22A Drake; only one of each was built.

== Variants ==
GA-1 Duck
Prototype two-seater originally powered by a 107 hp (80 kW) Franklin 4ACG-100-H3 piston engine, later fitted with a 125 hp (93 kW) Franklin 6A engine, one built.
GA-2 Duck
Demonstration three-seat aircraft with a 145 hp (108 kW) Franklin 6A4-145-A3 engine, 16 built, some later modified as GA-2Bs.
GA-2B Duck
Demonstration three-seat aircraft with a 165 hp (123 kW) Franklin 6A4-165-B3 engine, six modified from GA-2s in 1949.
GA-22 Drake
Revised larger variant with four-seats, two built (one as a GA-22A with a revised hull) with the first flight in 1950.
GA-22A Drake
Revised larger variant with four-seats, powered by a 225 hp (168 kW) Continental E225-8 and converted into a flying boat with a revised hull; first flight in 1953.

== Surviving aircraft ==
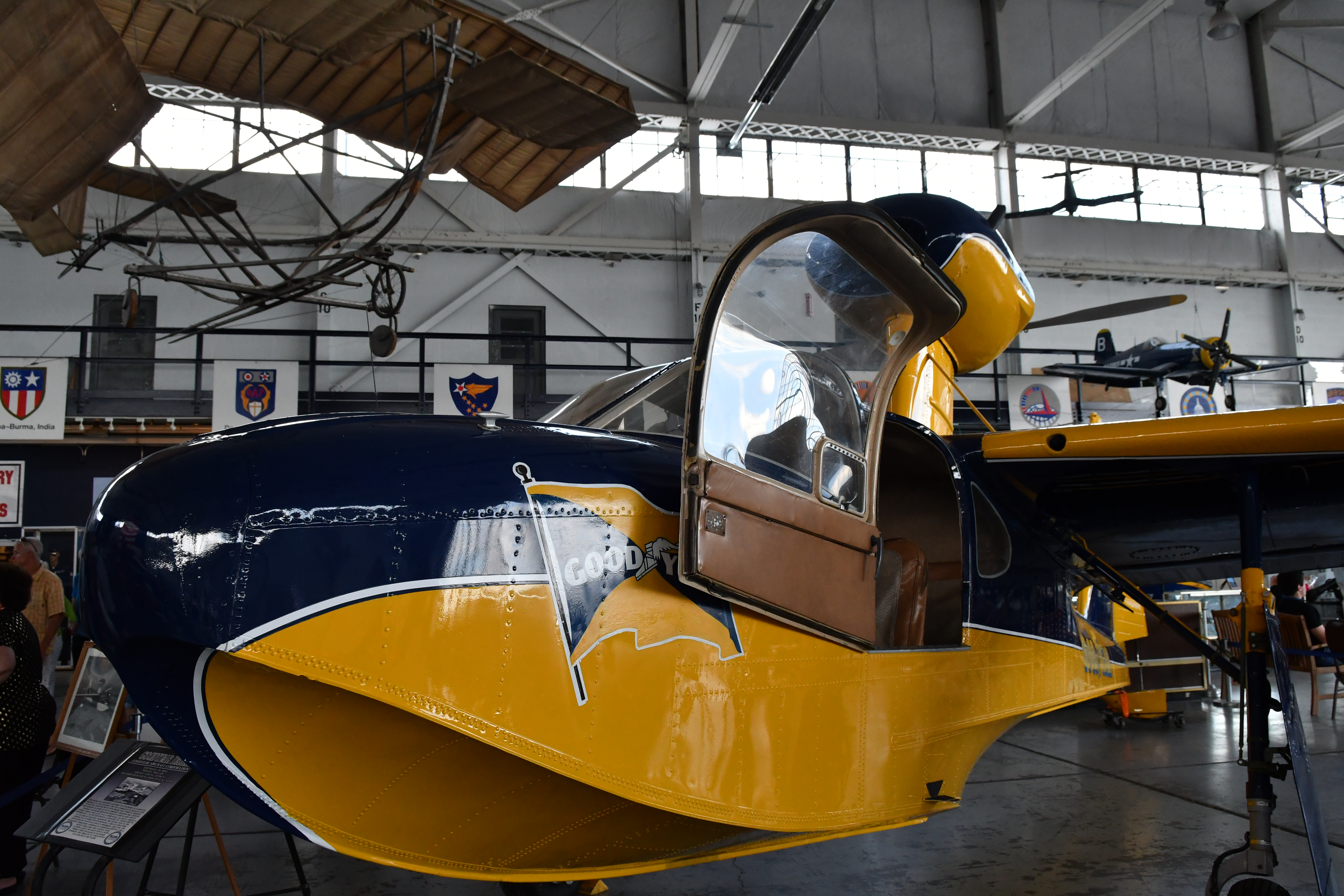
Goodyear GA-22A Drake on display at the MAPS Air Museum in Canton, Ohio.

The last aircraft built, the GA-22A Drake registered N5516M, was stored by the EAA Air Venture Museum until 2010. The airplane was transferred to the Military Aviation Preservation Society in Canton, Ohio where it was fully restored and put on display in 2013.

A collection of four aircraft was discovered in a barn in Kalamazoo, Michigan in 2025 and donated to the MAPS Air Museum.

== Specifications (GA-2) ==
Data from Jane's All the World's Aircraft 1948.

General characteristics

- Crew: 1
- Capacity: 2
- Length: 26 ft 0 in (7.92 m)
- Wingspan: 36 ft 0 in (10.97 m)
- Height: 9 ft 4 in (2.84 m) on wheels
- Airfoil: root: NACA 23015; tip: NACA 23009
- Empty weight: 1,450 lb (658 kg)
- Gross weight: 2,200 lb (998 kg)
- Powerplant: 1 × Franklin 6A4-145-A3 6-cylinder air-cooled horizontally-opposed piston engine, 145 hp (108 kW) pylon-mounted
- Propellers: 2-bladed fixed-pitch pusher propeller

Performance

- Maximum speed: 125 mph (201 km/h, 109 kn)
- Cruise speed: 110 mph (180 km/h, 96 kn)
- Landing speed: 56 mph (49 kn; 90 km/h)
- Range: 300 mi (480 km, 260 nmi)
- Service ceiling: 15,000 ft (4,600 m)
- Rate of climb: 650 ft/min (3.3 m/s)
- Wing loading: 12.3 lb/sq ft (60 kg/m^{2})
- Power/mass: 0.066 hp/lb (0.109 kW/kg)
- Take-off run on land: 700 ft (213 m)
- Take-off run on water: 1,350 ft (411 m)

== See also ==
Aircraft of comparable role, configuration, and era

- Aeromarine Seafire
- Colonial Skimmer
- Lake Buccaneer
- Republic RC-3 Seabee
- SIAI-Marchetti FN.333 Riviera
- Thurston Teal
- Trident TR-1 Trigull
- Volmer VJ-22 Sportsman

Related lists

- List of flying boats and floatplanes
