= Republic RC-3 Seabee =

Civilian amphibious aircraft

RC-3 Seabee
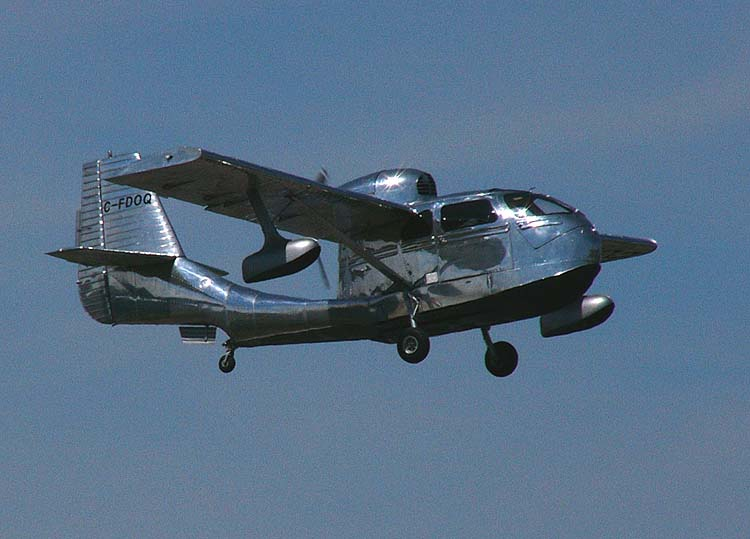

General information
- Type: Amphibious aircraft
- Manufacturer: Republic Aviation Company
- Designer: Percival Spencer
- Number built: 1,060

History
- Manufactured: 1946–1947
- Introduction date: 1946
- First flight: December 1, 1945
- Variant: United Consultants Twin Bee
- Developed into: Trident TR-1 Trigull

The Republic RC-3 Seabee is an all-metal amphibious sports aircraft designed by Percival Spencer and manufactured by the Republic Aircraft Corporation.

== Design and development ==
The RC-3 Seabee was designed by Percival Hopkins "Spence" Spencer. An aviation pioneer who first soloed in a powered airplane in 1914, he designed the Spencer S-12 Air Car Amphibian. Construction of the S-12 began on March 1, 1941 and the small, two-seat S-12 prototype, registered NX29098, made its first flight on August 8, 1941. The S-12 was a fabric-covered amphibian with a unique boxlike forward cabin; a high wing with a two-bladed propeller in pusher configuration; and a long, slender tail boom.

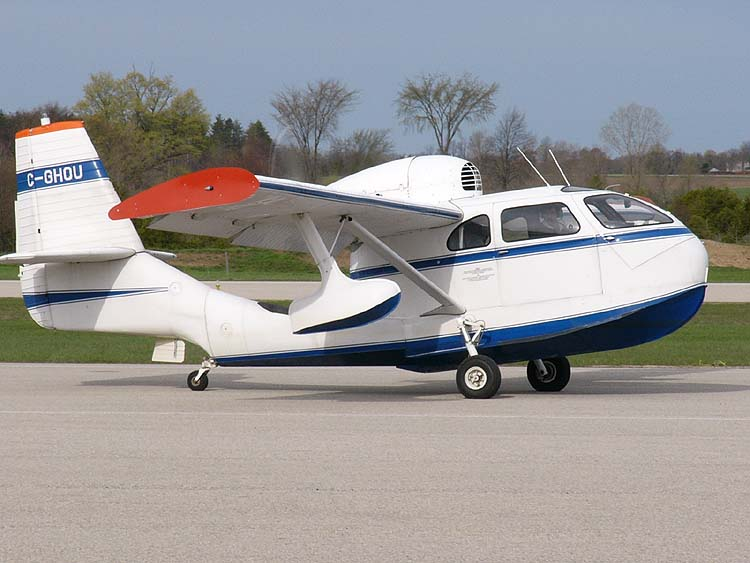
Republic RC-3 Seabee

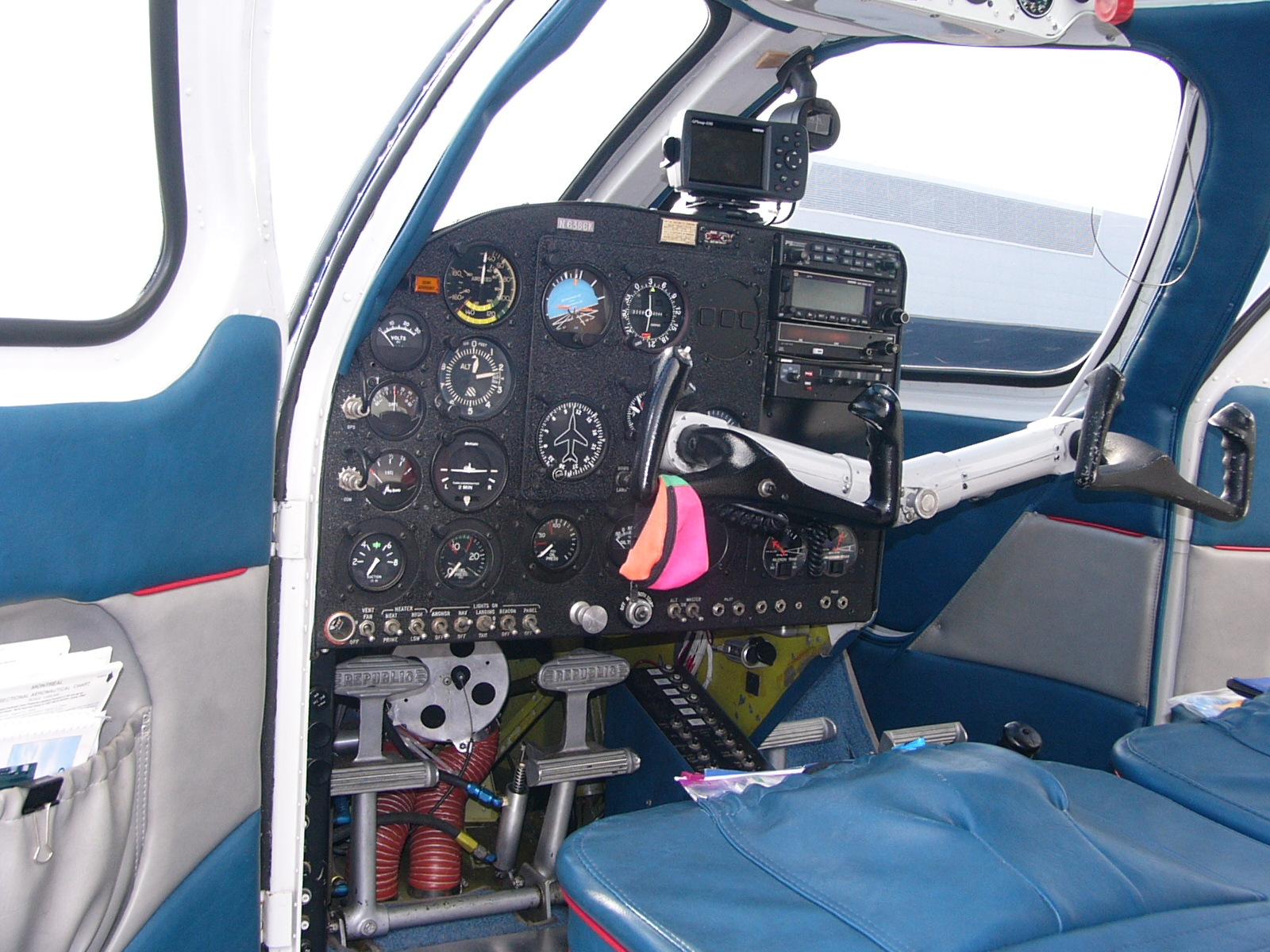
Republic RC-3 Seabee instrument panel and cockpit

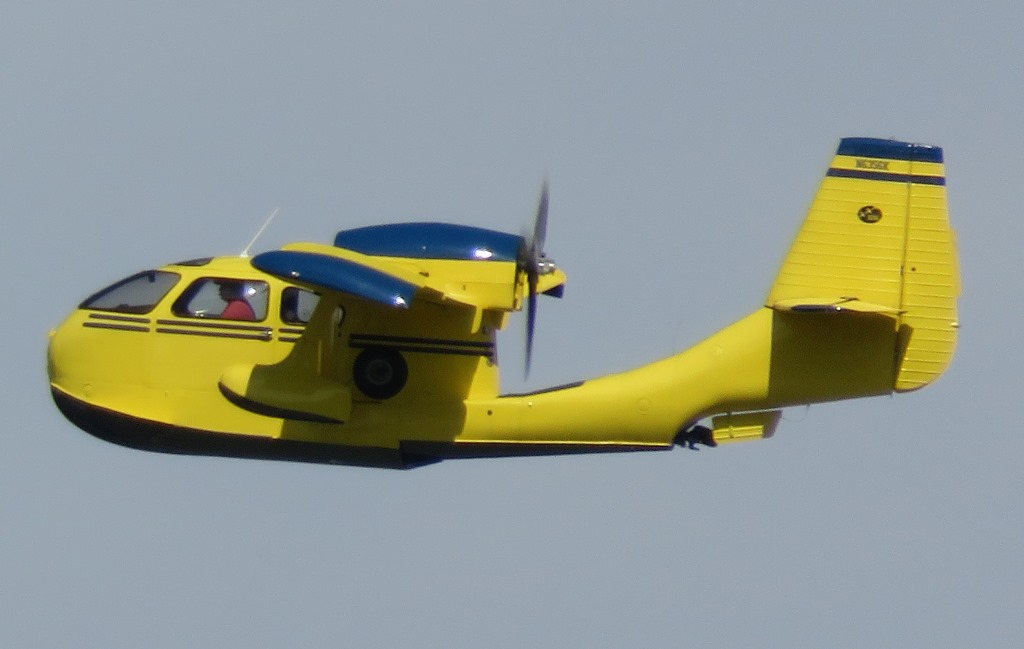
Republic RC-3 Seabee with gear retracted

In December 1941 Spencer put the Air Car into storage and joined the war effort as a test pilot for the Republic Aircraft Corporation. In April 1943 Spencer left Republic Aircraft to join the Mills Novelty Company of Chicago, Illinois who wanted to use his Air Car to promote their company. Spencer used the company's wood forming equipment to build a new egg-shaped cabin for the Air Car and began demonstrating the aircraft to his former employers, Republic Aircraft. Seeing the potential of the Air Car as the perfect sports plane for pilots returning from the war, Republic purchased the rights to the Air Car in December 1943 and immediately began development of an all-metal version designated the Model RC-1 Thunderbolt Amphibian. On November 30, 1944 the first RC-1 Thunderbolt Amphibian, registered NX41816, made its first flight with Spencer at the controls.

The aircraft was displayed in St. Louis, Missouri, in December and by the end of 1944 Republic had received 1,972 civilian orders for the $3,500 airplane. The aircraft was also demonstrated to the U.S. Navy and Army Air Corps. Both services were impressed with the design and on February 19, 1945 the Navy granted Republic Aviation the rights to use the name Seabee for the civilian version. The Army placed a large order for the aircraft, to be used for air-sea rescue operations under the designation OA-15. In September 1945, following VJ Day, both the Army and Navy canceled their orders, which by that time totaled over $20,000,000. The OA-15 Seabee was the last United States Army Air Corps aircraft to use the OA designation, which was dropped when the U.S. Air Force was formed as a separate military branch in 1947.

Military operators included the Israeli Air Force, Paraguayan Navy, the United States Army Air Forces and Republic of Vietnam Air Force.

=== Production ===
In order to meet the anticipated postwar demand for civilian light aircraft, Republic endeavored to build the Seabee as inexpensively as possible, while still retaining reasonable performance and range. A lot of thought went into eliminating what were at the time termed as 'airplane frills,' resulting in a strong product built with as few parts as possible. For example, Seabees as built did not have ribs in the wings; instead, the heavy corrugated aluminum sheet which formed the skin provided the necessary stiffness. Republic was also willing to buy components in volume, which lowered costs further.

On November 22, 1945, the prototype RC-3 (NX87451) came off the assembly line at Republic's factory in Farmingdale, New York and on December 1 made its first flight in Farmingdale with Spencer at the controls.

On December 27, 1945, Republic Aviation purchased Aircooled Motors, manufacturers of the Franklin engine, to supply and build engines for the RC-3 Seabee.

In March, 1946, the first production RC-3 Seabee was completed (NC87457, formerly NX87457, and on July 25, 1946 the first Seabee (NC87463, production #13) was delivered at the Republic factory to J.G. (Tex) Rankin of Rankin Aviation Industries of Tulare, California.

In the late 1940s, aircraft manufacturers hoped that military pilots returning from the war would want to continue flying civilian aircraft for pleasure and sport. This never occurred to the extent the companies imagined, as most wartime pilots returned home never to fly again. As a result, many small and optimistic aircraft companies appeared, then quickly disappeared in the immediate postwar years.

On October 4, 1947, Republic Aviation Corp. announced that it was discontinuing production of the RC-3 Seabee amphibian for the personal plane market. Republic President Mundy I. Peale stated: "Due to the need of all Republic's production facilities for the manufacture of other types of airplanes, the company has decided to discontinue production of the Seabee". Actually, by summer (July/August) 1947 the Seabee sales had almost stalled and since June 1947 the production had been put on hold, awaiting further sales. By the end of production a respectable 1,060 Seabees had been built. Though this was far from the 5,000 Seabees per year Republic had hoped to sell, it still represented a significant number of airplanes compared to other struggling aircraft companies of the same era. Only Piper, with their cheap, long-lived Cub and Super Cub, Beech's popular Bonanza, and Cessna's early 140 and 120 light planes would sell in numbers greater than the Seabee. This was due in no small part to the very low price of the Seabee. During production, however, the price of the Seabee would rise from its original $3,500 to $4,495 effective July 15, 1946 and to $6,000 on November 15, 1946. Republic sold its last new Seabee in 1948. By that time the demand for civilian aircraft had shown itself to be far less than anticipated and the company turned its attention back to military contracts, developing the successful F-84 Thunderjet, which was built on the same assembly lines formerly used to build the Seabee.

== Operational history ==
Seabees became popular in Canada and the United States and were also well-suited for operation in countries with long coastlines, many islands and lakes and large areas of wilderness. By the time production ended, 108 Seabees had been exported to several countries and dealerships were established in Brazil, Cuba, Panama, Colombia, Mexico, Uruguay, Peru, Venezuela, Chile, Argentina, Fiji, New Caledona, South Africa, England, Norway and Sweden.

From the late 1940s and into the 1950s, the Seabee was a popular bush plane and air ambulance in Canada, Norway, Sweden and the United States.

In 2006, over 250 Seabees are still registered and flying, a number that is increasing yearly as new aircraft are assembled from parts and wrecks. A few Seabees are still operating commercially as bush planes and air taxis.

=== Modifications ===
Twenty-three Seabees were converted to a twin-engine variant known as the United Consultants Twin Bee with the fitting of two wing-mounted engines driving tractor propellers. The added thrust greatly enhanced the plane's speed, acceleration and capacity.

Modifications to increase the engine size, wingspan, cargo carrying capacity, controls, trim activation, environmental systems, landing light and many others have been available since the early 1970s.

== Operators ==
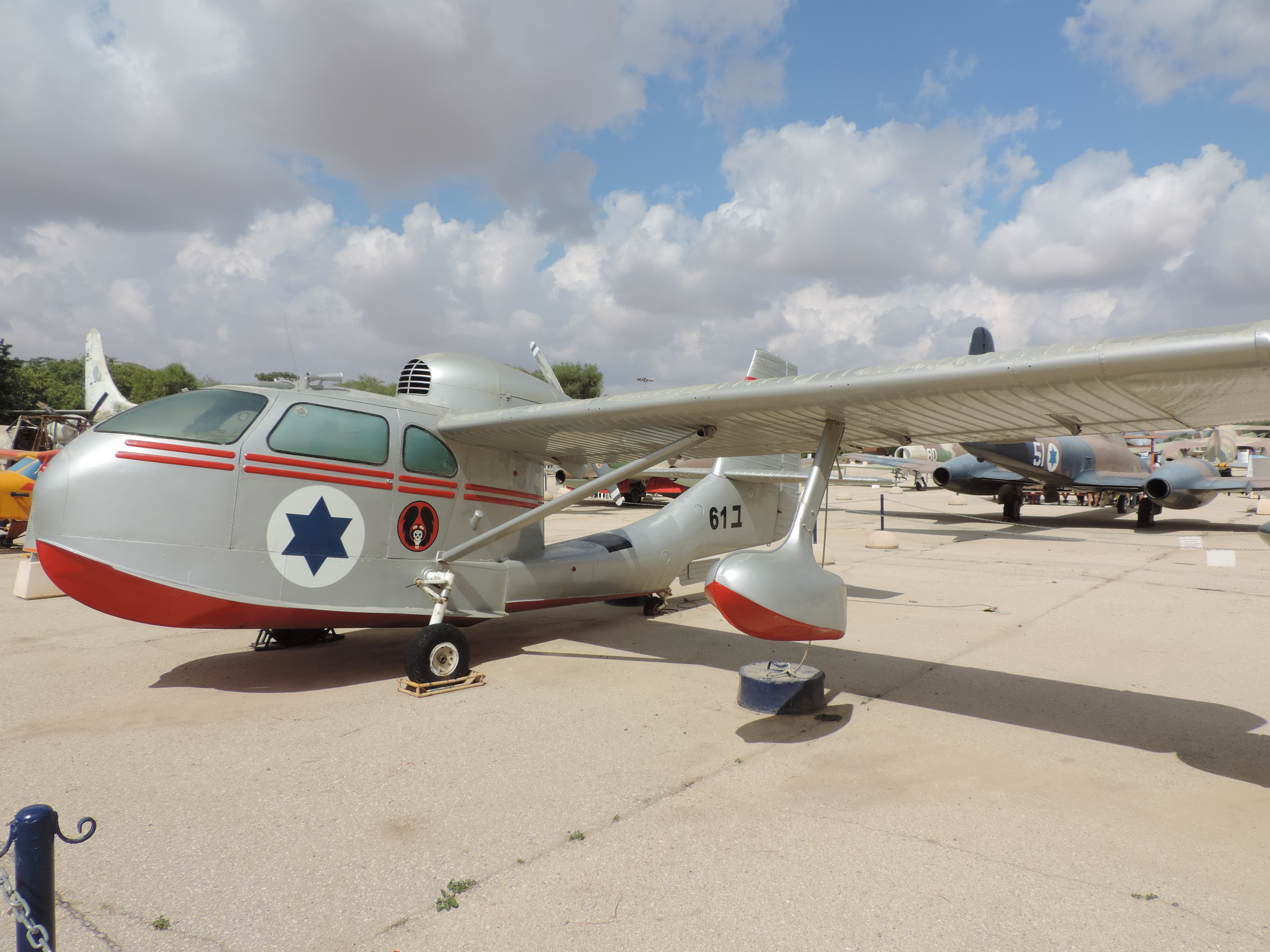
Republic Seabee preserved at the Israeli Air Force Museum in Hatzerim

=== Civil ===
The Seabee is popular with air charter companies and small feeder airlines and is operated by private individuals and companies.

=== Military ===
Israel

- Israeli Air Force
  - 101 Squadron

South Vietnam

- Republic of Vietnam Air Force

== Specifications ==
Data from Jane's all the World's Aircraft 1947

General characteristics

- Crew: 1
- Capacity: 3 passengers
- Length: 27 ft 11 in (8.5 m)
- Wingspan: 37 ft 8 in (11.47 m)
- Height: 9 ft 7 in (2.91 m)
- Wing area: 196 sq ft (18.2 m^{2})
- Aspect ratio: 7.23
- Empty weight: 1,950 lb (885 kg)
- Gross weight: 3,000 lb (1,361 kg)
- Fuel capacity: 75 US gal (62 imp gal; 280 L) fuel; 3 US gal (2.5 imp gal; 11 L) oil
- Powerplant: 1 × Franklin 6AS-215-BSF 6-cyl. horizontally-opposed air-cooled piston engine, 215 hp (160 kW) at 2,500 ft (760 m)
- Propellers: 2-bladed Aeromaster adjustable pitch wooden propeller, 7 ft (2.1 m) diameter (optional Hartzell reversible pitch wooden propeller)

Performance

- Maximum speed: 120 mph (190 km/h, 100 kn)
- Cruise speed: 103 mph (166 km/h, 90 kn) 75% power
- Landing speed: 58 mph (50 kn; 93 km/h)
- Range: 560 mi (900 km, 490 nmi)
- Service ceiling: 12,000 ft (3,700 m)
- Rate of climb: 700 ft/min (3.6 m/s)
- Wing loading: 15.3 lb/sq ft (75 kg/m^{2})
- Power/mass: 14.2 lb/hp (8.623 kg/kW)
- Take-off run (land): 267 yd (244 m)
- Take-off run (water): 333 yd (304 m)
- Take-off time (water): 25 seconds
- Landing run (water): 122 yd (112 m)
- Alighting run (water): 233 yd (213 m)

== See also ==
Related development

- Trident TR-1 Trigull
- United Consultants Twin Bee

Aircraft of comparable role, configuration, and era

- Colonial Skimmer
- Goodyear Duck
- Lake Aircraft Amphibian
- SIAI-Marchetti FN.333 Riviera
- Thurston Teal
