= Sanford Seacoast Regional Airport =

- IATA: SFM; ICAO: KSFM; FAA LID: SFM

Summary
- Airport type: Public
- Owner: City of Sanford
- Location: Sanford, Maine
- Elevation AMSL: 244 ft (74 m)
- Coordinates: 43°23′38″N 070°42′29″W

Map
- Location of airport in Maine SFM (the United States)

Runways
Direction	Length		Surface
Direction	ft	m	Surface
7/25	6,389	1,947	Asphalt
14/32	4,999	1,524	Asphalt

Statistics (2019)
- Aircraft operations: 36,738
- Based aircraft: 131
- Source: Federal Aviation Administration

Sanford Seacoast Regional Airport (IATA: SFM, ICAO: KSFM, FAA LID: SFM) is a public airport located four miles (6 km) southeast of the central business district of Sanford, a city in York County, Maine, United States. The airport operated as Naval Auxiliary Air Facility Sanford (NAAF Sanford, not to be confused with Naval Air Station Sanford, Florida) supporting operations of Naval Air Station Brunswick from 15 April 1943 until 1 February 1946. This airport is now publicly owned by the City of Sanford.

== Facilities and aircraft ==
Sanford Regional Airport covers an area of 1,115 acres (451 ha) which contains two runways:

- Runway 7/25: 6,389 x 150 ft (1,947 x 46 m), surface: asphalt
- Runway 14/32: 4,999 x 100 ft (1,524 x 30 m), surface: asphalt

For the 12-month period ending 31 December 2019, the airport had 36,738 aircraft operations, an average of 101 per day: 95% general aviation, 4% air taxi, and <1% military. There was at that time 131 aircraft based at this airport: 105 single engine, 9 multi-engine, 2 jet, 11 helicopter, 3 glider and 1 ultra-light.

== Fixed-base operator and flight schools ==
There is a fixed-base operator (FBO) and two flight schools on the airfield.

The FBO is Southern Maine Aviation, which has jet fuel, aviation gasoline (100LL) and MoGas. They also operate an aircraft maintenance facility, a flight school and have facilities for transient flight crew and passengers.

There are two flight schools on the field:

- Southern Maine Aviation: provides instruction in single and dual engine airplanes, an American Champion Citabria, a Beechcraft Duchess, several Pipers and Cessna 172-SPs, a complex Cessna 182 and a RedBird Simulator.
- Pine Tree Helicopters: provides instruction in Robinson R22s and R44s. www.pinetreehelicopters.com/

== History ==
- Sanford Naval Air Station Administration Building--Control Tower, Former
- Formerly listed on the U.S. National Register of Historic Places
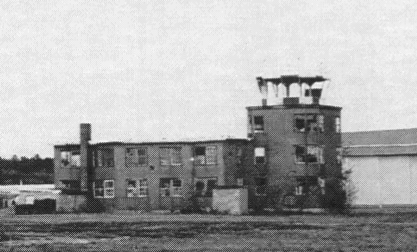
- The NAAS tower, c. 1995
- Area: less than one acre
- Built: 1942
- Built by: United States Navy
- Architectural style: WWII naval control towers
- NRHP reference No.: 97000603

Significant dates
- Added to NRHP: 20 June 1997
- Removed from NRHP: 21 March 2023

The Sanford Airport began as an airfield constructed by the Sanford Mills in the 1930s, with a single airstrip and hangar. With the entry of the United States into World War II in 1941, the airfield was expanded by the United States Navy in 1942 and formally commissioned as Naval Auxiliary Air Facility Sanford in 1943. It served as one of several secondary airfields to the primary Naval Air Station Brunswick. Its runway network was enlarged and paved, and barracks and a control tower were built on what is now the southwestern side of the airfield. A torpedo squadron and a fighter squadron were stationed here in 1944, and the field was used for training exercises. After the war ended, the facilities were largely mothballed, but remained staffed until the 1960s. Of the structures built by the Navy, only a hangar and the control tower/administration building survived. The latter, once listed on the National Register of Historic Places, was demolished in 2006–2007 because it was in poor condition and the tower was deemed a hazard to aviation.

In 1955, Colonial Aircraft began production of the Skimmer amphibian in Sanford, Maine. Later in 1959, the type certificate for the Skimmer was sold to the Lake Aircraft Corporation. Lake continued to produce modified versions of the Skimmer in Sanford as the Lake Buccaneer and Lake Renegade until 1994. Six record-breaking flights departing from Sanford Airport took place in Lake Renegades, piloted by Robert Mann and Peter Foster in 1988 and 1989. The flights set new altitude records for piston amphibians and seaplanes, flying to a maximum altitude of 27,300 feet.

== See also ==
- List of airports in Maine
- National Register of Historic Places listings in York County, Maine
