= SIAI-Marchetti FN.333 Riviera =

FN.333 Riviera
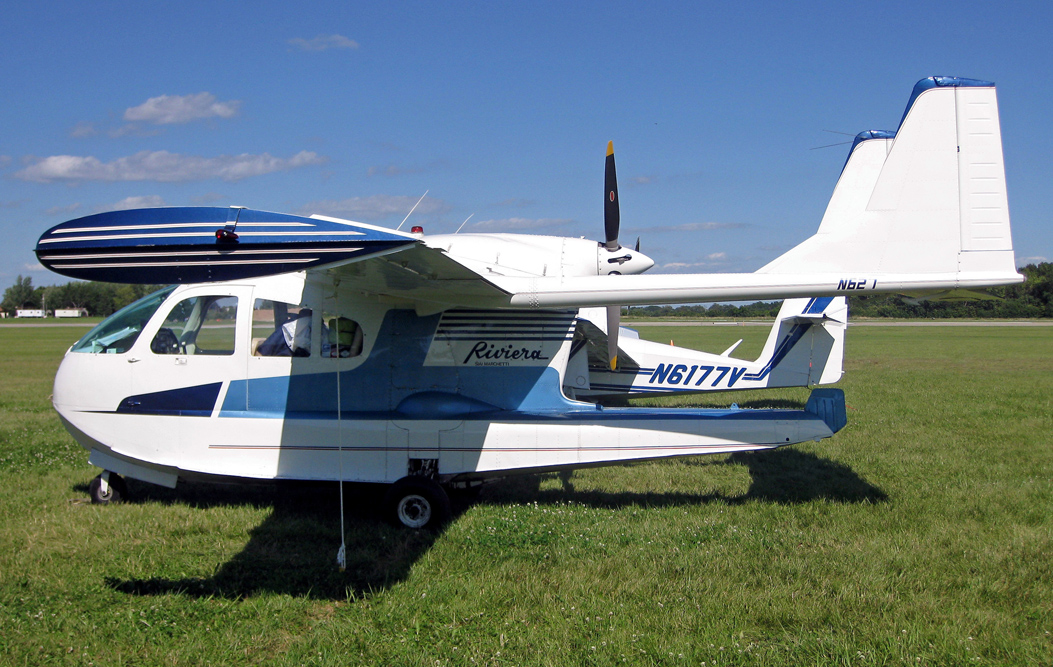
- FN.333 No.002 built by SIAI-Marchetti in 1962, displayed at EAA AirVenture Oshkosh, in 2010.

General information
- Type: Amphibious aircraft
- Manufacturer: Fratelli Nardi, SIAI-Marchetti
- Status: Still in service in 2010
- Primary user: Private pilot owners
- Number built: 29

History
- Introduction date: 1962
- First flight: 4 December 1952

The Nardi FN.333 Riviera, later the SIAI-Marchetti FN.333 Riviera, is an Italian luxury touring amphibious aircraft designed and developed by Fratelli Nardi in the 1950s and produced in small numbers by Savoia-Marchetti during the following decade.

On October 25, 1968, FN-333, Serial # 007 was destroyed in an accident at Akron Municipal Airport. The pilot, Perry A. Strohl Jr. was killed in the incident. The accident was described as follows:

1968-10-25 Hit a pole after losing engine power during take-off (final approach?) from Akron Municipal Airport, Ohio, at 15:22 hrs. Pilot was killed. Aircraft damage reported as "destroyed". The pilot flew the aircraft without maintenance release or preflight. Fuel selector was on empty tank, other tank had fuel. Pilot, commercial, age 46, 576 total hours, 20 in type. NTSB # CHI69A0045, File No: 3–4330.

== Specifications ==
Data from Jane's All the World's Aircraft 1958-59, Seabee.com : Riviera Amphibian

General characteristics

- Crew: 1-2
- Capacity: 2-3
- Length: 7.3 m (23 ft 11 in) overall
- Hull length: 5.550 m (18 ft)
- Wingspan: 10.36 m (34 ft 0 in) over retracted wing-tip floats
- Width: 3.58 m (11 ft 9 in) wings folded
- Height: 3.23 m (10 ft 7 in)
- Wing area: 15.14 m^{2} (163.0 sq ft)
- Aspect ratio: 6.5
- Airfoil: NACA 23000 series
- Empty weight: 890 kg (1,962 lb)
- Gross weight: 1,350 kg (2,976 lb)
- Max takeoff weight: 1,403 kg (3,093 lb)
- Fuel capacity: 300 L (79.3 US gal; 66.0 imp gal) in two wing tanks
- Powerplant: 1 × Continental O-470-H 6-cylinder air-cooled horizontally-opposed piston engine, 180 kW (240 hp)
- Propellers: 2-bladed Hartzell constant-speed feathering pusher propeller

Performance

- Maximum speed: 290 km/h (180 mph, 160 kn) at sea level
- Cruise speed: 265 km/h (165 mph, 143 kn) at 2,450 m (8,000 ft)
- Stall speed: 105 km/h (65 mph, 57 kn) flaps down
- Range: 900 km (560 mi, 490 nmi)
- Ferry range: 1,245 km (774 mi, 672 nmi)
- Service ceiling: 6,100 m (20,000 ft)
- Rate of climb: 6.5 m/s (1,280 ft/min)
- Wing loading: 87.9 kg/m^{2} (18.0 lb/sq ft)
- Power/mass: 0.128 kW/kg (0.078 hp/lb)
- Take-off run: 275 m (900 ft) on land
- Take-off run: 420 m (1,380 ft) on water
- Landing run: 200 m (660 ft) on land

== See also ==
Aircraft of comparable role, configuration, and era

- Colonial Skimmer
- Goodyear Duck
- Lake Aircraft Amphibian
- Republic RC-3 Seabee
- Thurston Teal

Related lists

- List of flying boats and floatplanes
