= Grumman G-65 Tadpole =

G-65 Tadpole
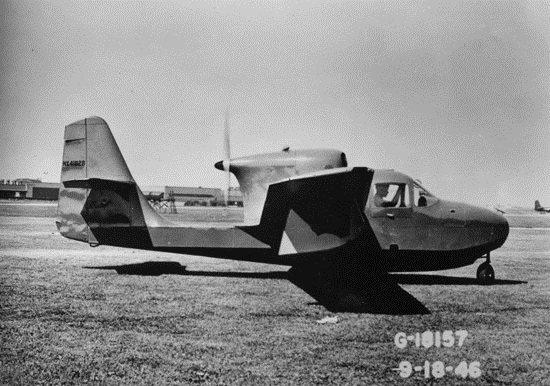

General information
- Type: Recreational amphibian
- Manufacturer: Grumman
- Number built: 1

History
- First flight: 7 December 1944
- Variant: Colonial Skimmer

The Grumman G-65 Tadpole was an American prototype light amphibian designed and built by Grumman. Only one was built and it did not enter production. It was later developed into a family of amphibious aircraft by David Thurston.

== Design and development ==
Part of a project by Grumman to find types to produce once World War II had ended, the G-65 Tadpole was designed by a team under the direction of Hank Kurt. The Tadpole was a two or three-seat shoulder-wing cantilever monoplane with retractable tricycle landing gear. It was powered by a 125 hp (93 kW) Continental C125 engine above the rear fuselage driving a pusher propeller. Kurt first flew the Tadpole on 7 December 1944. The G-65 Tadpole postwar was not put into production for numerous reasons, those to include; the over anticipation of a private aviation market, less costly military surplus aircraft, and the inability to compete in the amphibious aircraft market. Although not developed by Grumman, one of the design team, David Thurston, later developed the design into a family of amphibians including the Colonial Skimmer and Lake Buccaneer.

== Specifications ==
Data from Grumman Aircraft since 1929

General characteristics

- Crew: 1
- Capacity: 2 passengers
- Length: 23 ft 6 in (7.16 m)
- Wingspan: 35 ft 0 in (10.67 m)
- Height: 8 ft 3 in (2.51 m)
- Wing area: 155 sq ft (14.4 m^{2})
- Empty weight: 1,450 lb (658 kg)
- Gross weight: 2,100 lb (953 kg)
- Powerplant: 1 × Continental C125-3 air-cooled six-cylinder horizontally-opposed engine, 125 hp (93 kW)

Performance

- Maximum speed: 125 mph (201 km/h, 109 kn)
- Cruise speed: 103 mph (166 km/h, 90 kn)

== See also ==
Related development

- Colonial Skimmer
- Lake Buccaneer

Related lists

- List of flying boats
