= Trident TR-1 Trigull =

Canadian amphibious light aircraft

TR-1 Trigull
- The first prototype Trigull, C-FTRI

General information
- Type: Amphibious aircraft
- National origin: Canada
- Manufacturer: Trident Aircraft
- Status: Prototypes only flown
- Number built: 3

History
- First flight: 5 August 1973
- Developed from: Republic RC-3 Seabee

The Trident TR-1 Trigull is a Canadian amphibious aircraft that was developed by Trident Aircraft of Burnaby, British Columbia and later Sidney, British Columbia. The aircraft was intended to be supplied as a complete ready-to-fly certified aircraft. The company encountered financial difficulties and only three prototypes were ever built.

== Design and development ==
The Trigull was designed as an improved and updated Republic RC-3 Seabee. It features a cantilever high-wing, a four to six seat enclosed cabin, retractable tricycle landing gear and a single engine in pusher configuration.

The aircraft is made from aluminum sheet with the forward cabin made from fibreglass. Its 41.8 ft (12.7 m) span wing employs a NACA 23015 R-4 airfoil, has an area of 245.2 sq ft (22.78 m^{2}) and flaps. Standard engines available were initially intended to be the Continental Tiara 6-285 285 hp (213 kW) and Tiara 6-320 320 hp (239 kW) four-stroke powerplants. Later the 300 hp (224 kW) Lycoming IO-540-M1A5D and turbocharged 340 hp (254 kW) Lycoming TIO-540-J2BD were used.

The design incorporates some innovative features, including wing tip floats that retract into the wing tips and provide additional wing area and lift, a nose wheel that retracts into the nose to act as a bumper for mooring on water, and drooping ailerons.

The Trigull was specifically designed to compete with the Republic RC-3 Seabee, Lake Buccaneer and the SIAI-Marchetti FN.333 Riviera.

Trident Aircraft was founded in February 1970 to develop the TR-1. The aircraft first flight was on 5 August 1973, with the second prototype first flying on 2 July 1976. The TR-1 Trigull 285 model's Canadian Transport Canada aircraft certification was completed on 28 October 1976 with US Federal Aviation Administration certification following on 16 December 1976. Series production was to commence in the early 1980s, and orders were received for 43 aircraft, plus 23 options. The project received technical assistance from both Canadair and Grumman Aerospace Corporation. Despite financial assistance from the federal government's Ministry of Industry, Trade and Commerce and the provincial government's British Columbia Development Corporation, the company ran out of capital and ceased operations in 1980.

Although intended for series production, only three prototypes were ever built by Trident. Two were registered and flown, CF-TRI (later C-FTRI) and C-GATE, while the third was an engineering test airframe.

The type certificate has been held by Viking Air of Sidney, British Columbia since 2006. Viking Air also owns the two remaining prototype aircraft. In 2003 Viking Air indicated an interest in producing the Trigull as a turbine-powered amphibian, with a price at that time estimated at US$400,000, but since then no further news has been released. On 1 August 2024, the type certificate was transferred from Viking Air to De Havilland Canada.

== Variants ==
TR-1 Trigull 285
Model with the Continental Tiara 6-285 285 hp (213 kW) engine and four seats. Type certified in Canada on 28 October 1976 and in the United States on 16 December 1976.
TR-1 Trigull 320
Model with the Continental Tiara 6-320 320 hp (239 kW) engine and six seats.

== Specifications (Trigull 285) ==
Data from Plane and Pilot.

General characteristics

- Crew: one
- Capacity: three passengers
- Length: 29 ft 4 in (8.94 m)
- Wingspan: 41 ft 9 in (12.73 m) with tip floats up
- Height: 12 ft 6 in (3.81 m) on land
- Wing area: 245.2 sq ft (22.78 m^{2}) with tip floats up
- Aspect ratio: 7.11:1 with tip floats up
- Airfoil: NACA 23015R-4 (modified)
- Empty weight: 2,400 lb (1,089 kg)
- Gross weight: 3,800 lb (1,724 kg)
- Fuel capacity: 103 U.S. gallons (390 L; 86 imp gal)
- Powerplant: 1 × Continental Tiara 6-285 six cylinder, air-cooled, four stroke aircraft engine, 285 hp (213 kW)
- Propellers: 3-bladed Hartzell Propeller, 7 ft (2.1 m) diameter reversible pitch

Performance

- Maximum speed: 157 mph (253 km/h, 136 kn)
- Cruise speed: 148 mph (238 km/h, 129 kn)
- Stall speed: 52 mph (84 km/h, 45 kn)
- Never exceed speed: 211 mph (340 km/h, 183 kn)
- Range: 520 mi (840 km, 450 nmi)
- Service ceiling: 16,000 ft (4,900 m)
- Rate of climb: 1,000 ft/min (5.1 m/s)
- Wing loading: 15.5 lb/sq ft (76 kg/m^{2})

== See also ==
Related development

- Republic RC-3 Seabee
- United Consultants Twin Bee
