= Percival Spencer =

Percival Spencer may refer to:

- Percival G. Spencer (1864-1913), British balloonist
- Percival H. Spencer (1897–1995), American inventor (Spencer repeating rifle), aviation pioneer and businessman
- Percival Spencer (sprinter) (born 1975), Jamaican sprinter

== See also ==
- Percy Spencer (1894–1970), American engineer and inventor
