= Chatelain AC.9 =

1960s French aircraft

AC.9

General information
- Type: recreational aircraft
- Manufacturer: homebuilt
- Designer: Armand Chatelain
- Primary user: Private pilot owners

History
- First flight: 1966

The Chatelain AC.9 is a 1960s French two-seat homebuilt aircraft designed by Armand Chatelain.

== Specifications ==
Data from

General characteristics

- Crew: 3
- Length: 6.55 m (21 ft 6 in)
- Wingspan: 9.00 m (29 ft 6 in)
- Empty weight: 420 kg (926 lb)
- Gross weight: 850 kg (1,874 lb)
- Powerplant: 1 × Continental O-280 4-cylinder air-cooled horizontally-opposed piston engine, 110 kW (150 hp)
- Propellers: 2-bladed SIPA propeller

Performance
