= United Consultants Twin Bee =

American twin-engined light amphibious aircraft

UC-1 Twin Bee
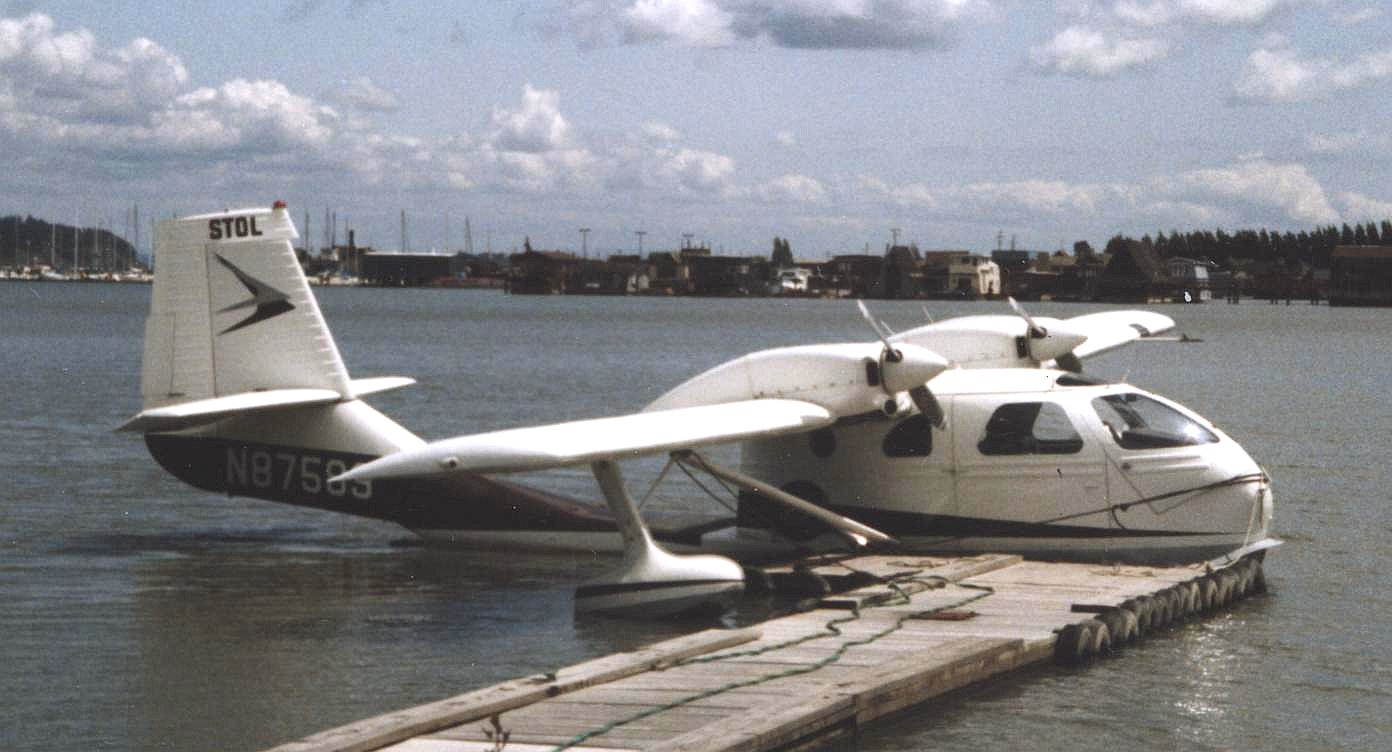
- UC-1 Twin Bee

General information
- Type: Twin-engined amphibian
- National origin: United States
- Manufacturer: United Consultants Corporation
- Designer: Joseph W Gigante
- Status: several in service in 2009
- Number built: 23

History
- Introduction date: 1965
- First flight: 1962
- Developed from: Republic Seabee

The United Consultants Twin Bee is an American twin-engine light amphibious aircraft of the 1960s.

== Development ==
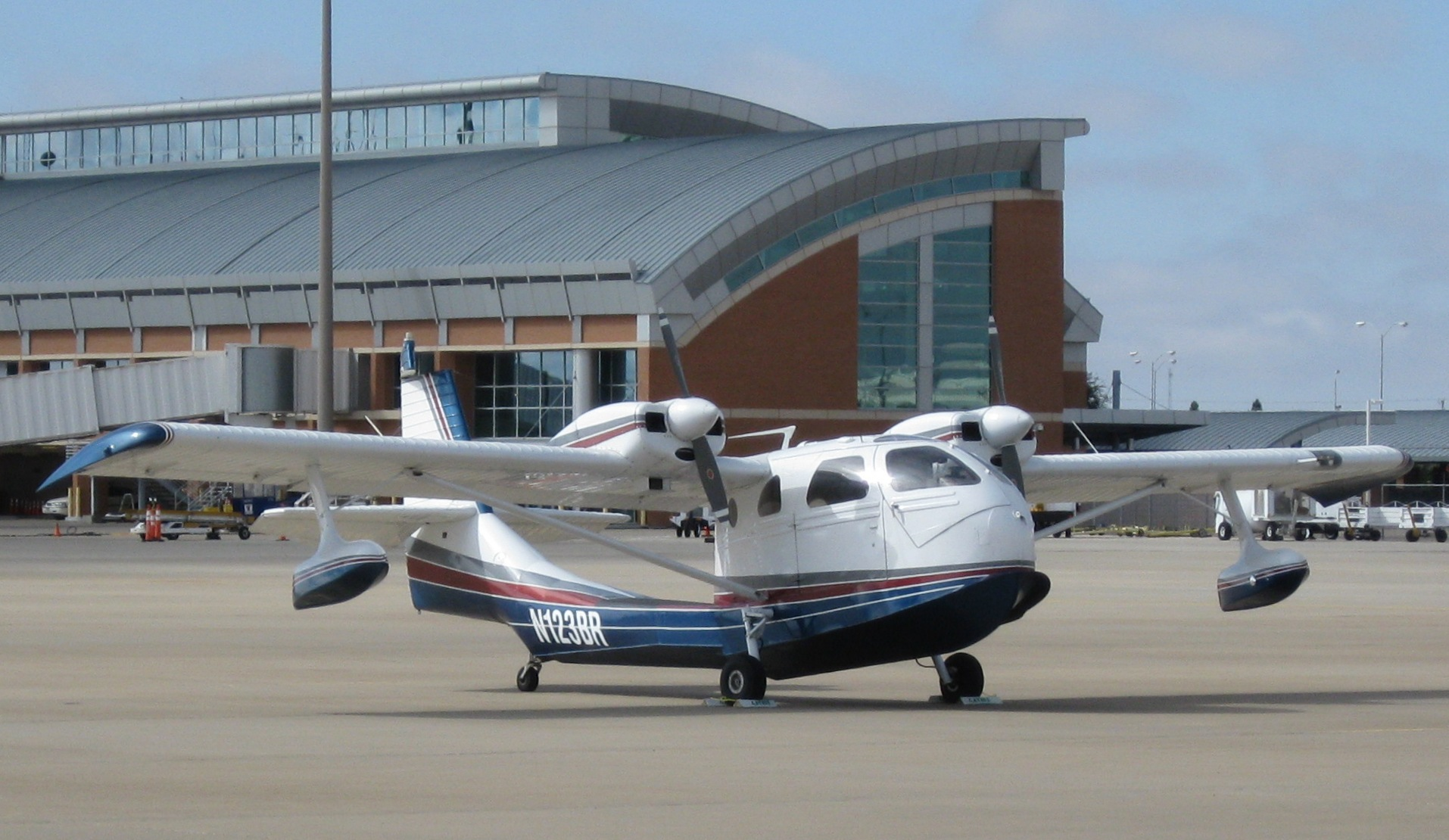
United Consultants Twin Bee

The Republic RC-3 Seabee, upon which the Twin Bee is based, was built between 1946 and 1948, with over 1000 aircraft being sold. The type was rather underpowered and many were later fitted with more powerful engines than the 215 hp (160 kW) Franklin 6A8 originally fitted.

In 1960, former Helio company engineer Joseph W. Gigante (1916-2012) designed a twin-engine conversion of the Seabee and founded United Consultants Corporation in Norwood, Massachusetts, to undertake the manufacturing work on the UC-1 Twin Bee.

The first aircraft flew in 1962 and the type certificate was awarded on 25 June 1965. 23 production examples were delivered between 1965 and 1987.

The UC-1 is a major conversion of the RC-3 Seabee airframe. The single pusher engine is deleted and this allows an additional fifth seat to be fitted beneath the old installation. The twin 180 hp (134 kW) Lycoming engines, mounted in tractor configuration, are fitted in the wing, fairly close to the cabin. This required the rear cabin windows to be reduced in size, supplemented by a porthole-type window each side of the rear of the enlarged cabin.

The rights to the UC-1 design were transferred to STOL Aircraft Corporation. J.W. Gigante advertised the rights for sale during September 2006.

== Operational history ==
The considerable extra engine power of Twin Bee proved to be attractive to private owners, as the aircraft has STOL takeoff and landing ability. 15 of the 23 conversions were currently registered in the United States in April 2009. Other examples are active in Switzerland and the Philippines.

== Specifications ==
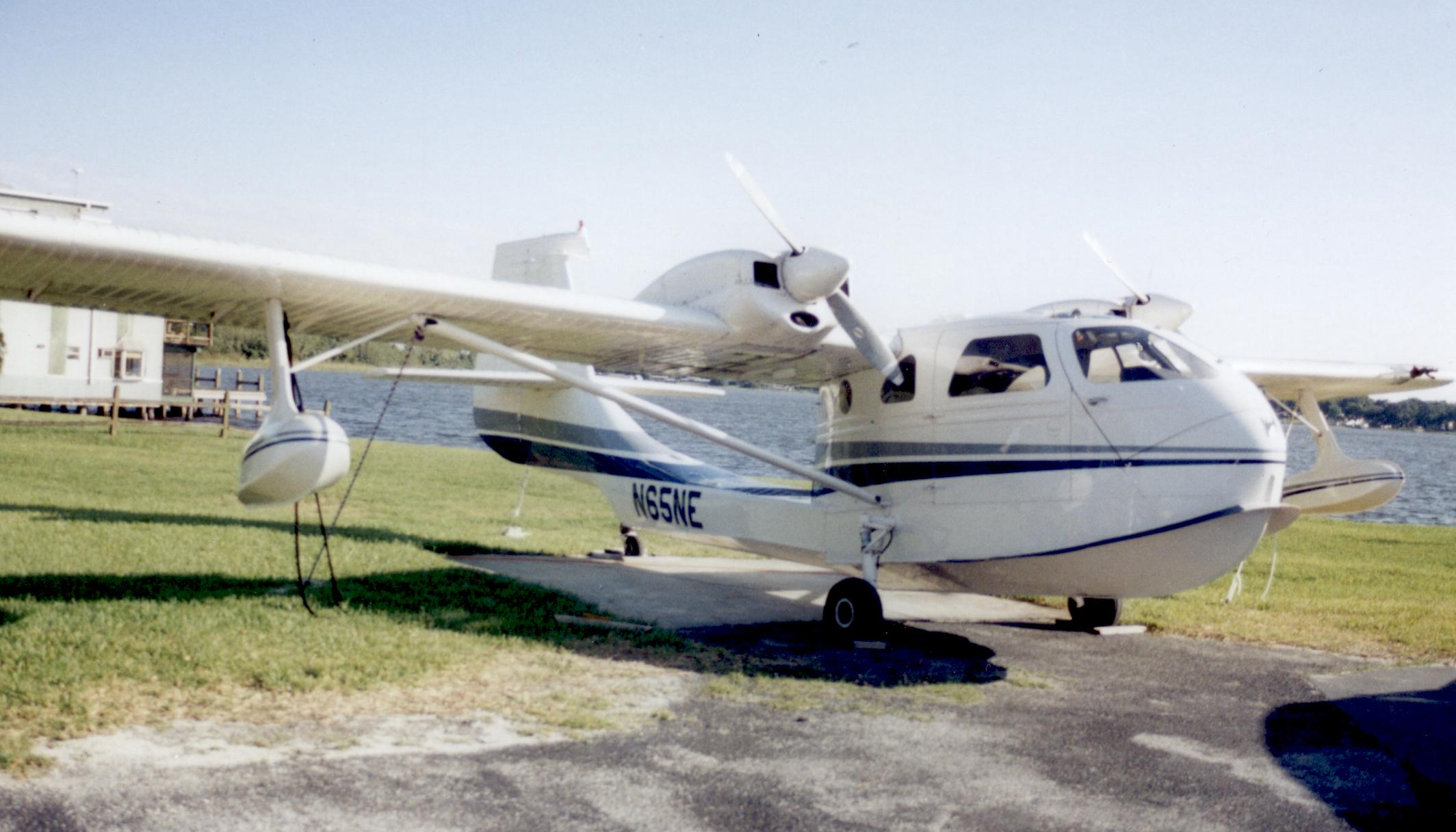
UC-1 Twin Bee

Data from Aerofiles

General characteristics

- Crew: one
- Capacity: four passengers
- Length: 31 ft 4 in (9.55 m)
- Wingspan: 43 ft 3 in (13.18 m)
- Powerplant: 2 × Lycoming IO-360-B1D , 180 hp (134 kW) each

Performance

- Maximum speed: 147 mph (238 km/h, 128 kn)
- Cruise speed: 131 mph (210 km/h, 114 kn)
- Stall speed: 38 mph (61 km/h, 33 kn)
- Range: 900 mi (1,448 km, 780 nmi)
- Service ceiling: 19,000 ft (5,791 m)

== See also ==
Related development

- Republic RC-3 Seabee
- Trident TR-1 Trigull
