= Spencer Air Car =

American flying boat

S-12-D Air Car
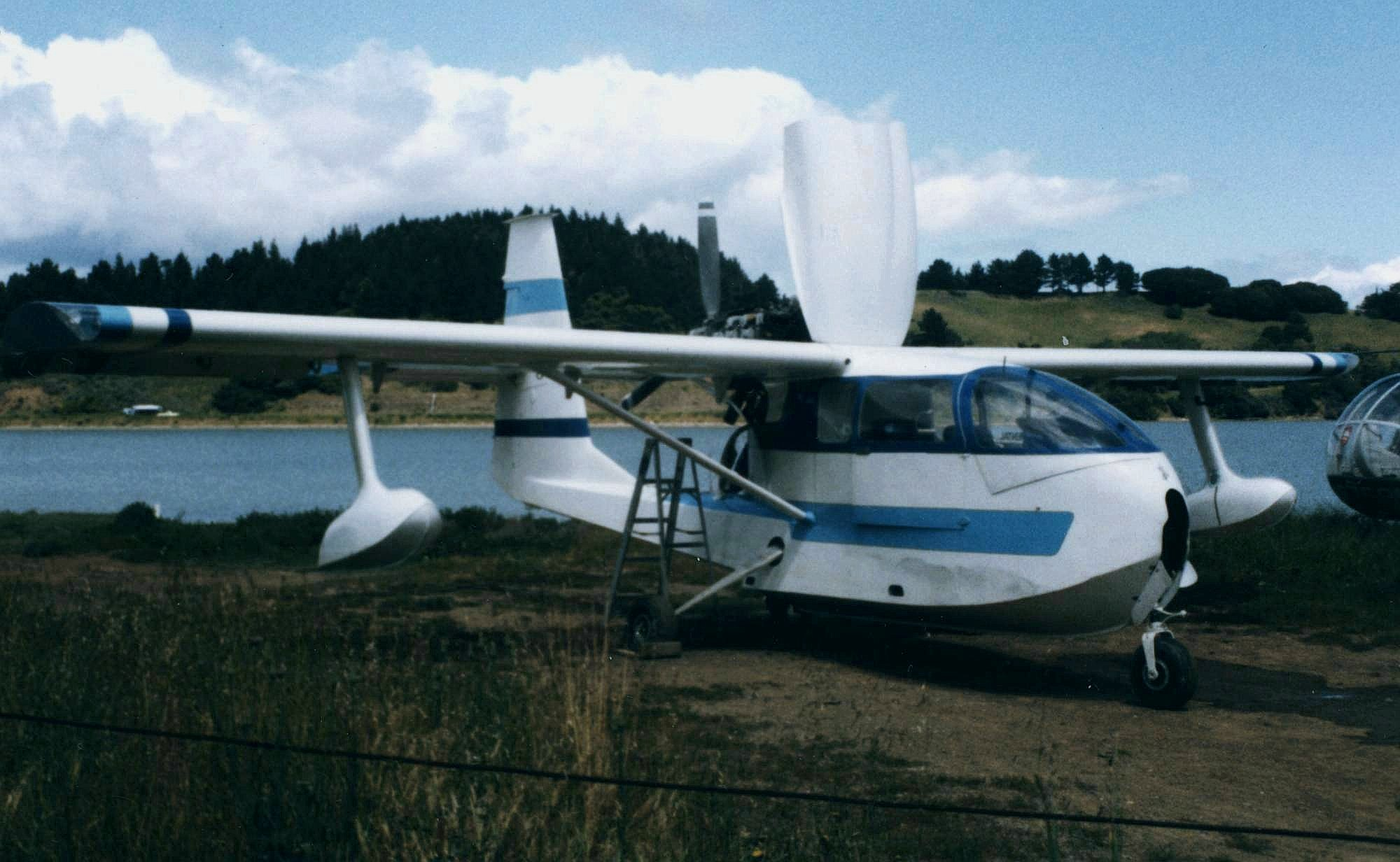
- Spencer Air Car at Mill Valley Seaplane base near San Francisco in April 1989 with engine cowling open

General information
- Type: single-engine amphibian
- National origin: United States
- Manufacturer: Spencer-Larsen Aircraft Corporation, Spencer (homebuilt)
- Designer: Percival H. "Spence" Spencer
- Status: in operation
- Primary user: private owner pilots
- Number built: 1 prototype, over 50 homebuilt completions

History
- Introduction date: 1941, 1968 (homebuilt)
- First flight: 8 August 1941, May 1970 (homebuilt)
- Developed from: SL-12C amphibian
- Developed into: Republic Seabee

The Spencer Amphibian Air Car is an American light amphibious aircraft. The name was first used in 1940 for a prototype air vehicle that developed into the Republic Seabee. The name was later used by its designer Percival Spencer for a series of homebuilt amphibious aircraft roughly based on the Seabee design.

== Design and development ==
Percival H. Spencer formed the Spencer-Larsen Aircraft Corporation and designed the SL-12C amphibian. Disenchanted with corporate policies in the development of the SL-12C amphibian, Spencer started the Spencer Amphibian Air Car in 1940. The original Spencer Amphibian Air Car was test flown in 1941. The aircraft was put into storage due to wartime restrictions in effect in the US during World War II. The aircraft and rights to its design were sold to Republic as the "Seabee" in 1943. After leaving Republic, he designed the on-off two-seat Air Car. In 1968, Spencer and retired USAF Col. Dale L. "Andy" Anderson formed a new company to market a four-place amphibious homebuilt design once again called the Spencer Amphibian Air Car, with S-12C, S-12D, S-12E, and S-14 variants. The first example was test flown in 1970 in Chino, California. The unit had a build cost of $8700.00

The S-12-D Aircar is an improved and larger four-seat aircraft, which retains the basic layout of the Seabee. The two seat S-14 used advanced composites and was test flown by Spencer in 1983 at the age of 86. Its design did not meet expectations and the sole example was donated to the EAA AirVenture Museum in Oshkosh, Wisconsin.

The Air Car is built from wood, steel and glass-fibre. It has a strut-braced high wing and the cabin and fuel-carrying floats are similar to the Seabee, but the tail unit is more angular and a retractable tricycle undercarriage is fitted.

In addition to examples constructed by Spencer, plans of the design have been sold for home construction and the first amateur-built Air Car flew in September 1974. Over 50 had flown by 2001. Examples are currently (2009) flying in the US and Canada.

== Variants ==
Spencer Amphibian Air Car
initial two-seat version
S-12-C
early production with 110 hp (82 kW) Lycoming
S-12-D
main production version with 180 hp (134 kW) Lycoming O-360 or 260 hp (194 kW) Lycoming O-540

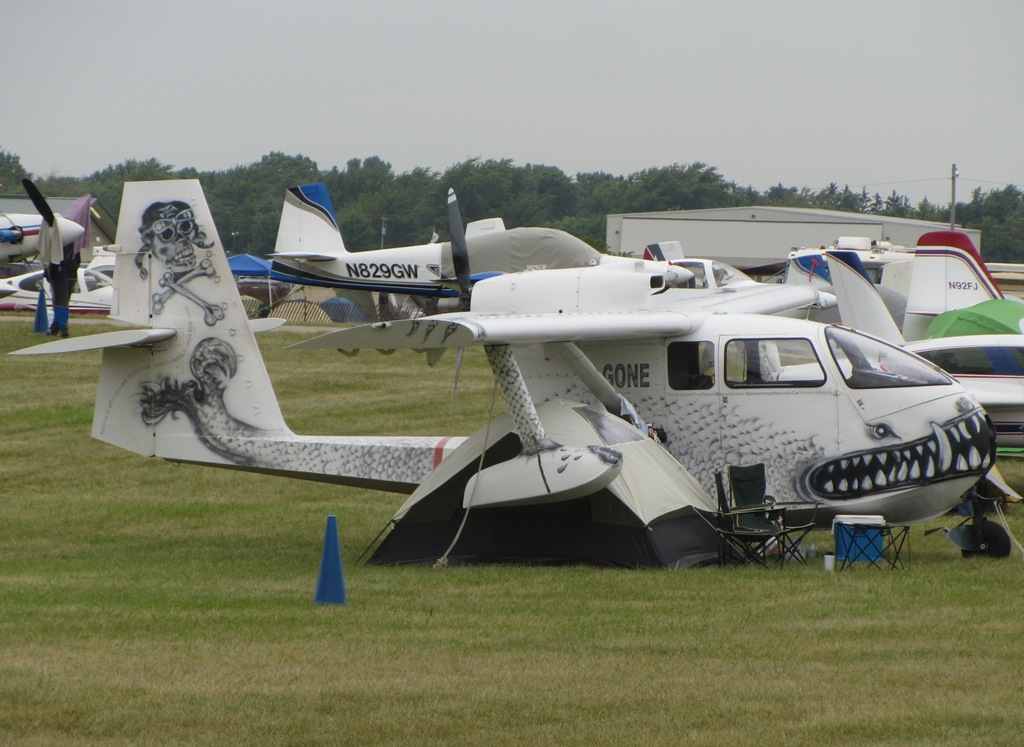
Spencer Air Car S-12-E

S-12-E
prototype re-engined with 285 hp (213 kW) Continental Tiara 6-285
S-14 Air Car Junior
two-seater, twin booms, Lycoming O-320, one example
Spencer-Larsen SL-12C
Later prototype built in association with the (Victor A) Larsen Aircraft Co, incorporating many design changes, but flight test were unsuccessful and the sole prototype was dismantled after 10 hours flying.

== Specifications S-12-E ==
Data from Jane's All the World's Aircraft 1975-76, Airlife's World Aircraft

General characteristics

- Crew: 1
- Capacity: 3 passengers / 1,050 lb (476 kg) payload
- Length: 26 ft 5 in (8.05 m)
- Wingspan: 37 ft 4 in (11.38 m)
- Height: 12 ft 0 in (3.66 m) including propeller
- Wing area: 184 sq ft (17.1 m^{2})
- Airfoil: NACA 4415
- Empty weight: 2,190 lb (993 kg)
- Max takeoff weight: 3,200 lb (1,451 kg)
- Fuel capacity: 94 US gal (78 imp gal; 356 L) fuel in fuselage tank and stabilising floats; 2.25 US gal (2 imp gal; 9 L) oil
- Powerplant: 1 × Continental Tiara 6-285-B 6-cylinder air-cooled horizontally-opposed piston engine
- Propellers: 3-bladed Hartzell, 7 ft 0 in (2.13 m) diameter metal constant-speed reversible pusher propeller

Performance

- Maximum speed: 128 kn (147 mph, 237 km/h) at sea level at MTOW
- Cruise speed: 122 kn (140 mph, 226 km/h) at 5,500 ft (1,676 m) at MTOW

117 kn (135 mph; 217 km/h) at 7,600 ft (2,316 m) 65% power at MTOW

- Stall speed: 46 kn (53 mph, 85 km/h) flaps up

37.5 kn (43 mph; 69 km/h) with 35° flap

- Range: 695 nmi (800 mi, 1,287 km) 65% power at 7,800 ft (2,377 m) with 30 minutes reserve
- Rate of climb: 1,000 ft/min (5.1 m/s) at sea level
- Wing loading: 17.4 lb/sq ft (85 kg/m^{2})
- Power/mass: 0.0877 hp/lb (0.1442 kW/kg)
- Take-off time: 16 seconds from calm water at sea level
