= Continental Tiara series =

Family of aircraft engines

Tiara series
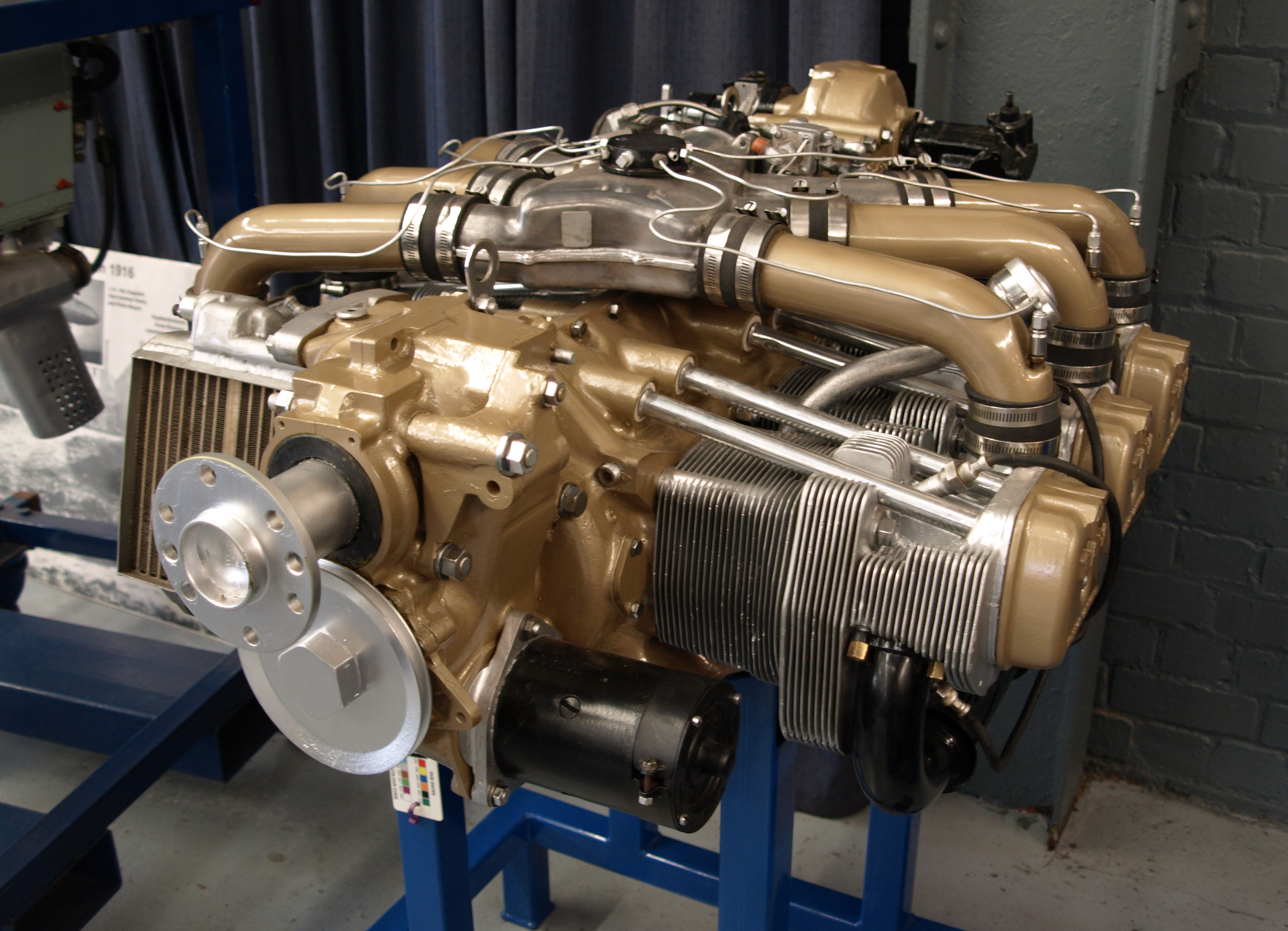
- Tiara 0-405 on display at the Rolls-Royce Heritage Trust Derby
- Type: Piston aircraft engine
- Manufacturer: Teledyne Continental Motors
- First run: 1960s
- Major applications: Piper PA-36 Pawnee Brave; Robin HR100; Transavia PL-12 Airtruk
- Manufactured: 1969–1975

The Continental Tiara series are a family of air-cooled, horizontally opposed aircraft engines. Designed and built by Continental Motors/TCM, the Tiara series were commercially unsuccessful, costing the company millions of dollars.

== Design and development ==
Continental began development of the Tiara series in 1965. At the time, CAE, Continental Motor's turbine engine subsidiary, had developed the T65, a small turboshaft engine which was being considered by Bell for its new Model 206 helicopter. Faced with having to fund the production tooling for the T65 in order to keep the price reasonable, or funding the Tiara series, Continental's corporate management chose to invest in the Tiaras.

While the Tiara series were basically traditional boxer engines, they did have some unique features. The engines had high rotational speeds, 0.5:1 gearing was used to reduce propeller speed, with the camshaft forming an extension of the propeller shaft. The propeller shaft featured the Hydra-Torque drive to reduce the shaft's vibrations. The engines were available with four, six- and eight-cylinders. All were fuel-injected, with turbocharging being optional.

The engines' fuel consumption was high, which became a disadvantage during the 1973 oil crisis era. In addition, the Tiaras' performance was not significantly improved over existing engines, making it difficult for aircraft manufacturers to justify the costs of certificating their products for the engines. These problems led Continental to finally discontinue the engines in 1980.

== Series ==
Reference: Continental, Teledyne Continental Motors, TCM (US); Rolls-Royce (UK) Part 1: Introduction and O-110 through OL-300

=== Four-cylinder ===
Tiara 4-180 (O-270)
180 hp, 271 cu in capacity

=== Six-cylinder ===
Tiara 6-260 (O-405)
260 hp, 406 cu in capacity
Tiara 6-260A
Tiara 6-285 (O-405)
285 hp, 406 cu in capacity
Tiara 6-285A
Tiara 6-320 (O-405)
300 hp, 406 cu in capacity
Tiara T6-260 (O-405)
260 hp, 406 cu in capacity, turbocharged
Tiara T6-285 (O-405)
285 hp, 406 cu in capacity, turbocharged
Tiara T6-320 (O-405)
300 hp, 406 cu in capacity, turbocharged

=== Eight-cylinder ===
Tiara 8-380 (O-540)
380 hp, 541 cu in
Tiara T8-450 (O-540)
450 hp, 541 cu in, turbocharged

== Applications ==
=== Tiara 6 ===
- Cerva CE.44 Couguar
- Cierva CR.640 (not built)
- Piper PA-36-285 Pawnee Brave
- Robin HR100/285TR Tiara
- Spencer S-12-EAir Car (prototype)
- Transavia PL-12 T-320 Airtruk
- Trident Trigull (prototypes)

== Specifications (Tiara 6-285-A) ==
Data from FAA TDC

=== General characteristics ===
- Type: 6-cylinder, horizontally opposed piston engine
- Bore: 4.875 in (124 mm)
- Stroke: 3.625 in (92 mm)
- Displacement: 406 in³ (6.65 L)
- Dry weight: 375 lb (170 kg) dry

=== Components ===
- Fuel system: Fuel Injected
- Fuel type: 100/100LL avgas
- Oil system: 5 US quarts (4.7 L), wet sump
- Cooling system: Air-cooled

=== Performance ===
- Power output: 285 hp (212 kW) at 4000 rpm
- Compression ratio: 9.0:1

== See also ==
Related lists

- List of aircraft engines
