= Hockaday Comet =

Comet

General information
- Type: Touring aircraft
- National origin: United States
- Manufacturer: Hockaday Aircraft Corporation
- Designer: H.W. Yarick
- Number built: 1

History
- First flight: June 1944

The Hockaday Comet was a two-seat light civil aircraft, built in the United States before World War II but not flown until near the war's end. It failed to attract buyers and only one was completed.

== Design ==
The design of the Hockaday Comet, led by H.W. Yarick, began in October 1939 when the Hockaday Aircraft Corporation was founded. It followed the classic single engine, high braced monoplane layout pioneered for small cabin aircraft in the early 1930s by, for example, the Taylor Cub.

It was substantially complete by May 1939, powered by a 100 hp (75 kW) Allied Monsoon engine. This was a licence-built French Régnier L.4 four-cylinder, air-cooled inverted inline unit. However, work on the Comet was halted in 1940 when the company were preoccupied with sub-contract work for others. In spring 1944 work resumed and it made its first flight in June.

It had a one-piece wing of rectangular plan out to semi-elliptical tips and built around two spruce spars and plywood ribs. There was no dihedral. The leading edge was ply covered, with fabric elsewhere. The centre-section was joined to the upper fuselage frame by internal, vertical struts and the wing braced on each side with a parallel pair of streamlined steel tubes between the wing spars and the lower fuselage frame. Its short, broad ailerons were metal framed, fabric covered apart from duralumin leading edges and externally mass-balanced.

The Comet's fuselage had a welded steel tube structure, with a light wooden-framed upper section aft of the cabin. Apart from the engine housing, the fuselage was fabric covered. It was advertised with a choice of two flat-six engines, a 130 hp (97 kW) Franklin or a 125 hp (93 kW) Continental C125. Both drove a two-bladed propeller. Electric generator and starter were provided. Fuel and oil tanks were in the enclosed cabin, which had two side-by-side seats, with a large transparency in the wing centre section above them and accessed via a door on each side. The cabin was equipped with dual controls, radio and blind-flying instrumentation. Behind the seats there was 5.5 cu ft (0.16 m^{3}) of luggage space in which loads of up to 100 lb (45 kg) could be accommodated.

The empennage had a steel tube structure and was fabric covered, with wire bracing between the fin, the in-flight adjustable tailplane and the lower fuselage. The fin and tailplane were broadly straight-edged, carrying curved elevators and rudder. The latter extended to the keel and worked in a cut-out between the elevators.

The Comet's landing gear was of the fixed, tailwheel type, with cantilever oleo strut legs from the lower fuselage frame providing a track of 6 ft 3 in (1.91 m). Legs and wheels were enclosed in generous fairings. Its tailwhel, mounted on a long, vertical, sprung leg, was steerable from the rudder bar via a link from an external extension of the rudder hinge.

Despite intensive advertising, for example in Flying magazine, the Comet failed to attract buyers in the post-World War II market and only the prototype was built.

== Specifications ==
Data from Jane's All the World's Aircraft 1948. Engine used for performance and weights is not specified.

General characteristics

- Crew: One passenger or second pilot
- Length: 22 ft 2 in (6.76 m)
- Wingspan: 33 ft 0 in (10.06 m)
- Height: 11 ft 6 in (3.50 m) in flight attitude
- Wing area: 156 sq ft (14.5 m^{2})
- Airfoil: NACA M-6
- Empty weight: 953 lb (432 kg)
- Gross weight: 1,600 lb (726 kg)
- Fuel capacity: 24 US gal (20 imp gal; 91 L)
- Powerplant: 1 × Continental C125 air-cooled 6-cylinder flat engine, 125 hp (93 kW)
- Propellers: 2-bladed Falhin, wooden

Performance

- Maximum speed: 140 mph (230 km/h, 120 kn)
- Cruise speed: 130 mph (210 km/h, 110 kn)
- Range: 500 mi (800 km, 430 nmi)
- Service ceiling: 19,000 ft (5,800 m) practical
- Rate of climb: 1,150 ft/min (5.8 m/s)
- Landing speed: 50 mph (80 km/h; 43 kn)
