= Lake Renegade =

American six-seat amphibious aircraft

Renegade, Seafury, Seawolf
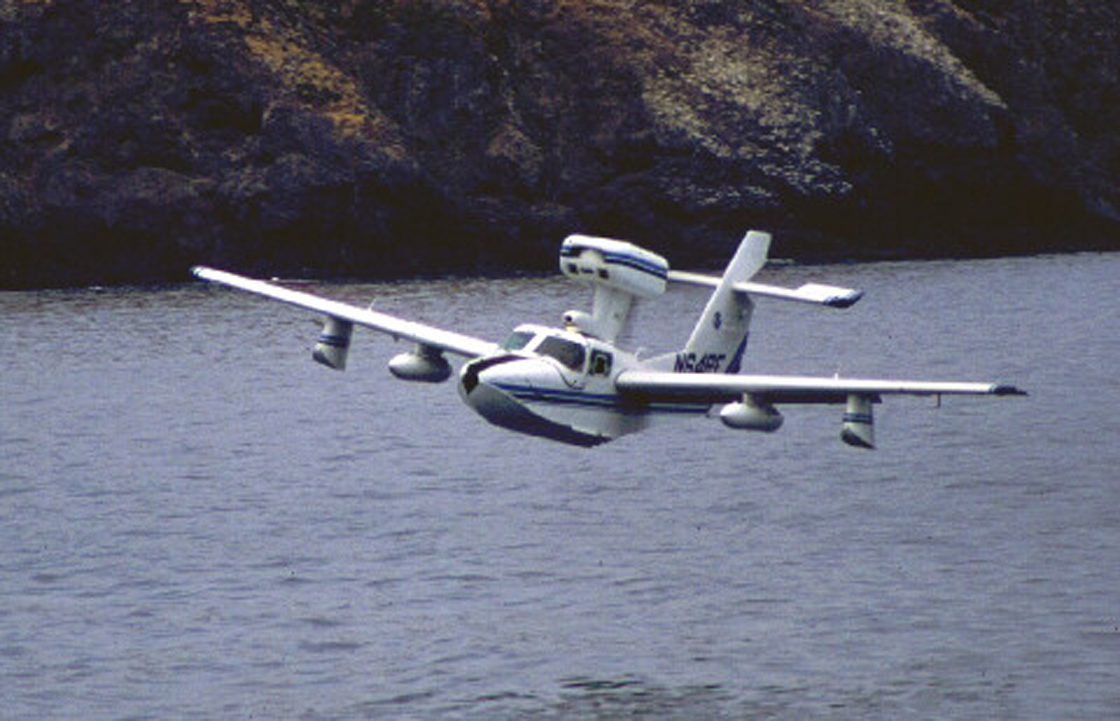
- Seawolf operated by NOAA

General information
- Type: Utility amphibian
- National origin: United States
- Manufacturer: Lake Aircraft

History
- First flight: 1982
- Developed from: Lake Buccaneer

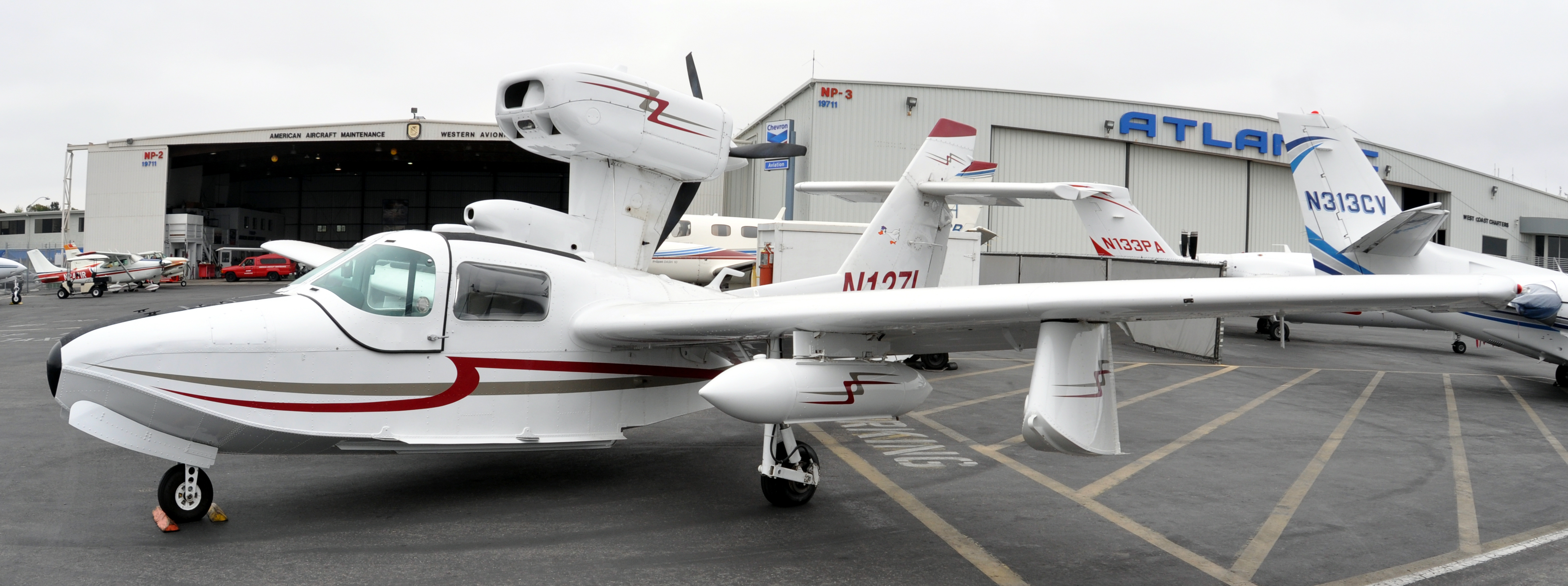
LA-270 Turbo Renegade

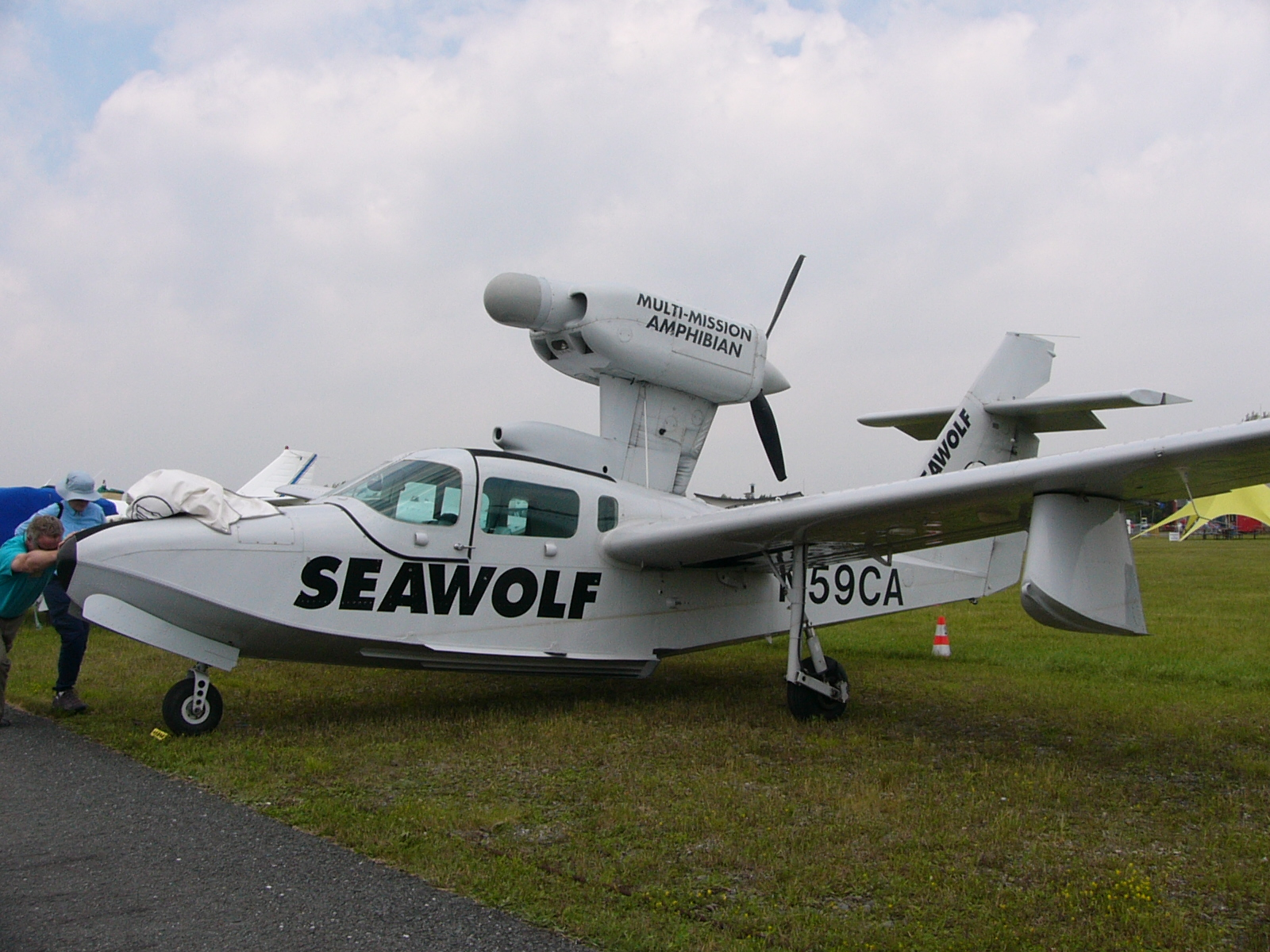
LA-4-250 Seawolf

The Lake LA-250 Renegade is a six-seat amphibious utility aircraft produced in the United States by Lake Aircraft since 1982.

== Design and development ==
The Renegade is a lengthened and more powerful version of the Lake Buccaneer. They share the Buccaneer's type certificate, and Buccaneer production was terminated. In turn, it gave rise to a number of variants, including the militarised LA-250 Seawolf, the turbocharged LA-270 Turbo Renegade, and the LA-270 Seafury optimised for marine environments. Like the Buccaneer, it is a conventional mid-wing design with retractable tricycle undercarriage and a single engine mounted in pusher configuration in a pod on a pylon above the fuselage.

The Seawolf version was designed for light maritime patrol duties and features a hardpoint under each wing to carry external stores, including bombs, rocket pods, gun pods, or rescue equipment. Provision for a radar unit was made on the forward end of the engine pod. The Seafury includes improved anti-corrosion measures and a hardened interior to improve its serviceability in saltwater environments, as well as a storage compartment carrying survival gear.

== Operational history ==
On August 31, 1988, veteran test pilot Peter L Foster and his co-pilot Robert Mann departed Sanford Seacoast Regional Airport in a Lake Turbo Renegade/Seawolf, flying to a maximum altitude of 24,600 feet and then leveling off at 24,500 feet. This flight set new world records for altitude and sustained flight at altitude for single-engine amphibians, FAI class C-3C-08.

A year later on November 2, 1989, two more flights departed from Bauneg Beg Lake in Sanford, Maine, setting four more world records for single-engine seaplanes. In the first flight of the day, Robert Mann flew a Lake Turbo Renegade N270TL with co-pilot Gordon Collins to an altitude of 25,500 feet. They were able to sustain this altitude, setting two records for FAI class C-2C-08. Later in the day, Robert Mann flew N250L solo from Bauneg Beg Lake to an initial altitude of 27,300 feet, and then leveling off at a sustained altitude of 27,100 feet for two more world records in FAI class C-2B-08.

== Variants ==
- LA-250 Renegade — Buccaneer with 38-inch (97-cm) fuselage stretch, six seats, and Lycoming IO-540-C4B5 engine
  - LA-250 Seawolf — militarised Renegade with hardpoints and provision for radar
- LA-270 Turbo Renegade — Renegade with Lycoming TIO-540-AA1AD engine uprated to 270 hp (200 kW)
  - LA-270 Seafury — Renegade for saltwater conditions

== Specifications (LA-250) ==
Data from Jane's All the World's Aircraft 1984–85, 431 and The Incomplete Guide to Airfoil Usage

General characteristics

- Crew: one pilot
- Capacity: five passengers
- Length: 28 ft 4 in (8.64 m)
- Wingspan: 38 ft 0 in (11.58 m)
- Height: 10 ft 0 in (3.05 m)
- Wing area: 170 sq ft (15.8 m^{2})
- Airfoil: NACA 4418 (root), NACA 4412 (tip)
- Empty weight: 1,850 lb (839 kg)
- Gross weight: 3,050 lb (1,383 kg)
- Powerplant: 1 × Lycoming IO-540-C4B5 , 250 hp (186 kW)

Performance

- Maximum speed: 160 mph (258 km/h, 140 kn)
- Range: 1,036 mi (1,668 km, 900 nmi)
- Service ceiling: 14,700 ft (4,480 m)
- Rate of climb: 900 ft/min (4.6 m/s)
