= David Thurston =

American aircraft designer

David Byron Thurston
- Born: 20 September 1918; Mineola, New York
- Died: 10 December 2013 (aged 95); South Portland, Maine
- Education: Georgia Institute of Technology
- Known for: Amphibious aircraft design

David Thurston (20 September 1918 – 10 December 2013) was an American aircraft designer noted for his work on small amphibious aircraft, including the Colonial Skimmer, Lake Buccaneer, Thurston Teal and AeroMarine Seafire. He also wrote three books about light airplane design: Design for Flying, Design for Safety, and Homebuilt Aircraft.

== Biography ==
Thurston was born in Mineola, New York. In June 1940 he received a degree in Aeronautical Engineering from New York University- NYU. His first employment was with Brewster Aeronautical Corporation where he was a design engineer from May 1940.

In May 1942 he joined Grumman Aircraft. After World War II, Thurston was involved in the development of three personal type aircraft directly under the Grumman president, Leroy Grumman. The aircraft included the G-65 Tadpole amphibian, as well as the G-63 and G-72 Kitten sport airplanes. None of these aircraft entered production, when the post-war personal aircraft market did not boom as predicted.

Thurston became design group leader for the G-79 naval jet fighter, designated F9F Panther by US Navy. From December 1947 to June 1953 Thurston was in charge of the Grumman Rigel guided missile development program followed by the F11F Tiger naval jet fighter. At his resignation from Grumman in January 1955, Thurston was in charge of the design and development of propeller driven aircraft at Grumman, being a senior member of a staff responsible for the operation of a 1500-man engineering department.

Thurston died at South Portland, Maine on 10 December 2013.
