= Percival H. Spencer =

American inventor (1897-1995)

Percival Hopkins Spencer
- Born: 30 April 1897; Windsor, Connecticut, U.S.
- Died: January 16, 1995 (aged 97); Torrance, California, U.S.
- Parent: Christopher Miner Spencer

Percival Hopkins Spencer (April 30, 1897 – January 16, 1995) was an American inventor, aviation pioneer, test pilot, and businessman. He was one of the Early Birds of Aviation, a group which required members to have flown a glider, gas balloon or airplane prior to December 17, 1916. That association credited Spencer with "the longest active flight record in aviation history": he first soloed in 1914 and was a licensed pilot until 1987.

== Biography ==
He was born on April 30, 1897, to Christopher Miner Spencer (1833-1922), the inventor of, among other things, the Spencer repeating rifle.

At the age of 14, Spencer built his first pontooned hang glider in April 1911 from plans he found in a Popular Mechanics magazine. On May 15, 1914, Spencer made his first powered flight, in a Curtiss flying boat. In 1929, he broke the light airplane altitude record—18,571 ft (5,660 m)—piloting a Curtiss Robin monoplane. Spencer was the president of Amphibians Inc. for three years, selling amphibian designs.

In 1937, he joined Sikorsky engineer Victor A. Larsen to form the Spencer-Larsen Aircraft Corporation and design their first, and only, amphibious aircraft, the Spencer-Larsen SL-12C. Development of the plane progressed slowly and in September 1940, Spencer left the partnership to form his own company, the Spencer Aircraft Company.

His resulting design was the Spencer S-12 Air Car Amphibian. Construction began on March 1, 1941. The small, two-seat S-12 prototype, registration NX29098, made its first flight on August 8, 1941. The S-12 was a fabric-covered amphibian with a unique boxlike forward cabin; a high wing with a two-bladed propeller in pusher configuration; and a long, slender tail boom.

In December 1941, Spencer put the Air Car into storage and joined the war effort as a test pilot for the Republic Aircraft Corporation. He flight tested the company's P-43 Lancers and P-47 Thunderbolts.

In April 1943, Spencer left Republic Aircraft for the Mills Novelty Company of Chicago, Illinois, which wanted to use his Air Car to promote the company. Spencer used the company's wood forming equipment to build a new egg-shaped cabin for the Air Car and began demonstrating the aircraft to his former employers, Republic Aircraft.

Seeing the potential of the Air Car as the perfect sports plane for pilots returning from the war, Republic purchased the rights to the Air Car in December 1943 and immediately began development of an all-metal version designated the Model RC-1 Thunderbolt Amphibian. On November 30, 1944, the first RC-1 Thunderbolt Amphibian, registered NX41816, made its first flight with Spencer at the controls. The design led to the Republic RC-3 Seabee. On November 22, 1945, the prototype RC-3 (NX87451) came off the assembly line at Republic's factory in Farmingdale, New York, and on December 1 made its first flight in Farmingdale with Spencer at the controls.

In 1968, Spencer and retired United States Air Force Colonel Dale L. "Andy" Anderson formed a new company to market a four-place amphibious homebuilt design once again called the Spencer Amphibian Air Car, with S-12C, S-12D, and S-12E, and S-14 variants. The first example was test flown in 1970 in Chino, California. The unit had a build cost of $8700.00. The S-12-D Aircar was an improved and larger four-seat aircraft, which retains the basic layout of the Seabee. The two-seat S-14 used advanced composites and was test flown by Spencer in 1983 at the age of 86. Its design did not meet expectations and the sole example was donated to the Experimental Aircraft Association Museum in Oshkosh, Wisconsin.

Spencer died at a nursing home in Torrance, California, in 1995, aged 97.
