= Continental O-280 =

Aircraft engine family

O-280
- Type: Piston aircraft engine
- National origin: United States
- Manufacturer: Continental Motors

The Continental C115, C125 and C140 aircraft engines were manufactured by Continental Motors in the 1940s, all sharing the US military designation O-280. These engines feature a flat-6 configuration and produce 115 hp (86 kW) 125 hp (93 kW) or 140 hp (104 kW) respectively.

The C115 was in production from 1945 to 1951, the C125 was in production from 1945 to 1952, and the C140 from 1945 to 1946.

The C125 has the same crankcase as the Continental C145, although the engines differ in stroke, compression ratio and carburetor jetting. The C125 features a cast iron camshaft and hydraulic tappets.

== Applications ==
=== C125 ===
- Aero-Flight Streak
- Baumann Brigadier
- Call-Air A-3
- Globe Swift
- Grumman Tadpole
- Hockaday Comet
- SAI KZ VII
- Meyers MAC 125
- Miles Gemini

== Specifications (C125) ==
Reference: Engines for Homebuilt Aircraft & Ultralights

=== General characteristics ===
- Type: 6-cylinder air-cooled horizontally opposed aircraft piston engine
- Bore: 4 1/16 in (4.0625 in resp. 103.12 mm)
- Stroke: 3 5/8 in (3.625 in resp. 92.075 mm)
- Displacement: 282 in^{3} (4.6 L)
- Length: 39.75 in (101.0 cm)
- Width: 31.5 in (80.0 cm)
- Height: 23.25 in (59.0 cm)
- Dry weight: 286 lb (130 kg)

=== Components ===
- Cooling system: Air-cooled

=== Performance ===
- Power output: 125 hp (93 kW) at 2,550 rpm
- Specific power: 0.44 hp/in^{3} (20.2 kW/L)
- Compression ratio: 6.3:1
- Power-to-weight ratio: 0.43 hp/lb (0.72 kW/kg)

== See also ==
Related lists

- List of aircraft engines
