= Thurston TA16 Trojan =

TA16 Trojan and Seafire

General information
- Type: Utility amphibian
- National origin: United States
- Manufacturer: Homebuilt
- Designer: David Thurston

History
- First flight: 1975

The Thurston TA16 Trojan was a light amphibious aircraft developed in the United States during the 1970s for homebuilding. During the 1980s and again in the early 2000s, efforts were made to certificate the design for series production under the name Seafire. It was a four-seat all-metal flying boat with a shoulder-mounted cantilever wing and a T-tail. The engine was mounted tractor-fashion on a tall pylon above the wings, and the aircraft was equipped with retractable tricycle undercarriage for alighting on land.

Sales of plans to homebuilders were suspended after 32 sets had been sold while initial efforts were made to certificate the design. These proved fruitless but a second attempt in the early 1980s resulted in the flight of a prototype Seafire (registered N16SA) on 10 December 1982. The new entity created to handle the certification and production, International Aeromarine Corporation (IAC), expected the process to be complete by 1987, but this too fell by the wayside, and rights to the design reverted to Thurston with 85% of the process complete. In the meantime, refinements made to the design during the certification trials were incorporated into the plans for homebuilders.

In 1998, a new company, Aquastar Inc was formed to revive the certification project. The Seafire prototype was refurbished and re-registered in 2000, recommencing certification trials in 2002. The Seafire was publicly re-launched at EAA AirVenture Oshkosh that same year, but the project stalled again in mid-2003.

== Specifications (TA16 Seafire) ==
Data from Jane's All The World's Aircraft 1993–94

General characteristics

- Crew: one
- Capacity: three passengers
- Length: 27 ft 2 in (8.28 m)
- Wingspan: 37 ft 0 in (11.28 m)
- Height: 10 ft 9 in (3.28 m)
- Wing area: 183.0 sq ft (17.00 m^{2})
- Aspect ratio: 7.40:1
- Empty weight: 1,950 lb (885 kg)
- Max takeoff weight: 3,200 lb (1,451 kg)
- Fuel capacity: 340 L (75 imp gal; 90 US gal)
- Powerplant: 1 × Lycoming O-540-A4D5 air-cooled flat-six, 250 hp (190 kW)

Performance

- Maximum speed: 175 mph (282 km/h, 152 kn) at 7,000 ft (2,100 m)
- Cruise speed: 155 mph (249 km/h, 135 kn) (67% power)
- Stall speed: 60 mph (97 km/h, 52 kn)
- Range: 1,000 mi (1,600 km, 870 nmi) (max fuel)
- Service ceiling: 18,000 ft (5,500 m)
- Rate of climb: 1,060 ft/min (5.4 m/s)
