= Colonial Skimmer =

1948 American amphibian flying boat

C-1 Skimmer
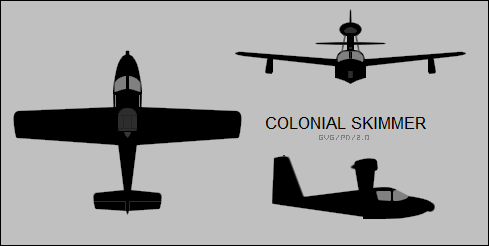

General information
- Type: two/three-seat amphibian
- Manufacturer: Colonial Aircraft Corporation
- Designer: David Thurston
- Primary user: private owner pilots
- Number built: 43

History
- First flight: 1948
- Variant: Lake Buccaneer

The Colonial Model C-1 Skimmer was an American small single-engined amphibian flying boat built by the Colonial Aircraft Corporation. It was the start of a line of very similar aircraft designed by David Thurston.

== Design and development ==
In 1946 David Thurston established the Colonial Aircraft Corporation at Sanford Maine to build his design for a small amphibian flying boat, the Skimmer.

The resulting design was an all-metal shoulder-wing cantilever monoplane with a single-step hull and stabilizing floats fitted under each wing. A retractable tricycle landing gear allowed land operation. The Avco Lycoming engine with a pusher propeller was pylon-mounted above and aft of the enclosed cockpit.

The cabin had side-by-side seating for a pilot and passenger with room behind for another passenger.

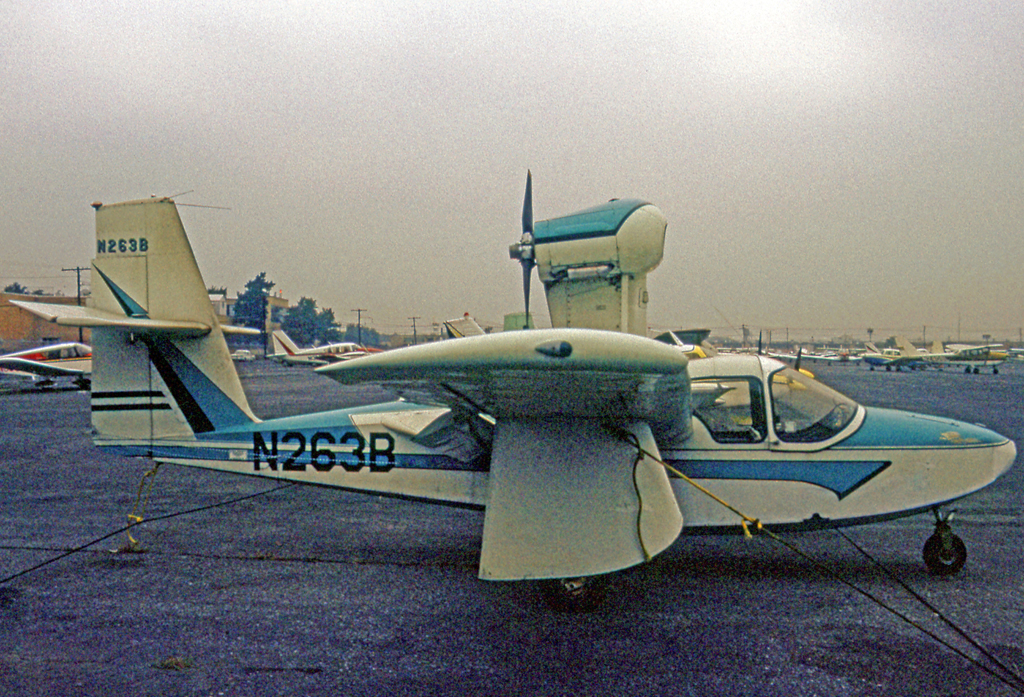
1957-built C-1 Skimmer at Teterboro Airport New Jersey in 1970.

The prototype XC-1 Skimmer first flew on July 17, 1948, powered by a 115 hp (86 kW) Lycoming O-235 engine, but was later re-engined with a 125 hp (93 kW) Lycoming O-290 engine.

24 examples of the C-1 Skimmer were built and these were followed by 18 examples of the higher powered four-seat variant known as the C-2 Skimmer IV, which through a succession of companies became the Lake Buccaneer.

== Specifications (C-1) ==
Data from Jane's All The World's Aircraft 1956–1957, Jane's All the World's Aircraft 1958-59

General characteristics

- Crew: 1
- Capacity: 2 passengers
- Length: 23 ft 6 in (7.16 m)
- Wingspan: 34 ft 0 in (10.36 m)
- Height: 8 ft 10 in (2.69 m)
- Wing area: 150.6 sq ft (13.99 m^{2})
- Empty weight: 1,450 lb (658 kg)
- Gross weight: 2,150 lb (975 kg)
- Fuel capacity: 30 US gal (110 L; 25 imp gal) normal; 39 US gal (150 L; 32 imp gal) overload
- Powerplant: 1 × Lycoming O-320 4-cylinder air-cooled horizontally-opposed piston engine, 150 hp (110 kW)
- Propellers: 2-bladed Hartzell, 6 ft 2 in (1.88 m) diameter constant-speed pusher propeller

Performance

- Maximum speed: 125 mph (201 km/h, 109 kn) at 5,000 ft (1,500 m)
- Cruise speed: 112–123 mph (180–198 km/h, 97–107 kn)
- Stall speed: 50 mph (80 km/h, 43 kn)
- Range: 500–600 mi (800–970 km, 430–520 nmi)
- Rate of climb: 700 ft/min (3.6 m/s)
- Wing loading: 14.27 lb/sq ft (69.7 kg/m^{2})
- Power/mass: 0.0698 hp/lb (0.1148 kW/kg)
- Take-off run: 1,500 ft (457 m) on water in still air
- Take-off run: 550 ft (168 m) on land in still air

== See also ==
Aircraft of comparable role, configuration, and era

- Grumman G-65 Tadpole

Related lists

- List of flying boats and floatplanes
