= Lake Aircraft =

Amphibious aircraft manufacturer

- Company type: Private
- Industry: Aerospace
- Founded: 1959
- Headquarters: Kissimmee, Florida; New Hampshire
- Key people: Armand Rivard
- Products: parts for LA-4 aircraft
- Number of employees: 6
- Website: lakeamphib.com

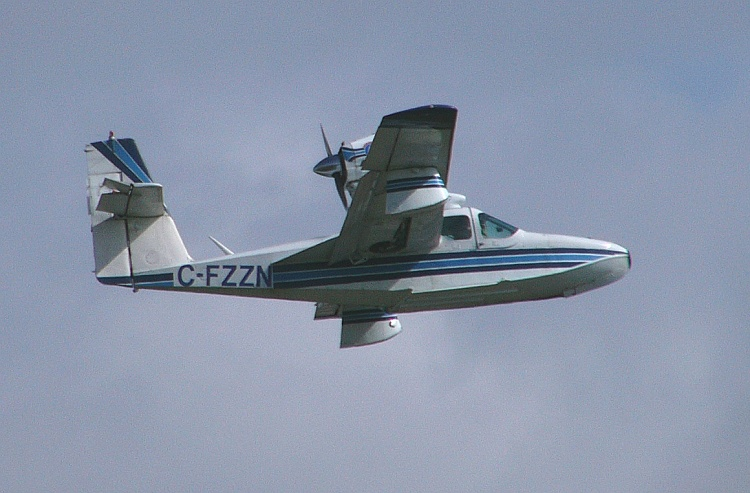
Lake LA-4-200 Buccaneer

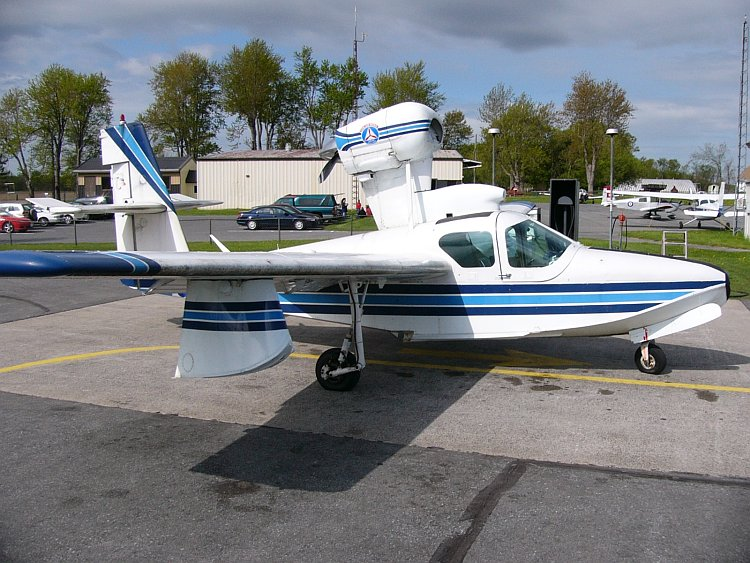
Lake LA-4-200 Buccaneer

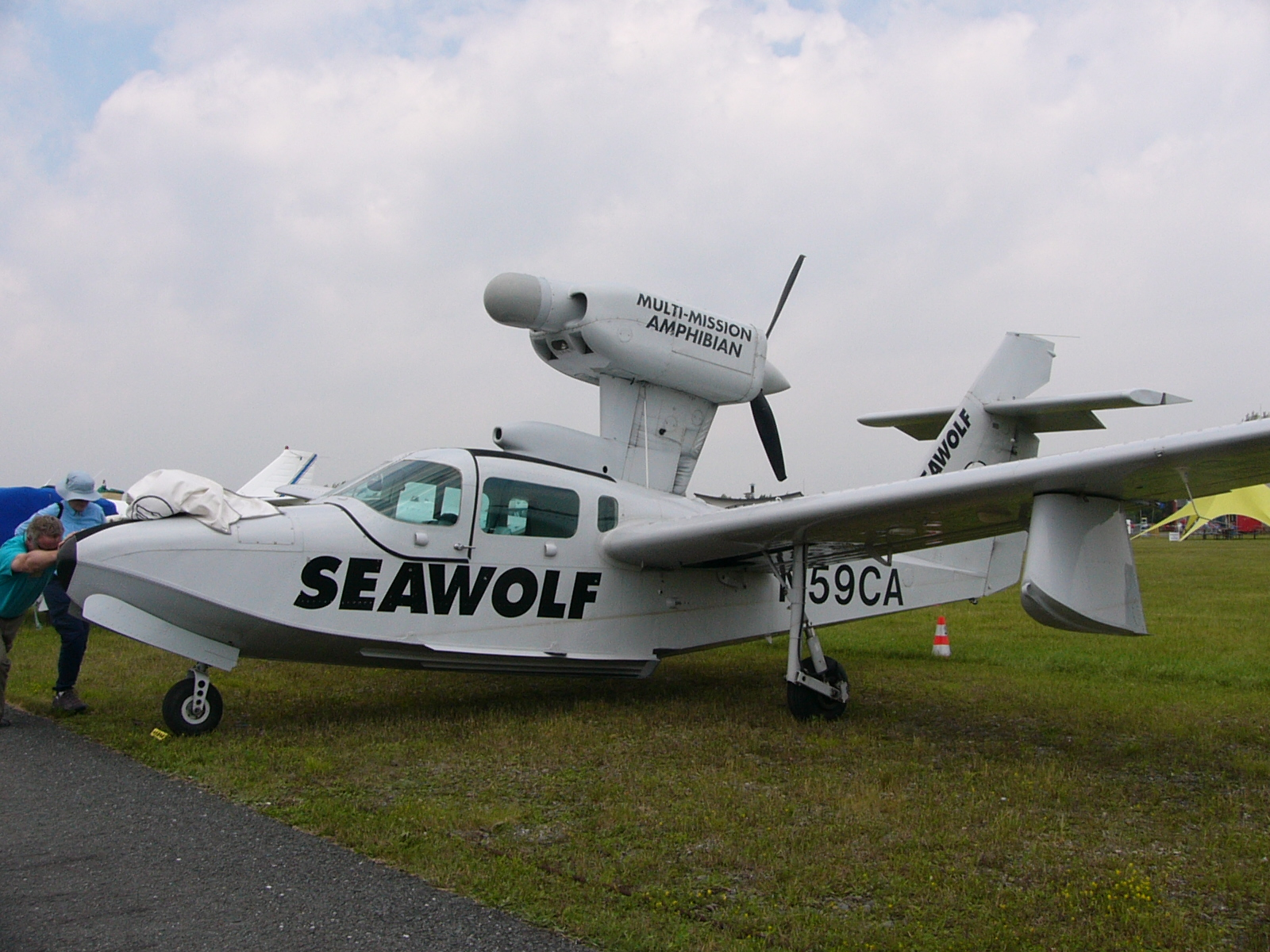
Lake Model 250 Seawolf

Lake Aircraft was a manufacturer of amphibious aircraft. Its factory was in Sanford, Maine, United States, and its sales offices were located at Laconia / Gilford, New Hampshire and Kissimmee, Florida.

The assets are currently owned by Revo Inc, owned by Armand Rivard, although the company was put up for sale again in August 2018.

== History ==
In January 2009 company owner Armand Rivard indicated that he intended to sell the company and retire. The company had previously been offered for sale in 2001, 2002, via auction in 2005 and in 2007. Lake Aircraft produced one aircraft in 2007 and none in 2008, but continues to make parts for existing aircraft. In 2009 the company employed six people, down from the 200 employees that it had in the 1980s. In August 2018 the company was once again offered for sale, including all the LA-4 tooling, type certificate and the designs. Armand Rivard died on December 23, 2018

== Aircraft ==
Evolution of Lake Amphibious Aircraft
Years Produced	Model	seats	Horsepower	Max Cruise Speed	Payload with Main Full Fuel
1948–1959	C1 and C2	2	150-180	90 mph	340 lb payload
1960–1969	Lake LA-4	4	180	110 mph	440 lb
1970–1982	Lake LA4-200	4	200	105 knots	500 lb
1982–1985	Lake LA4-200 EP	4	200	110 knots	550 lb
1984–1995	Lake Model 250	6	250	132 knots	800 lb
1987–2005	Lake Model 250 Turbocharged	6	270	155 knots	720 lb
2006	Seafury		250 & 270		
