= Thurston Teal =

American two to four-seat amphibious aircraft

Teal
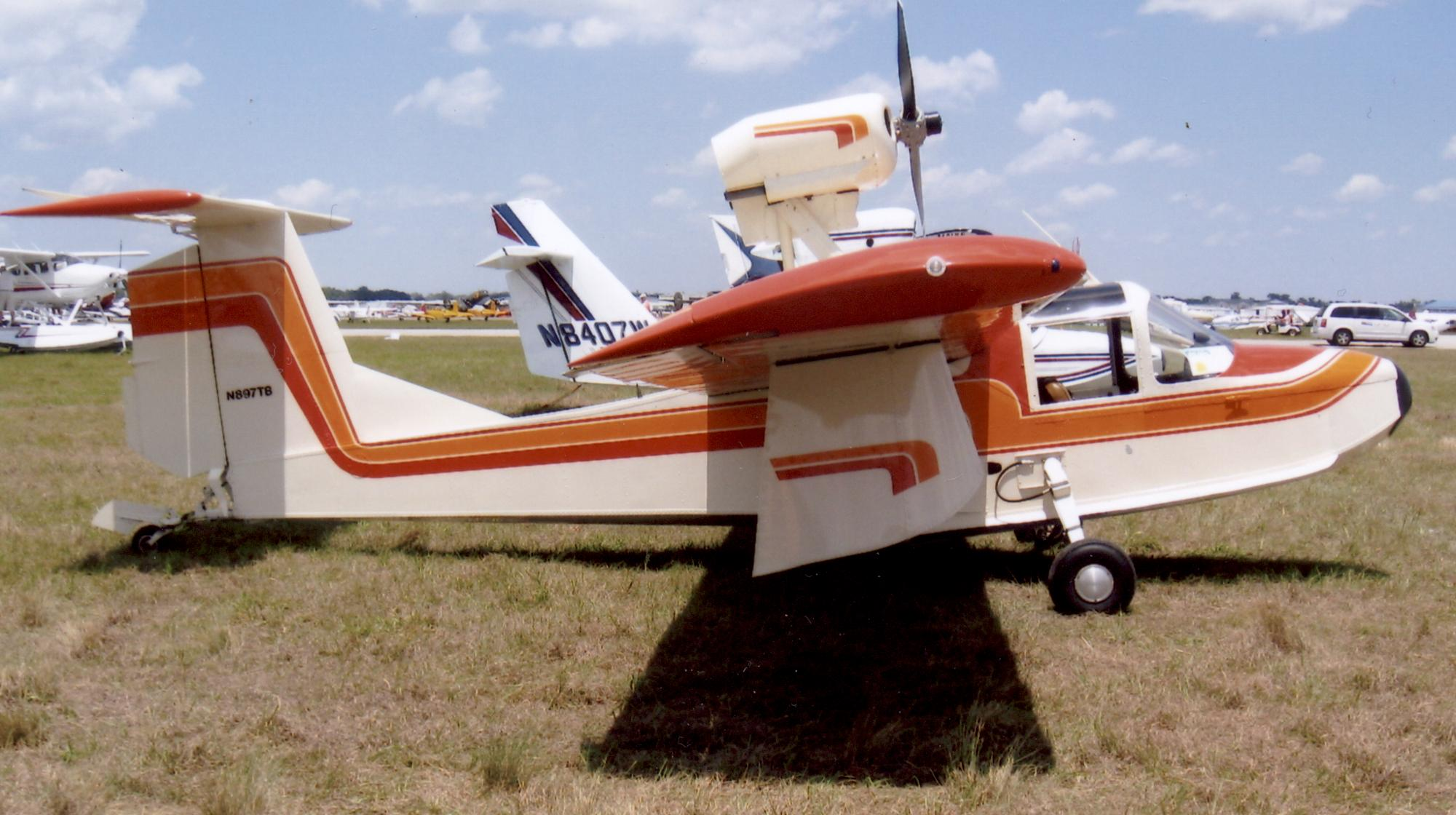
- 1971-built TSC-1 Teal at Lakeland, Florida in April 2009

General information
- Type: Two-seat amphibious aircraft
- Manufacturer: Thurston Aircraft Corporation
- Designer: David Thurston
- Number built: 38

History
- First flight: June 1968

The Thurston Teal is a family of two- and four-seat all-aluminium amphibious aircraft designed by David Thurston in the United States and first flown in 1968.

A total of 38 Teals were manufactured.

== Development ==
David B. Thurston established Thurston Aircraft Corporation at Sanford, Maine, in 1966 to produce a lightweight amphibian of his own design, which had the designation Thurston TSC-1A Teal.

First flown in 1968, production began after certification was gained in August 1969; the 16th and subsequent aircraft, which introduced some refinements, were designated TSC-1A1 Teal. In 1972 David Thurston joined the Schweizer Aircraft Corporation, which continued to build the Teal in the form of the TSC-1A2 Teal II before selling the production rights to the Teal Aircraft Corporation of Markham, Ontario, in early 1979.

Thurston Aircraft produced a total of 19, Schweizer built 12 and Teal Aircraft constructed seven.

== Design ==
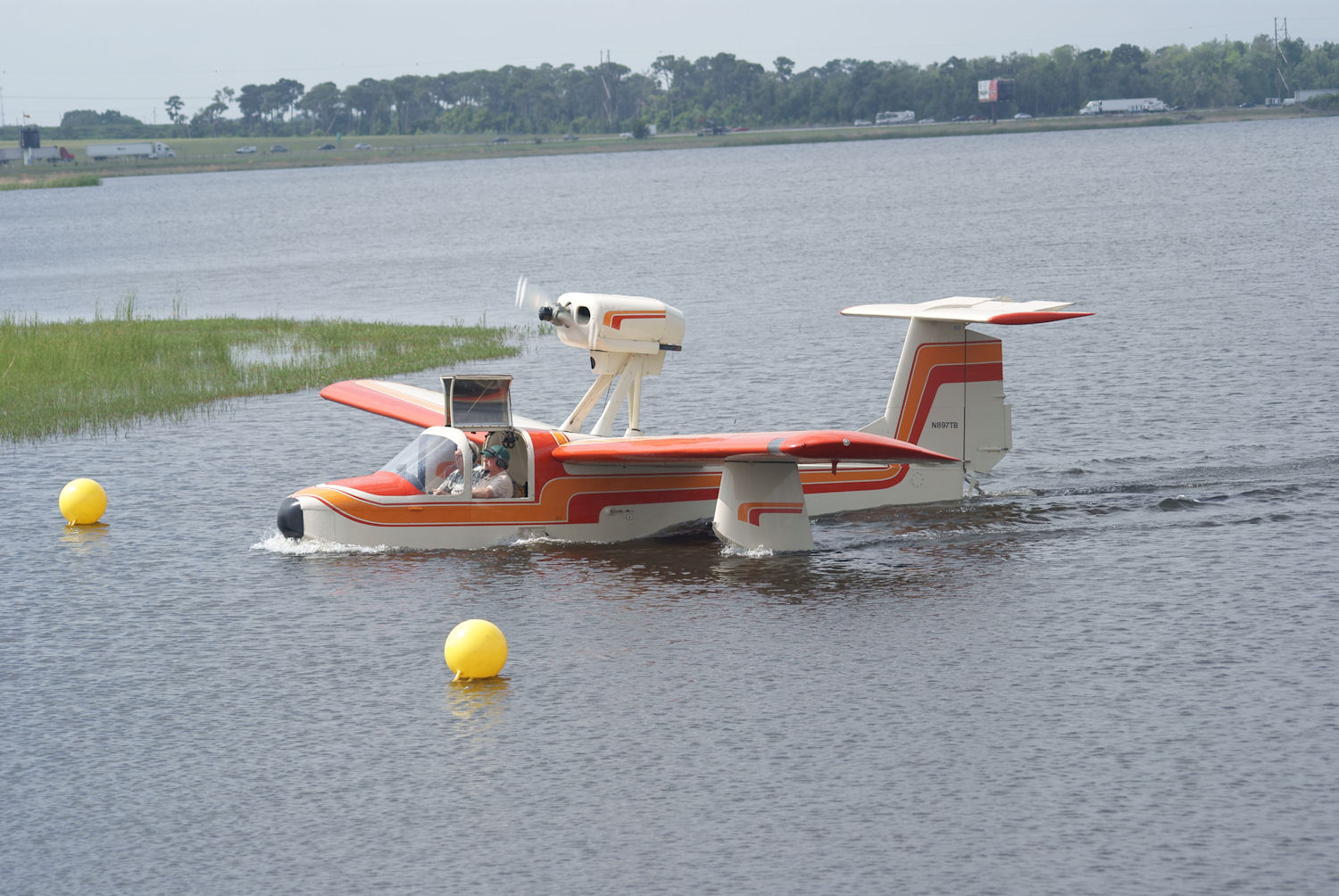
Thurston TSC-1A1

The Teal design features a high wing with tip floats for lateral stability. The horizontally opposed engine is mounted tractor fashion in a strut-supported pylon above the wing root. The T-tail includes a water rudder and tailwheel that swings up against the bottom of the rudder. Conventional undercarriage includes flat, spring-steel main undercarriage legs that rotate aft for water landings.

Pilot and passenger sit side by side under a clear perspex canopy. Side windows slide up into opening overhead windows.

One unusual characteristic of the Teal design is that it cruises slightly faster with the landing gear in the down position than with it up. The Teal's wheels do not retract, but instead swing to the rear until the gear is horizontal and clear of the water. The drag produced having the landing gear stowed in the up position is higher than in the extended position, and this reduces cruise speed.

== Variants ==
TSC-1 T-boat

The TSC-1 T-Boat was a proposed flying boat. The aircraft was to have no landing gear to save weight and folding wings were to be incorporated to aid storage. The model development was discontinued to concentrate on the amphibious TSC-1A instead.

TSC-1A

The TSC-1A was the first to the series to actually be completed and featured retractable conventional landing gear and non-folding wings. The prototype TSC-1A was registered as N1968T, given serial number 1 and was first flown in June 1968. The TSC-1A certified under FAA Type Certificate A15AE on 28 August 1969 at a gross weight of 1,850 lb (840 kg), land and water. An increase in gross weight to 1,900 lb (860 kg) was approved on 9 December 1969. Fifteen Model TSC-1A Teals were built by the Thurston Aircraft.

TSC-1A1

The TSC-1A1 Teal Amphibian was an improved model with extra range and payload. The aircraft incorporated 23 US gallon fuel tanks in the wing leading edges, which replaced the single 24.5 US gal fuselage tank of the earlier TSC-1A. The gross weight was increased to 2,200 lb (998 kg) (land) and 2,100 lb (953 kg) (water). The prototype TSC-1A, N1968T was upgraded and used as the prototype for the TSC-1A1. The TSC-1A1 was certified on 23 September 1971 and Thurston Aircraft built the first three. Three more were built by Schweizer Aircraft. Six additional existing TSC-1As were upgraded to TCS-1A1 status.

TSC-1A1/EW

The TSC-1A1/EW introduced wing and tailplane extensions. Wing span was increased four feet to 34 feet 11 inches (10.64 m), producing a wing area of 177 sq ft (16.4 m^{2}). The horizontal tail span was increased by 2 feet (0.61 m) to a total of 10 feet (3.0 m). The empty weight rose to 1,435 lb (651 kg), with a gross weight of 2,200 lb (1,000 kg) for both land and water.

TSC-1A1/EW/EP

The TSC-1A1/EW/EP was a project to convert existing TSC-1A1s to TSC-1A1/EW status by incorporating the EW's wing and tail extensions and upgrading the engine to a 160 horsepower (120 kW) Lycoming O-320-B3B. Gross weight would have been 2,300 lb (1,043 kg) (land) and 2,200 lb (998 kg) (water).

TSC-1A2 Teal II and Marlin 150

The TSC-1A2 Teal II was a development of the TSC-1A1, It incorporated slotted flaps, a change in horizontal stabilizer incidence and larger elevator trim tab travel. The fitted engine was a 150 hp (110 kW) Lycoming O-320-A3B. The new flaps reduced stalling speed and thus permitted an increase in gross weight to 2,200 lb (1,000 kg) for land and water operations, as well as shorter take off and landing distances. The TSC-1A2 was certified on 28 June 1973, including IFR in non-icing conditions. Schweizer built nine Teal IIs and seven were built by Teal Aircraft as the "Marlin 150".

TSC-1A2/EP

The TSC-1A2/EP was a proposed upgrade of the TSC-1A2 a 160 hp (120 kW) Lycoming O-320-B3B engine. Empty weight was 1,435 lb (651 kg) and the gross weight was to be 2,300 lb (1,043 kg) (land) and 2,200 lb (998 kg) (water).

TSC-1A3 Teal III and Marlin 180

The TSC-1A3 was a proposed 180 hp (130 kW) up-engined version of the TSC-1A2. It was developed by Teal Aircraft and was to be sold by the name "Marlin 180" during 1977–78. The Teal III incorporated aerodynamic and structural upgrades to the engine mounting pylon and the engine cowling. The projected empty weight was to be 1,450 lb (660 kg), with a gross weight of 2,300 lb (1,043 kg) (land & water). No TSC-1A3s were manufactured, but TSC-1A2 #34 was converted to 180 hp (130 kW).

TSC-1A3/EW

The TSC-1A3/EW was a proposed 180 hp (130 kW) engine aircraft with the wings and tailplane extensions of the TSC-1A1/EW. The aircraft was proposed without flaps, but with a gross weight of 2,300 lb (1,043 kg) (land & water).

TSC-1A3/EWF

The TSC-1A3/EWF was a proposed aircraft that would have been identical to the TSC-1A3/EW, except with flaps.

TSC-1A2T Teal II & TSC-1A3T Teal III

In 1983 there was a proposal to form a new company, to be called Advanced Aircraft, which would develop a tricycle version of the Teal, to be designated the TSC-1A2T. This was to be a conversion of existing TSC-1A2 aircraft. The conversion would have included:

- relocating the main landing gear
- removing the tail wheel
- installing a nose wheel
- changing the hull to accommodate the new landing gear
- changing the rudder
- simplifying the flap controls
- installing of new style cabin doors

An up-engined version, designated TSC-1A3T, would have been powered by either 160 Lycoming O-320 or Lycoming O-360 180 hp (130 kW) conversion. In the end the company was not formed and the prototype never completed.

TSC-1A4 Teal IV

The TSC-1A4 was a 1977 Teal Aircraft proposal for a four-seat stretched Teal III, which would have had a gross weight of 2,700 lb (1,200 kg). The plan was for a 210 hp (160 kW) turbocharged Lycoming powerplant, a 19-inch (480 mm) extension for the fuselage, the wingspan increased by 4 feet (1.2 m) and the tailplane by 2 feet (0.61 m). None were ever built.

== In media ==
A Thurston Teal is used by Sergeant Howie to travel to the remote Hebridean island of Summerisle in the 1973 film The Wicker Man.

== Specifications (TSC-1A1 Teal) ==
Data from Jane's All the World's Aircraft 1971–72

General characteristics

- Crew: 1
- Capacity: 1–2 passengers
- Length: 23 ft 7 in (7.19 m)
- Wingspan: 31 ft 11 in (9.73 m)
- Height: 9 ft 5 in (2.87 m)
- Wing area: 157 sq ft (14.6 m^{2})
- Aspect ratio: 6.5:1
- Airfoil: NACA 4415
- Empty weight: 1,360 lb (617 kg)
- Max takeoff weight: 2,200 lb (998 kg) (on land); 2,100 lb (953 kg) on water
- Fuel capacity: 40 US gal (33 imp gal; 150 L) usable fuel
- Powerplant: 1 × Lycoming O-320-A3B air-cooled flat-four engine, 150 hp (110 kW)
- Propellers: 2-bladed Hartzell constant-speed propeller, 6 ft 0 in (1.83 m) diameter

Performance

- Maximum speed: 125 mph (201 km/h, 109 kn) at sea level
- Cruise speed: 108 mph (174 km/h, 94 kn)
- Stall speed: 57 mph (92 km/h, 50 kn)
- Range: 500 mi (800 km, 430 nmi) (with standard fuel)
- Rate of climb: 750 ft/min (3.8 m/s)
