= Lake Buccaneer =

American amphibious light airplane

Buccaneer
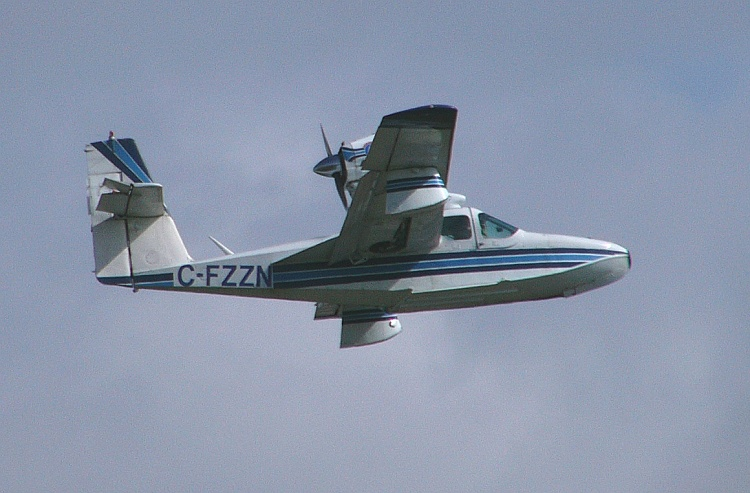

General information
- Type: Four-seat light amphibious aircraft
- Manufacturer: Lake Aircraft
- Designer: David Thurston
- Number built: 1000+

History
- First flight: 1950s
- Developed from: Colonial Skimmer
- Variant: Lake Renegade

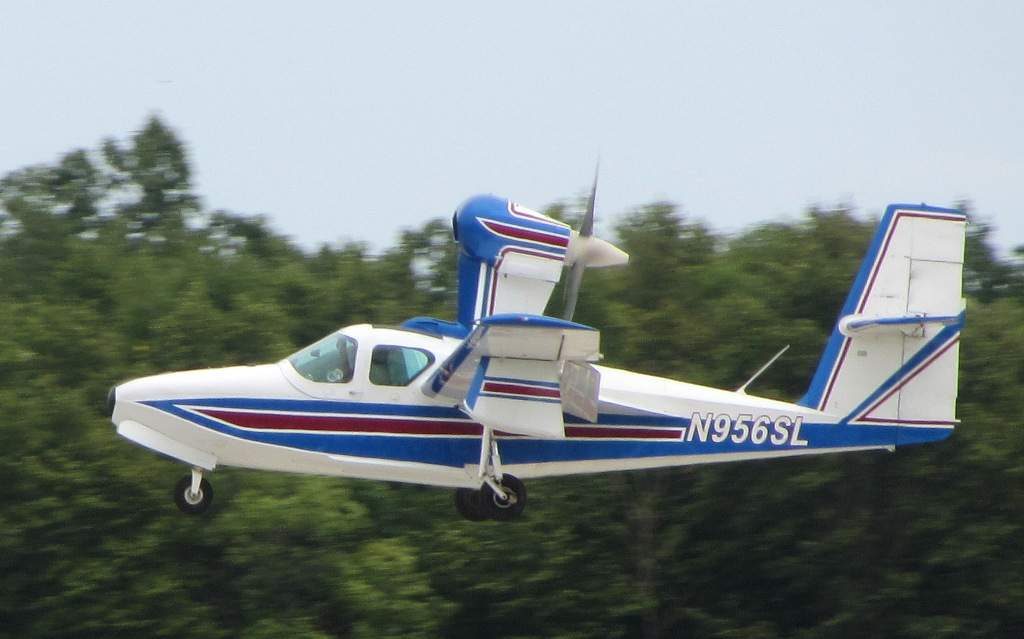
1977 LA-4-200 Landing

The Lake Buccaneer is an American four-seat, light amphibious aircraft derived from the Colonial C-2 Skimmer, itself a development of the three-seat Colonial C-1 Skimmer.

== Development ==
The Colonial Aircraft of Sanford, Maine developed the C-2 Skimmer in the 1950s as a four-seat variant of the earlier three-seat C-1 Skimmer. The name was changed to Lake in 1959, along with some design improvements. Produced until 1970, this version was designated as the Lake LA-4 Amphibian.

From 1969-1972 the company sold some LA-4s modified under a Supplemental Type Certificate as flying boats, without landing gear, but with removable beaching wheels, under the name Lake LA-4S Seaplane.

In 1970 a 200 hp (149 kW) fuel injected Lycoming IO-360 engine was fitted and the resulting aircraft was named the Buccaneer. This model replaced both the LA-4 and Seaplane in production and has a higher cruise speed as well as 200 lb (91 kg) increased gross weight. Fuel tanks were also added to the wing pontoons, with 7.5 US gal (28 L) per side, taking fuel capacity from 40 US gal (151 L) to 55 US gal (208 L).

A six-seat development in 1982, with a lengthened hull was named Renegade, this had either a 250 hp (186 kW) or a turbocharged 270 hp (201 kW) engine. A military version was called the Seawolf.

== Design ==
The LA-4 is a cantilever, shoulder-wing monoplane amphibian with a single-step all-metal hull with retractable tricycle landing gear. It is powered by a Lycoming O-360 180 hp (134 kW) piston engine in pusher configuration, pylon-mounted above the hull.

== Variants ==
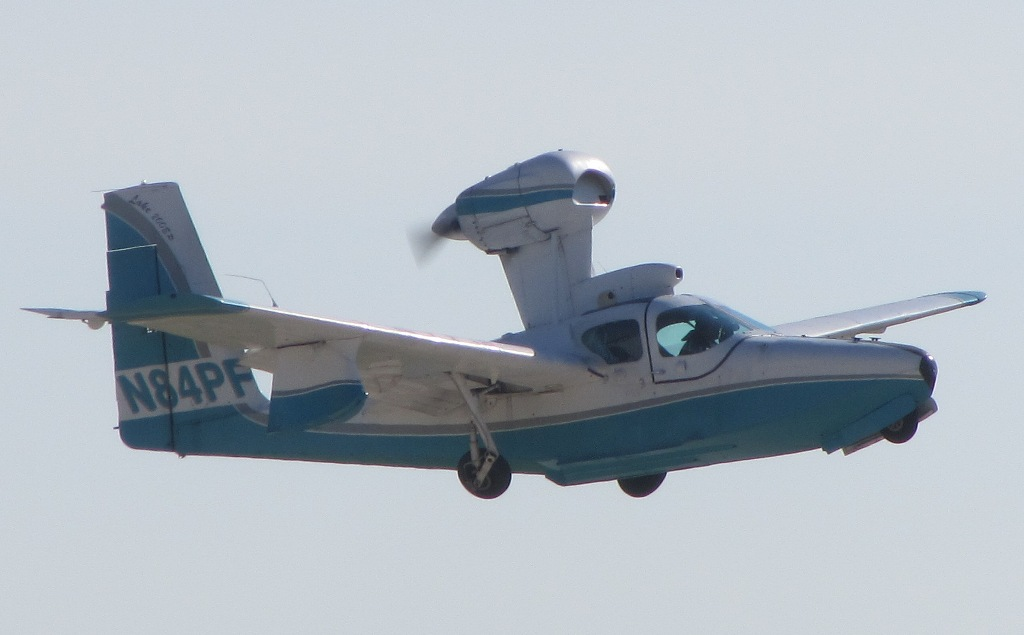
LA-4-200 EP

LA-4 Amphibian
Production version with a Lycoming O-360 A1A 180 hp (134 kW), type certified 26 July 1960. This differed from the Colonial C-2 in having four foot greater span, revised nose, doors, higher gross weight and reinforcement of the wing and wing-to-fuselage carry-through structure.
LA-4A
Shorter bow from the Colonial C-2, only two built. Type certified 1 June 1960.
LA-4P
LA-4 prototype, one only built. Type certified 21 June 1960.
LA-4S Seaplane
Version without wheeled landing gear, produced 1969-72 under STC SA781EA approved 8 July 1969 and amended 28 November 1969, issued to Revo, Inc.
LA-4T
Turbocharged version with 180 hp (134 kW) Lycoming O-360 A1D engine and Rayjay turbocharger. Not produced.
LA-4-200 Buccaneer
Lycoming IO-360 A1B 200 hp (149 kW)
LA-4-200EP "Lake EP"
Lycoming IO-360 A1B6 200 hp (149 kW) Standard fuel floats

== Specifications (LA-4-200 Buccaneer) ==
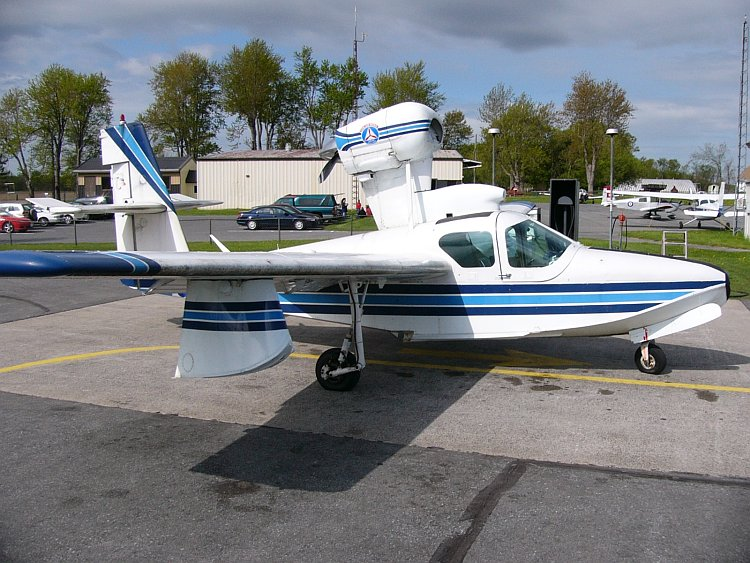
Lake LA-4-200 Buccaneer

Data from LA4-200 Airplane Flight Manual. Consolidated Aeronautics, Inc. pp. 4–5.

General characteristics

- Crew: one
- Capacity: three passengers
- Length: 24 ft 11 in (7.59 m)
- Wingspan: 38 ft 0 in (11.58 m)
- Height: 9 ft 4 in (2.84 m)
- Wing area: 170 sq ft (16 m^{2})
- Empty weight: 1,555 lb (705 kg)
- Gross weight: 2,690 lb (1,220 kg)
- Powerplant: 1 × Avco Lycoming IO-360-A1B piston engine , 200 hp (150 kW)

Performance

- Stall speed: 45 mph (72 km/h, 39 kn)
- Never exceed speed: 154 mph (248 km/h, 134 kn)
- Range: 825 mi (1,328 km, 717 nmi)
- Service ceiling: 14,700 ft (4,500 m)

== See also ==
Related development

- Colonial Skimmer
- Lake Renegade

Related lists

- List of seaplanes and flying boats
