= Savoia-Marchetti S.74 =

S.74
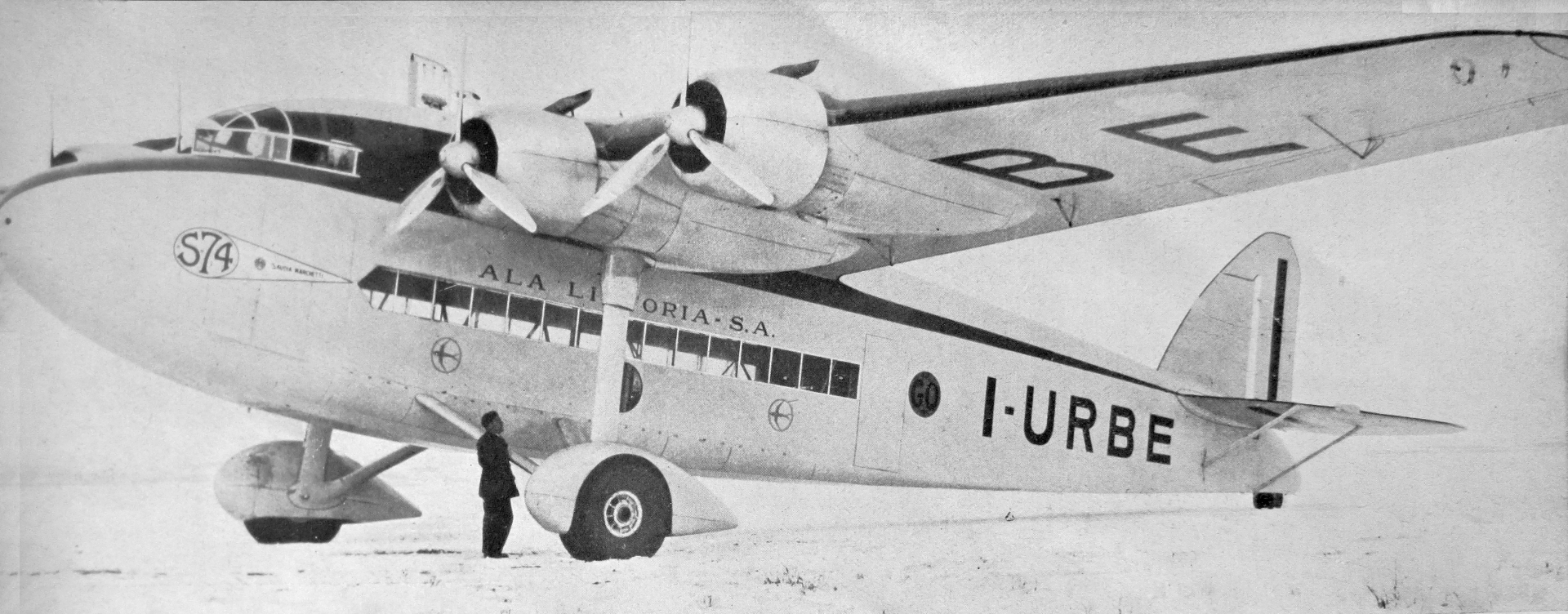

General information
- Type: Airliner then military transport aircraft
- National origin: Italy
- Manufacturer: Savoia-Marchetti
- Designer: Alessandro Marchetti
- Primary users: LATI Regia Aeronautica
- Number built: 3

History
- Introduction date: 1935
- First flight: 16 Nov 1934
- Retired: 1943
- Developed from: Savoia-Marchetti S.72

The Savoia-Marchetti S.74 was a four-engine airliner developed by Savoia-Marchetti for Ala Littoria.

== Design and development ==
The prototype first flew on 16 November 1934. Only three were ever built.

== Operational history ==
The aircraft were used in passenger service. On 22 December 1937, one broke the speed record over 1,000 kilometres (620 mi), at 322.089 km/h (200.137 mph). When Italy entered World War II in 1940, they were put into service as military transport aircraft for the Regia Aeronautica. None of the three survived the war.

== Operators ==
=== Civil operators ===
Kingdom of Italy

- LATI

=== Military operators ===
Kingdom of Italy

- Regia Aeronautica

== Specifications (S.74) ==
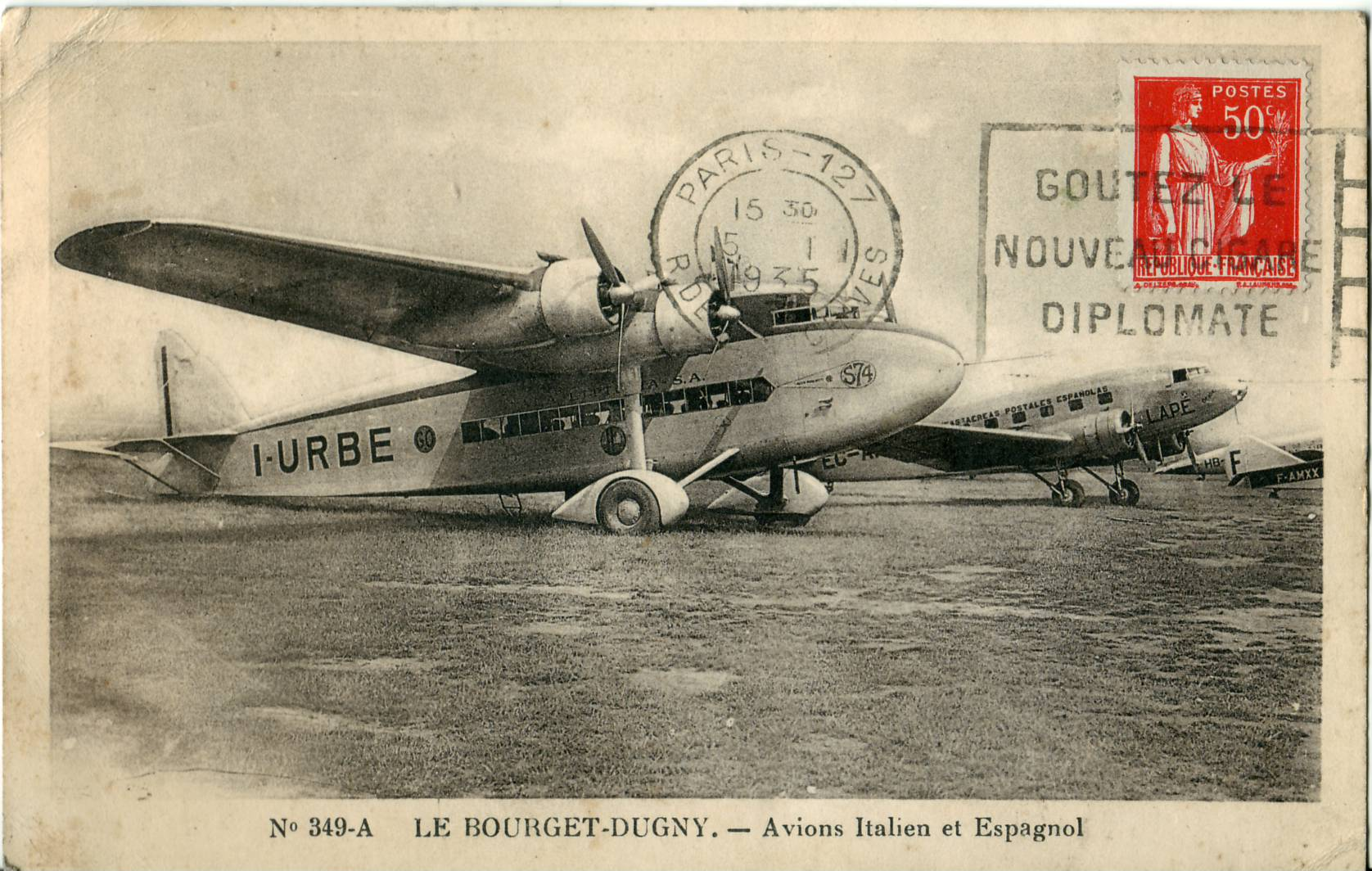
Paris-Le Bourget Airport in 1935. I-URBE (in the foreground) is an S.74; the other aircraft is a Douglas DC-2 airliner operated by the Spanish airline LAPE (Lineas Aéreas Postales Españolas).

Data from World Encyclopedia of Civil Aircraft, Italian Civil and Military Aircraft 1930–1945

General characteristics

- Crew: 4
- Capacity: 24 passengers + 363 kg (800 lb) baggage + 726 kg (1,600 lb) freight
- Length: 19.49 m (63 ft 11 1/2 in)
- Wingspan: 30.00 m (98 ft 5 in)
- Height: 5.50 m (18 ft 0 1/2 in)
- Wing area: 119.96 m^{2} (1,291.2 sq ft)
- Empty weight: 7,784 kg (17,160 lb)
- Gross weight: 14,000 kg (30,865 lb)
- Powerplant: 4 × Piaggio Stella P.X R.C. 9-cylinder air-cooled radial piston engines, 520 kW (700 hp) each for take-off
- Propellers: 3-bladed variable-pitch metal propellers

Performance

- Maximum speed: 330 km/h (210 mph, 180 kn)

285 km/h (177 mph; 154 kn) on three engines

- Cruise speed: 300 km/h (190 mph, 160 kn)
- Range: 1,000 km (620 mi, 540 nmi)
- Service ceiling: 7,000 m (22,960 ft)
- Time to altitude: 3,000 m (9,840 ft) in 8 minutes 55 seconds

5,000 m (16,400 ft) in 19 minutes 43 seconds

== See also ==
Aircraft of comparable role, configuration, and era

- De Havilland Albatross
- Focke-Wulf Fw 200
