= Savoia-Marchetti SM.95 =

Italian four-engine passenger and transport aircraft, 1943

SM.95
- SM.95 NC.41001 with Regia Aeronautica insignia

General information
- Type: Civil airliner / military transport
- Manufacturer: Savoia-Marchetti
- Primary user: Regia Aeronautica
- Number built: 20

History
- Manufactured: 1942–1949
- First flight: 8 May 1943
- Developed from: Savoia-Marchetti SM.75

The Savoia-Marchetti SM.95 was an Italian four-engine, mid-range transport aircraft, which first flew in 1943. It was the successor of the Savoia-Marchetti SM.75.

== Design and development ==
The SM.95 was announced in 1937, when the future was seen in the 4-engined aircraft. Until that time Italy had mainly used 3-engined aircraft. The SM.95, designed by Alessandro Marchetti, first flew on 8 May 1943. Originally named SM.76 it was fitted with four 750 hp A.R. 126 RC.34. In 1939 the project was renamed SM.95C (C for Civil), with the more powerful Alfa Romeo RC.18 (860 hp) engine.

With the start of World War II, this project was stopped until December 1941, when L.A.T.I. called for a 4-engined useful for South American routes. It had, nevertheless, inferior performances compared to Piaggio P.108C and CANT Z.511A, both metallic and more powerful. But the new SM.95 had lower costs and a swifter development.

The aircraft was similar to other contemporary airliners, but the construction was mixed. Welded steel was used for the fuselage structure, with light alloy covering fitted to the nose, underside and rear fuselage, and fabric covering for the fuselage sides and roof. The three-spar wing was also of wooden construction, with plywood skinning. The engines drove three-bladed metal constant speed propellers.

The two pilots sat side by side in an enclosed cockpit, while behind them sat the flight engineer (on the left) and radio operator (on the right). Behind the cockpit, there was normally seating for 20–30 passengers, with up to 38 being able to be carried over short ranges.

There was an initial need for a bomber version, SM.95B, with enhanced engines and a weapon set. Nevertheless, the first to fly was the SM.95C, on 3 August 1943, at Vergiate, with Guglielmo Algarotti flying.

== Operational history ==
Italy's armistice with the Allies in September 1943 stopped the program, and the only two aircraft built at the time were requisitioned by the Germans and sent to Germany, where they flew with the Luftwaffe and were subsequently lost.

On 28 July 1945, a third example flew, used with a fourth (still unfinished at the end of the war) with the Aeronautica Militare. One was taken by the RAF. The service with A.M. started after April 1946. Alitalia bought six examples, in service from 1947. LATI bought three examples in 1949. Lastly, four SM.95s were bought by SAIDE. They were used on the Cairo-Rome-Paris route. The only military customer was AMI, which had five of them.

SM.95C was a development model. The first were produced with AR.128 RC.18, the third with A.R. 131 RC.14/50, the next examples had Bristol Pegasus 48 (1,005 hp), and LATI used even more powerful Twin Wasp R-1830 (1,217 hp). A final development, the SM.95S with a metal structure, was planned but not built.

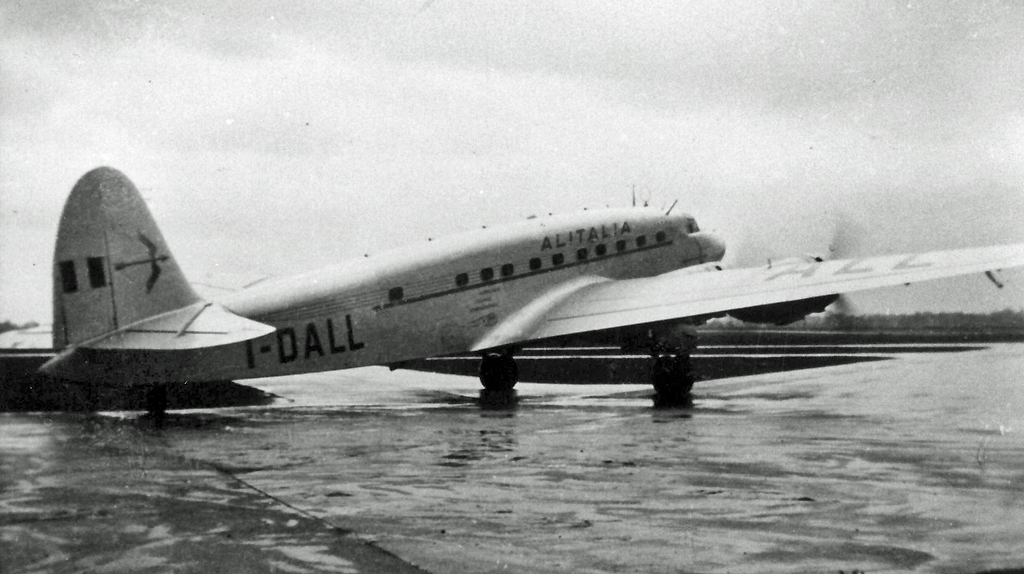
Savoia-Marchetti SM.95 I-DALL of Alitalia named "Marco Polo" at Manchester Ringway Airport in April 1948 when operating a scheduled service via London to Rome

The last SM.95 was completed on 18 November 1949, the last of twenty officially built. They had an unexceptional performance, even with PW engines, and had no pressurization at all, therefore they could not fly very high. The mixed construction did not last too long: the last flight was on 28 September 1954 (1950 with Alitalia).

On January 27, 1951, lightning struck the Alitalia Savoia-Marchetti SM.95B Ugolino Vivaldi (registration I-DALO) - named after the Italian navigator and explorer Ugolino Vivaldi - during a flight from Paris-Le Bourget Airport in Paris, France, to Roma-Ciampino Airport in Rome, Italy. The aircraft caught fire and crashed north of Civitavecchia, Italy, killing 14 of the 17 people on board.

=== Operation "S" ===
The interest for a military use was confirmed with a very daring mission: the bombing of New York. In July 1939, the S.M.75 obtained a record of 12,935 km (8,034 mi), there were several long-range missions both with S.M.82 and the S.M.75, while for S operation it was considered the 4-engined CANT Z.511, an all-metal floatplane. It had, however, some shortcomings: basically it needed to be refuelled by a submarine in the middle of the ocean. Although it was able to operate in adverse sea conditions (up to force-5 gales), this was not a very good idea, especially in the last year of war. It was proposed that a long-range version of this aircraft, the SM.95 GA (with a range of over 11,000 km/6,840 mi) could be used to mount a bombing raid on New York City launched from Western France, but the presence of many Italian-Americans in the city meant that Benito Mussolini would only authorize the dropping of propaganda pamphlets. It was reported that the fuel load was raised to 23,800 kg, for a total of 39,3 tons. The mission, with a 500 kg (1,100 lb) load, was still in preparation when Italy signed the Armistice in September 1943.

== Operators ==
=== Civil operators ===
Kingdom of Italy

- LATI (Linee Aeree Transcontinentali Italiane)

Italy – Postwar

- Alitalia

Egypt – Postwar

- SAIDE

=== Military operators ===
Kingdom of Italy

- Regia Aeronautica

Italy – Postwar

- Italian Air Force operated 5 Savoia-Marchetti SM.95 (MM: 61635, 61811, 61812, 61813, 61814) built in the postwar period and retired in 1953

Germany

- Luftwaffe operated captured aircraft

== Specifications (SM.95) ==
Data from World Encyclopedia of Civil Aircraft, Post War Propliners, Part 3: S.M.95.

General characteristics

- Crew: 4–5
- Capacity: 20–38 passengers
- Length: 24.77 m (81 ft 3 in)
- Wingspan: 34.28 m (112 ft 6 in)
- Height: 5.25 m (17 ft 3 in)
- Wing area: 128.3 m^{2} (1,381 sq ft)
- Empty weight: 13,310 kg (29,344 lb)
- Gross weight: 21,655 kg (47,741 lb)
- Powerplant: 4 × Alfa Romeo 128 R.C.18 9-cylinder air-cooled radial piston engines, 634 kW (850 hp) each
- Propellers: 3-bladed constant-speed propellers

Performance

- Maximum speed: 361 km/h (224 mph, 195 kn)
- Cruise speed: 315 km/h (196 mph, 170 kn)
- Range: 2,000 km (1,200 mi, 1,100 nmi)
- Service ceiling: 6,350 m (20,830 ft)

== See also ==
Related lists

- List of Regia Aeronautica aircraft used in World War II

== Bibliography ==
- Angelucci, Enzi. World Encyclopedia of Civil Aircraft. London: Willow Books, 1984. ISBN 0-00-218148-7.
- Garello, Giancarlo (June 1998). "Objectif: New York! Quand d'Italie révait de bombarder les Etats-Unis" [Objective New York: When Italy Dreamed of Bombing the United States]. Avions: Toute l'aéronautique et son histoire (in French) (63): 6–13. ISSN 1243-8650.
- Stroud, John. "Post War Propliners, Part 3: S.M.95." Aeroplane Monthly, August 1992, Vol. 20, No 8, Issue No 232, pp. 64–68. London: IPC. ISSN 0143-7240.
