= Savoia-Marchetti SM.75 Marsupiale =

Italian three-engine passenger and transport aircraft, 1937

SM.75
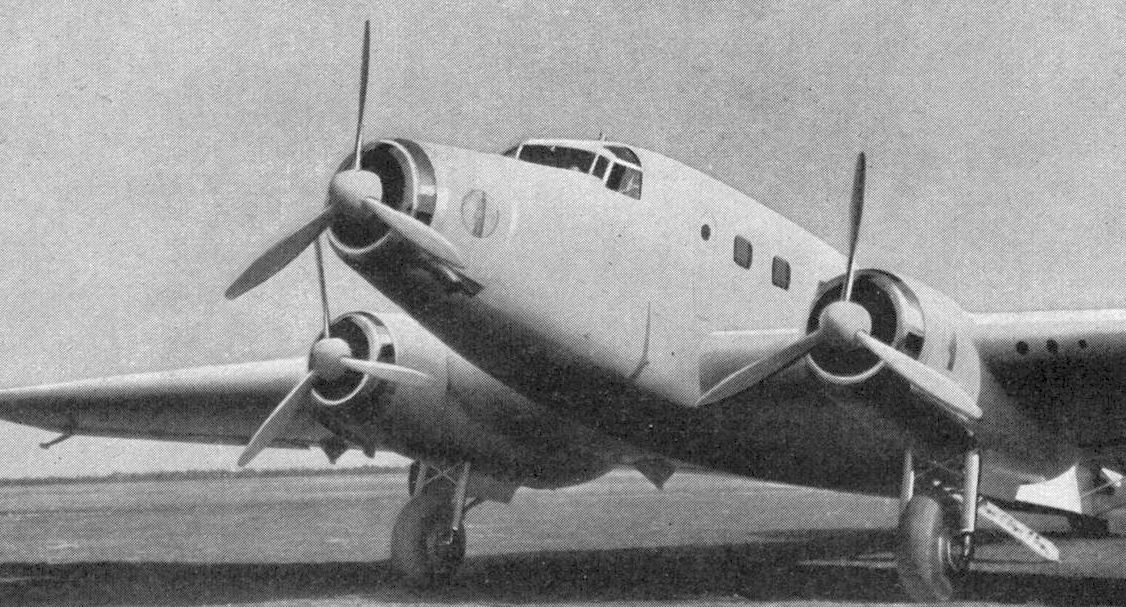

General information
- Type: Civil airliner & military transport
- Manufacturer: Savoia-Marchetti
- Designer: Alessandro Marchetti (1884–1966)
- Primary users: Italy Hungary
- Number built: 90

History
- Introduction date: 1938
- First flight: 1937
- Retired: 1949
- Variant: Savoia-Marchetti SM.82

The Savoia-Marchetti SM.75 Marsupiale (Italian: marsupial) was an Italian passenger and military transport aircraft of the 1930s and 1940s. It was a low-wing, trimotor monoplane of mixed metal and wood construction with a retractable tailwheel undercarriage. It was the last of a line of transport aeroplanes that Alessandro Marchetti began designing in the early 1930s. The SM.75 was fast, robust, capable of long-range flight and could carry up to 24 passengers for 1,000 miles.

== Development ==
=== SM.75 and SM.75bis ===
Savoia-Marchetti SM.75

The SM.75 was designed in response to an enquiry from the Italian airline Ala Littoria, which was seeking a modern, middle-to-long-range airliner and cargo aircraft as a replacement for its Savoia-Marchetti S.73 aircraft. Savoia-Marchetti chief designer Alessandro Marchetti (1884–1966) retained the general configuration of the S.73 but introduced retractable main landing gear to reduce aerodynamic drag. The SM.75s airframe consisted of a steel-tube frame with fabric and plywood covering, and its control surfaces were plywood-covered. The SM.75 had a four-man crew, and its cabin was built to accommodate up to 25 passengers. Its short take-off run of 337 metres (1,105 feet) and shorter landing distance of 280 m (920 ft) meant that it could operate from short runways on secondary airfields.

The SM.75 was powered by three 559 kW (750 hp) Alfa Romeo 126 RC.34 radial engines. Eleven aircraft fitted with three 641 kW (860 hp) Alfa Romeo 126 RC.18 14-cylinder engines were designated SM.75bis.

The Regia Aeronautica (Italian Royal Air Force) was interested in the SM.75, resulting in the development of a militarized version. This had much smaller cabin windows and was reinforced for a dorsal gun turret, as well as being equipped with a retractable bomb aimer's cupola, and a bomb bay. It was powered by three Alfa Romeo 128 RC.21 engines and had a greater cargo capacity than the SM.75, and entered military service as the Savoia-Marchetti SM.82.

=== SM.76 ===
The Italian airline LATI received its first SM.75 in 1939. The aircraft was redesignated as the SM.76 in 1940.

=== SM.87 ===
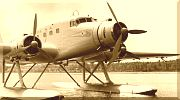
Savoia-Marchetti SM.87 float plane.

In 1939, a floatplane version of the SM.75 was built as the SM.87, powered by three 746 kW (1,000 hp) Fiat A.80 engines. It could reach a speed of 365 km/h (227 mph), had a ceiling of 6,250 m (20,510 ft), and a range of 2,200 km (1,400 mi). With a crew of four, it could accommodate 24 passengers. Four were built.

=== SM.90 ===
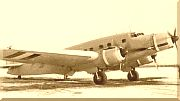
Savoia-Marchetti SM.90.

The SM.90 was a version of the SM.75 fitted with more powerful 1,044 kW (1,400 hp) Alfa Romeo 135 R.C.32 engines. It had a longer fuselage than the SM.75. Only one was built.

=== SM.75GA ===
The SM.75 GA (for Grande Autonomia, meaning "Long Range") was a modification of the SM.75 powered by three 641 kW (860 hp) Alfa Romeo 128 engines and fitted with a powerful radio and auxiliary fuel tanks to boost the aircraft's range to 7,000 km (4,300 mi) with a 1,100 kg (2,400 lb) load. With a four- or five-man crew and a 200 kg (440 lb) load, the SM.75 GA had a range of 8,005 km (4,974 mi) at 298 km/h (185 mph) while flying at altitudes between 3,500 and 5,000 m (11,500 and 16,400 ft).

== Operational history ==
=== Italian commercial service ===
The SM.75 first flew in November 1937 from Novara, in Piedmont. It entered commercial service with Ala Littoria in 1938 and with LATI in 1939, and was employed on services both within Europe and to South America, as well as on the Rome-Addis Ababa route established after the Italian invasion of Abyssinia (Ethiopia) following the Second Italo-Abyssinian War. The SM.75 proved capable of carrying a crew of four and 17 passengers and their baggage a distance of 1,721 km (1,069 mi) at 362 km (225 mi) per hour at 4,000 m (13,000 ft), and it established a number of world records for speed-over-distance-with-payload and closed-circuit distance. One modified SM.75 set a closed-circuit endurance record of 12,936 km (8,038 mi) on August 1, 1939, beating the then standing British record of 11,526 km (7,162 mi) set with a Vickers Wellesley late in 1938.

After Italy entered World War II on 10 June 1940, civil SM.75s continued to perform supply operations to Italian overseas territories, which dwindled as the war progressed. They also continued to operate to South America until December 1941, when Italy declared war on the United States.

=== Italian military service ===
After Italy entered World War II in June 1940, the Regia Aeronautica needed aircraft to maintain contact with Italian East Africa, which was surrounded by British-controlled territories. SM.75s were militarized with the installation of a 12.7 mm (0.50 in) Breda-SAFAT machine gun mounted in a Caproni-Lanciani gun turret along with a fifth crew member for it, and new SM.75s were modified to carry up to 24 troops over long distances.

==== Special missions ====
There were several notable missions flown mainly for propaganda purposes.

===== Leaflet mission to Asmara =====
In January 1942, the commander-in-chief of the Regia Aeronautica, General Rino Corso Fougier, began planning a Rome-to-Tokyo flight. He consulted with pilots with recent experience in long-range flights, and chose the SM.75, being better suited than either the SM.82 or the Savoia-Marchetti SM.83 because of its superior endurance. An SM.75 was selected for the flight and was modified into the first long-range SM.75 GA.

The first mission of the SM.75 GA was to drop propaganda leaflets saying "Italian colonists, Rome is not forgetting you. We shall come back!" over Italian East Africa, which had been lost to the British between 1940 and 1941.

The five-man crew left Rome at 17:30 hours on 7 May 1942, on their initial 2,700 km (1,700 mi) leg. Although they intended to fly at 3,000 m (9,800 ft), bad weather forced them up to 4,000 m (13,000 ft). After 10 hours and 20 minutes, they arrived over Asmara (Eritrea) and released leaflets, but instead of continuing on to Benghazi in Italian Libya as planned, they returned to Rome. The flight took 28 hours.

Two days after arriving in Rome, the SM.75GA suffered a simultaneous failure of all three engines during a 50 km (31 mi) ferry flight from Rome to Guidonia Montecelio. The aircraft was destroyed and the pilot lost a leg, while his crew escaped injury.

===== Rome-to-Tokyo flight =====
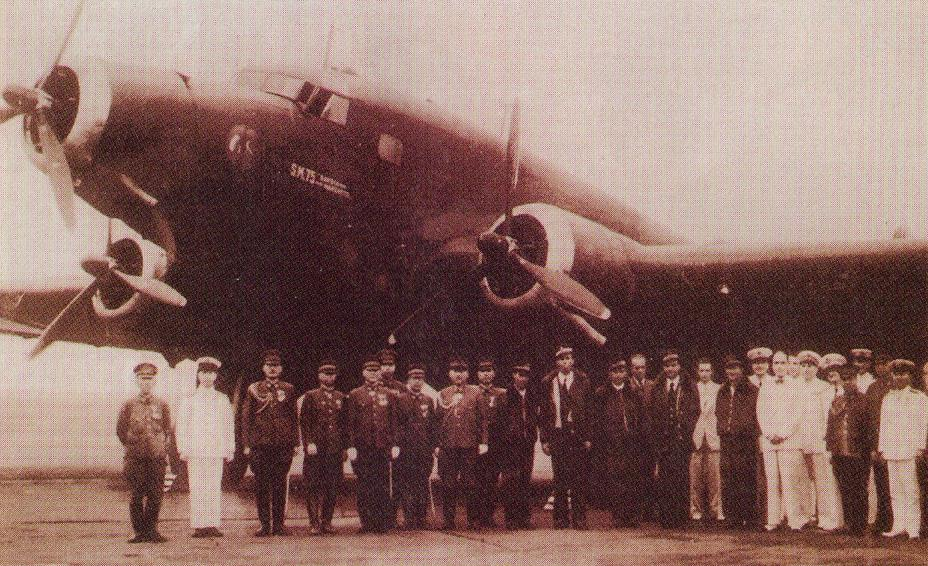
Japanese officials with SM.75 GA RT and crew during July 1942 visit.

After the first SM.75 GA was lost, a second SM.75 was modified to SM.75 GA standard for the Rome-to-Tokyo flight. Ready on 9 June 1942, it was designated the SM.75 GA RT (for "Rome-Tokyo").

Its pilot was in charge of the operation, which in addition to providing Italy with much-needed propaganda, would carry new communications codes for Japan and their Axis partners as the existing codes had been compromised by the British. The extreme distance, much of it over the Soviet Union, with which Italy was at war, made the flight especially challenging. Starting from Guidonia Montecelio on 29 June 1942, the SM.75 GA RT landed later that day at Zaporizhzhia, 2,030 km (1,260 mi) away in occupied Ukraine, the closest airfield to Japanese held territory. On 30 June 1942, the overloaded SM.75 GA RT made the difficult takeoff from the grassy 700 m (2,300 ft) runway at Zaporizhzhia, with 11,000 kg (24,000 lb)/10,340 L (2,270 imp gal; 2,730 US gal) of fuel. Its crew were under orders to burn the aircraft and its documents if forced down in enemy-held territory to avoid any incriminating documents becoming an embarrassment to the Japanese, who were not then at war with the Soviet Union.

Operating under radio silence, they evaded Soviet anti-aircraft fire, a Soviet fighter (probably a Yakovlev Yak-1), and bad weather as they flew over the north coast of the Aral Sea, skirted Lake Balkhash and the Tarbagatai Mountains before continuing over the Gobi. Maps of Soviet positions were inaccurate, and they had to climb to 5,000 m (16,000 ft) to avoid interception, consuming their oxygen supply faster than planned. A sandstorm was also encountered over Mongolia. With fuel running low, they landed at Pao Tow Chien in Japanese-occupied Inner Mongolia on 1 July 1942, 6,000 km (3,700 mi) east of Zaporizhzhia. The aircraft was repainted with Japanese roundels so that it would be safe in Japanese airspace, took an interpreter aboard, and then flew the final 2,700 km (1,700 mi) to Tokyo.

The SM.75 GA RT departed Tokyo on its return journey on 16 July 1942. Arriving at Pao Tow Chien, its Japanese markings were removed and replaced with Italian ones. It took off on 18 July 1942 from Pao Tow Chien, retraced its route, and, after 29 hours and 25 minutes in the air and having covered 6,350 kilometres (3,950 mi), it landed at Odessa in Ukraine before continuing on to Guidonia Montecelio. The Italians announced this achievement despite the Japanese government's reluctance for diplomatic reasons, which harmed relations between the two countries and the Italians made no attempt to repeat the flight.

===== Bombing mission to Abyssinia =====
Two SM.75 GA aircraft bombed American bombers at an airbase in Gura in Abyssinia, in 1943, the only bombing mission made by SM.75s. The two S.75 GAs were modified with "Jozza" bomb sights and were fitted to carry 1,200 kg (2,600 lb) of bombs and to reach the objective, over 3,000 kilometres (1,900 mi) away, 11,000 kg (24,000 lb) of fuel. Each aircraft had a take-off weight of 24,000 kg (53,000 lb). Experienced crews were selected and they started on 23 May 1943 from Rhodes, the easternmost Regia Aeronautica base at the time. The SM.75 GA's engines were optimized for economy rather than power making the take off difficult with the heavy load. Initially flying at low altitude, they climbed to 3,000 m (9,800 ft) but having burned too much fuel one diverted to bomb Port Sudan instead. The second aircraft continued alone, arriving over Gura airbase with was found to be heavily defended despite being well behind the front lines. All but one of the bombs were successfully dropped before returning to Rhodes the next morning after having covered 6,600 km (4,100 mi) in 24 hours and 15 minutes.

==== Italian Co-Belligerent Air Force ====
After Italy surrendered to the Allies in September 1943, some SM.75s entered service with the Italian Co-Belligerent Air Force, which fought on the Allied side for the remainder of World War II. The few SM.75s that survived the war and remained in service until 1949.

=== Hungary ===
Italy exported five SM.75 aircraft to Hungary for service with the Hungarian airline MALERT. After Hungary entered World War II, these aircraft were pressed into service with the Magyar Királyi Honvéd Légierő (MKHL), Hungarian Air Force.

==== 1941 crash incident ====
In the afternoon of 12 April 1941 during the short conflict between Hungary and Yugoslavia, four SM.75s with paratroopers, departed Veszprém, however, the leading aircraft crashed killing 23 Hungarians, including 19 paratroopers. It was the heaviest loss in the war against Yugoslavia.

=== Germany ===
After Italy surrendered to the Allies in September 1943, Germany seized some SM.75s which served with the Luftwaffe.

== Variants ==
SM.75
Civilian airliner and cargo aircraft; some later militarized for Regia Aeronatica use as cargo aircraft and troop transports
SM.75bis
Up-engined version of SM.75 civilian airliner
SM.75 GA
Long-range version of SM.75
SM.76
1940 redesignation of aircraft delivered to the Italian LATI airline
SM.87
Floatplane version of SM.75
SM.90
Re-engined version of SM.75 with longer fuselage

== Operators ==
=== Military operators ===
Germany

- Luftwaffe operated captured former Regia Aeronautica aircraft.

Hungary

- Royal Hungarian Air Force operated five former civilian MALERT airlines aircraft.

Kingdom of Italy

- Regia Aeronautica operated 32 former civilian aircraft.
- Italian Co-Belligerent Air Force

Italy

- Italian Air Force operated some Savoia-Marchetti SM.75 until 1949.

=== Civil operators ===
Kingdom of Italy

- Ala Littoria had 34 aircraft in operation by June 1940.

Hungary

- MALERT bought five aircraft in Italy.

== Specifications (SM.75 with Alfa Romeo engines) ==
Data from Italian Civil and Military aircraft 1930−1945

General characteristics

- Crew: 4 (+1 gunner in military use)
- Capacity: 24 passengers
- Length: 21.6 m (70 ft 10 in)
- Wingspan: 29.68 m (97 ft 5 in)
- Height: 5.1 m (16 ft 9 in)
- Wing area: 118.6 m^{2} (1,277 sq ft)
- Empty weight: 9,480 kg (20,900 lb)
- Gross weight: 14,470 kg (31,900 lb)
- Powerplant: 3 × Alfa Romeo 126 R.C.34 9-cylinder air-cooled radial piston engines, 560 kW (750 hp) each

Performance

- Maximum speed: 369 km/h (229 mph, 199 kn) at 3,000 m (9,800 ft)
- Cruise speed: 325 km/h (202 mph, 176 kn)
- Range: 2,279 km (1,416 mi, 1,230 nmi) maximum
- Service ceiling: 7,000 m (23,000 ft)
- Rate of climb: 3.7 m/s (730 ft/min)
- Time to altitude: 4,000 m (13,000 ft) in 17 min 42 sec

== Bibliography ==
- Angelucci, Enzo and Paolo Matricardi. World Aircraft: World War II, Volume I (Sampson Low Guides). Maidenhead, UK: Sampson Low, 1978. ISBN 0-562-00096-8.
- Lembo, Daniele, gli ultimi voli sull'impero, Aerei nella storia n.23, April–May 2002.
- Neulen, Hans Werner. In The Skies Of Europe: Air Forces Allied To The Luftwaffe 1939-1945. Ramsbury, Marlborough, UK: The Crowood Press, 2000. ISBN 1-86126-799-1.
- Pellegrino, Adalberto, Il raid segreto Roma-Tokyo, Storia militare n.45, June 1997.
- Rosselli, Alberto. "In the Summer of 1942, a Savoia-Marchetti Cargo Plane Made a Secret Flight to Japan." Aviation History. January 2004.
- Nakazawa, Akinori and Strippoli, Roberta, '1942-43: Italiani e Giapponesi in volo per rafforzare l'Asse Roma-Tokyo', Rivista Storica magazine Coop Giornalisti Storici, Rome, n.7/94, p. 48-53.
