= SIAI-Marchetti =

Defunct Italian aircraft manufacturing company (1915–83)

- Industry: Aerospace
- Founded: 1915
- Defunct: 1983
- Fate: Absorbed by Agusta in 1983; Absorbed by Aermacchi in 1997
- Headquarters: Sesto Calende, Italy
- Products: Transport aircraft Bombers; Experimental planes Air force trainers Seaplanes

SIAI-Marchetti was an Italian aircraft manufacturer primarily active during the interwar period.

== History ==
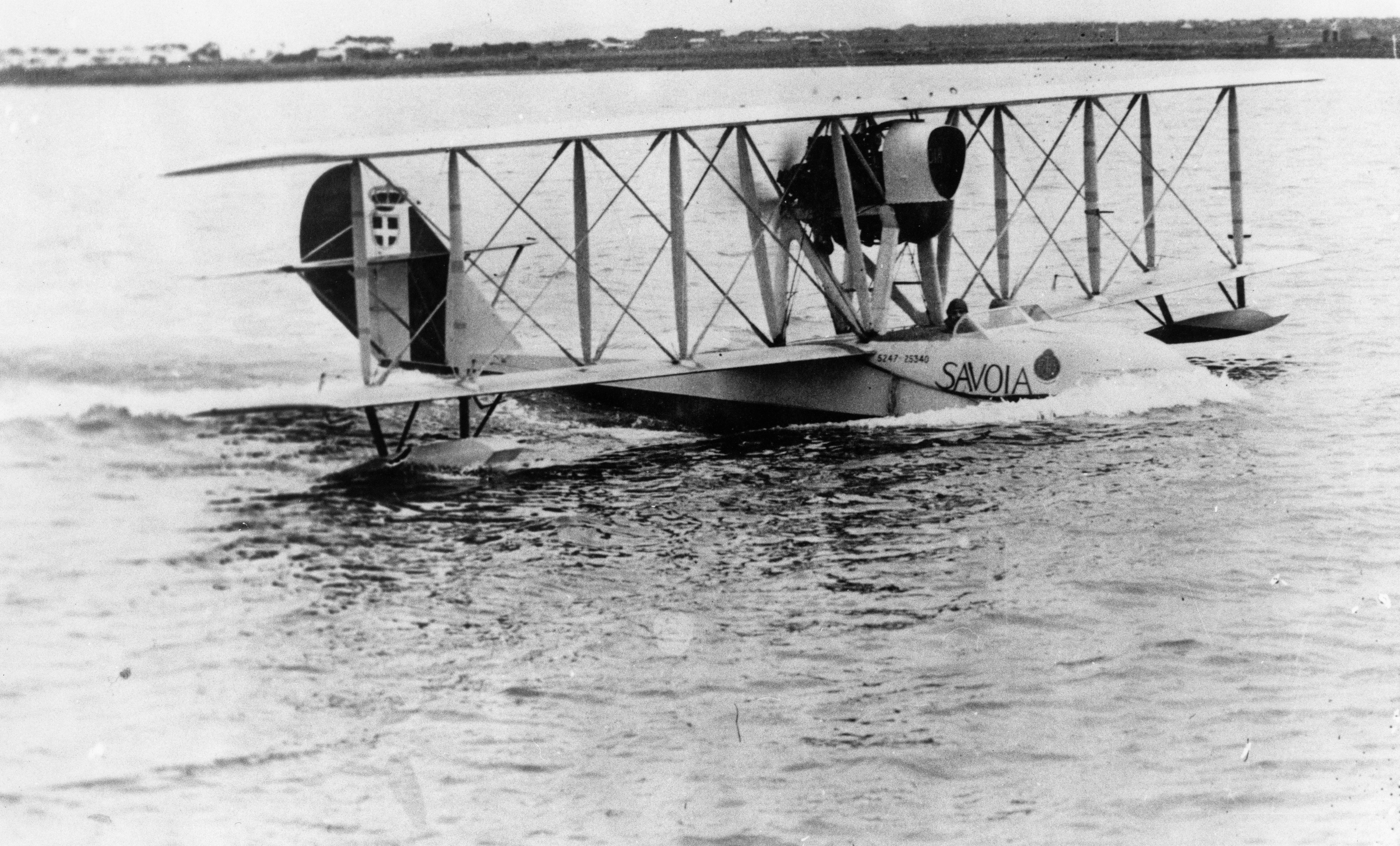
General De Pinedo's Savoia Marchetti seaplane landing on the Brisbane River in 1925

On 12 August 1915 Domenico Lorenzo Santoni and Luigi Capè founded the company SIAI (Società Idrovolanti Alta Italia – Seaplane Company of Upper Italy). As suggested by its name, the firm initially specialised in the manufacture of seaplanes, the vast majority of them intended for the Italian armed forces. Perhaps its most prominent early design was the SIAI S.16, a seaplane which had been configured to perform both aerial reconnaissance and bomber roles, but which also proved itself quite capable of long-distance flights. During 1925, Italian aviator Francesco de Pinedo of the Regia Aeronautica (Italian Royal Air Force) used an SIAI S.16ter he named Genariello for a record-setting flight from Rome to Australia and Tokyo to demonstrate his idea that seaplanes were superior to landplanes for long-distance flights. Having departed Rome on 21 April, de Pinedo and his mechanic, Ernesto Campanelli, visited dozens of countries, often stopping for multiple weeks at a time, particularly in Australia, before successfully arriving in Tokyo on 26 September 1925.

Shortly following the end of the First World War, the company was rebranded as Savoia following its acquisition of the Società Anonima Costruzioni Aeronautiche Savoia, an Italian aircraft company founded by Umberto Savoia in 1915. The name Marchetti was added to the company's name shortly following the recruitment of its long-serving chief designer, Alessandro Marchetti, during 1922.

Savoia-Marchetti gained prominence with the innovative S.55 flying boat. During 1926, the S.55P prototype successfully established 14 separate world records in categories including speed, altitude, and distance with a payload. Production models were produced for both civilian and military export customers; numerous S.55s were used during the Second World War and for a number of years beyond the conflict, despite the arrival of many newer types.

Savoia-Marchetti became relatively well known for its flying boats and seaplanes, aided by the numerous endurance and speed records that had been set by its products. The company earned the favour of numerous Italian officials, including Air Marshal Italo Balbo. Accordingly, the company was involved in the rapid development and prototyping of a wide portfolio of aircraft types during the 1930s. One such aircraft was the SM.75 trimotor monoplane transport aircraft, which was developed in response to an enquiry by the Italian airline Ala Littoria for a modern, middle- to long-range airliner and cargo aircraft; it featured an early implementation of retractable main landing gear and was capable of long-range missions, such as transporting up to 24 passengers over 1,000 miles. Another was the SM.81 Pipistrello, which became the first three-engine bomber/transport aircraft to be adopted by the Italian Regia Aeronautica; furthermore, it would be one of the most flexible, reliable, and important aircraft operated by the service through the Second World War, transitioning from a front-line bomber to various second-line duties towards the conflict's latter years.

The company became increasingly focused on the construction of military aircraft during the lead-up to, and throughout the majority of, World War II. In particular, the SM.79 Sparviero trimotor Italian medium bomber has been claimed by aviation authors Enzo Angelucci and Paolo Matricardi as being the best-known Italian aeroplane of the conflict. Performing its first flight on 28 September 1934, early examples of the type established 26 separate world records between 1937 and 1939, qualifying the SM.79 for some time as being the fastest medium bomber in the world. It was operated in various capacities during the war, initially focusing on its transport and medium-bomber duties. The SM.79 was developed into an effective torpedo bomber, in which capacity it achieved numerous successes against Allied shipping in the Mediterranean theater.

During 1943, the company was rebranded as SIAI-Marchetti. As the conflict turned in favour of the Allies, the company's manufacturing facilities were a particularly high-priority target for enemy bombers, leading to their virtual destruction by the final months of WWII. The firm continued to make efforts to design and produce new aircraft, such as the SM-93 dive bomber during 1944, but the economic consequences of the costly war made such ambitions unrealistic at best.

During the immediate postwar era, SIAI-Marchetti endeavoured to survive within the commercially inhospitable climate by diversifying into the manufacture of various items of railway equipment and trucks though efforts were not successful. The company was relatively insolvent, operating as such for roughly six years following the conflict's end before being compelled to declare bankruptcy in September 1951. During the firm's bankruptcy, all of its staff were dismissed, although more than half were re-employed by the liquidator to complete outstanding orders. During 1953, the company re-emerged from the bankruptcy process, and quickly began to focus its development efforts on the emerging market for helicopters.

Largely as a result of its investment into helicopters, SIAI-Marchetti was acquired by Italian helicopter specialist Agusta during 1983. Its remaining fixed-wing assets were subsequently absorbed by the aircraft manufacturing interest Aermacchi during 1997.

== Aircraft ==
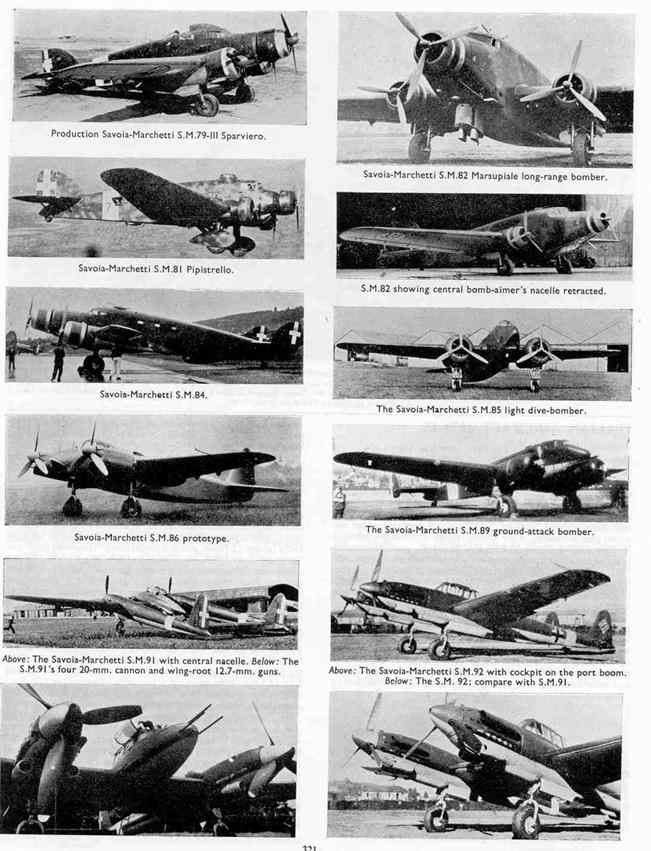
A selection of Savoia-Marchetti aircraft. Clockwise from top left: SM.79, SM.82, SM.85, SM.89, SM.92, SM.92, SM.91, SM.91, SM.86, SM.84 and SM.81.

- SIAI S.8 – two-seat reconnaissance flying boat (1917)
- SIAI S.9 – two-seat flying boat (1918)
- SIAI S.12 – two-seat reconnaissance flying boat (1918) and racing seaplane (as Savoia S.12, 1920)
- SIAI S.13 – two-seat reconnaissance flying boat (ca. 1919)
- SIAI S.16 – flying boat (1919)
- SIAI S.17 – racing flying boat (1920)
- SIAI S.19 – racing flying boat (1920)
- SIAI S.21 – racing flying boat (1921)
- SIAI S.22 – racing flying boat (1921)
- SIAI S.23 – biplane flying boat trainer (1922)
- SIAI S.50 – 1922 predesignation of Marchetti MVT fighter prototype (1919)
- SIAI S.51 – racing flying boat (1922)
- SIAI S.52 – fighter prototype (1924)
- Savoia-Marchetti S.55 – double-hulled flying boat (1924)
- Savoia-Marchetti S.56 – three-seat trainer/touring flying boat (1924)
- Savoia-Marchetti S.57 – reconnaissance flying boat (1923)
- SIAI S.58 – single-seat flying boat fighter prototype (1924)
- Savoia-Marchetti S.59 – reconnaissance/bomber flying boat (1925)
- Savoia-Marchetti S.60 – high-speed monoplane bomber project (1925)
- Savoia-Marchetti SM.62 – bomber/reconnaissance flying boat (1926)
- Savoia-Marchetti S.63 – flying boat airliner, single-hull version of S.55 (1927)
- Savoia-Marchetti S.64 – record breaking aircraft (1928)
- Savoia-Marchetti S.65 – twin engined push/pull racing seaplane (1929)
- Savoia-Marchetti S.66 – 22-passenger flying boat (1931)
- SIAI S.67 – single-seat flying boat fighter (1930)
- Savoia-Marchetti SM.70 – high-speed attack/bomber project (1930s)
- Savoia-Marchetti S.71 – eight-passenger light transport (1930)
- Savoia-Marchetti S.72 – bomber/transport (1934)
- Savoia-Marchetti S.73 – 18-passenger airliner/transport (1934)
- Savoia-Marchetti S.74 – airliner (1934)
- Savoia-Marchetti SM.75 – airliner/transport (1937)
- Savoia-Marchetti SM.76 (I) – projected four-engined version of SM.75 (1937); redesignated as SM.95 in 1939
- Savoia-Marchetti SM.76 (II) – SM.75 for LATI (1940)
- Savoia-Marchetti SM.77 – flying boat airliner (1937)
- Savoia-Marchetti SM.78 – bomber/reconnaissance flying boat (1932)
- Savoia-Marchetti SM.79 Sparviero – medium bomber (1934)
- Savoia-Marchetti SM.80 – touring amphibian (1933)
- Savoia-Marchetti SM.81 Pipistrello – bomber/transport (1935)
- Savoia-Marchetti SM.82 Marsupiale – heavy bomber/transport (1939)
- Savoia-Marchetti SM.83 – 10-passenger transport, civilianized version of SM.79 (1937)
- Savoia-Marchetti S.84 – prototype airliner developed from the S.73 (1936)
- Savoia-Marchetti SM.84 – medium bomber/torpedo bomber (1940)
- Savoia-Marchetti SM.85 – dive bomber (1936)
- Savoia-Marchetti SM.86 – dive bomber (1940)
- Savoia-Marchetti SM.87 – floatplane version of SM.75 (1940)
- Savoia-Marchetti SM.88 – twin-engined heavy fighter prototype (1939)
- Savoia-Marchetti SM.89 – ground attack (1941)
- Savoia-Marchetti SM.90 – prototype transport developed from the SM.75
- Savoia-Marchetti SM.91 – prototype twin-engine long-range fighter-bomber (1943)
- Savoia-Marchetti SM.92 – prototype twin-engine heavy fighter/bomber (1943)
- Savoia-Marchetti SM.93 – dive bomber (1943)
- Savoia-Marchetti SM.94
- Savoia-Marchetti SM.95 – transport/airliner (1943)
- Savoia-Marchetti SM.96 (I) – projected cargo version of SM.95 (1942)
- Savoia-Marchetti SM.96 (II) – projected single-seat monoplane fighter (1940s)
- Savoia-Marchetti SM.96 (III) – projected twin-tail assault transport (1940s)
- Savoia-Marchetti SM.97 – four engine airliner study (1943?)
- Savoia-Marchetti SM.99 – two or three engine transport study (1940s)
- SIAI-Marchetti SM.101 – single-engine transport aircraft (1947)
- SIAI-Marchetti SM.102 – twin-engine transport aircraft (1949)
- SIAI-Marchetti SM.103 – low-wing fighter-trainer project
- SIAI-Marchetti SM.104 – twin engine, twin boom transport project (1946)
- Savoia-Marchetti SM.105 Canguro – projected military/civil transport aircraft (1947)
- SIAI-Marchetti SM.106 – four engine high-wing transport project
- SIAI-Marchetti SM.107 – twin-engine low-wing transport project
- SIAI-Marchetti SM.10X – low-wing twin-engine jet fighter project (1949)
- SIAI-Marchetti SM.109 – four engine high-wing cargo transport project
- SIAI-Marchetti SM.110 Chimera II – four engine jet airliner project (1950)
- SIAI-Marchetti SM.112 – twin-turboprop airliner project (1953–1957)
- SIAI-Marchetti SM.115 – transport aircraft project (1950s)
- SIAI-Marchetti SM.122 – twin-turboprop airliner project (1953–1957)
- SIAI-Marchetti SM.132 – twin-engine low-wing jetliner project (1953–1954)
- SIAI-Marchetti SM.133 – twin-engine interceptor/fighter project
- SIAI-Marchetti SM.155 – twin-hull transatlantic flying boat project (1944)
- SIAI-Marchetti SM.166 – twin-hull flying boat project
- SIAI-Marchetti FN.333 Riviera – luxury touring amphibian flying boat (1952)
- SIAI-Marchetti S.201 – V/STOL transport project
- SIAI-Marchetti S.202 – two-seat trainer, project sold to FFA
- SIAI-Marchetti S.204 – twin turboprop light transport project (1960s)
- SIAI-Marchetti S.205 – four-seat liaison aircraft (1965)
- SIAI-Marchetti S.206 – projected 5–6 seat version of S.205 (1967?)
- SIAI-Marchetti S.208 – 5-seat version of S.205 (1967)
- SIAI-Marchetti S.210 – twin-engined cabin aircraft (1970)
- SIAI-Marchetti S.211 – two-seat jet trainer, light attack aircraft (1981)
- SIAI-Marchetti S.226 – 22 passenger business jet project (1980s)
- SIAI-Marchetti S.229 – swept-wing canard twin engine jet aircraft project, enlarged version of S.226 (1980s)
- SIAI Marchetti SF.260 – aerobatics plane and a military trainer (1964)
- SIAI-Marchetti SM.1019 – STOL liaison, observation aircraft (1969)
- SIAI Marchetti SF.600 Canguro – feederliner aircraft (1978)
- SIAI-Marchetti S.700 – general purpose amphibian aircraft (not built)
- FFA AS-202 Bravo – two/three-seat light civil aircraft (1969)

== See also ==
- Aermacchi
- Alenia Aermacchi
