= Savoia-Marchetti SM.89 =

SM.89
- SM.89 with Regia Aeronautica insignia

General information
- Type: Attack aircraft
- Manufacturer: Savoia-Marchetti
- Number built: 1

History
- Introduction date: 1942 (operational testing)
- First flight: 1941

The Savoia-Marchetti SM.89 was an attack aircraft designed by Alessandro Marchetti and built by Savoia-Marchetti. Only one example was built, the prototype (MM.543).

While the SM.89 is sometimes described as a "bomber", its primary armament was to be two 37 mm cannons 54 calibers long. As a result, it appears to have been more akin to contemporary, ground attack/maritime strike aircraft, such as the Bristol Beaufighter or Douglas A-26 Invader.

The prototype made its first flight in September 1941, at Vergiate, with test pilot Lieutenant G. Algarotti at the controls.

== Development ==
The SM.89 was intended to be a bomber/attack aircraft, something similar to Junkers Ju 88. The aircraft displayed some impressive features, but it was not a new project, rather an extrapolation from the earlier SM.84. The project utilized the wings, the aft fuselage and the mixed construction of the latter almost untouched, with a totally redesigned nose. The fuselage was made from a skeleton of steel tubes, covered with duralumin and wood back as far as the dorsal turret, the remainder of the fuselage being of wood and fabric construction. The wing was made of wood using three spars and a covering of compensate wood. The control surfaces comprised slats and flaps, and the ailerons, that were lowered partially with the flaps to increase lift.

The forward fuselage was the real difference between the SM.84 and SM.89. The forward fuselage housed only one pilot, after him there was a radio operator/gunner, and finally a gunner. Therefore, the aircraft had only half a crew, compared to the S.84. The fuselage was much more cramped than the S.84's, this was also due to the tandem position for all the crew, because a smaller crew area meant that less protection was needed.

The aircraft did not have a nose engine, unlike many contemporary Italian designs. The SM.89 was a two-engine aircraft so that the nose could be used to house weapons. The nose section was rounded, short, and inclined sharply to provide good visibility for attacks on surface targets. The weaponry was mainly based on the 37 mm (1.46 in) Breda anti-aircraft guns, used in the anti-tank and anti-ship roles. Three 12.7 mm (.50 in) Breda machine guns were also fitted in the nose. A further Breda machine gun was also fitted in the dorsal turret, and another was in a new model turret, a remote-controlled one, in the ventral position.

The aircraft could carry 700 bomblets or 1,400 kg (3,090 lb) of bombs or torpedoes under the belly. The aircraft could also be fitted with air brakes for dive bombing. The aircraft's speed also made it possible to use the aircraft as a bomber interceptor, however it was never fitted with a radar.

The Piaggio P.XI engines were too weak for the aircraft, so instead, two Piaggio P.XII RC.35 were used. These could develop 1,119 kW (1,500 hp) at take-off. These engines were in a more compact installation than those of the Piaggio P.108s and CANT Z.1018s. The aircraft could also carry 2,700 L (710 US gal) of fuel in self-sealing fuel tanks, which gave the aircraft an effective range of 720 km (450 mi).

The SM.89 had very heavy armour protection. The armour for the front and windscreen totalled 300 kg (660 lb), another 300 kg (660 lb) of armour protected the engines, and a further 80 kg (180 lb) was used in the aft armour. The aircraft was also possibly equipped with a CO² fire extinguisher system.

== Operational service ==
The aircraft flew in 1941, but it was not until September 1942 that it was sent to Guidonia for evaluation tests. The aircraft was taken into use in March 1943, seeing service in the anti-tank and other roles. The results were quite good, with its firepower second only to the P.108A.

The real problem with the S.89 was the power and the reliability of the engines. 2,237 kW (3,000 hp) was not enough for the 12,600 kg (27,780 lb) aircraft. It was planned to install Piaggio P.XV or Alfa Romeo 135 engines on the aircraft, but this never took place.

The pilots found the aircraft to be difficult to fly, nose heavy, not maneuverable enough, too slow, and difficult to land. During flight, the aircraft needed to have an elevated angle of attack so as not to lose altitude. The aircraft was later forgotten and sent to Foligno in July 1943. It was captured by the Germans after 8 September 1943 and vanished.

The aircraft could possibly have been more successful had it carried less weapons or armour. Both combined caused the weight to surpass 12,000 kg (26,460 lb). The attempt to cover both the attack and even interception requirements made this aircraft even less reliable and flyable than the already mediocre S.84.

== Specifications (S.89) ==
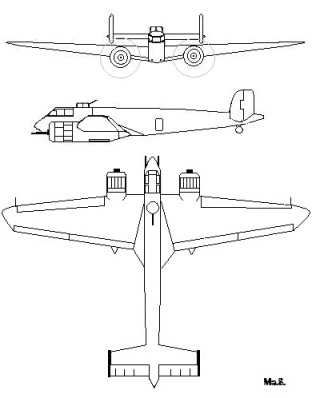

Data from Italian Civil and Military Aircraft 1930–1945

General characteristics

- Crew: 3
- Length: 16.85 m (55 ft 3 in)
- Wingspan: 21.04 m (69 ft 0 in)
- Height: 4.5 m (14 ft 9 in)
- Wing area: 61 m^{2} (660 sq ft)
- Empty weight: 8,800 kg (19,401 lb)
- Max takeoff weight: 12,634 kg (27,853 lb)
- Powerplant: 2 × Piaggio P.XII RC.35 18-cyl. air-cooled two-row radial piston engines, 1,119 kW (1,501 hp) each

Performance

- Maximum speed: 440 km/h (270 mph, 240 kn)
- Range: 1,600–1,650 km (990–1,030 mi, 860–890 nmi)
- Combat range: 720–780 km (450–480 mi, 390–420 nmi)
- Service ceiling: 6,700 m (22,000 ft)
- Rate of climb: 5.4 m/s (1,060 ft/min)

Armament

- Guns:
- 2x 37 mm (1.457 in) Breda 37/54 cannon

and

- 3x fixed forward firing 12.7 mm (0.500 in) Breda-SAFAT machine guns

and

- 2x 12.7 mm (0.500 in) machine guns in dorsal and ventral positions.

== Sources ==
- Lembo, Daniele, i distruttori della Regia, Aerei nella Storia n.46, pag. 9–11.
