= S84 =

S84 may refer to:

- S84 (New York City bus) serving Staten Island
- Savoia-Marchetti S.84, an Italian airliner
