= Savoia-Marchetti SM.93 =

Italian dive bomber (1943)

SM.93
- SM.93 with Luftwaffe insignia

General information
- Type: Dive bomber
- Manufacturer: Savoia-Marchetti
- Designer: Alessandro Marchetti
- Number built: 1

History
- First flight: 31 January 1944

The Savoia-Marchetti SM.93 was an Italian dive bomber designed and produced in Italy from 1943.

== Design ==
The SM.93 was an all-wood single-engined low-wing monoplane with retractable undercarriage. The fuselage had a monocoque structure, with a single fin and low-set tailplane. The crew of two were accommodated under a long greenhouse-style canopy, with the pilot lying in a prone position above the rear of the engine, a Daimler-Benz DB 605A liquid-cooled V12 engine, while the gunner/radio-operator sat facing rearwards on a conventional seat.

The two-spar wings were in three parts with the inner wings sharply tapered to the join, outboard of the landing gear attachments, and the outer wings moderately tapered to the rounded wingtips. The prone position for the pilot was intended to enable the pilot to resist the onset of g-induced loss of consciousness, but the position was uncomfortable for normal flight and severely limited the rearwards view of the pilot.

== Development ==
The SM.93 made its maiden flight on 31 January 1944, and up to 29 March 1944 the SM-93 had made 16 test-flights with speeds up to 900 kilometres per hour (560 mph) achieved in a dive, demonstrating the low drag and clean aerodynamics.

== Operational history ==
Flight testing was carried out under the aegis of the Luftwaffe and despite the good performance, the prone position was found to be unsatisfactory, being uncomfortable and restricting rearward vision. The programme was halted by the German control Commission that was running weapons production in the Repubblica Sociale Italiana - RSI after the 1943 armistice.

== Specifications (SM.93) ==
Data from Italian Civil and Military aircraft 1930-1945 Plane Facts: Unique dive bomber

General characteristics

- Crew: 2
- Length: 11 m (36 ft 1.8 in)
- Wingspan: 13.9 m (45 ft 7.2 in)
- Height: 3.8 m (12 ft 5.5 in)
- Wing area: 31.09 m^{2} (334.7 sq ft)
- Empty weight: 3,544 kg (7,814 lb)
- Gross weight: 5,500 kg (12,125 lb)
- Powerplant: 1 × Daimler-Benz DB 605A V-12 liquid-cooled inverted piston engine, 1,100 kW (1,475 hp)

Performance

- Maximum speed: 580 km/h (360 mph, 310 kn) at 4,500 m (14,800 ft)
  - 542 km/h (337 mph) at 7,000 m (23,000 ft) with bombload
  - 580 km/h (360 mph) at 7,000 m (23,000 ft) clean
- Cruise speed: 505 km/h (314 mph, 273 kn)
- Never exceed speed: 950 km/h (590 mph, 510 kn)
- Range: 1,600 km (994 mi, 864 nmi)
- Service ceiling: 10,000 m (32,800 ft)
- Time to altitude: 4,000 m (13,000 ft) in 5 min 10 sec
- Wing loading: 176.9 kg/m^{2} (36.2 lb/sq ft)
- Power/mass: 0.2 kW/kg (0.122 hp/lb)

Armament

- Guns:
- 1 × 20 mm MG 151/20 cannon (150 rounds) firing through the propeller hub
- 2 × 12.7 mm (.50 in) Breda-SAFAT machine guns (with 350 rpg) in the wings
- 1 × 12.7 mm (.50 in) Breda-SAFAT machine gun on a flexible mounting in the rear cockpit
- Bombs: Total 1,451.5 kg (3,200 lb)
  - 816.5 kg (1,800 lb)1800 lb. below the fuselage
  - 317.5 kg (700 lb)1400 lb. under each wing
