= SIAI S.21 =

Italian racing flying boat

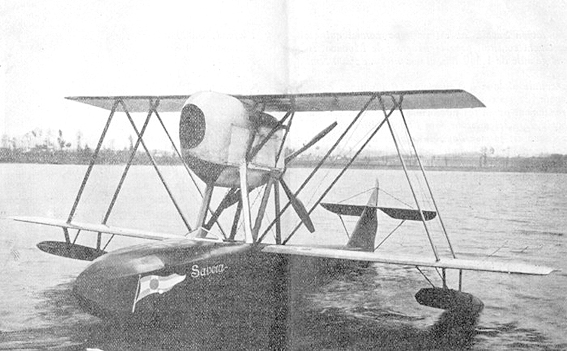

General information
- Type: Racing flying boat
- National origin: Italy
- Manufacturer: SIAI
- Primary user: Italy
- Number built: 1

History
- First flight: 1921

The SIAI S.21 was an Italian racing flying boat built by SIAI for the 1921 Schneider Trophy race.

== Design and development ==
The S.21 was a single-seat biplane flying boat with its upper wing being of shorter span that its lower wing. Its 224 kW (300 hp) Ansaldo San Giorgio 4E-14 engine was mounted on struts above its hull and below its upper wing and drove a four-bladed pusher propeller. Small stabilizer floats were mounted beneath the lower wing on each side.

== Operational history ==
During test flights, the S.21 proved extremely difficult to control, and the only pilot who had success with it was Guido Jannello, who had already made an impression at the 1918 Schneider Trophy, in a Savoia S.13. When Jannello fell ill at the time of the 1921 Schneider Trophy race and was unable to pilot it, the S.21 was withdrawn from the race.

== Popular culture ==
In the Japanese animated film Porco Rosso (1992), the main protagonist's plane is referred to as a Savoia S.21. Although patterned somewhat after the S.21, the plane in the film more closely resembles the Macchi M.33.

== Operators ==
Kingdom of Italy

== Specifications ==
Data from Aviation: SIAI racing seaplanes and Japanese Wikipedia SIAI S.21

General characteristics

- Crew: one
- Length: 7.62 m (25 ft 0 in)
- Wingspan: 7.69 m (24 ft 2.75 in)
- Powerplant: 1 × Ansaldo San Giorgio 4E-14 , 224 kW (300 hp)

Performance

- Maximum speed: 290 km/h (180 mph, 160 kn)

== See also ==
- Schneider Trophy

Related lists

- List of flying boats and floatplanes
