= SIAI S.17 =

General information
- Type: Racing flying boat
- National origin: Italy
- Manufacturer: SIAI
- Primary user: Italy
- Number built: 1

History
- First flight: 1920

The SIAI S.17 was an Italian racing flying boat built by SIAI for the 1920 Schneider Trophy race.

== Design and development ==
Although earlier SIAI aircraft had been employed as racers, the single-seat S.17 was SIAI's first specialized racing aircraft designed as such. Its 231 kW (310 hp) Ansaldo San Giorgio 4E-14 engine gave it a top speed of 290.9 km/h (157.1 kn; 180.8 mph).

== Operational history ==
The S.17 participated in the 1920 Schneider Trophy races at Monaco, but crashed during the final take-off and did not finish.

== Operators ==
Kingdom of Italy

== Specifications ==
Data from

General characteristics

- Crew: 1
- Length: 7.6 m (24 ft 11 in)
- Wingspan: 7.7 m (25 ft 3 in)
- Height: 2.7 m (8 ft 10 in)
- Powerplant: 1 × Ansaldo San Giorgio 4E-14 4-cyl, water-cooled in-line piston engine, 231 kW (310 hp)

Performance

- Maximum speed: 190 km/h (120 mph, 100 kn)
- Cruise speed: 170 km/h (110 mph, 92 kn)
- Range: 600 km (370 mi, 320 nmi)

== See also ==
- Schneider Trophy

Related lists

- List of flying boats and floatplanes
