= Savoia-Marchetti SM.77 =

1930s an Italian seaplane

SM.77

General information
- Type: Flying boat airliner
- National origin: Italy
- Manufacturer: Savoia-Marchetti
- Number built: 1

History
- First flight: 1937
- Developed from: Savoia-Marchetti S.66

The Savoia-Marchetti SM.77 was an Italian transport seaplane developed by Savoia-Marchetti in the 1930s. It represented the latest development of the "double hull" formula started with the Savoia-Marchetti S.55 and continued with the Savoia-Marchetti S.66.

It differed from the previous S.66 in having 3x 800 hp (600 kW) (take-off) Alfa Romeo 126 R.C.10 radial engines driving 3-bladed variable pitch propellers, in place of the 3x Fiat A.24R V-12s of the S.66. The wing resumed the one developed for S.M.79 and presented several improvements to hulls and empennage.
