= Savoia-Marchetti SM.83 =

1938–1945 Italian civil airliner

SM.83
- I-ANDE markings Ala Littoria's SM.83

General information
- Type: Airliner and transport aircraft
- National origin: Italy
- Manufacturer: Savoia-Marchetti
- Designer: Alessandro Marchetti
- Primary users: LATI Regia Aeronautica; SABENA
- Number built: 23

History
- Introduction date: 1938
- First flight: 19 Nov 1937
- Retired: 1945
- Developed from: Savoia-Marchetti SM.79

The Savoia-Marchetti SM.83 was an Italian civil airliner of the 1930s. It was a civilian version of the Savoia-Marchetti SM.79 bomber.

== Design and development ==
It was a monoplane, with retractable undercarriage, and a slim fuselage. Though the cabin was provided with heaters, oxygen provision and sound insulation it was large enough for the 4 crew and only four to 10 passengers. The construction was of mixed materials in the typical Savoia-Marchetti style of the time: steel tubes for the fuselage, wood for the wings, and the outer skin made up of wood, fabric or metal. The wings had slats. The powerplant was three AR.126 engines giving a total of about 2,300 hp.

The maximum range stated was 4,800 km (3,000 mi). The maximum speed was slightly better than the bomber 444 km/h (276 mph) at 4,000 m (13,000 ft) due to the absence of the gondola and hump machine gun positions.

First flying on 19 November 1937, it entered into production for LATI, SABENA and other companies, but it had less success compared to the more economic and capable 18 seater Savoia-Marchetti S.73 even if it had much improved performance. As a result, only 23 were built in two main series.

== Service ==
When war broke out, the Italian aircraft were impressed into the Regia Aeronautica, and used in transport units.

One S.83 was used near the end of the war to flee Italy. Spain had forbidden aircraft both military and civilian of the Axis powers from landing there so S.83 was painted with Croatian insignia and purportedly owned by a Croatian citizen. Carrying 5,000 litres of fuel (50% more than standard) and 14 men and women including the parents of Claretta Petacci, Benito Mussolini’s mistress), the aircraft took off at 4:30 on 23 April 1945 from Milan. It landed at Barcelona just three hours later. It was not until September that the crew and aircraft were repatriated.

== Operators ==
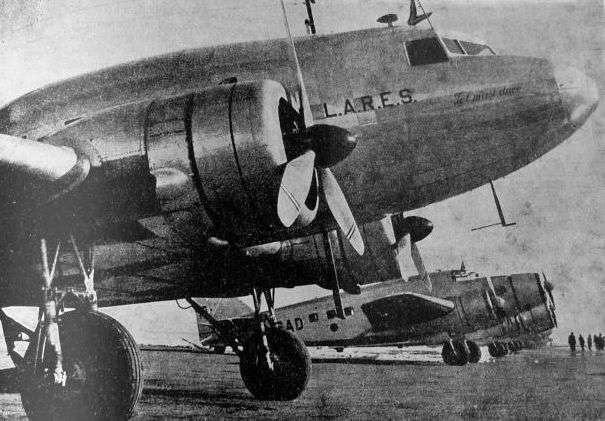
Savoia-Marchetti SM.83 and Douglas DC-3 aircraft used by LARES

=== Civil operators ===
Belgium

- SABENA - four aircraft (three delivered)

Italy

- Ala Littoria
- LATI

Romania

- LARES - three aircraft
- Prince Bibesco of Romania - one aircraft

=== Military operators ===
Belgium

- Belgian Air Force

Italy

- Regia Aeronautica

Romania

- Royal Romanian Air Force

== Specifications (S.83) ==
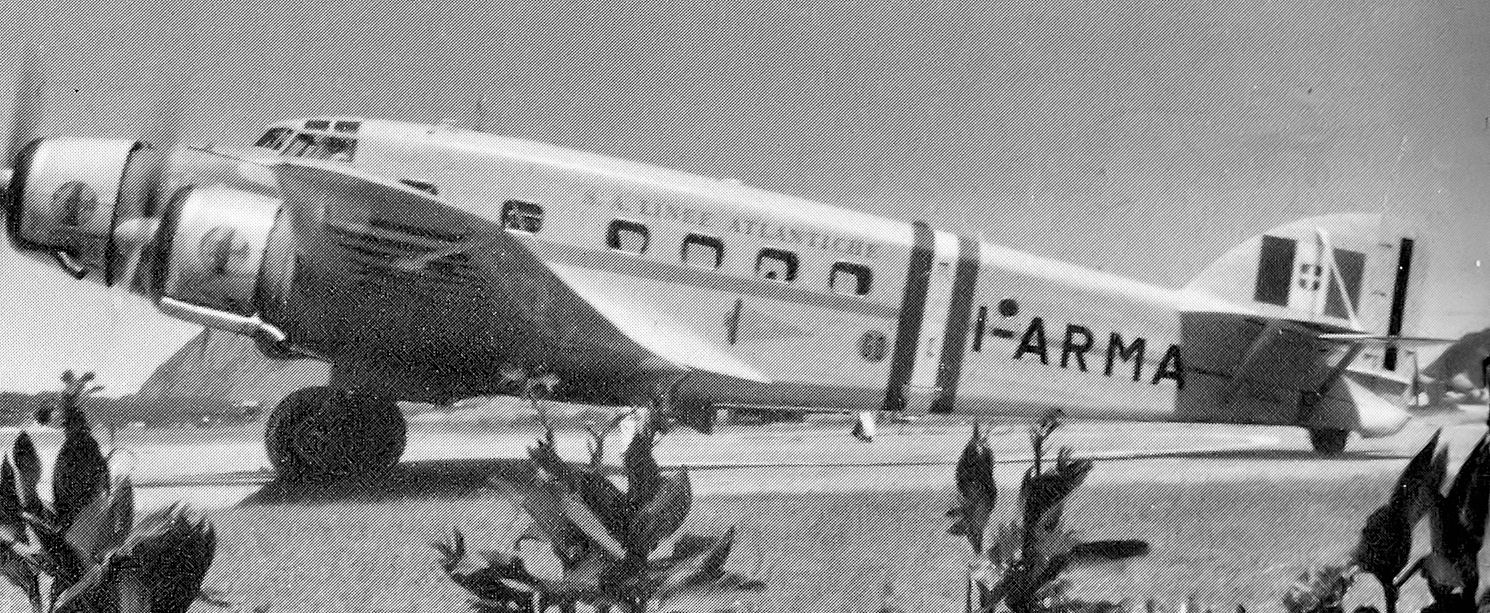

Data from Jane's All the World's Aircraft 1938 Italian Civil and Military aircraft 1930–1945

General characteristics

- Crew: 3 or 4
- Capacity: 10 passengers
- Length: 16.2 m (53 ft 2 in)
- Wingspan: 21.2 m (69 ft 7 in)
- Height: 4.1 m (13 ft 5 in)
- Wing area: 60 m^{2} (650 sq ft)
- Empty weight: 6,800 kg (14,991 lb)
- Gross weight: 10,300 kg (22,708 lb)
- Powerplant: 3 × Alfa Romeo 126 R.C.34 9-cyl air-cooled radial piston engines, 560 kW (750 hp) each

Performance

- Maximum speed: 444 km/h (276 mph, 240 kn) at 4,000 m (13,123 ft)
- Cruise speed: 400 km/h (250 mph, 220 kn) at 5,000 m (16,404 ft) with 70% power
  - 380 km/h (236 mph) at 5,000 m (16,404 ft) with 60% power
- Range: 1,500 km (930 mi, 810 nmi)
- Endurance: 4 hours
- Service ceiling: 8,400 m (27,600 ft) (5,500 m (18,045 ft) with one engine stopped)
- Time to altitude:
  - 3,000 m (9,843 ft) in 9 minutes
  - 4,000 m (13,123 ft) in 13 minutes 30 seconds
- Wing loading: 169 kg/m^{2} (35 lb/sq ft)
- Power/mass: 0.173 kW/kg (0.1 hp/lb)

== See also ==
Related lists

- List of aircraft of World War II
