= Savoia-Marchetti SM.84 =

Italian medium bomber

SM.84
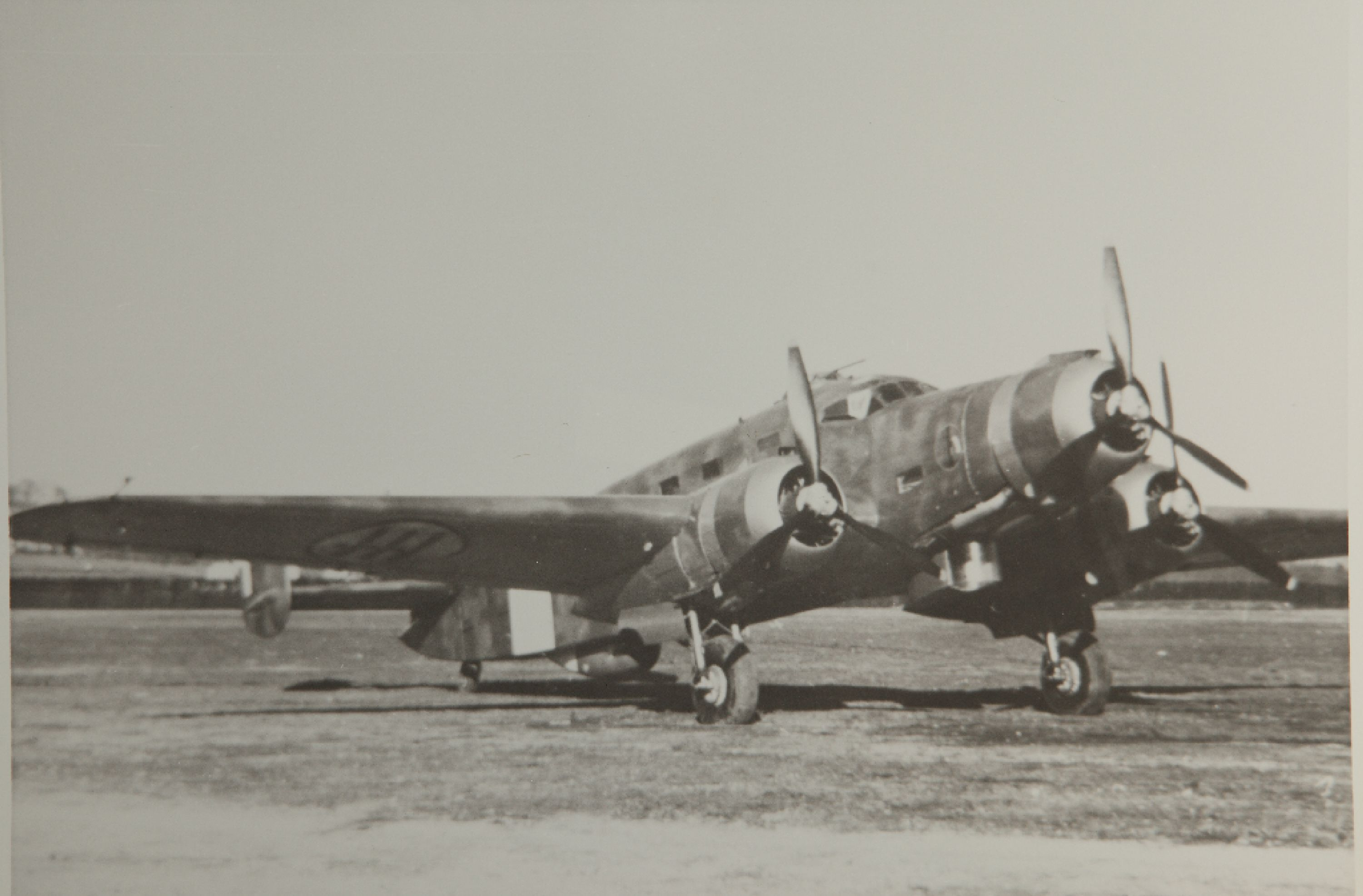

General information
- Type: Bomber/Torpedo-bomber
- Manufacturer: Savoia-Marchetti
- Primary user: Regia Aeronautica
- Number built: 329

History
- Introduction date: 1941
- First flight: 5 June 1940
- Retired: 1948
- Developed from: Savoia-Marchetti SM.79

The Savoia-Marchetti SM.84, not to be confused with the Savoia-Marchetti S.84 airliner prototype, was a bomber aircraft designed and produced by the Italian aircraft manufacturer Savoia-Marchetti. It was flown by the Regia Aeronautica during World War II.

The SM.84 was developed during the late 1930s as a replacement for the successful SM.79, with which it was derived and shared its wing design and three-engine configuration. On 5 June 1940, the first prototype performed its maiden flight, and quantity production commenced later that same year. It entered service with the Regia Aeronautica in 1941. Despite being procured as a replacement for the SM.79, the SM.84 never entirely replaced its predecessor and was retired from service prior to the SM.79.

== Development ==
Development of an aircraft to replace the SM.79 was launched in 1938. Savoia-Marchetti's design team opted to produce an improved development of the SM.79, leading to it sharing a similar wing with its predecessor, which was mated to a new fuselage, a twin tail and more powerful engines. An order was placed for two prototypes of Savoia-Marchetti's new aircraft, at first known as the SM.89 or the SM.79bis, on 21 September 1939. Production orders for 183 SM.84s were placed in December 1939. The first prototype made its maiden flight on 5 June 1940, just five days prior to Italy's entry into World War II.

It was hoped to replace the SM.79s in service, which were fast, but obsolescent, and yet to be adapted as torpedo bombers. The main improvement was the adoption of new and more powerful engines, giving a total output of 2,237 kW (3,000 hp). The aircraft was put into series production at the end of 1940.

== Design ==
Basically it was an enhanced SM.79, with more modern solutions and systems. It shared the basic design of a three-engine mixed construction monoplane as the SM.79. Wood was used for the wings, supported by three spars. Steel tubing was used as a skeleton for the fuselage, covered by metal (forward), fabric and wood. The new fuselage housed a crew of five to six, with the pilots sitting side-by-side. Behind them there were a radio-operator and flight engineer. There was a large canopy and eight windows in the fuselage.

The armour was much improved compared to the almost non-existent protection fitted to the SM.79. It was said there was a total of 700 kg (1,540 lb) fitted, but it is unclear if this also included the self-sealing fuel tanks, capable of withstanding up to 12.7 mm (.50 in) rounds. One noticeable difference was the twin tail, which gave a better field of fire to the dorsal gun, and helped to cope with the greater power and weight compared to the SM.79.

Armament was similar to the CANT Z.1007, rather than the SM.79. There was a dorsal Caproni-Lanciani Delta turret, with a 12.7 mm (.50 in) Scotti machine gun, and 350 rounds. Another Scotti was in the ventral gondola. Another two Scotti machine guns with six 120-round belts, were mounted in the waist positions either side of the fuselage. It was a theoretical improvement, though Scotti machine guns, even with a slightly higher rate of fire, were much less reliable than the Breda. Another disadvantage was the inability of the turret to fire directly forward, through the propeller's blades, so the aircraft had no defence from frontal attacks.

The bomb bay was in the middle of the fuselage. Horizontally mounted, the aircraft could carry two 500 kg (1,100 lb), three 250 kg (550 lb), 10 100 kg (220 lb), or 10 50 kg (110 lb) bombs. Outside the fuselage it was possible to mount two 500 kg (1,102 lb) or 800 kg (1,760 lb) bombs, or two torpedoes, or multiple smaller bombs. Generally, the aircraft carried only one torpedo or around 1,000 kg (2,200 lb) of bombs. The aiming apparatus was a Jozza U3, fitted in the bombardier's nacelle, just below the cockpit. It was retractable when not in use, to reduce drag.

An OMI camera was fitted in the fuselage, while in the tail section it was possible to mount one of three different cameras, like the AGR.90 or 91.

Three Piaggio P.XI RC.40 engines, giving 746 kW (1,000 hp) at 4,000 m (13,120 ft) were fitted. There were 16 self-sealing fuel tanks inside the wing and the fuselage, six for the central engine (1,070 L/283 US gal) and five for each wing engine (1,095 L/289 US gal). Total fuel load was 3,260 L (860 US gal), which was less, despite the more powerful engines, than previous Italian bombers. It was possible, however, to mount another three fuel tanks: two of 415 L (110 US gal) in the fuselage, and one of 2,500 L (661 US gal) in the bomb-bay.

With these engines, at full load the SM.84 was capable of:

- 400 km/h (250 mph) at 1,000 m (3,280 ft).
- 418 km/h (260 mph) at 2,000 m (6,560 ft).
- 437 km/h (272 mph) at 3,000 m (9,840 ft).
- 456 km/h (283 mph) at 4,000 m (13,120 ft).
- 467 km/h (290 mph) at 5,000 m (16,400 ft).
- 450 km/h (280 mph) at 6,000 m (19,690 ft).

Climb rates to:

- 1,000 m (3,280 ft) in 2 min 32 sec.
- 2,000 m (6,560 ft) in 5 min 25 sec.
- 3,000 m (9,840 ft) in 8 min 2 sec.
- 4,000 m (13,120 ft) in 10 min 54 sec.
- 5,000 m (16,400 ft) in 14 min 48 sec.
- 6,000 m (19,690 ft) in 19 min 18 sec.

The maximum practical ceiling was 8,200 m (26,900 ft). At 5,500 m (18,050 ft) and 397 km/h (247 mph), it had 5 hour 17 minutes endurance, and a range of 2,040 km (1,270 mi). As was expected, the performance of the SM.84 was superior to the SM.79.

== Operational history ==
The first unit to operate the aircraft was 12° Stormo (Wing), 41° Gruppo (Group), on 2 February 1941. Based at Rodi, the first actions of this Group were not successful, and two aircraft landed in Turkey being lost (their crews later returned to Rodi).

36° Stormo (108 and 109 Gr) received its SM.84s on 7 May 1941, and was based at Decimomannu airbase, Sardinia, from September 1941. On 27 September 1941, 12 aircraft of 36° Stormo took off to attack a British convoy to Malta (Operation Halberd). One aircraft turned back after developing a mechanical fault, but the remainder pressed on with their attack. The first group, led by Arduino Buri, attacked the British ships and Buri managed to torpedo HMS Nelson, putting her out of action for six months. Of the first section, one aircraft was shot down, and the second section had two aircraft shot down out of three. When Seidl went in with his five aircraft, he was shot down together with another two. While the damage to Nelson was a success, the only one of this type that Italian torpedo bombers obtained, it was paid for by the loss of six aircraft, and almost all their crews, more than thirty men. The next day a merchant ship, Empire Pelican, was sunk by SM.79s with only one loss. The rest of the convoy reached Malta with their supplies.

After these losses, 36° Stormo continued in its task of attacking enemy ships and sank the merchant ship Empire Defender in November, and nine SM.84s badly damaged HMS Penelope on 9 April 1942. 282^{a} Squadriglia was also involved in such missions, with some success.

7° Stormo (4° and 5° Gruppo), based in Sicily, used SM.84s to bomb Malta in July 1941. In mid-October 1941, 32° Stormo were equipped with SM.84s, one group of torpedo bombers and the other of bombers, to best optimize the attack against ships. This Wing took part in attacks on the Allied landings of Operation Torch but, by the end of December, the unit had lost 20 aircraft and was retired from operations.

During Spring and Summer 1942, 4° Gruppo Autonomo Bombardamento Terrestre flew bombing sorties against targets in Malta, suffering painful losses. On 12 May, three SM.84 from 14^{a} Squadriglia (plus four Junkers Ju 88), escorted by Italian and German fighters, attacked Ta' Qali airfield. All Savoia-Marchetti bombers were hit hard by Spitfires and Hurricanes based on the besieged island. RAF pilots claimed two SM.84s (mistaken for CANT Z.1007s) destroyed. Actually the Savoia flown by pilot Tenente Vinicio Vego Scocco was shot down. Three Italian airmen parachuted but none survived: one drowned and two were massacred at the foot of the cliff where they had landed.

In June 1942, nine bombers of same 4° Gruppo plus 14 torpedo bombers of 36° Stormo attacked the Malta convoy of Operation Harpoon, with at least two losses to Spitfires, and one downed by Anti-aircraft fire. 4° Gruppo suffered more losses on 4 July 1942, when three SM.84s flew back to Malta to bomb the Luqa airport. The Italian trimotors were escorted by numerous Messerschmitt Bf 109s, Macchi C.202s and Reggiane Re.2001s. Diving out of the sun and from a superior height, Spitfires of the No. 249 Squadron RAF managed to infiltrate the dense escort of the Axis fighters and to hit hard the Savoia-Marchettis (again, exchanged for CANT Z.1007), claiming all three shot down. During that sortie, 4° Gruppo suffered two losses: a SM.84 crashed offshore, possibly the one piloted by Tenente Raffaele Notari, from 15^{a} Squadriglia. A second Savoia-Marchetti, piloted by Sergente Maggiore Romolo Cristiani, of the 14^{a} Squadriglia, crashed on Ta' Garda. The third SM.84, although it had been repeatedly hit, managed to fly back to Sicily.

During Operation Pedestal in August 1942, 10 SM.84s used special Motobomba circling torpedoes to attack the convoy, losing two aircraft to enemy fighters. Aircraft of 32° and 36° Wing also attacked the convoy. The heavy German and Italian attacks, including those by SM.82s resulting in only five of the fourteen ships of the convoy reaching Malta, however their supplies were fundamental to saving the garrison, after the almost total failure of the previous operation.

While other groups were still receiving the aircraft, 36° and 7° Wing had stopped flying it by October 1942, while 32° went in action against North African targets. It lost 20 aircraft and returned in Apulia to regroup in December 1942. Soon 38° Gr had the new SM.84bis (early 1943), this last version was delivered to 8° Stormo (27° and 28° Gruppos). The decline had already started. The use of the aircraft with 8° Stormo to resupply troops in North Africa was a failure: despite having a far higher speed than the SM.82, the useful payload of the SM.84 was too small. The aircraft was gradually phased out, replaced by the CANT Z.1007bis, and even the SM.79. By 10 July 1943, 43° Wing, flying from Gioia del Colle, in Apulia, was the only unit still flying the SM.84.

In September 1943, despite the near depletion of bomber units, there were still 150 SM.84s available, with over 100 serviceable. Almost all of these were captured by the Germans, though they were rarely used. Some were sent to the Slovak Air Force, and 10 remained with RSI's Aeronautica Nazionale Repubblicana, but were not used. Seven were used by the Italian Co-Belligerent Air Force as transports. Shortly after the end of the war, the aircraft was phased out of service.

Overall, the SM.84 was a failed design (Francesco Pricolo called it a 'wrong aircraft', while Ettore Muti complained in 1941 about its awful handling and take off). It was never liked by its crews and never capable of replacing the SM.79. When the final version of the Sparviero, the SM.79bis, became available, the SM.84 was withdrawn. In the bomber role it was inferior to the CANT.1007 ter, especially at altitude (the SM.84 was almost impossible to fly above 5,000 m). Torpedo-bombers were required to be agile and fast in order to engage their targets and many designs experienced problems with higher weights and wing loading than they were designed for. The SM.84 was far heavier than the SM.79 and when the final version the SM.79bis became available, it was preferred to the SM.84. The SM.79bis, with improved engines was still lighter than the SM.84 and a better aircraft (with lower wing loading and better power-to weight ratio) for the role.

Another critical report about SM.84 came from the 43° Stormo B.T. command, in an official document. It reports how this bomber wing performed its task, starting with bombing missions from Gioia del Colle on 13 July 1943. The 41° Stormo commander complained the very small attack force was not enough to saturate the enemy's strong defences, even by night; the small number of pilots trained for night operations and thus the small number of sorties and the very poor performance of the SM.84.

== Variants ==
SM.84bis
With several modifications, but not a substantial evolution.
SM.84ter
A single aircraft, completed in 1944, fitted with 1,119 kW (1,500 hp) Piaggio P.XII engines, capable of speeds exceeding 500 km/h (310 mph). Destroyed by fire during a landing accident in 1946.

== Operators ==
Kingdom of Italy

Regia Aeronautica:

  - 7° Stormo, from 29 July 1941 to October 1942:
    - 4° Gruppo (Squadriglie 14^{a} and 15^{a} ) and 25° Gruppo (Squadriglie 8^{a} and 9^{a})
  - 8° Stormo, since 1943:
    - 27° Gruppo (Squadriglie 18^{a} and 52^{a}) and 28° Gruppo (Squadriglie 10^{a} and 19^{a})
  - 10° Stormo, since November 1942:
    - one group only, 30° Gruppo
  - 12° Stormo BT, from 2 February 1941:
    - 41° Gruppo (Squadriglie 204^{a} and 205^{a}) and 42° Gruppo
  - 32° Stormo, from October 1941 to 1943:
    - 38° Gruppo (Squadriglie 49^{a} and 50^{a}) and 89° Gruppo (Squadriglie 228^{a} and 229^{a})
  - 36° Stormo, from 7 May 1941 to October 1942:
    - 108° Gruppo (Squadriglie 256^{a} and 257^{a}) and 109° Gruppo (Squadriglie 258^{a} and 259^{a})
  - 43° Stormo: from late July 1942 to summer 1943:
    - 98° Gruppo (Squadriglie 240^{a} and 241^{a}) and 99° Gruppo (Squadriglie 242^{a} and 243^{a})
  - 282^{a} Squadriglia AS
- Italian Co-Belligerent Air Force

Italy

- Italian Air Force operated some surviving aircraft until 1949

Germany

- Luftwaffe

Slovakia Slovaks had been given 10 aircraft

- Slovak Air Force (1939–1945)
- Slovak Insurgent Air Force

== Specifications (SM.84) ==
Data from World Encyclopedia of Military Aircraft

General characteristics

- Crew: 5
- Length: 17.93 m (58 ft 10 in)
- Wingspan: 21.1 m (69 ft 3 in)
- Height: 4.59 m (15 ft 1 in)
- Wing area: 61 m^{2} (660 sq ft)
- Empty weight: 8,846 kg (19,502 lb)
- Gross weight: 13,228 kg (29,163 lb)
- Powerplant: 3 × Piaggio P.XI R.C.40 14-cylinder air-cooled radial piston engine, 746 kW (1,000 hp) each

Performance

- Maximum speed: 467 km/h (290 mph, 252 kn)
- Range: 1,830 km (1,140 mi, 990 nmi)
- Service ceiling: 7,900 m (25,900 ft)

Armament

- Guns: 4 × 12.7 mm (.50 in) Scotti machine guns (1 in dorsal turret, 1 in ventral position and 2 in waist positions)
- Bombs: 2,000 kg (4,410 lb) of bombs or 2 × torpedoes

== See also ==
Related development

- Savoia-Marchetti SM.79
- Savoia-Marchetti SM.89

Aircraft of comparable role, configuration, and era

- CANT Z.1007
- CANT Z.1018

Related lists

- List of aircraft of World War II
- List of Regia Aeronautica aircraft used in World War II
