= SIAI S.9 =

SS.9
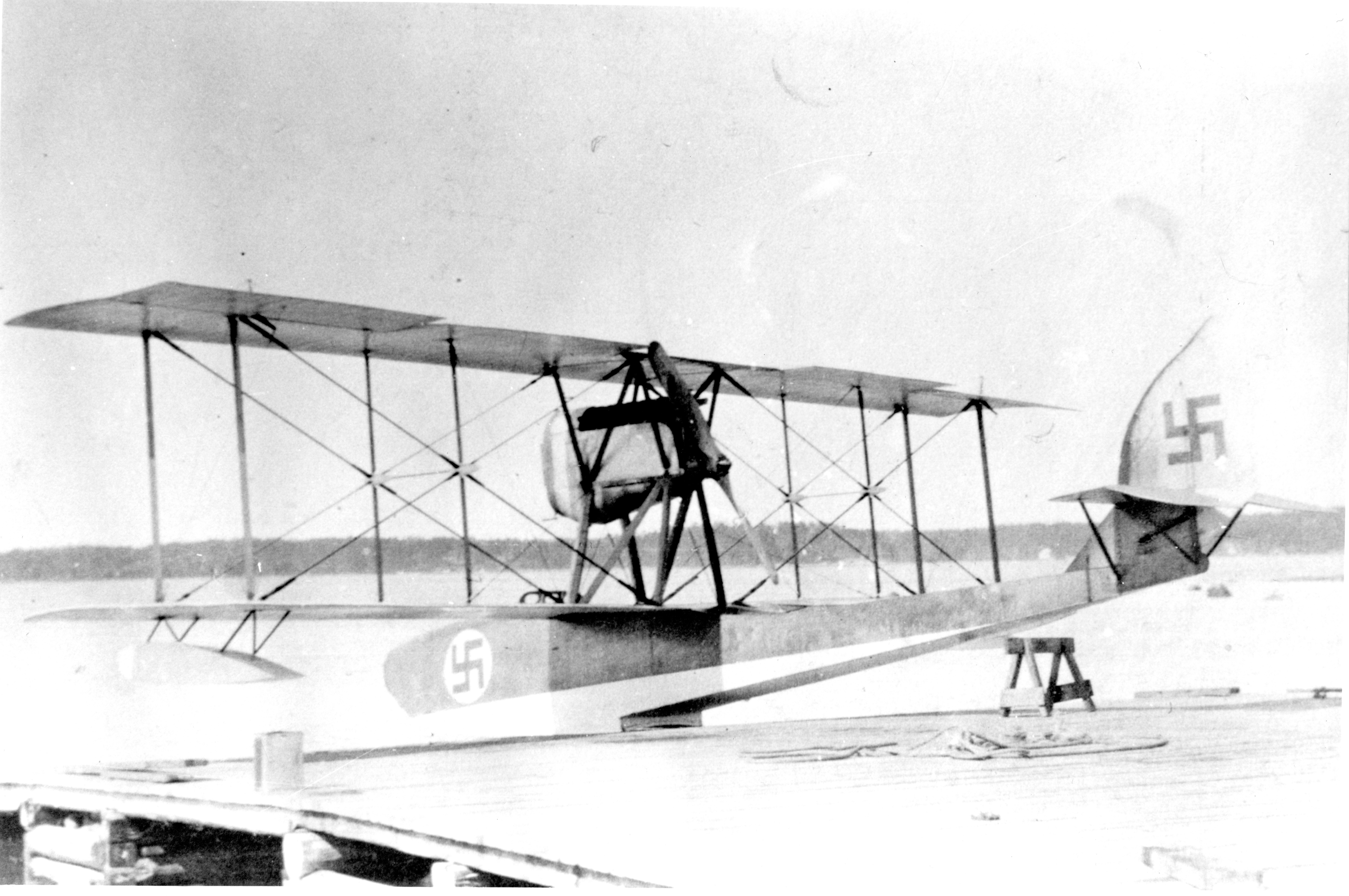

General information
- Type: Flying boat
- Manufacturer: SIAI

History
- First flight: 1918
- Variants: SIAI S.12

The SIAI Savoia S.9 was an Italian reconnaissance flying boat, manufactured by Societa Idrovolanti Alta Italia (S.I.A.I.) from 1918. The wing structure was unusual by being a single-bay biplane wing, with additional struts mounted mid-bay at the junction of the flying and landing wires, so that it appeared to have a two-bay wing. The S.9 was also licence-built in France by CAMS (Chantiers Aéro-Maritimes de la Seine) as the CAMS C.9.

== Operators ==
Finland

- Finnish Air Force

Kingdom of Italy

- Corpo Aeronautico Militare
- Regia Aeronautica

== Specifications (S.9) ==
Data from

General characteristics

- Crew: 2
- Length: 10 m (32 ft 10 in)
- Wingspan: 13.2 m (43 ft 4 in)
- Height: 3.9 m (12 ft 10 in)
- Empty weight: 1,740 kg (3,836 lb)
- Gross weight: 3,828 kg (8,439 lb)
- Powerplant: 1 × Fiat A.12bis 6-cylinder water-cooled in-line piston engine, 220 kW (300 hp)

Performance

- Maximum speed: 140 km/h (87 mph, 76 kn)

Armament

- Guns: 1 x machine gun
- Bombs: 50 kg (110 lb) of bombs
