= SIAI-Marchetti SM.101 =

General information
- Type: Single-engined transport cabin monoplane
- Manufacturer: SIAI-Marchetti
- Number built: 1

History
- First flight: 1947

The SIAI-Marchetti SM.101 was a 1940s Italian single-engined light transport cabin monoplane designed and built by SIAI-Marchetti.

== Development ==
The SM.101 was a single-engined low-wing cantilever monoplane with a tailwheel landing gear with retractable main gear. It had an enclosed cabin for two crew and six passengers and was powered by a nose-mounted 235 hp (175 kW) Walter Bora radial engine. The prototype and only SM.101 first flew on 20 December 1947 but the company soon decided that a single-engined passenger transport was not likely to sell and the company developed the design with two engines as the SM.102.

== Specifications (SM.101) ==
Data from Jane's all the World's Aircraft 1947

General characteristics

- Crew: 2
- Capacity: 6 passengers
- Length: 10.2 m (33 ft 6 in)
- Wingspan: 16.5 m (54 ft 2 in)
- Height: 3 m (9 ft 10 in)
- Wing area: 29.91 m^{2} (321.9 sq ft)
- Aspect ratio: 9
- Empty weight: 1,320 kg (2,910 lb)
- Gross weight: 2,190 kg (4,828 lb)
- Powerplant: 1 × Walter Bora 9-cylinder air-cooled radial engine, 175 kW (235 hp)

Performance

- Maximum speed: 240 km/h (150 mph, 130 kn) at sea level
- Cruise speed: 225 km/h (140 mph, 121 kn) 70% power at 2,750 m (9,020 ft)
- Landing speed: 75 km/h (47 mph; 40 kn)
- Range: 1,250 km (780 mi, 670 nmi)
- Service ceiling: 4,800 m (15,700 ft)
- Wing loading: 73.2 kg/m^{2} (15.0 lb/sq ft)
- Power/mass: 12.71 kg/kW (20.9 lb/hp)

== See also ==
Related development

- SIAI-Marchetti SM.102
