= Walter Bora =

1930s Czech piston aircraft engine

Bora
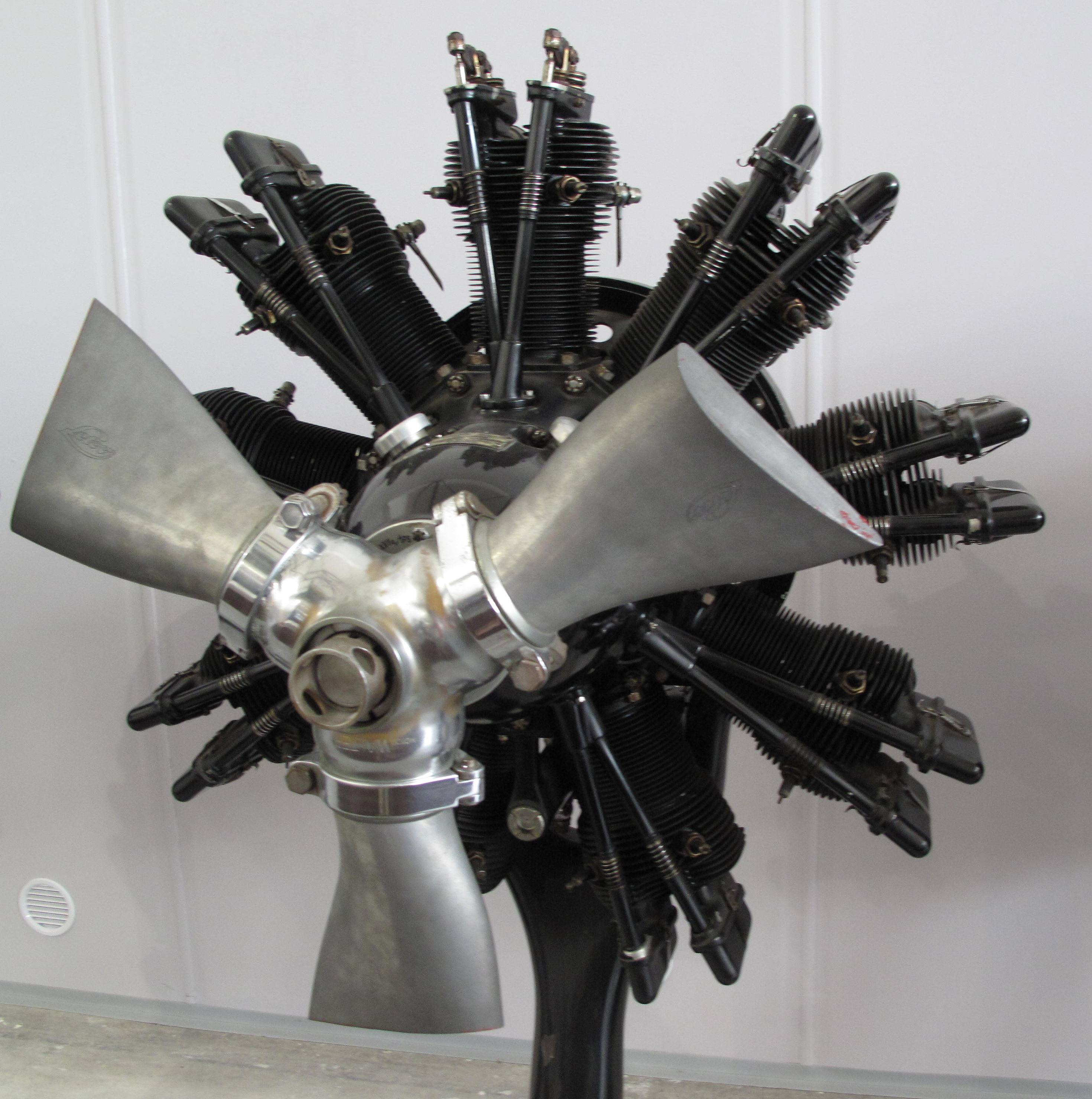
- Walter Bora
- Type: Radial aero engine
- National origin: Czechoslovakia
- Manufacturer: Walter Aircraft Engines

The Walter Bora was a Czechoslovak nine-cylinder, air-cooled radial engine for powering light aircraft that was developed in the 1930s by Walter Aircraft Engines.

== Variants ==
Bora II
Direct drive engine
Bora II-R
Geared engine, reduction ratio 0.666:1

== Applications ==
- Aero A.200
- Nardi FN.305
- RWD-9
- SIAI-Marchetti SM.101

== Engines on display ==
A preserved example of the Walter Bora engine is on display at the following museum:

- Prague Aviation Museum, Kbely

== Specifications (Bora II-R) ==
Data from Flight

=== General characteristics ===
- Type: 9-cylinder radial piston engine
- Bore: 105 mm (4.1 in)
- Stroke: 120 mm (4.7 in)
- Dry weight: 172 kg (379 lb)

=== Components ===
- Valvetrain: One intake and one exhaust valve per cylinder
- Fuel system: Carburettor
- Fuel type: Petrol
- Cooling system: Air-cooled

=== Performance ===
- Power output: 183 kW (245 hp) at 2,400 rpm
- Compression ratio: 6.3:1
- Power-to-weight ratio: 1 kW/kg (0.65 hp/lb)

== See also ==
Comparable engines

- Salmson AD.9
- Wolseley Aries

Related lists

- List of aircraft engines
