= SIAI S.13 =

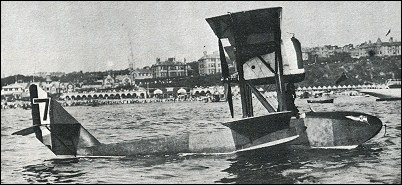

General information
- Type: Reconnaissance-fighter flying-boat
- National origin: Italy
- Manufacturer: SIAI
- Status: Retired
- Primary user: Regia Marina

The SIAI S.13 was an Italian biplane reconnaissance flying-boat from 1919.

== Design and development ==
Designed by the Società Idrovolanti Alta Italia (SIAI) as a smaller version of the earlier S.12, the S.13 was a single-engine biplane reconnaissance-fighter flying boat powered by a 187 kW (251 hp) Isotta Fraschini V.6 engine. It had a crew of two in side-by-side seats behind a single windscreen; the observer had a single machine gun.

Emile Taddéoli, a Swiss flight pioneer was hired as test pilot for Savoia in mid-1914. On 12 July 1919, with a passenger on board, he flew from Calende on Lago Maggiore to Lake Geneva in 110 minutes, overflying the Mont Blanc (4,695 m (15,404 ft)) massif in a SIAI S.13.

The Royal Italian Navy took delivery of 12 aircraft in 1919, and examples were exported to Japan, Norway, Spain, Sweden, and Yugoslavia. In France, the S.13 was built under license as the CAMS C.13 and the Spanish naval workshops in Barcelona also built seven under licence.

A single-seat version, the S.13 Tipo, was ordered by the Royal Italian Navy, but was later cancelled when the Royal Navy decided to develop the Macchi M.7 instead and a civilian version, the S.13bis, failed to attract any orders.

== Variants ==
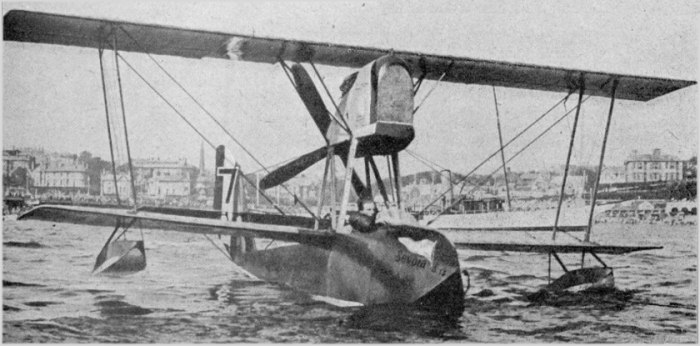

S.13
Production flying boat
S.13 Tipo
Single-seat variant, not built.
S.13bis
Civil variant, not built.
CAMS C-13
French licence-built S.13

== Operators ==
France (as CAMS C-13)

- Aéronavale

Kingdom of Italy

- Regia Marina

Japan

- Imperial Japanese Navy Air Service

Norway

- Royal Norwegian Navy Air Service

Spain

- Spanish Air Force

Sweden

- Swedish Navy (Marinens Flygväsen)

Yugoslavia

- Royal Yugoslav Navy

== Specifications (S13) ==
General characteristics

- Crew: two (pilot, observer)
- Powerplant: 1 × Isotta Fraschini V.6 , 187 kW (250 hp)

Performance

- Maximum speed: 197 km/h (122 mph, 106 kn)

Armament

- 1 × 7.7mm (0.303in) machine-gun

== See also ==
Related lists

- List of flying boats and floatplanes
