= SIAI S.19 =

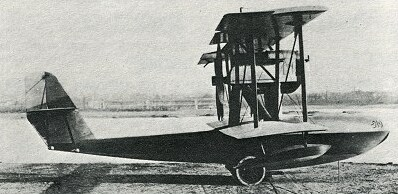

General information
- Type: Racing flying boat
- National origin: Italy
- Manufacturer: SIAI
- Primary user: Italy
- Number built: 1

History
- First flight: 1920

The SIAI S.19 was an Italian racing flying boat built by SIAI for the 1920 Schneider Trophy race.

== Design and development ==
The S.19 was a single-seat biplane flying boat with its engine mounted on struts above its hull and below its upper wing. The 373 kW (500 hp) Ansaldo San Giorgio 4E-29 engine drove a two-bladed pusher propeller. Small stabilizer floats were mounted beneath the lower wing on each side.

== Operational history ==
The S.19's engine was not ready in time for the 1920 Schneider Trophy race, and the aircraft did not participate.

== Operators ==
Kingdom of Italy

== Specifications ==
Data from Aviation: SIAI racing seaplanes

General characteristics

- Crew: 1
- Length: 10 m (32 ft 10 in)
- Wingspan: 11.72 m (38 ft 5 in)
- Gross weight: 2,360 kg (5,203 lb)
- Powerplant: 1 × Ansaldo San Giorgio 4E-29 , 373 kW (500 hp)

Performance

- Maximum speed: 222 km/h (138 mph, 120 kn)

== See also ==
- Schneider Trophy

Related lists

- List of flying boats and floatplanes
