= Savoia-Marchetti S.72 =

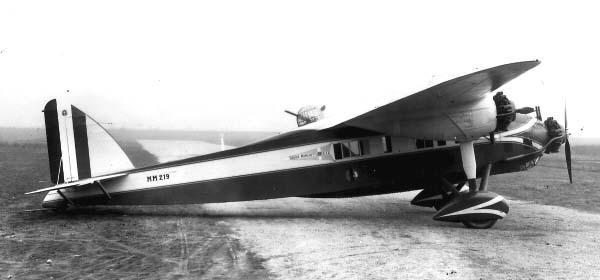

General information
- Type: Bomber/transport
- National origin: Italy
- Manufacturer: Savoia-Marchetti
- Primary users: China Regia Aeronautica
- Number built: 7

History
- First flight: 1934

The Savoia-Marchetti S.72 was an Italian three-engine transport monoplane designed and built by Savoia-Marchetti as an enlarged and strengthened version of the earlier S.71. The S.72 was a three-engine, high-wing cantilever monoplane with a fixed tailwheel landing gear. Designed as a heavy bomber, the prototype was first flown in 1934 powered by three 410 kW (550 hp) Alfa Romeo licence-built Bristol Pegasus radial engines.

== Operational history ==
The Regia Aeronautica showed no interest in the aircraft as a heavy bomber and the prototype was used as a VIP transport. After being demonstrated in China in 1935 the prototype was handed over to Generalissimo Chiang Kai-shek as a gift. Six more aircraft were ordered by the Chinese and assembled in China. It is presumed that all the aircraft were destroyed in Japanese air raids in 1937.

== Operators ==
Italy

- Regia Aeronautica

China

- Chinese Nationalist Air Force operated 6 aircraft.

== Specifications ==
Data from

General characteristics

- Length: 19.95 m (65 ft 5.5 in)
- Wingspan: 29.68 m (97 ft 4.5 in)
- Height: 5.5 m (18 ft 0.5 in)
- Wing area: 118.50 m^{2} (1,275.57 sq ft)
- Empty weight: 6,800 kg (14,991 lb)
- Gross weight: 12,800 kg (28,219 lb)
- Powerplant: 3 × Alfa Romeo licence-built Bristol Pegasus engine , 410 kW (550 hp) each

Performance

- Maximum speed: 295 km/h (183 mph, 159 kn)
- Range: 2,000 km (1,243 mi, 1,080 nmi)
- Service ceiling: 8,000 m (26,245 ft)

Armament

- up to 6 × 7.7 mm (0.303 in) machine guns
- 1 × 20 mm cannon
- 1,000 kg (2,205 lb) of bombs

== See also ==
Related lists

- List of Interwar military aircraft
