= Savoia-Marchetti S.71 =

S.71
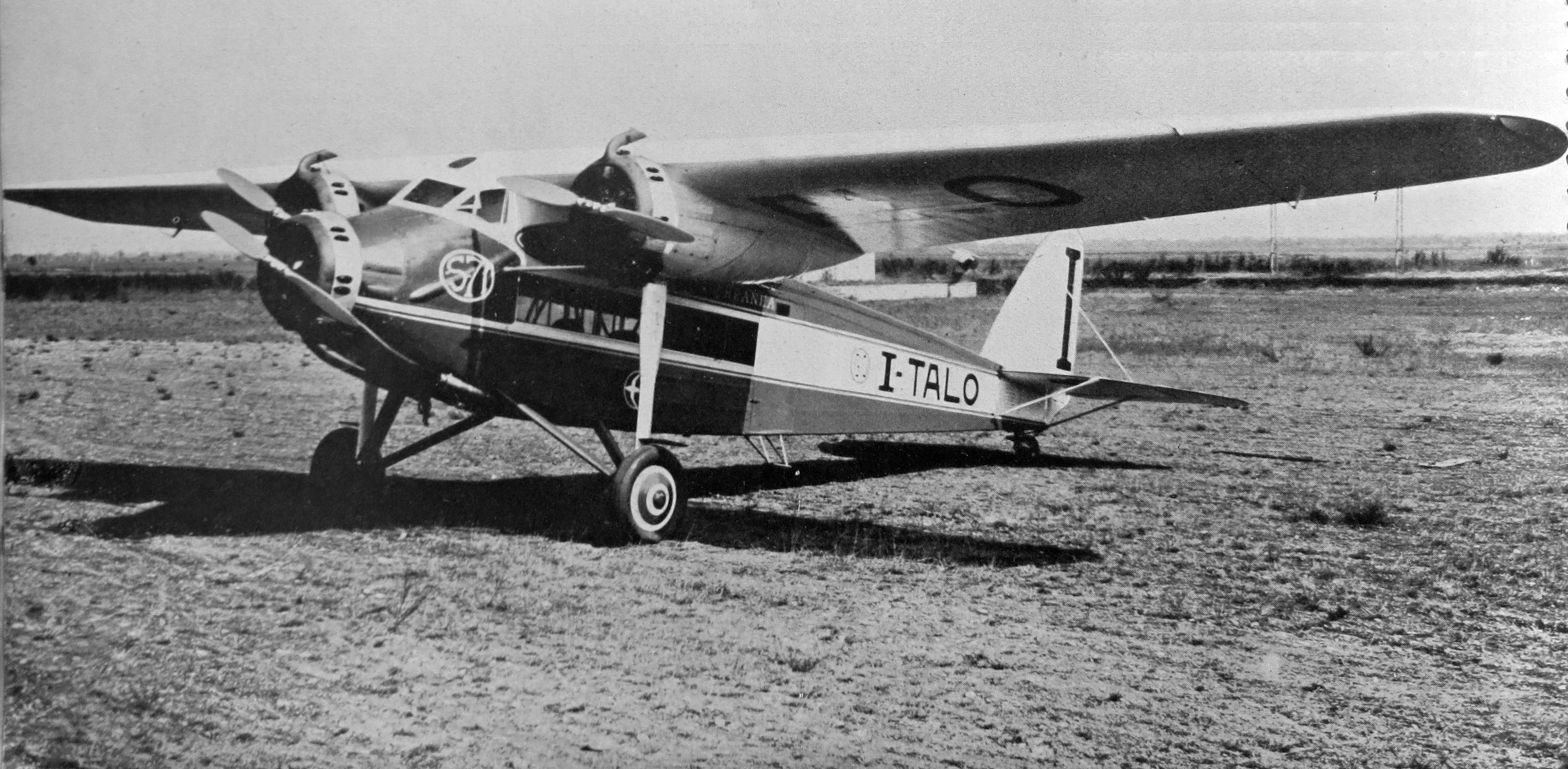

General information
- Type: Eight-passenger light transport
- National origin: Italy
- Manufacturer: Savoia-Marchetti
- Number built: 7

History
- First flight: 1930

The Savoia-Marchetti S.71 was an Italian eight-passenger light transport designed and built by Savoia-Marchetti. The S.71 was a three-engine, high-wing cantilever monoplane with a fixed tailwheel landing gear. It had a crew of four and room for eight passengers. The first four aircraft were powered by three 190 kW (260 hp) Walter Castor II radial engines, but the last three had 276 kW (370 hp) Piaggio P.VII engines.

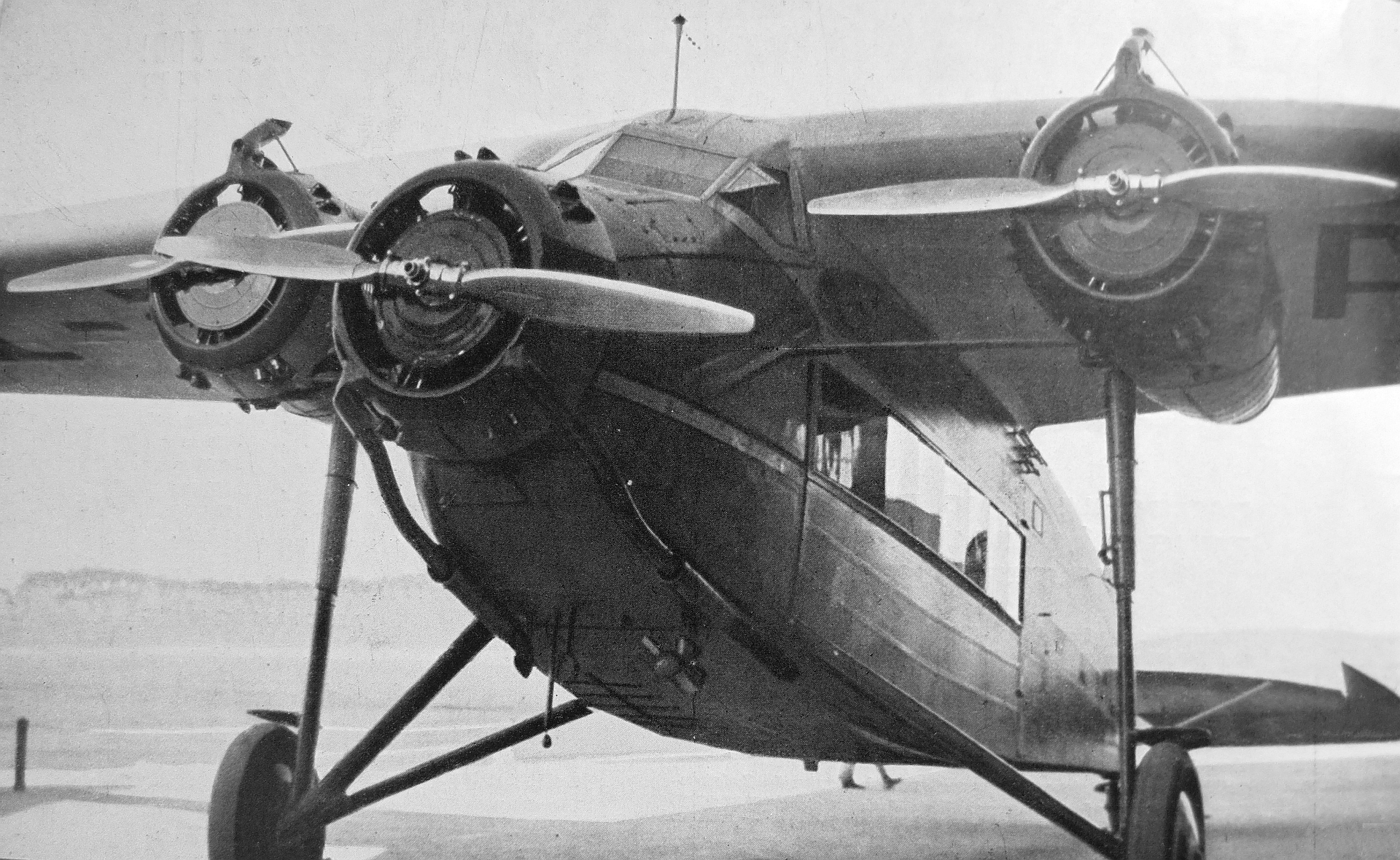
Savoia-Marchetti S.71 and Walter Castor II, Ala Littoria

== Specifications (Castor-powered) ==
Data from

General characteristics

- Crew: 4
- Capacity: 8 passengers
- Length: 14 m (45 ft 11.25 in)
- Wingspan: 21.20 m (69 ft 6.75 in)
- Height: 4.10 m (13 ft 5.5 in)
- Wing area: 60 m^{2} (645.86 sq ft)
- Empty weight: 2,900 kg (6,393 lb)
- Gross weight: 4,600 kg (10,141 lb)
- Powerplant: 3 × Walter Castor II radial engine , 190 kW (260 hp) each

Performance

- Maximum speed: 235 km/h (146 mph, 127 kn)
- Range: 1,600 km (994 mi, 864 nmi)
- Service ceiling: 5,250 m (17,550 ft)
