= SIAI S.12 =

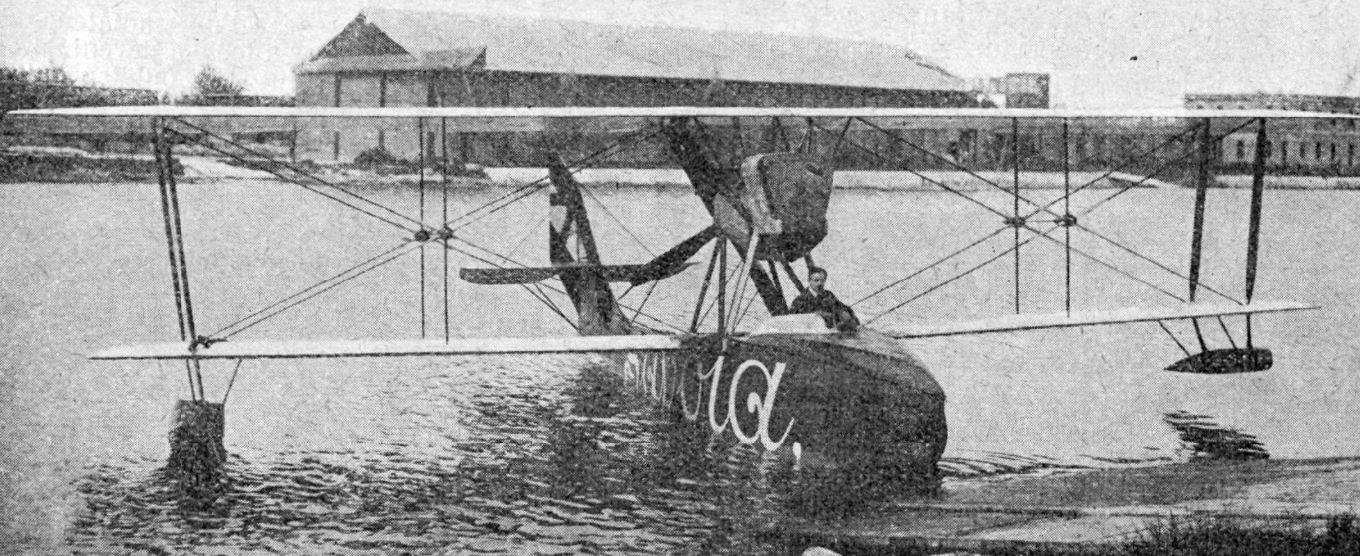

General information
- Type: Reconnaissance-bomber flying-boat
- Manufacturer: SIAI
- Designer: Raffaele Conflenti
- Number built: 1

History
- First flight: 1918
- Developed from: SIAI S.9

The SIAI S.12 was an Italian 1910s reconnaissance flying boat, and later Schneider Trophy racer.

== Design and development ==
The Societa Idrovolanti Alta Italia (SIAI) refined the design of the SIAI S.9 into the SIAI S.12 a single-engined biplane reconnaissance-bomber flying boat. It had a deep, contoured forward hull with a slim tapered rear section. The Italian Navy was not interested and no orders were placed.

== Operational history ==
The aircraft was used for the 1920 Schneider Trophy race, where it was known as the Savoia S.12. The contest was won by Italy as Great Britain had withdrawn from the race. Lt. Luigi Bolgna was the only pilot to complete the race in the Savioa S-12, achieving a speed of 107 mph (172.6 km/h). The aircraft achieved a maximum speed of 138 mph (222 km/h) on 7 January 1921.

== Specifications (S.12) ==
General characteristics

- Crew: 2
- Length: 10 m (32 ft 10 in)
- Wingspan: 11.72 m (38 ft 5 in)
- Max takeoff weight: 2,360 kg (5,203 lb)
- Powerplant: 1 × Ansaldo San Giorgio 4E-290 V-12 water-cooled piston engine, 410 kW (550 hp)
- Propellers: 4-bladed fixed-pitch pusher propeller

Performance

- Maximum speed: 222 km/h (138 mph, 120 kn)

== See also ==
Related lists

- List of flying boats and floatplanes
