= Savoia-Marchetti S.84 =

Italian airliner prototype

S.84
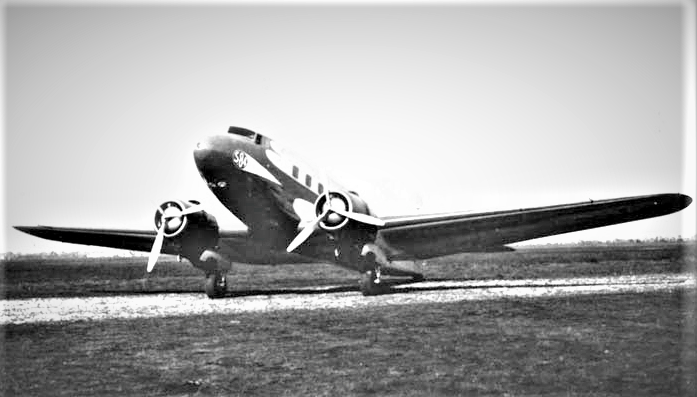

General information
- Type: Twin-engined airliner
- National origin: Italy
- Manufacturer: Savoia-Marchetti
- Number built: 1

History
- First flight: 1936

The Savoia-Marchetti S.84 was an Italian twin-engined airliner developed in Italy, from the three-engined Savoia-Marchetti S.73; only the prototype was completed and the designation was re-used for the Savoia-Marchetti SM.84.

== Specifications (S.84 prototype) ==
Data from Italian Civil and Military aircraft 1930−1945

General characteristics

- Crew: 4+
- Capacity: 18 passengers, 269 kg (594 lb) of baggage and 519 kg (1,144 lb) of cargo and mail
- Length: 19.8 m (65 ft 0 in)
- Wingspan: 24 m (78 ft 9 in)
- Empty weight: 5,987 kg (13,200 lb)
- Gross weight: 9,480 kg (20,900 lb)
- Powerplant: 2 × Gnome-Rhône 14Krsd 14-cylinder air-cooled radial piston engines, 670 kW (900 hp) each

Performance

- Maximum speed: 350 km/h (220 mph, 190 kn) at 2,000 m (6,560 ft)
- Cruise speed: 315 km/h (196 mph, 170 kn)
- Range: 999 km (621 mi, 540 nmi)
- Service ceiling: 7,798 m (25,584 ft)
- Time to altitude: 4,000 m (13,120 ft) in 18 minutes
