= SIAI-Marchetti SM.102 =

Italian cabin monoplane

General information
- Type: Twin-engined transport cabin monoplane
- Manufacturer: SIAI-Marchetti
- Primary user: Italian Air Force
- Number built: 21

History
- First flight: 1949
- Retired: 1959
- Developed from: SIAI-Marchetti SM.101

The SIAI-Marchetti SM.102 was a 1940s Italian light transport cabin monoplane designed and built by SIAI-Marchetti.

== Development ==
The SM.102 was developed from the abandoned SM.101 single-engined light transport monoplane. The SM.102 was a twin-engined low-wing cantilever monoplane with a tailwheel landing gear with retractable main gear. It had an enclosed cabin for two crew and eight passengers and the prototype was powered by two 500 hp (373 kW) Ranger SGV-770C-1B engines, one mounted on the leading edge of each wing. The prototype (registered I-NDIA) first flew on 24 February 1949 from Vergiate. The prototype was demonstrated in India and both the Middle and Far East without the success of any orders so it was decided to modify the design to meet a requirement for a light transport for the Italian Air Force. The new version was re-engined with two 450 hp (336 kW) Pratt & Whitney R-985 Wasp Junior radial engines and first flew on 7 April 1950. A small production run for the Italian Air Force followed.

== Operators ==
Italy

- Italian Air Force operated 21 SIAI-Marchetti SM.102 until 1959

== Specifications ==
Data from Jane's All The World's Aircraft 1951–52.

General characteristics

- Crew: 2
- Capacity: 8 passengers
- Length: 13.1 m (43 ft 0 in)
- Wingspan: 18 m (59 ft 1 in)
- Height: 3.47 m (11 ft 5 in)
- Wing area: 42.5 m^{2} (457 sq ft)
- Aspect ratio: 9:1
- Empty weight: 3,450 kg (7,606 lb)
- Gross weight: 5,050 kg (11,133 lb)
- Fuel capacity: 775 L (170 imp gal; 205 US gal)
- Powerplant: 2 × Pratt & Whitney R-985 Wasp Junior radial engine 9-cylinder air-cooled radial engines, 340 kW (450 hp) each

Performance

- Maximum speed: 344 km/h (214 mph, 186 kn) at 1,800 m (5,900 ft)
- Cruise speed: 288 km/h (179 mph, 156 kn) at 3,510 m (11,520 ft) (60% power)
- Service ceiling: 6,000 m (20,000 ft)
- Time to altitude:
  - 6 minutes to 1,525 m (5,003 ft)
  - 22 minutes to 4,575 m (15,010 ft)

== See also ==
Aircraft of comparable role, configuration, and era

- Avro Anson
- Airspeed Oxford
