= LATI (airline) =

L.A.T.I.-Linee Aeree Transcontinentali Italiane
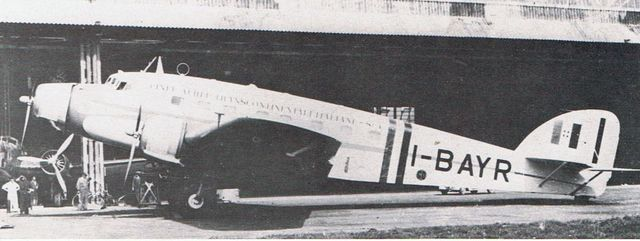
- SM-75
- Founded: 11 September 1939
- Commenced operations: 5 December 1939
- Ceased operations: 1943 (dissolved in 1956)
- Hubs: Rome

LATI-Linee Aeree Transcontinentali Italiane (Italian transcontinental airlines) was an airline which operated from Italy to South America between 1939 and 1941. It originated out of Ala Littoria flag carrier assets. Although the transatlantic service was permanently discontinued in December 1941, the company continued to exist as a paper entity until 1956.

== History ==
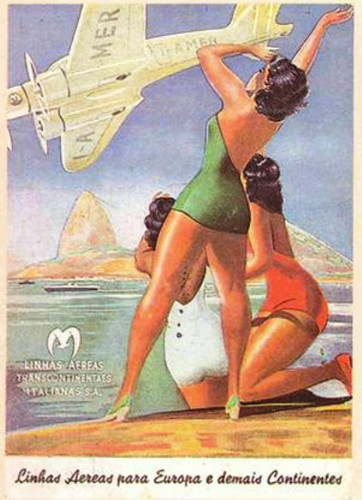

LATI was established on 11 September 1939, a few days after the start of World War II. To facilitate crossing the Atlantic Ocean Italy and Portuguese government built up a brand new airport in the Ilha do Sal, the first airport in Cape Verde archipelago. It was essentially meant to serve as a fuel and provisions stop for flights from Rome to South America. In 1947, the Portuguese colonial administration purchased the airport.

The first flight was made by a Savoia-Marchetti SM 83 between Rome and Brazil on 5 December 1939 along the route:

- Rome – Seville – Lisbon – Villa Cisneros – Ilha do Sal (European section);
- Ilha do Sal – Fernando de Noronha – Recife (Atlantic section);
- Recife – Salvador – Rio de Janeiro (South American section).

The flight lasted 23 hours (for the 9,200 km distance). Unfortunately, on the return journey the trimotor, registered I-ARPA, crashed near the town of Essaouira, Morocco, with the loss of the aircraft and the death of all occupants.

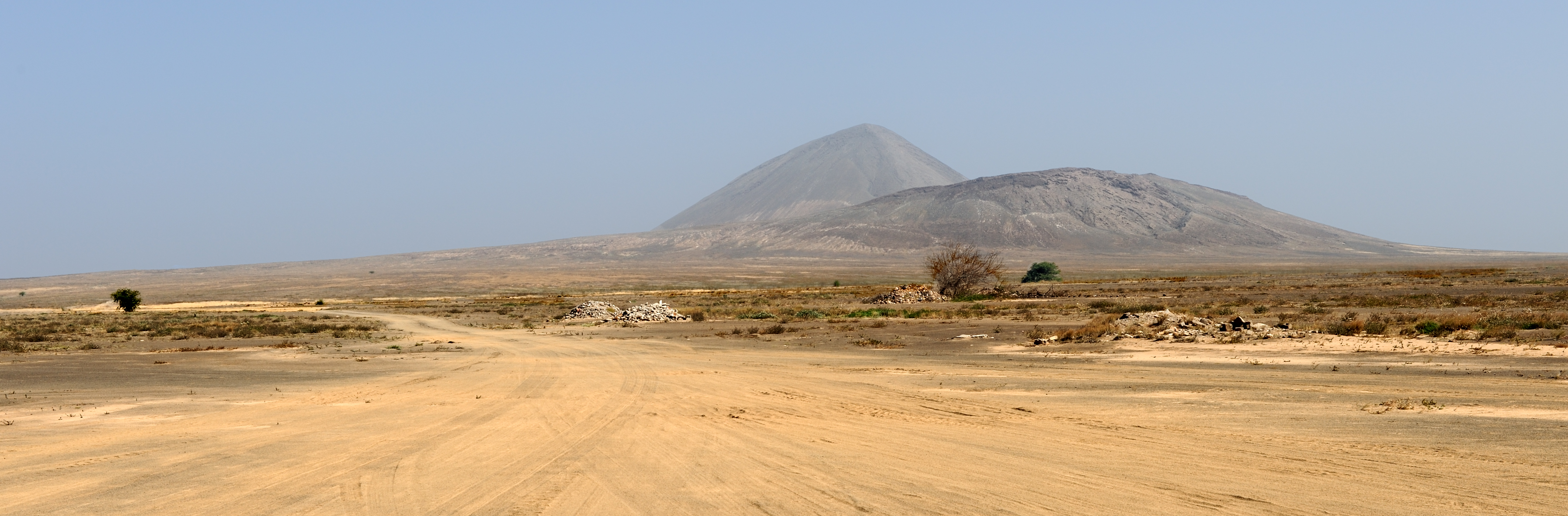
Dirt airport runway

Initially the air connection operated weekly, departing from Italy on Thursdays. After June 10, 1940, the day Italy entered the war, it had to be reduced to just one crossing a month. The flights were postal services but a few passengers were allowed to use them. Furthermore, LATI had been able to pick up much of the mail traffic that German Deutsche Luft Hansa had provided to South America prior to ending its service in August, 1939. Until December 1941 it was the main carrier of postal services between Western European territories occupied by the Axis and South America. On January 15, 1941, during the return trip of the flight #104, the I-BAYR registered SM-75 was lost in the Atlantic Ocean with eight flight crew and two passengers. It seems that it was overloaded (more than 10 tons) with diamonds and special materials that were needed for military industrial production in Italy. It was the only disaster that struck the route. In summer 1941 the route was expanded, to reach Buenos Aires (capital of Argentina).

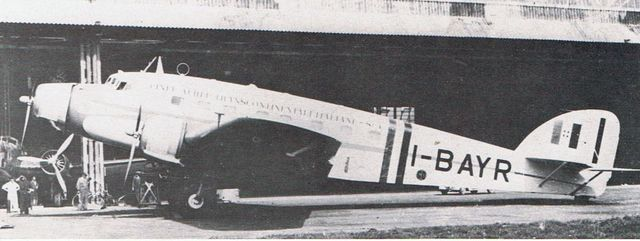
The SM-75 I-BAYR which was lost on January 15, 1941.

The last flight was performed on 19 December 1941, after the entry into the war of the United States of America. The North American nation was already jealous of the Atlantic airspace and pressured South American nations to block the link. So, Brazil prohibited the use of its territory for any operations. LATI had also been already accused of smuggling rare minerals and collaborating with the Royal Italian Navy in tracking British ships in the Atlantic Ocean. The airline recorded 211 trans-Atlantic flights, 132 of which saw the use of a specially equipped Savoia-Marchetti SM 83. The speed reached 300 km/h but the payload was limited to 500 kg.

Afterwards LATI focused exclusively on European (Athens, Seville, and Lisbon) and African (Algiers, Benghazi, Derna, Tripoli, and Tunis) routes until September 1943. During these years, on various occasions related to the conflict, the aircraft lost were one Fiat G.12, seven Savoia-Marchetti SM.75s, two Savoia-Marchetti SM.79s, two Savoia-Marchetti SM.82s, and five Savoia-Marchetti SM.83s. At the end of the war, the company, although formally still in existence, was unable to resume any type of activity until its liquidation in 1956, with the only interlude being a failed attempted merger with Alitalia-Aerolinee Internazionali Italiane.

== Bibliography ==
- M. Quilici, Quarant'anni di aviazione civile 1931-1971 (in Italian language), Ed. Museo Aeronautico Caproni di Taliedo, Roma, 1973
- AA.VV. (various authors), Le ali della rondine (in Italian language), I.T.A.C.A., Roma, 1992
- G. D'Avanzo, I lupi dell'aria (in Italian language), STH Publishing, Roma, 1992, ISBN 88-7147-000-1
- G. Mannone, Le ali del littorio (in Italian language), private issue, 2004
- L. Caliaro, Signori a bordo (in Italian language), Luckyplane, 2019, ISBN 978-8-8943919-1-6
- G. Endres G., Italian icon, Milton Keynes UK / Ingram Content Group UK Ltd., 2023, ISBN 978-0-9573744-5-4

== See also ==
- List of defunct airlines of Italy
