= Alessandro Marchetti (aircraft engineer) =

Italian aircraft engineer and designer

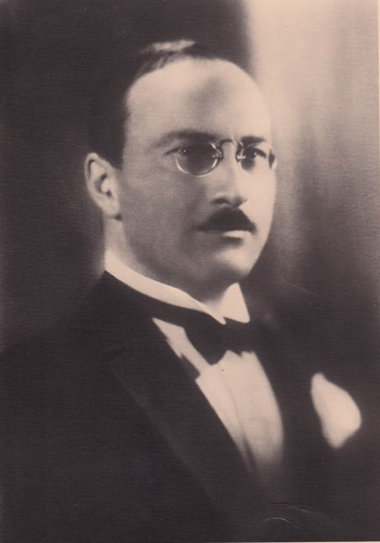
- Marchetti in the 1930s
- Born: 16 July 1884; Cori, Lazio, Kingdom of Italy
- Died: 5 December 1966 (aged 82); Busto Arsizio, Italy
- Education: Sapienza University of Rome
- Occupations: Aeronautical engineer, aircraft designer
- Known for: development of the Savoia-Marchetti SM.79 Sparviero
- Scientific career
- Fields: Aerodynamics
- Workplaces: Vickers; SIAI-Marchetti

Alessandro Marchetti (16 June 1884 – 5 December 1966) was an Italian engineer and airplane designer. Marchetti was born in Cori, Italy, and died in Busto Arsizio. He is best known for having created the Savoia-Marchetti SM.79 medium bomber.

== Biography ==
Born in 1884, Marchetti graduated in engineering from the Sapienza University of Rome in 1908. In 1910 he built his first aircraft, the sport biplane Chimera, and made his first flight. He started working for the Vickers subsidiary at Terni in 1917. For the Vikers he designed a very fast small biplane known as the Marchetti MVT (Marchetti-Vickers-Terni).

In 1922, he joined the SIAI (Società Idrovolanti Alta Italia) as technical director and in the period between the world wars designed a series of seaplanes of technical originality and commercial success. One of the first was the S.55, conceived as a torpedo seaplane, and then produced in various versions, both civil and military. Unlike previous flying boats with a central hull like the Dorniers or with two floats, he designed a craft with twin hulls set beneath a single large wing of considerable thickness, making it possible to eliminate the bracing.

Marchetti went on to produce the planes that Francesco de Pinedo flew around the world, and Arturo Ferrarin made a non-stop flight from Italy to Brazil. Marchetti is best known for having created the Savoia-Marchetti SM.79 and the Savoia-Marchetti SM.81, two World War II bomber aircraft. His last projects were the four-engine transport aircraft SM.95 (1943) and the light transport cabin monoplane SM.102 (1949).

== See also ==
- Savoia-Marchetti

== Bibliography ==
- Alessandro Marchetti entry (in Italian) in the Enciclopedia Treccani, 1934
- Curami, Andrea (2007). "MARCHETTI, Alessandro". Dizionario Biografico degli Italiani (in Italian). Vol. 69: Mangiabotti–Marconi. Rome: Istituto dell'Enciclopedia Italiana. ISBN 978-88-12-00032-6.
