= List of aircraft (Sa) =

This is a list of aircraft in alphabetical order beginning with 'Sa'.

== Sa ==
=== Saab ===
(Svenska Aeroplan AktieBolaget)

- Saab 17
- Saab 18
- Saab 19
- Saab 21
- Saab 21R
- Saab 24
- Saab 29 Tunnan
- Saab 32 Lansen
- Saab 35 Draken
- Saab 36
- Saab 37 Viggen
- Saab 38
- Saab 39 Gripen
- Saab 90 Scandia
- Saab 91 Safir
- Saab 105
- Saab 201
- Saab 202
- Saab 210
- Saab 340
- Saab 340 AEW&C
- Saab 1071
- Saab 1073
- Saab 2000
- Saab 2000 AEW&C
- Saab Safari
- Saab B3LA
- Saab J51
- Saab LX

=== Saarbrücken ===
- Saarbrücken Sportflugzeug

=== SAB ===
(Société et Ateliers Béchereau) See:Béchereau

=== SAB ===
(Société Aérienne Bordelaise)

- SAB-SEMA 10 (Societé Aérienne Bordelaise – Societé d'Etudes de Materiel d'Aviation)
- SAB-SEMA 12 (Societé Aérienne Bordelaise – Societé d'Etudes de Materiel d'Aviation)
- SAB AB-20
- SAB AB-21
- SAB AB-22
- SAB AB-80
- SAB DB-71
- SAB DB-80
- SAB DB-81
- SAB LH-70 (a.k.a. Lorraine Hanriot LH-70)
- SAB turret bomber (at least two built / converted with VERY large turrets)

=== SAB Aviation ===
(SAB Aviation srl, Benevento, Italy)

- SAB C-100 Vulcan

=== Sabath ===
(Joseph Sabath, Philadelphia, PA)

- Sabath 1932 helicoplane

=== SABCA ===
(Société Anonyme Belge de Constructions Aéronautiques)

- Sabca Demonty-Poncelot Cyrano
- SABCA Demonty-Poncelet limousine
- SABCA-Jullien SJ.1 – motorglider
- SABCA-Cambier monoplane
- SABCA CG-2 Camgul – 1925 single-engine biplane (Cambier-Guldentops)
- SABCA S.2 – 1926 single-engine airliner
- SABCA S.11 – 1931 trimotor airliner
- SABCA S.12 – 1931 trimotor airliner
- Sabca S.20 Libelulle
- SABCA S.30 – 1936
- SABCA S.40 – 1939 trainer
- SABCA S.45 – licence-built Caproni Ca.135
- SABCA S.46 – licence-built Caproni Ca.310
- SABCA S.47 – licence-built Caproni Ca.335
- SABCA S.48 – licence-built Caproni Ca.312
- SABCA S.50
- SABCA S.60
- Poncelet Vivette
- Poncelet Castar

=== Sabey ===
(Richard Sabey, CA)

- Sabey SX-1

=== Sablatnig ===
(Germany)

- Sablatnig B.I
- Sablatnig C.I
- Sablatnig C.II
- Sablatnig C.III
- Sablatnig C type experimental
- Sablatnig K.E.1
- Sablatnig N.I
- Sablatnig P.I
- Sablatnig P.II
- Sablatnig P.III
- Sablatnig SF-1
- Sablatnig SF-2
- Sablatnig SF-3
- Sablatnig SF-4
- Sablatnig SF-4Dr
- Sablatnig SF-5
- Sablatnig SF-6
- Sablatnig SF-7
- Sablatnig SF-8

=== Sablier ===
(Georges Sablier)

- Sablier S-4
- Sablier T.4
- Sablier S-8
- Sablier S-10
- Sablier S-11
- Sablier S-12
- Sablier S-14
- Sablier S-16
- Sablier S-18
- Sablier S-19
- Sablier S-20
- Sablier S-23
- Sablier S-26
- Sablier-Phély helicopter

=== Sabre Aircraft ===
(Sabre Aircraft Inc, Buckeye, AZ)

- Sabre 340
- Sabre Aeros 503
- Sabre Elite
- Sabre Trike
- Sabre Wildcat
- Sabre Venture

=== Sabrewing Aircraft ===
- Sabrewing Rhaegal

=== SAC ===
(Southern Airmotive Corp, Dothan, AL)

- SAC Special

=== Sack ===
(Arthur Sack)

- Sack AS-5
- Sack AS-6

=== Sackett ===
(Horace E Sackett, Gobles, MI)

- Sackett J-1 Jeanie

=== Saenger ===
- Saenger I
- Saenger II

=== SADASA ===
(Servicios Aereos de America S.A.)

- SADASA Cuahtemoc M-1

=== Sadler ===
(William) Sadler Aircraft Co, Scottsdale, AZ)

- Sadler A-22 Lasa
- Sadler Piranha
- Sadler Vampire
- Sadler UAV-19-50

=== Sadleir ===
( Sadleir / VTOL Industries Australia Ltd.)

- Sadleir Sa-7

=== SAF ===
(Société Aéronautique Française, formerly Constructions Aéronautiques E. Dewoitine and nationalized in 1936 as Société Nationale de Constructions Aéronautiques du Midi) see:Dewoitine

=== Safari ===
- Safari 400
- Safari 500

=== SAFAT ===
(SAFAT Aviation Complex, Sudan)

- SAFAT 01
- SAFAT 02
- SAFAT 03

=== Safe-Wings ===
(Master Air Pilots Inc, Rockford, IL)

- Safe-Wings SW-1
- Safe-Wings SW-2

=== Sage ===
(Frederick Sage & Company, United Kingdom)

- Sage Type 1
- Sage Type 2
- Sage Type 3
- Sage Type 4

=== Sagita ===
- Sagita Sherpa

=== Sagsetter ===
(Clarence & Raymond Sagstetter, Wausau, WI)

- Sagstetter 1935 Monoplane

=== SAI ===
(Skandinavisk Aero Industri A/S, Denmark)

- SAI KZ I
- SAI KZ II
- SAI KZ III
- SAI KZ IV
- SAI KZ VI Air Taxi
- SAI KZ VII
- SAI KZ VIII
- SAI KZ IX
- SAI KZ (IX) Ellehammer
- SAI KZ X
- SAI KZ XI crop duster
- SAI KZ G-I

=== SAI ===
(Società Aeronautica Italiana, Italy)

- Ambrosini SAI.1
- Ambrosini SAI.2
- Ambrosini SAI.2S
- Ambrosini SAI.3
- Ambrosini SAI.10
- Ambrosini SAI.11
- Ambrosini SAI.107
- Ambrosini SAI.207
- Ambrosini SAI.403 Dardo
- Ambrosini S.7
- Ambrosini S.1001 Grifo
- Ambrosini S.1002 Trasimeno
- Ambrosini SS.4
- Ambrosini Sagittario
- S.A.I G97 Spotter

=== SAI ===
(Supersonic Aerospace International)

- SAI Quiet Supersonic Transport

=== Sailair ===
(James T Robinson, 1723 W 29 Pl, Los Angeles, CA)

- Sailair Firefly
- Sailair JT-1

=== Sailplane Corporation of America ===
(United States) see also: Gus Briegleb

- Briegleb BG-6
- Briegleb BG-7
- Briegleb BG 12

=== SAIMAN ===
(Societa Anonima Industrie Mecchaniche Aeronautiche, Italy)

- SAIMAN 200
- SAIMAN 201
- SAIMAN 202
- SAIMAN 204
- SAIMAN 205
- SAIMAN C.4
- SAIMAN LB.2

=== SAIRC ===
- SAIRC Shahed 278

=== Saker ===
- Saker S-1

=== Saito ===
(Sotoichi Saito, Japan)

- Saito Saigai

=== Sakamoto ===
(Juichi Sakamoto, Japan)

- Sakamoto No.1
- Sakamoto No.2
- Sakamoto No.3
- Sakamoto No.4
- Sakamoto No.5
- Sakamoto No.6

=== Salina-Hoffman ===
(Louis E Salina & Earl Hoffman, Carnegie, PA)

- Salina-Hoffman Susie Bee

=== Salis ===
(Amicale Jean Baptiste Salis, France)

- Salis AJBS 10

=== Salisbury ===
(H.M. Salisbury, Walnut Grove, CA)

- Salisbury 1927 Biplane

=== Salmon ===
(Percy Salmon)

- Salmon Tandem Monoplane

=== Salmson ===
(Société des Moteurs Salmson / Compagnie Française d'Aviation – C.F.A., France)

- Salmson Sal. 1 A3
- Salmson 2
- Salmson 3
- Salmson 4
- Salmson 5
- Salmson 6
- Salmson 7
- Salmson D-1 Phrygane
- Salmson D-2 Phrygane
- Salmson D-3 Phryganet
- Salmson D-4 Phrygane Major
- Salmson D-6 CriCri
- Salmson D-7 CriCri Major
- Salmson D-21 Phrygane
- Salmson D-211 Phrygane
- Salmson D-57 Phryganet

=== Salmson-Béchereau ===
(France)

- Salmson-Béchereau SB-2
- Salmson-Béchereau SB-3
- Salmson-Béchereau SB-3bis
- Salmson-Béchereau SB-3ter
- Salmson-Béchereau SB-4
- Salmson-Béchereau SB-5
- Salmson-Béchereau SB-6
- Salmson-Béchereau SB-7

=== Salmson-Moineau ===
(France)

- Salmson-Moineau S.M.1 A3
- Salmson-Moineau S.M.2 S2

=== Salvay-Stark ===
(Salvay-Stark Aircraft, Buena Park, CA)

- Salvay-Stark Aircraft Skyhopper I (NB:aerofiles have these as Skyhopper 10 and Skyhopper 11, which is clearly an error caused by mixing Roman and Arabic numerals)
- Salvay-Stark Aircraft Skyhopper II (NB:aerofiles have these as Skyhopper 10 and Skyhopper 11, which is clearly an error caused by mixing Roman and Arabic numerals)

=== Salzman ===
((Joseph R) Salzman Aircraft Services, Detroit Airport, MI)

- Salzman SL-1

=== Sam Aircraft ===
- Sam Aircraft Sam LS

=== Samad ===
- Samad Q-Starling
- Samad eVTOL

=== SAML ===
(Società Aeronautica Meccanica Lombardia, Italy)

- SAML S.1
- SAML S.2

=== Sampson ===
(A M Sampson (also seen as Robert Henderson & Nate Carhart), Wahpeton, ND)

- Sampson B Special MSL-2
- Sampson Wildcat

=== Samson Motorworks ===
(Meadow Vista, CA)

- Samson Switchblade

=== Samu-Geonczy ===
(Béla Samu & Geonczy)

- Samu-Geonczy SG-2 Kek Madar

=== Samu-Orosz-Hatházi ===
(Belá Samu, Jenö Orosz and Dániel Hatházi)

- Samu-Orosz-Hatházi SOH-1

=== SAN ===
(Société Aéronautique Normande, France)

- SAN-B
- SAN 01
- SAN 101
- SAN Jodel D.117
- SAN Jodel D.140 Mousquetaire
- SAN Jodel D.150 Mascaret

=== R,S & Associes SAS Erik Sanstroem ===
(Versailles, Yvelines, France)

- Sanstroem Friendship 3

=== San Francisco ===
(San Francisco, CA)

- San Francisco R-1 a.k.a. Flier

=== San Jose ===
(San Jose Flying Club Ltd, 1232 Martin Ave, San Jose, CA)

- San Jose E

=== Sanchez-Besa ===
(Establissements Louis Clement el Sanchez-Besa)

- Sanchez-Besa Multiplane (1921) single-engine experimental

=== Sanders ===
(C Sanders, Oakland, CA)

- Sanders Curtiss Pursuit

=== Sands ===
(Ron Sands Co, Mertztown, PA)

- Sands Fokker Dr.1 Triplane
- Sands Replica 1929 Primary Glider

=== Sänger ===
(Eugen Sänger)

- Sänger Strato-Gleiter

=== Santa Ana ===
(Santa Ana Aircraft Co, Santa Ana, CA)

- Santa Ana 1925 Biplane
- Santa Ana VM-1

=== Santos-Dumont ===
(Alberto Santos-Dumont, France)

- Santos-Dumont helicopter
- Santos-Dumont 14-bis
- Santos-Dumont 19 Demoiselle
- Santos-Dumont 20 Demoiselle
- Santos-Dumont 21 Demoiselle
- Santos-Dumont 22 Demoiselle

=== São Carlos ===
(Escola de Engenharia de São Carlos(IPAI Aeronautical Division)- São Carlos Engineering School)

- IPAI-26 Tuca
- IPAI-27 Jipe Vaodor
- IPAI-28 Super Surubim
- IPAI-29 Tira Prosa
- IPAI-30

=== São Paulo ===
- São Paulo SP-18 Onça – Jaguar
- São Paulo SP-19 Galinha – Hen
- São Paulo SP-20 Pinto
- São Paulo SP-21 Ganço – Duck

=== Sapphire Aircraft Australia ===
(Fosterville, Victoria, Australia)

- Sapphire Aircraft Australia Sapphire LSA

=== Sarić ===
- Sarić 1
- Sarić 2

=== SATTCo ===
(Service Aviation Training & Transport Co, Wabash, IN)

- SATTCo Commercial

=== Saturn ===
(Saturn Aircraft & Engineering, Oxnard, CA)

- Saturn Taylor Meteor II

=== Saul ===
((W Irving) Saul Aircraft Corp, Carroll, IA)

- Saul Triad 1000

=== Saulnier ===
(Société des Aéroplanes Saulnier, France)

- Saulnier monoplane
- Saulnier monoplane No.2

=== Saunders ===
(S.E Saunders Limited, United Kingdom)

- Saunders Helicogyre
- Saunders T.1
- Saunders Kittiwake
- Saunders A.3 Valkyrie
- Saunders A.4 Medina
- Saunders A.7 Severn
- Saunders A.10 "Multigun" – 1928
- Saunders A.14

=== Saunders Aircraft Company ===
(Canada)

- Saunders ST-27
- Saunders ST-28
- Saunders Cheetah
- Saunders Super Cheetah

=== Saunders-Roe ===
(United Kingdom)

- Saro A.7 Severn
- Saro A.17 Cutty Sark
- Saro A.19 Cloud
- Saro A.21 Windhover
- Saro A.22 Segrave Meteor
- Saro A.24 Mailplane
- Saro A.33
- Saunders-Roe SR.45 Princess
- Saunders-Roe SR.53 – mixed power interceptor
- Saunders-Roe SR.177 – mixed power interceptor (cancelled before completion)
- Saro Lerwick
- Saro London
- Saro-Percival Mailplane
- Saro Shrimp
- Saunders-Roe SR.A/1
- Saro P.531
- Saro W-14 Skeeter

=== Sauper ===
- Sauper J300 Joker
- Sauper Papango

=== Sauser Aircraft Company ===
(Tustin, CA)

- Sauser P6E Replica

=== Sauzeau ===
- Sauzeau Eres-II Coquin Moulins

=== Savary ===
- Savary 1910
- Savary Hydroaéroplane

=== Savyelyev-Zalewski ===
(Vladimir Fedorovich Savyelyev & Władislaw Zalewski)

- S.Z. No.1 (a.k.a. Zalewski W.Z.III)
- S.Z. No.2 (a.k.a. Zalewski W.Z.IV)
- S.Z. No.3 (a.k.a. Zalewski W.Z.V)
- Savelyev No.4
- Savalyev 1916 Quadruplane
- Savalyev 1923 Quadruplane

=== Savoia-Marchetti ===
(SIAI-Marchetti - Société anonyme de construction aéronautique Savoia, Italy)

- Savoia-Marchetti S.51
- Savoia-Marchetti S.52
- Savoia-Marchetti S.55
- Savoia-Marchetti S.56
- Savoia-Marchetti S.57
- Savoia-Marchetti S.58
- Savoia-Marchetti S.59
- Savoia-Marchetti S.62
- Savoia-Marchetti S.64
- Savoia-Marchetti S.65
- Savoia-Marchetti S.66
- Savoia-Marchetti S.67
- Savoia-Marchetti S.71
- Savoia-Marchetti S.72
- Savoia-Marchetti S.73
- Savoia-Marchetti S.74
- Savoia-Marchetti SM.75 Marsupiale
- Savoia-Marchetti SM.76
- Savoia-Marchetti SM.77
- Savoia-Marchetti S.78
- Savoia-Marchetti SM.79 Sparviero
- Savoia-Marchetti SM.80
- Savoia-Marchetti SM.81 Pipistrello
- Savoia-Marchetti SM.82 Canguru
- Savoia-Marchetti SM.83
- Savoia-Marchetti S.84
- Savoia-Marchetti SM.84
- Savoia-Marchetti SM.85
- Savoia-Marchetti SM.86
- Savoia-Marchetti SM.87
- Savoia-Marchetti SM.88
- Savoia-Marchetti SM.89
- Savoia-Marchetti SM.90
- Savoia-Marchetti SM.91
- Savoia-Marchetti SM.92
- Savoia-Marchetti SM.93
- Savoia-Marchetti SM.94( Company drawings)
- Savoia-Marchetti SM.95
- Savoia-Marchetti SM.105

=== Savoia Pomilio ===
(Italy)

- Savoia-Pomilio SP.1
- Savoia-Pomilio SP.2
- Savoia-Pomilio SP.3
- Savoia-Pomilio SP.4

=== Sawyer ===
(Hugh S Sawyer, Milwaukee, WI)

- Sawyer A

=== Sawyer ===
(Ralph V Sawyer, Lancaster, California, United States)

- Sawyer Skyjacker II

=== Saynor & Bell ===
(George Saynor and Robert Bell)

- Saynor & Bell Canadian Club
