= Savoia-Marchetti heavy fighter prototypes =

Savoia-Marchetti heavy fighter prototypes were Italian twin-engined heavy fighter prototypes of World War II. All featured a dual-fuselage structure and used German Daimler-Benz engines.

It may refer to:

- Savoia-Marchetti SM.88
- Savoia-Marchetti SM.91
- Savoia-Marchetti SM.92
