= Joseph Salmon =

Joseph Salmon may refer to:

- Joe Salmon, Irish hurler
- Joseph Salmon (writer), English religious and political writer
- Joseph Salmon (publisher), British bookseller, postcard publisher and printer, the founder of J Salmon Ltd
- Joseph Salmon (discus thrower), Jamaican athlete

== See also ==
- J Salmon Ltd, UK-based printing and publishing firm
