= J300 =

J300 may refer to:

- Aero Synergie J300 Joker, French ultralight aircraft
- Bellanca J-300, high-wing cabin monoplane
- Kawasaki J 300, motorcycle
- SAE J300, engine oil standard
- Toyota Land Cruiser (J300), motor vehicle
