= Papango =

Papango may refer to:

- Aero Synergie Papango, a French ultralight aircraft
- New Zealand scaup, a diving duck, known in the Māori language as the pāpango
