= Kawasaki 340 =

- Type: Two-cylinder two-stroke engine
- National origin: Japan
- Manufacturer: Kawasaki Heavy Industries
- Manufactured: until the early 1980s

The Kawasaki 340 is a Japanese twin-cylinder, in-line, two-stroke engine that was designed for snowmobiles and produced by Kawasaki Heavy Industries until the early 1980s. The engine was available in air-cooled and liquid-cooled versions.

The engine was widely adapted for other purposes, including ultralight aircraft. Kawasaki did not condone or support the use of the engine in aircraft and it was largely supplanted in this role by the similar purpose-designed Rotax 377 aircraft engine.

== Design and development ==
The Kawasaki 340 is very similar in design to the Kawasaki 440, using a smaller piston.

The engine has two cylinders in an in-line configuration. The single ignition system uses a coil and points. Fuel is metered by a carburetor and the engine has oil injection. Starting is by a recoil starter system with electric start as an option.

In its aircraft applications the 340 uses one of several available aftermarket reduction drive systems to reduce the maximum 6800 rpm to a speed more manageable for propeller use.

== Variants ==
340-FA
Free Air-cooled version
340-LC
Liquid-cooled version

== Applications ==
- Fisher Boomerang
- Fly Hard Trikes SkyCycle
- John Deere Trail Fire 340
- Mathews Petit Breezy
- North Wing Maverick
- Pop's Props Cloudster
- Pop's Props Zing
- RagWing RW4 Midwing Sport
- RagWing RW16 Aerial
- Sabre 340
- Sabre Wildcat
- MiniMax 1100r

== Specifications (340-LC) ==
Data from Ragwing Aviation & Kitplanes

=== General characteristics ===
- Type: twin-cylinder, two-stroke engine

=== Components ===
- Fuel system: carburetor
- Oil system: oil injection
- Cooling system: liquid-cooled
- Reduction gear: aftermarket reduction drive for aircraft use

=== Performance ===
- Power output: 35 hp (26 kW) at 6800 rpm

== See also ==
- Hirth F-263
- Hirth 2702
- JPX PUL 425
- Rotax 377

Related development

- Kawasaki 440
