= Sablatnig SF-5 =

SF-5 and SF-6
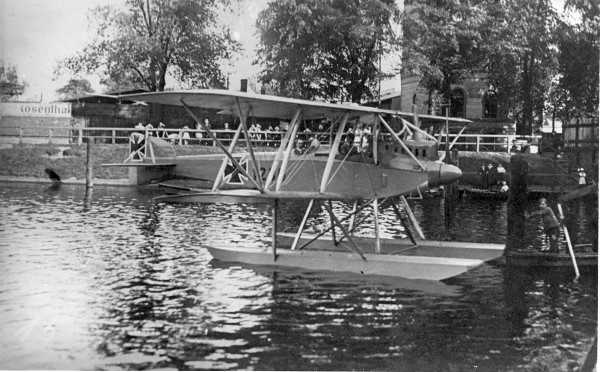

General information
- Type: Reconnaissance seaplane
- National origin: Germany
- Manufacturer: Sablatnig, LFG, LVG
- Primary user: Imperial German Navy
- Number built: 91

History
- First flight: 1917

The Sablatnig SF-5 was a reconnaissance seaplane produced in Germany during the First World War.

== Design and development ==
Designed to meet a specification by the Imperial German Navy for a higher-powered replacement for the Sablatnig SF-2s then in service, the SF-5 was a very similar aircraft other than in its choice of engine. The first batch (serials 968–987) were delivered between January and May 1917, built in the Navy's HFT classification (unarmed reconnaissance aircraft equipped with wireless transmitter and receiver). They were followed by two further batches (1224–1233 and 1352–1371) between July and September. LVG built the type under licence as a trainer aircraft without any radio equipment, delivering 20 aircraft (1017–1036 and 1214–1223) during the second half of 1917. LFG produced the type in the BFT category (unarmed reconnaissance aircraft equipped with wireless transmitter but not receiver), building ten examples (1459–1468) between September 1917 and February 1918. Sablatnig also produced a single BFT-configured aircraft in February 1918.

== Operational history ==
These machines served widely with seaplane stations throughout the North Sea and Baltic Sea. The SF-5 was generally disliked by its aircrews, who dubbed it the "Lame Crow" on account of its poor banking and climbing performance and general sluggishness. Crews found that the supposed cruising speed of production examples was in fact their top speed. Some SF-5s perhaps saw action as bombers against Russian forces, but even those flying reconnaissance missions were easy prey for Russian fighters. At least two SF-5s were captured by the Russians and put to use by them.

A single SF-5 was fitted with wheeled undercarriage salvaged from another aircraft. Designated SF-6 by the factory, and assigned the designation B.I by the Idflieg, it was intended to be a landplane trainer, but was not selected for production.

== Operators ==
Germany

- Imperial German Navy

Turkey

- Ottoman Air Force

== Specifications ==
Data from Kroschel & Stützer 1994, p.156

General characteristics

- Crew: Two, pilot and observer
- Length: 9.60 m (31 ft 6 in)
- Wingspan: 17.30 m (56 ft 9 in)
- Height: 3.55 m (11 ft 8 in)
- Empty weight: 1,052 kg (2,314 lb)
- Gross weight: 1,605 kg (3,531 lb)
- Powerplant: 1 × Benz Bz.III , 110 kW (150 hp)

Performance

- Maximum speed: 145 km/h (93 mph, 81 kn)
- Rate of climb: 1.4 m/s (282 ft/min)
