= Joseph Salmon (publisher) =

British bookseller, publisher and printer

Joseph Salmon ( 20 September 1844 – 9 November 1923) was a British bookseller turned postcard publisher and printer, and the founder of J Salmon Ltd in 1880, the UK's oldest postcard and calendar publisher.

== Early life ==
He was born in the parish of St George in the East, in what is now Stepney, London, the son of Joseph and Maria Salmon. His father was a baker.

== Career ==
In the 1881 census, he was listed as a stationer and printer, with five assistants and two boys working for him. He retired in 1898, and his son, also called Joseph, took over the family business.

== Personal life ==
He was married to Elizabeth Sophia Ashton. In 1881, they were living on the High Street, Sevenoaks, Kent, and in 1891, they were living at 85 London Road, Sevenoaks, with five children and two servants.

- Elizabeth M Salmon (born 1867/68, Hackney, Middlesex)
- Joseph Salmon (born 1868/69, Middlesex)
- Arthur Salmon (born 1871/72, Bloomsbury, Middlesex)
- Edith L Salmon (born 1877/78, Leighton, Essex)
- Percy Salmon (born 1880/81, Leighton, Essex)
- Mabel E Salmon (born 1882/83, Kent)

His son Percy founded the Salmon Motor Company in Burton-on-Trent, which operated from 1912 to 1915, and manufactured the Ace car.
