= Sabre Wildcat =

Wildcat
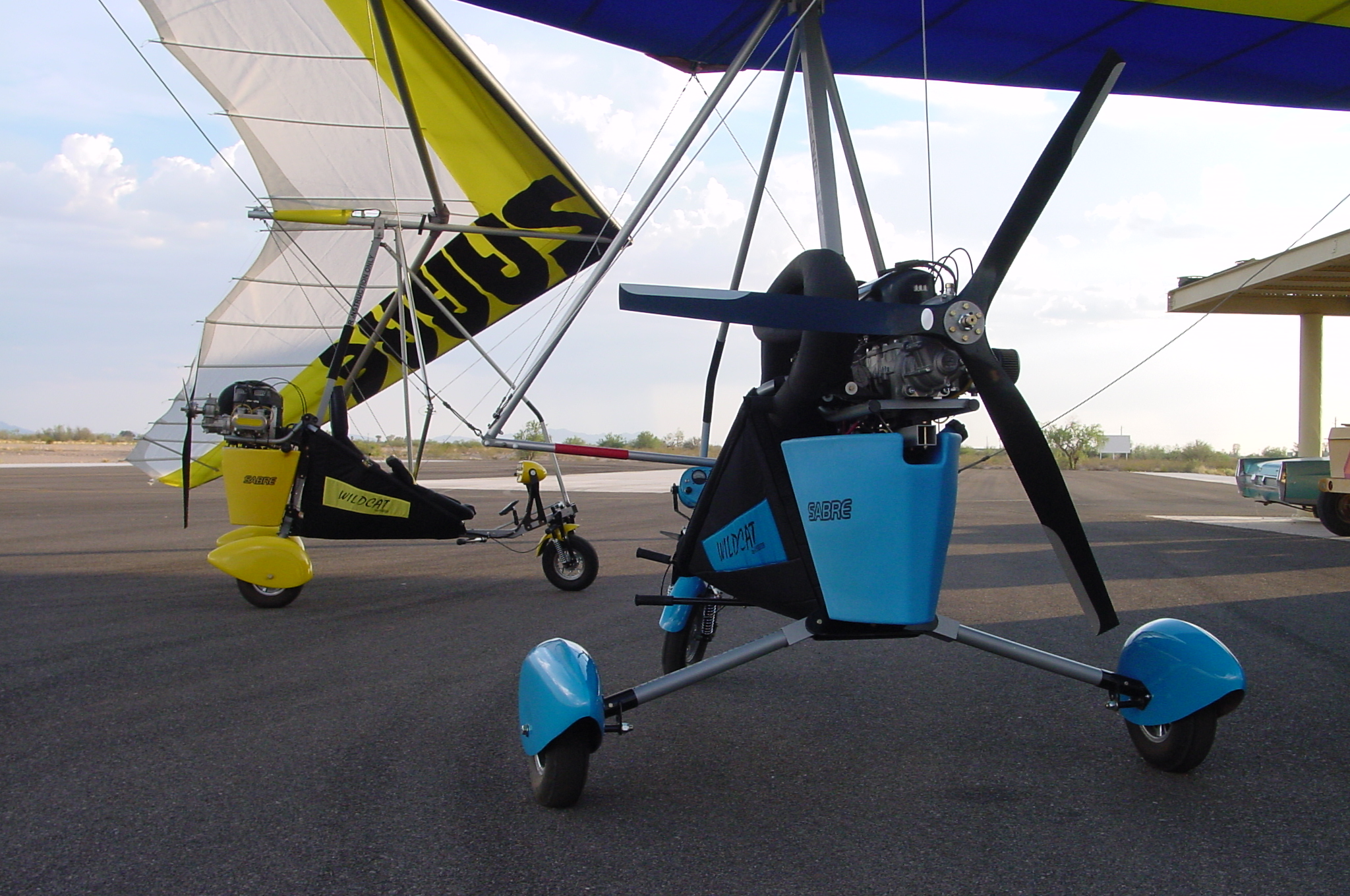

General information
- Type: Ultralight trike
- National origin: United States
- Manufacturer: Sabre Aircraft
- Designer: Richard Helm
- Status: Production completed

The Sabre Wildcat is one of a series of American two-seat ultralight trikes that was designed by Richard Helm and produced by Sabre Aircraft. The aircraft were all supplied complete and ready-to-fly.

Sabre Aircraft ceased operations in 2008.

== Design and development ==
The aircraft features a cable-braced hang glider-style high-wing, weight-shift controls, a two-seats-in-tandem open cockpit, tricycle landing gear and a single engine in pusher configuration. The aircraft is made from tubing, with its double-surface Stream 16 wing covered in Dacron sailcloth. Its 34 ft (10.4 m) span wing is supported by a single tube-type kingpost and uses an "A" frame control bar.

Like the single-seat Sabre 340 the basic models of the two-seater were intended to be economical to purchase. The Elite model cost US$10,800 in 2000, making it the least expensive complete two-seat aircraft available at the time.

== Variants ==
Trike
Initial version, named just the Sabre Trike. Standard engine was the 30 hp (22 kW) Kawasaki 340, with the 40 hp (30 kW) Rotax 447 and 50 hp (37 kW) Rotax 503 optional. Price US$6,995 in 1998.
Aeros 503
Model offered in 2000, with the Aeros Stranger wing and 50 hp (37 kW) Rotax 503 engine. Price US$9,190 in 2000.
Elite
Base model offered circa 2000 with standard 40 hp (30 kW) Rotax 447 two-stroke powerplant or optional 30 hp (22 kW) Kawasaki 340. Optional cockpit fairing, tundra tires and wheel pants.
Venture
Fully equipped model introduced in 2000 with standard 50 hp (37 kW) Rotax 503 two-stroke powerplant and a redesigned titanium carriage frame made in Ukraine. Optional engines include the 64 hp (48 kW) Rotax 582 and the 30 hp (22 kW) Kawasaki 340.
Wildcat
Redesigned two-seat model with standard Zanzottera MZ 202 65 hp (48 kW) engine, Ivoprop propeller, electric starter and saddle bags. Optional engines include the 40 hp (30 kW) Rotax 447, 50 hp (37 kW) Rotax 503 and the 30 hp (22 kW) Kawasaki 340. The wings available included the Sabre single-surface and Puma double-surface wings. Price US$14,995 in 2005.

== Specifications (Wildcat) ==
Data from Kitplanes

General characteristics

- Crew: one
- Capacity: one passenger
- Length: 13 ft (4.0 m)
- Wingspan: 35 ft 6 in (10.82 m)
- Wing area: 177 sq ft (16.4 m^{2})
- Empty weight: 330 lb (150 kg)
- Gross weight: 885 lb (401 kg)
- Fuel capacity: 10 U.S. gallons (38 L; 8.3 imp gal)
- Powerplant: 1 × Zanzottera MZ 202 two-cylinder, two-stroke aircraft engine, 65 hp (48 kW)

Performance

- Maximum speed: 55 mph (89 km/h, 48 kn)
- Cruise speed: 46 mph (74 km/h, 40 kn)
- Stall speed: 21 mph (34 km/h, 18 kn)
- Range: 250 mi (400 km, 220 nmi)
- Rate of climb: 1,200 ft/min (6.1 m/s)
