= Aero Synergie Jodel D20 =

French ultralight aeroplane

Jodel D20
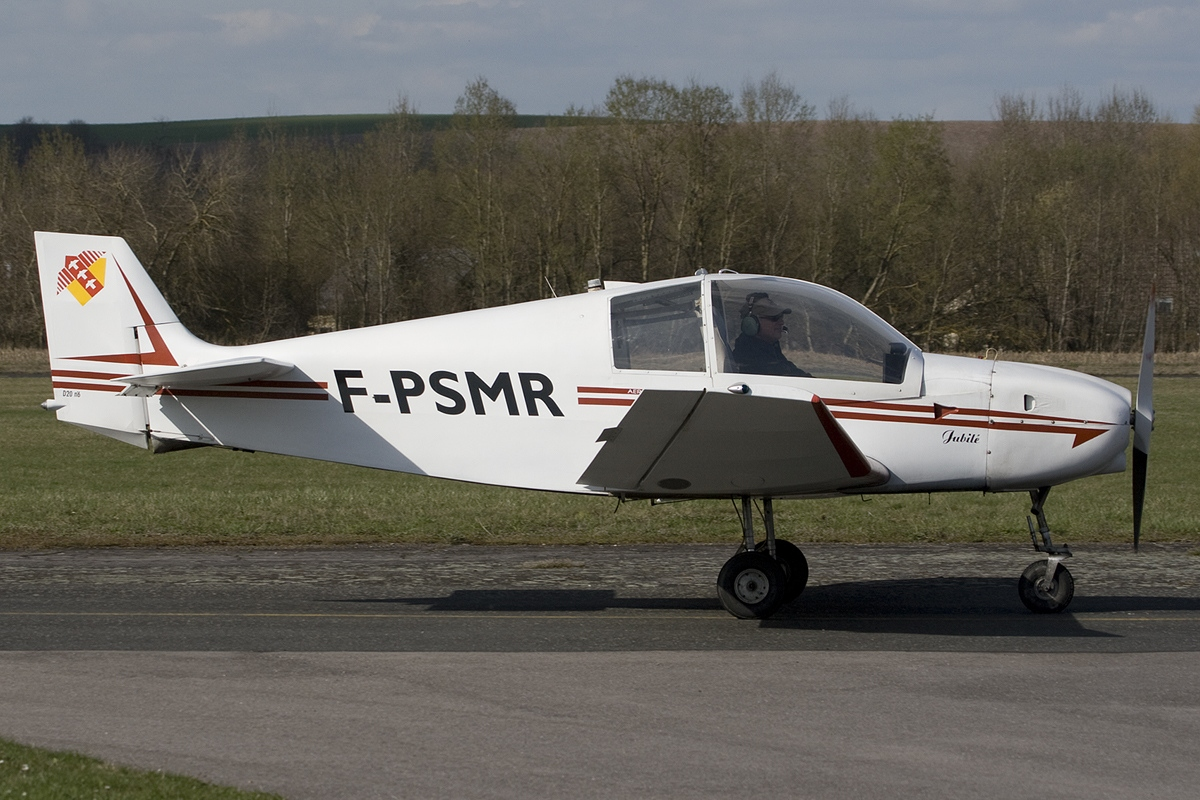

General information
- Type: Ultralight aircraft
- National origin: France
- Manufacturer: Aero Synergie
- Designer: Jean Délémontez
- Status: Production completed

The Aero Synergie Jodel D20 is a French ultralight aircraft that was designed by Jean Délémontez and produced by Aero Synergie of Villefranche-de-Rouergue. The aircraft was supplied as a kit for amateur construction or as a completed aircraft.

Aero Synergie no longer offers the D20.

== Design and development ==
The aircraft complies with the Fédération Aéronautique Internationale microlight rules. It features a cantilever low wing, two seats in a side-by-side configuration enclosed cockpit, a choice of tricycle landing gear or conventional landing gear and a single engine in tractor configuration.

The aircraft has a wooden airframe covered in doped aircraft fabric. Like most Jodel designs its 7.5 m (24.6 ft) span wing employs dihedral in the outer half only. Standard engines used are the 100 hp (75 kW) Rotax 912ULS four-stroke and the 85 hp (63 kW) Jabiru 2200 powerplant. Other engines of similar power output can also be used.

Reviewers Robby Bayerl et al. describe the aircraft as possessing "great performance and impeccable behaviour in flight".

== Specifications (D20) ==
Data from Bayerl

General characteristics

- Crew: one
- Capacity: one passenger
- Wingspan: 7.50 m (24 ft 7 in)
- Wing area: 10.50 m^{2} (113.0 sq ft)
- Empty weight: 265 kg (584 lb)
- Gross weight: 472.5 kg (1,042 lb)
- Fuel capacity: 55 litres (12 imp gal; 15 US gal)
- Powerplant: 1 × Rotax 912ULS four cylinder, liquid and air-cooled, four stroke, 75 kW (101 hp)

Performance

- Maximum speed: 230 km/h (140 mph, 120 kn)
- Cruise speed: 205 km/h (127 mph, 111 kn)
- Stall speed: 65 km/h (40 mph, 35 kn)
- Rate of climb: 4.5 m/s (890 ft/min)
