= Salmson-Béchereau SB-7 =

1920s French fighter aircraft

General information
- Type: Fighter
- National origin: France
- Manufacturer: Salmson
- Designer: Louis Béchereau
- Number built: 1

History
- First flight: 1925
- Developed from: Salmson-Béchereau SB-5

The Salmson-Béchereau SB-7 was a fighter aircraft built by the French company Salmson in the mid-1920s.

== Design ==
The SB-7 was a high-wing monoplane of all-wood construction, with a canvas coating. Only one aircraft was built, and it was intended as a navalized SB-5.

== Specifications ==
Data from

General characteristics

- Crew: Two
- Length: 11.15 m (36 ft 7 in)
- Wingspan: 14.00 m (45 ft 11 in)
- Height: 3.00 m (9 ft 10 in)
- Wing area: 39 m^{2} (420 sq ft)
- Empty weight: 1,600 kg (3,527 lb)
- Powerplant: 1 × Salmson 18Cmb 18 cylinder, air-cooled radial engine, 390 kW (520 hp)
- Propellers: 2-bladed

Performance

- Maximum speed: 200 km/h (120 mph, 110 kn)
