= Aero Synergie =

French aircraft manufacturer

Aero Synergie SARL
- Company type: Limited liability company
- Industry: Aerospace
- Predecessor: Sauper/ALMS
- Founded: November 2009
- Headquarters: Villefrancœur, France
- Products: light aircraft
- Website: www.aerosynergie.fr

Aero Synergie SARL, also called ULM Synergy SARL, is a French aircraft manufacturer based in Villefrancœur. The company specializes in the design and manufacture of light aircraft and kit aircraft.

Formed in November 2009, the company took over the assets of Sauper/ALMS, including its J300 Joker and Papango aircraft designs. These aircraft are now out of production, but Aero Synergie continues to produce parts for the J300. The company produces the Sky Ranger and also acts as distributor for the Zenair line of Canadian light aircraft kits and the ICP Savannah series.

== Aircraft ==
Summary of aircraft built by Aero Synergie
Model name	First flight	Number built	Type
Aero Synergie Jodel D20			light kit aircraft
Aero Synergie J300 Joker			light kit aircraft
Aero Synergie Ninja			light kit aircraft
Aero Synergie Papango			light kit aircraft
Aero Synergie Sky Ranger			light kit aircraft
