= Sablatnig SF-2 =

SF-2
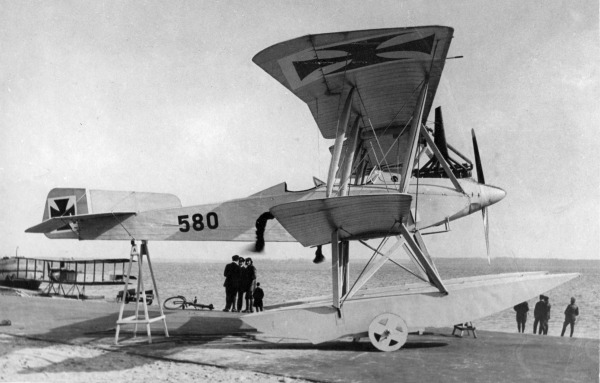

General information
- Type: Reconnaissance seaplane
- National origin: Germany
- Manufacturer: Sablatnig, LFG, LVG
- Primary user: Imperial German Navy
- Number built: 26

History
- First flight: 1916

The Sablatnig SF-2 was a reconnaissance seaplane produced in Germany during the First World War.

== Development ==
A refined version of the Sablatnig SF-1, the SF-2 featured a new empennage and was fitted with a radio transmitter. The prototype (serial 580) had a smaller tail-fin and rudder than the SF-1, but production examples added a large ventral fin. Construction was of wood, skinned in fabric.

== Operational history ==
Sablatnig delivered six aircraft (navy serials 580–585) between June and September 1916. These were followed by ten machines built under licence by LVG (serials 791–800) between October and December, and ten more built by LFG (serials 705–714) between April and May the following year. Although produced as a reconnaissance machine, in practice, they were widely used as trainers.

== Specifications ==
Data from Kroschel & Stützer 1994, p.145

General characteristics

- Crew: Two, pilot and observer
- Length: 9.53 m (31 ft 3 in)
- Wingspan: 18.53 m (60 ft 10 in)
- Height: 4.25 m (13 ft 11 in)
- Empty weight: 1,078 kg (2,372 lb)
- Gross weight: 1,697 kg (3,733 lb)
- Powerplant: 1 × Mercedes D.III , 120 kW (160 hp)

Performance

- Maximum speed: 130 km/h (81 mph, 70 kn)
- Rate of climb: 1.4 m/s (273 ft/min)
