= Sabre Aircraft =

Former American aircraft manufacturer

- Company type: Private company
- Industry: Aerospace
- Founded: 1991
- Defunct: 2008
- Fate: out of business
- Headquarters: Buckeye, Arizona, United States
- Key people: Richard Helm, aircraft designer

Sabre Aircraft was an American aircraft manufacturer, specializing in ultralight trikes and their hang glider-style wings. It was located in Buckeye, Arizona.

In circa 2000 the company was noted for producing the least expensive single and two-seat completed, ready-to-fly aircraft available. By 2000 they had sold more than 200 aircraft. The company claimed that it was the "largest and oldest Trike manufacturer in the United States".

The company wound up operations in 2008, stating on their website "Sabre is no longer in the business of building ultralight trikes. We felt that it was time to move on."

== Aircraft ==
Model name	First flight	Number built	Type
Sabre 340	1991		ultralight trike
Sabre Aeros 503			ultralight trike
Sabre Elite			ultralight trike
Sabre Trike			ultralight trike
Sabre Venture			ultralight trike
Sabre Wildcat			ultralight trike

== Gallery ==
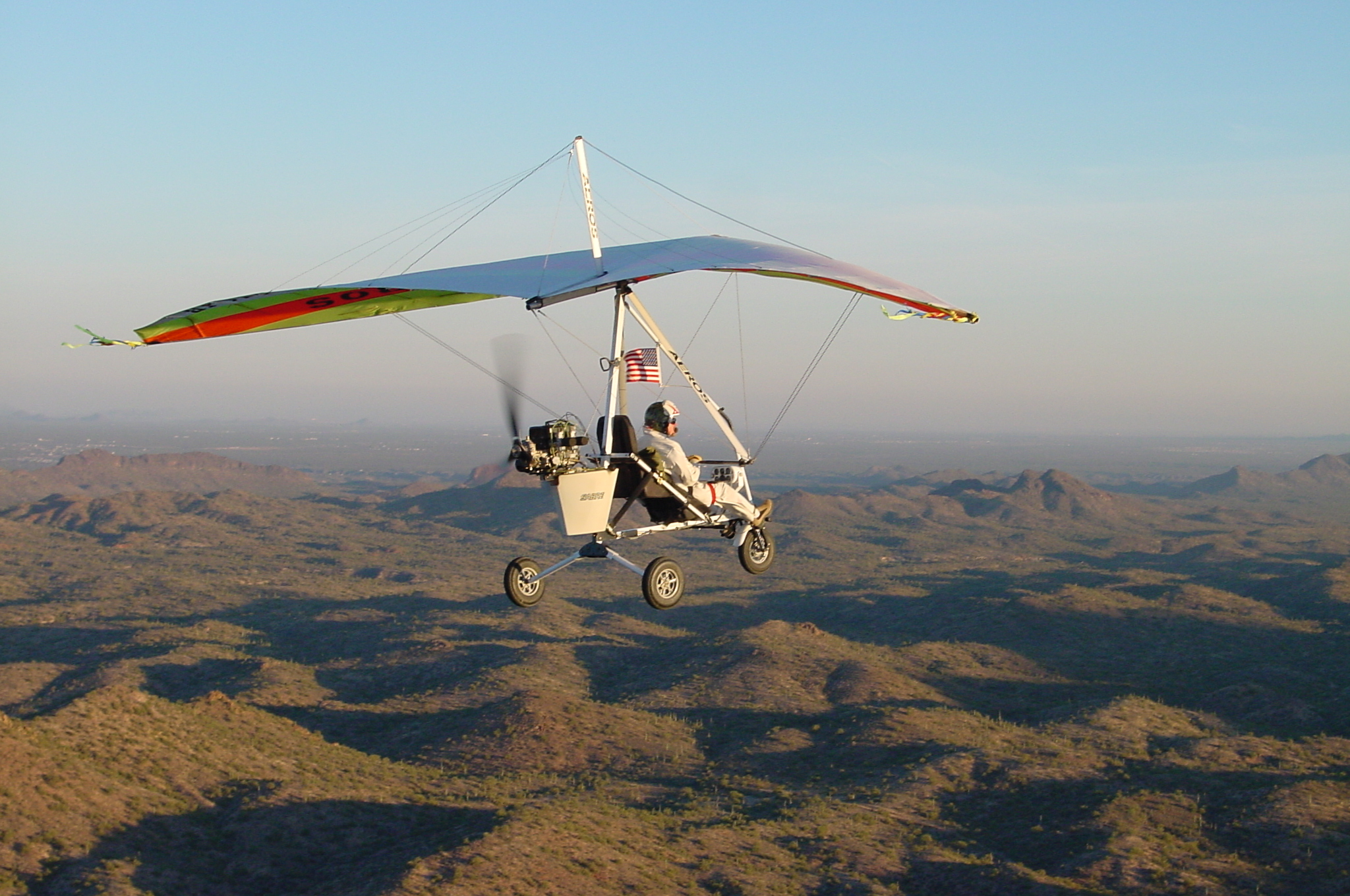
Sabre Aeros 503

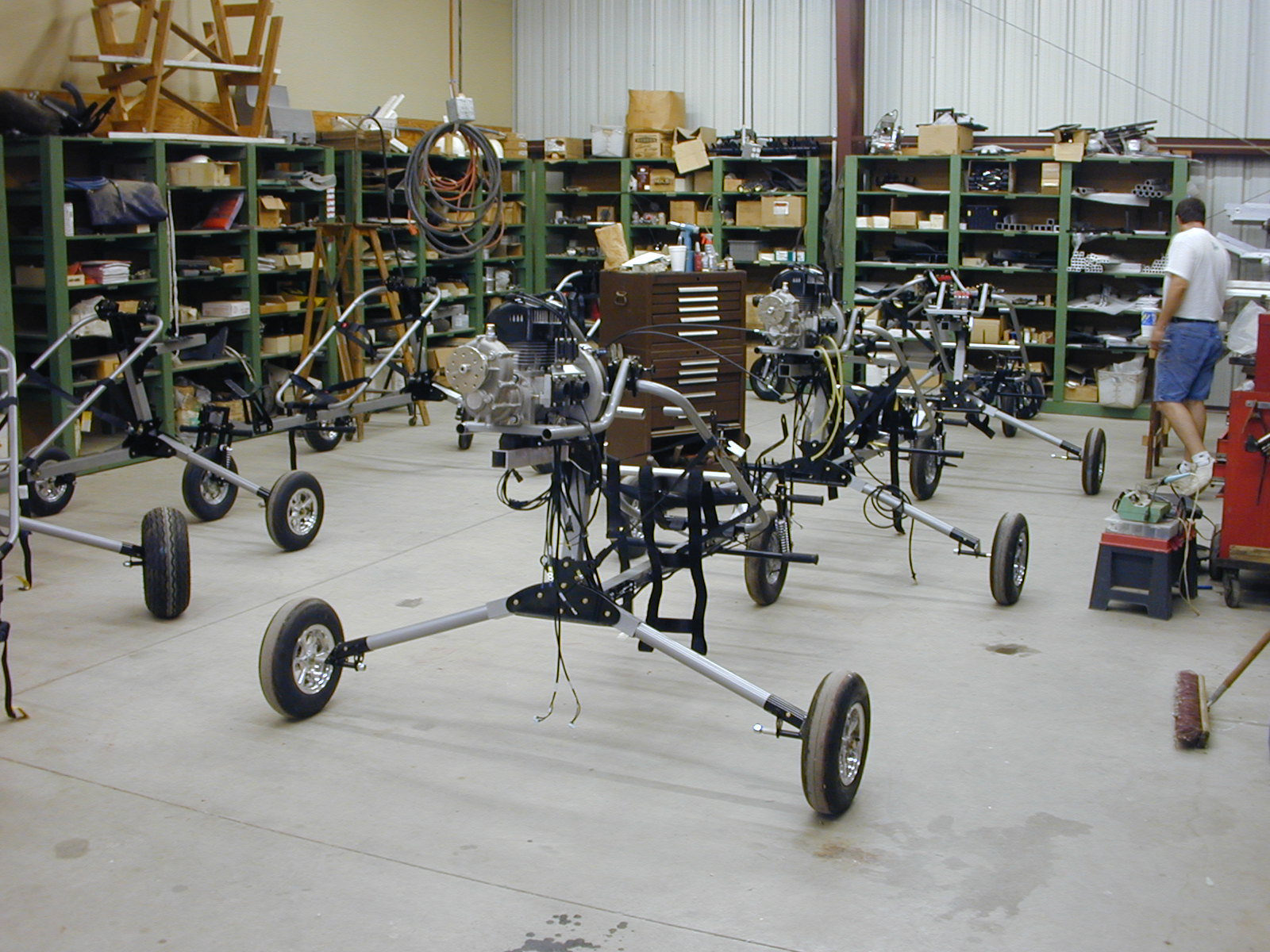
Sabre Assembly

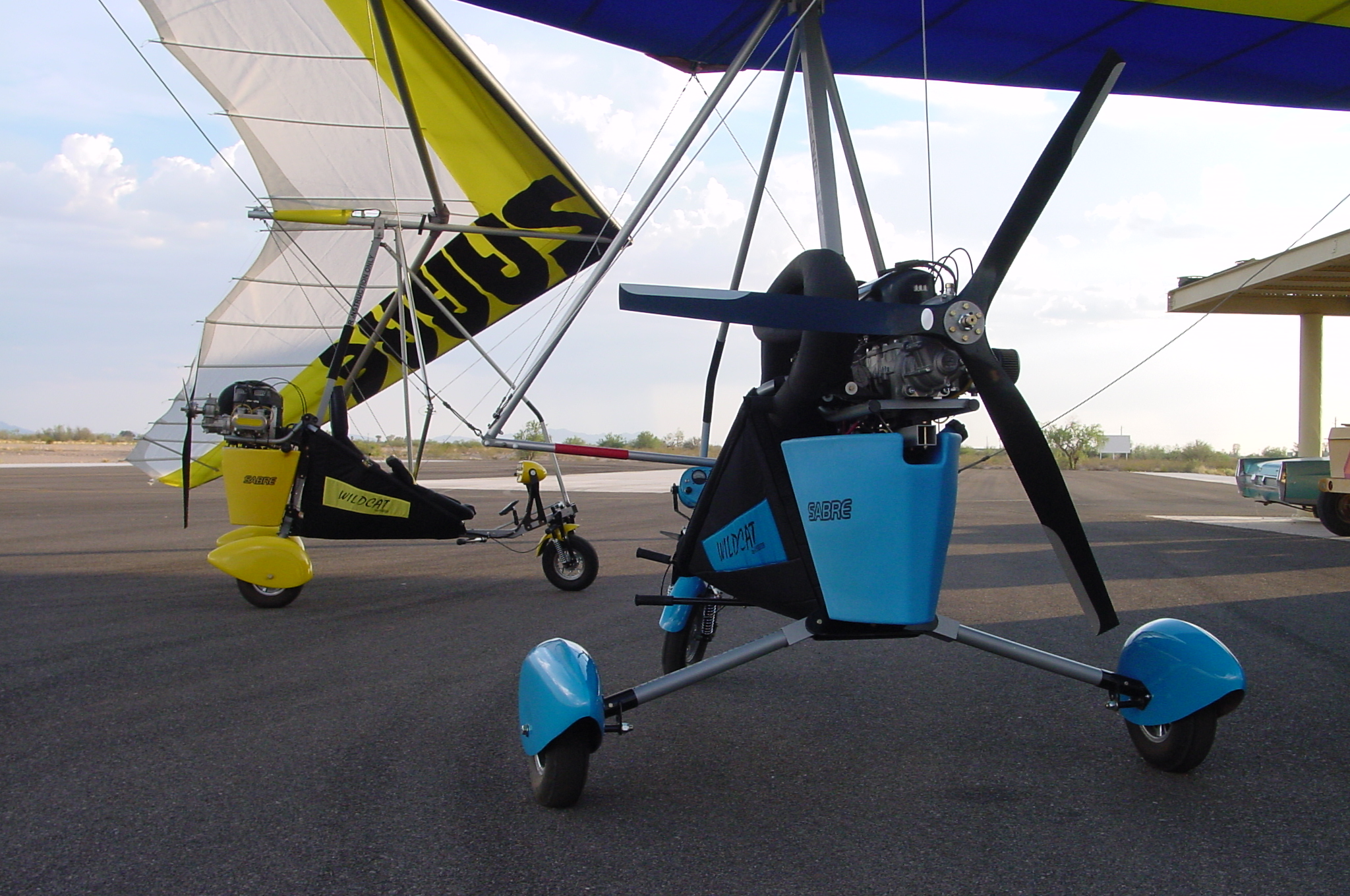
Sabre Wildcat

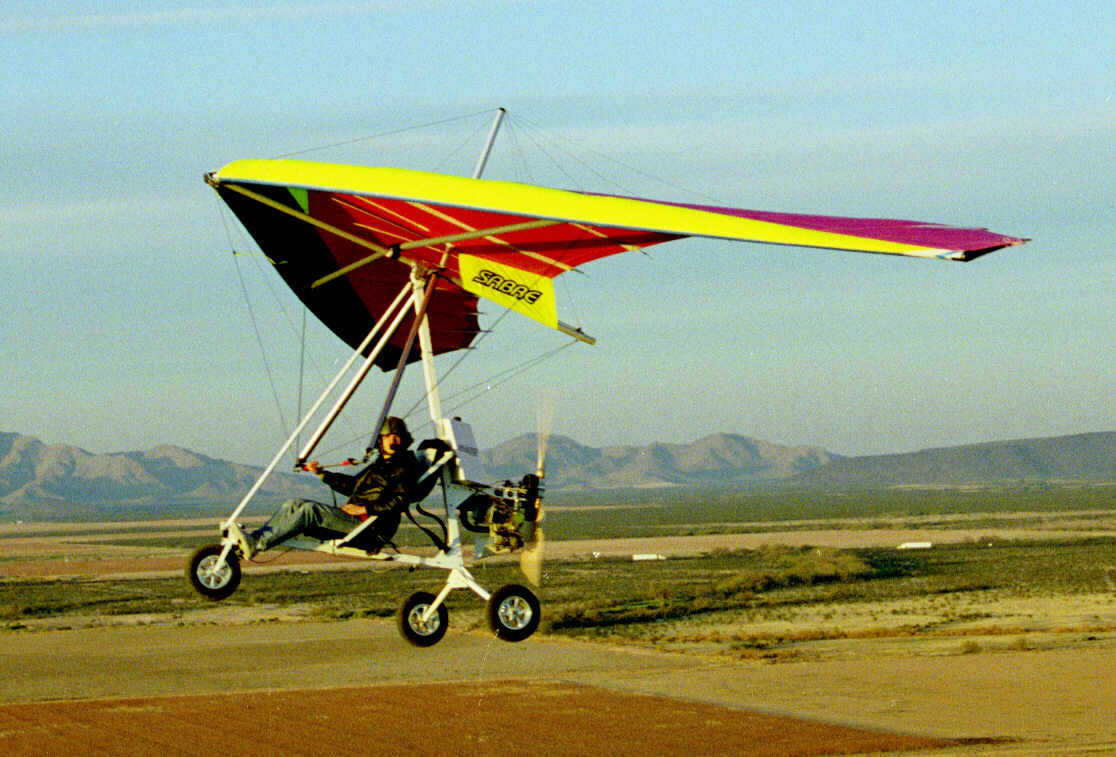
Original Sabre 340

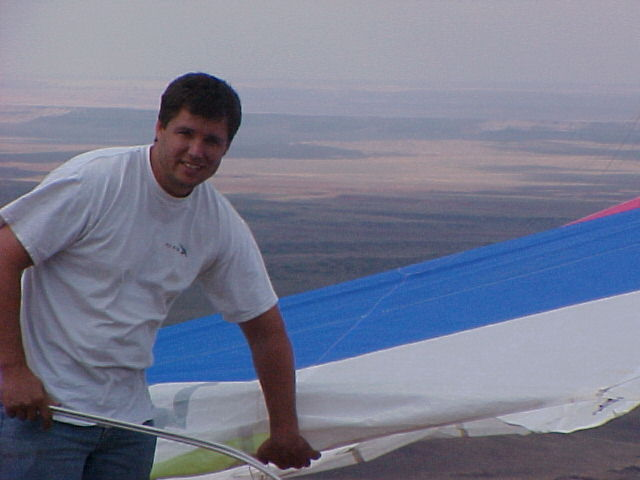
Designer Richard A. Helm
