= SAIMAN LB.2 =

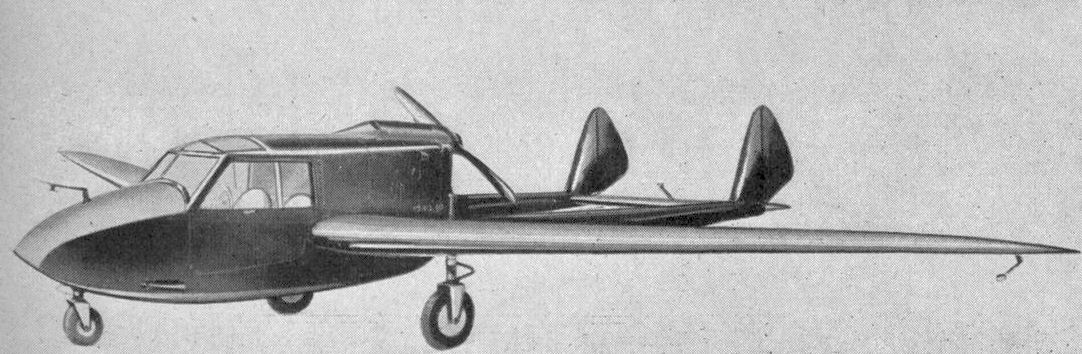

General information
- Type: Two seat light aircraft
- National origin: Italy
- Manufacturer: Societa Anonima Industrie Meccaniche Aeronautiche Navali SAIMAN
- Designer: Francis Lombardi

History
- First flight: c.1937

The SAIMAN LB.2 was an unconventional Italian two seat cabin side by side sport aircraft designed around 1937, with a single pusher configuration engine, twin tail booms and an early tricycle undercarriage.

== Design and development ==
As well as its own designs like the SAIMAN 202 cabin monoplane, SAIMAN also constructed other peoples' aircraft. The LB.2 was one of the latter, designed by Francis Lombardi who was well known for his Avia FL.3 trainer aircraft.

The unusually laid out LB.2 was largely of conventional wooden construction. It was a cantilever mid-wing monoplane, with a three section wing consisting of a centre section and two outer panels. The wing's wooden structure was plywood covered at the leading edge and fabric covered aft. Slotted flaps were fitted. Two parallel, rectangular section tail booms, mounted at the wing centre section-outer panel junctions, carried the empennage. Like the wings, the tail surfaces had wooden structures and were plywood and fabric covered. The tailplane and elevator was of constant chord and did not extend beyond the fins, which had swept, straight leading edges and carried curved rudders, cut away below.

The central nacelle of the LB.2 placed the seating well ahead of the wing leading edge and the engine at the trailing edge. It was a flat sided structure of mixed construction, with plywood covering around the nose and cabin and metal around the engine. Seating was enclosed, with access via fuselage side doors. The flat cabin top continued behind the cabin to the engine housing, where an 82 kW (110 hp) Alfa-Romeo 110-I 4-cylinder inverted air-cooled in-line engine was mounted in pusher configuration.

The LB.2 was one of the first Italian aircraft with a tricycle undercarriage. This was non-retractable, with the mainwheels on short vertical oleo legs wing mounted at the root of the tailbooms. The nosewheel was steerable.

== Operational history ==
The SAIMAN LB.2 appeared at the Milan show of 1937, though Flight dismissed it as a "freak". Jane's All the World's Aircraft 1938 described it as "now built under licence by SAIMAN" but it is not certain that more than the prototype was constructed.

== Specifications ==
Data from Jane's All the World's Aircraft 1938

General characteristics

- Capacity: 2
- Length: 6.9 m (22 ft 8 in)
- Wingspan: 11.7 m (38 ft 5 in)
- Height: 1.85 m (6 ft 1 in)
- Wing area: 15.16 m^{2} (163.2 sq ft)
- Empty weight: 620 kg (1,367 lb)
- Gross weight: 900 kg (1,984 lb)
- Powerplant: 1 × Alfa-Romeo 110-I 4-cylinder inverted in-line water-cooled, 82 kW (110 hp)
- Propellers: 2-bladed

Performance

- Maximum speed: 210 km/h (130 mph, 110 kn)
- Cruise speed: 190 km/h (120 mph, 100 kn)
- Range: 500 km (310 mi, 270 nmi)
- Service ceiling: 5,500 m (18,000 ft)
- Wing loading: 59 kg/m^{2} (12 lb/sq ft)
- Power/mass: 0.091 kW/kg (0.059 hp/lb)
- Landing speed: 70 km/h (44 mph; 38 kn)
