= Salmson-Béchereau SB-2 =

Trainer aircraft built by Salmson

General information
- Type: Two seat trainer aircraft
- National origin: France
- Manufacturer: Salmson
- Designer: Louis Béchereau
- Number built: 1

History
- First flight: 1923
- Variant: Salmson-Béchereau SB-3

The Salmson-Béchereau SB-2 was a trainer aircraft built by the French company Salmson.

The SB-2 was basically a mid-wing monoplane design. Only one aircraft was built.

== Specifications ==
Data from

General characteristics

- Crew: One
- Length: 6.03 m (19 ft 9 in)
- Wingspan: 7.0 m (23 ft 0 in)
- Height: 2.14 m (7 ft 0 in)
- Wing area: 11 m^{2} (120 sq ft)
- Empty weight: 622 kg (1,371 lb)
- Powerplant: 1 × Salmson 9Ac 9 cylinder, water-cooled radial engine, 89 kW (120 hp)
- Propellers: 2-bladed

Performance

- Maximum speed: 220 km/h (140 mph, 120 kn)
