= Salmson-Béchereau SB-3 =

General information
- Type: Racing aircraft
- National origin: France
- Manufacturer: Salmson
- Designer: Louis Béchereau
- Number built: 3

History
- First flight: 1924
- Developed from: Salmson-Béchereau SB-2

The Salmson-Béchereau SB-3 was a racing aircraft built by French company Salmson.

== Design ==
The SB-3 was based on the SB-2 training aircraft and differed in having a huge nose and rather stocky or pot-bellied outlines. The wing was supported by Y-shaped struts, which rested on the oil-pneumatic shock absorbers of the chassis designed by Louis Béchero (Louis Bechereau), a patent for which he received on July 6, 1922 (No.553710). The mechanism was also equipped with cushion cords hidden in these struts.

The SB 3bis had a wingspan of 10 m and a larger wing area (19 m²). The center of gravity of the aircraft was located at 35% of the wing chord length. However, the resistance caused by the thick struts of the first configuration, led Beshero to the need to install braces on the SB 3bis above and below the wing. The motor placed in the center of gravity set in motion a four-bladed screw formed by the intersection of two two-bladed screws mounted relative to each other at an angle of 90 degrees and with a shift in length of 60 cm. However, these displacements relative to the axis resulted in vibrations; to fix this in the gap between the screw and the engine a flat cylindrical screen was placed. The sides of this deformable thin sheet absorbed the spontaneous movements of the screws.

== Racing contests ==
According to the Rules of the race were supposed to be international, the cup was played in France during two competitions, each of which consisted of a flight at maximum speed at a distance of 300 kilometers. The winner received a prize of 200,000 francs, which was to be divided into two parts, 25,000 francs each (the first was intended for the pilot, and the second for the manufacturer of the aircraft, which showed the best speed in both flights) and two annual awards of 75,000 francs. The races in Istra took place on June 23, 1924, on a circular route 50 kilometers long, whose starting point was the center of military aviation (Center d'Aviation militaire).

At the end of May 1924, Beshero had not yet found a pilot for the SB 3bis. Thanks to the assistance of the Assistant Secretary of State for Aeronautics (sous-secrétaire d'Etat à l'Aéronautique), a volunteer was found - Lieutenant Georges Férigoule, who was directly in Istra at that time. After the test flight, Ferigul discovered a rather limited lateral control, but admitted that the aircraft had some interesting features. The only drawback was the completely insufficient cooling of the "forced" engine, which developed on takeoff 800 hp. To solve this serious problem, Salmson has installed a new pump to speed up the passage of water in the radiators. But during the flight, thin radiator strips were crushed by a too powerful pump. A tank with cooling engine water, placed in an L-shaped fairing in front of the pilot, depressurized and burned Ferigulu’s face. Fortunately, his eyes were protected by flying glasses ... Forced to land. the pilot refused to prolong the competition, which was won by Sadi Lecuant (Sadi Lecointe) on the Nieuport 29, equipped with a 450-horsepower V-shaped Hispano engine. The Sadi Lekuant airplane covered a distance of 300 kilometers in 57 minutes 50 seconds with an average speed of 31.239 km / h. Thus, the premium of 75,000 francs was issued by Société Nieuport-Astra.

== Specifications ==
Data from

General characteristics

- Crew: One
- Length: 8.10 m (26 ft 7 in)
- Wingspan: 10.00 m (32 ft 10 in)
- Height: 2.50 m (8 ft 2 in)
- Wing area: 19 m^{2} (200 sq ft)
- Empty weight: 1,400 kg (3,086 lb)
- Gross weight: 1,620 kg (3,571 lb)
- Powerplant: 1 × Salmson 18CMb 18 cylinder, water-cooled radial engine, 390 kW (520 hp)
- Propellers: 2-bladed

Performance

- Maximum speed: 320 km/h (200 mph, 170 kn)
- Range: 350 km (220 mi, 190 nmi)

== Bibliography ==
- Cortet, Pierre (March 2002). "Le monoplan de course Salmson-Béchereau SB3" [The Racing Monoplane Salmson-Béchereau SB3]. Avions: Toute l'Aéronautique et son histoire (in French) (108): 15–17. ISSN 1243-8650.
