= Sablatnig =

German aircraft manufacturer and airline

Sablatnig Flugzeugbau GmbH, Sablatnig Commercial Aeroplane, Sablatnig-Eindecker
- Industry: Aircraft production
- Founded: October 1915
- Key people: Dr Josef Sablatnig

Sablatnig was a German aircraft manufacturer and airline. After the conclusion of World War I, in August 1919 Sablatnig offered government subsidised services between Berlin and Bremen using its Sablatnig P.III commercial airliners in conjunction with Norddeutscher Lloyd.

== Aircraft ==
Summary of aircraft built by Sablatnig
| Model name | First flight | Number built | Type |
|---|---|---|---|
| Sablatnig SF-1 | 1915 | 1 | Navy Recon |
| Sablatnig SF-2 | 1916 | 26 | Recon |
| Sablatnig SF-5 | 1917 | 91 | Recon |
| Sablatnig SF-8 | 1918 | 3 | Recon |
| Sablatnig C.I | 1917 | 2 | Recon |
| Sablatnig N.I | 1918 | 1 | Bomber |
| Sablatnig P.III | 1919 | 40 | Commercial airplane |
