= SABCA Demonty-Poncelet limousine =

limousine
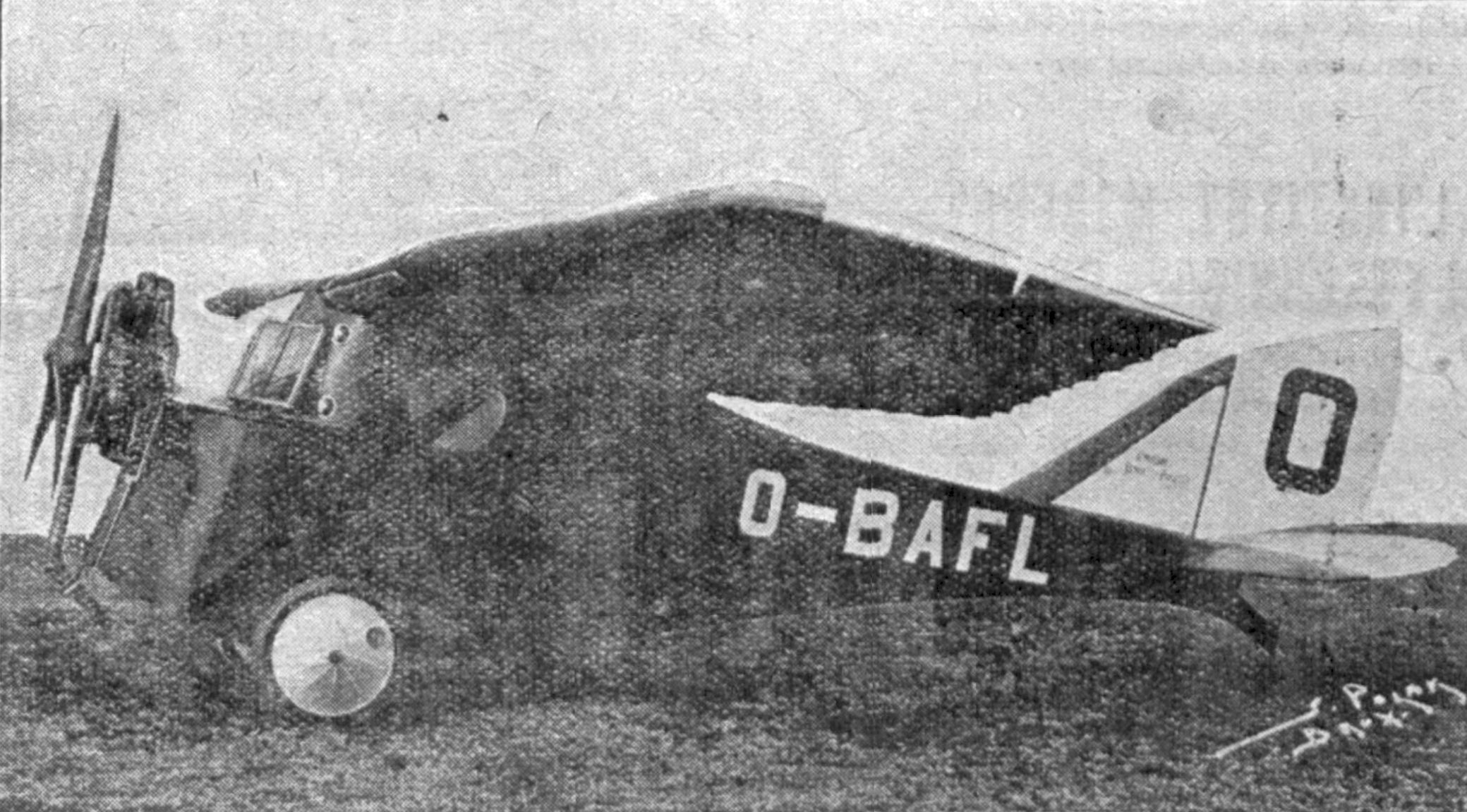

General information
- Type: Two seat touring aircraft
- National origin: Belgium
- Manufacturer: SABCA
- Designer: Mathieu Demonty and Paul Poncelet

History
- First flight: before mid-June 1924

The SABCA Demonty-Poncelet monoplane, Demonty-Poncelet limousine or SABCA-DP was a Belgian light aircraft first flown in 1924. It had two comfortable side-by side seats in a glazed cabin. Though it had competition successes in 1924 and 1925, it did not go into production.

== Design and development ==
The limousine, not an official name but that used by contemporaries who described it as a limousine de tourisme, was designed and built by Mathieu Demonty and Paul Poncelet of the Société Anonyme Belge de Constructions Aéronautiques. Demonty did the overall design and calculations and Poncelet the detailed design and all the construction.

It was an all-wood aircraft with a high, two-part, braced wing. The leading edge of each half-wing was straight and unswept over the inner half of the span where the chord increased outwards from the root, but the outer section was straight-tapered to squared tips. Each was built around two spars, with the leading edge plywood-covered to form a box girder with the forward spar. Aft, the wing was fabric covered. The outer wing sections carried ailerons, hinged obliquely so their chord increased strongly outwards. The wings were attached to the top of the fuselage and braced to the lower fuselage with streamlined, inverted V-struts to the spars 2.0 m (6 ft 7 in) from the fuselage sides. Folding the wings around a joint at the forward spar root for transport or storage reduced the width to 2.39 m (7 ft 10 in) and took less than five minutes.

The limousine was originally powered by a 32 kW (43 hp) four-cylinder, inverted, water-cooled engine, produced in 1913 by Grégoire, which drove a three-bladed propeller; both the propeller and the inverted engine were unusual at the time, though Grégoire had used this engine arrangement in his 1910 monoplane. The engine was cooled with a cylindrical Lamblin radiator mounted above the central wing, where the fuel tank was located. Behind the engine, its upper parts under a narrow cowling, the mahogany plywood-covered, elm-framed fuselage was rectangular in section but tadpole-shaped in profile, deep below the wing but slender aft. It also slimmed aft in plan, though not so strongly. Its enclosed, spacious cabin, which seated pilot and passenger side-by-side, was below the wing with Cellon windows angled to the line of flight on each side of the cowling, aided by side and roof windows. It also provided a space for baggage and for tools. There was a port side door for access.

The limousine had a conventionally laid out empennage. It had no fixed tailplane but its balanced elevator, with a slightly swept leading edge and almost semi-circular, fabric-covered rear, was hinged at the extreme tail. The fin, built integral to the fuselage, was triangular and the fabric-covered rudder was rhomboidal, leaving a space below for elevator movement.

Its landing gear was conventional, with its mainwheels on steel half-axles centrally hinged within the fuselage at its deepest part and with rubber shock absorbers on the fuselage underside, giving a track of 1.55 m (5 ft 1 in). A sprung tailskid was mounted on an extension of the rear fuselage.

== Operational history ==
The date of the limousine's first flight is not known but it was active by mid-June 1924, when it stood out at a Belgian event for touring aircraft. Piloted by V. Simonet, it gained second place overall. At the beginning of July it was one of thirteen small aircraft entered for the Tour de France des avionettes. Piloted by van Opstal, it was forced to withdraw on the Belgian leg when part of the cowling came away and destroyed the propeller.

By the summer of 1925 the limousine had been re-engined with a 37 kW (50 hp) Anzani six-cylinder air-cooled radial engine. It flew with this at the Vauville meeting for gliders and small aircraft and won first place overall in the latter category. It remained active at meetings until at least 1928, when it was a contestant at Reims.

The name Cyrano, sometimes added to the makers name, was specific to the first aircraft, registered O-BAFL, which remained on the Belgian register until 1930. There may have been a second example; O-BAFV appeared in the register in 1926 as a SABCA Demonty-Poncelet 1 but, in the absence of photographs or definite contemporary comments on a second limousine, its type remains uncertain. Its registration was cancelled in 1933.

== Specifications (Grégoire engine) ==
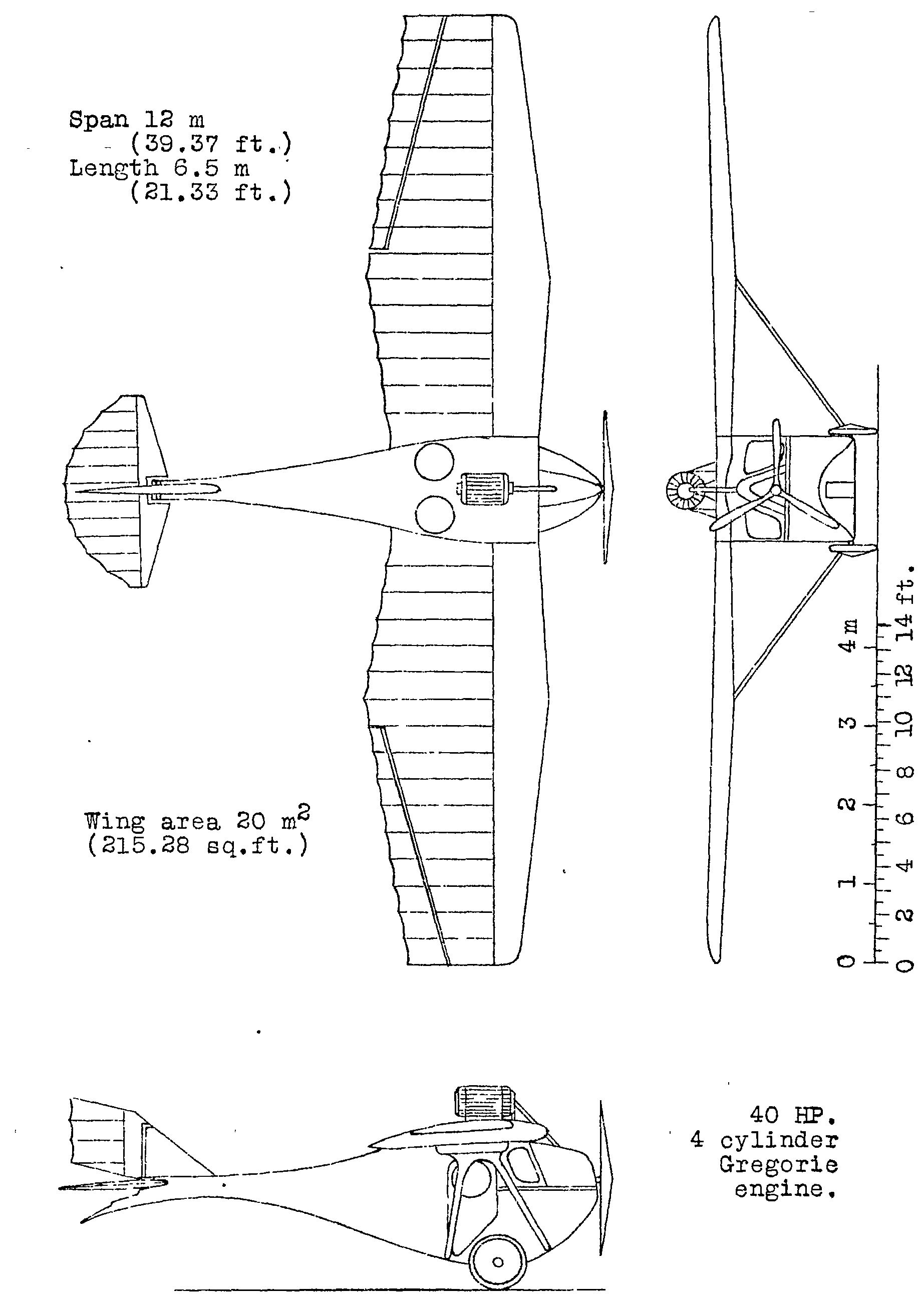
SABCA Demonty-Poncelet limousine 3-view drawing from NACA-TM-301

Data from Flight, July 1924

General characteristics

- Crew: One
- Capacity: one passenger
- Length: 6.50 m (21 ft 4 in)
- Wingspan: 12.0 m (39 ft 4 in)
- Height: 2.55 m (8 ft 4 in)
- Wing area: 18 m^{2} (190 sq ft)
- Empty weight: 330 kg (728 lb) without fuel
- Gross weight: 520 kg (1,146 lb)
- Fuel capacity: 40 kg (88 lb)
- Powerplant: 1 × Grégoire 4-cylinder inverted, water-cooled, 32 kW (43 hp) at 1,240 rpm
- Propellers: 3-bladed wooden

Performance

- Maximum speed: 125 km/h (78 mph, 67 kn)
- Landing speed: 50 km/h (31 mph; 27 kn)
