= Savary 1910 biplane =

1910s French aircraft

General information
- Type: Sports aircraft
- National origin: France
- Designer: Robert Savary
- Number built: 1

History
- Introduction date: 1910

The Savary 1910 biplane was a French sports aircraft built in the early 1910s.

== Specifications ==
Data from

General characteristics

- Crew: 2
- Length: 9.00 m (29 ft 6 in)
- Wingspan: 8.50 m (27 ft 11 in)
- Wing area: 30.00 m^{2} (322.9 sq ft)
- Powerplant: 1 × ENV Type A V-8 water-cooled piston engine, 45 kW (60 hp)
- Propellers: 2-bladed fixed-pitch propeller

Performance

== Bibliography ==
- Kurc, Alain (March 2000). "Robert Savary, un constructeur français de province" [Robert Savary, a French Provincial Builder]. Avions: Toute l'Aéronautique et son histoire (in French) (84): 42–49. ISSN 1243-8650.
- Kurc, Alain (April 2000). "Robert Savary, un constructeur français de province". Avions: Toute l'Aéronautique et son histoire (in French) (84): 51–58. ISSN 1243-8650.
- Opdycke, Leonard E. (1999). French Aeroplanes before the Great War. Atglen, Pennsylvania: Schiffer Publishing. ISBN 0-7643-0752-5.
