= Kawasaki J 300 =

- Manufacturer: Kawasaki Motorcycles
- Parent company: Kawasaki Heavy Industries
- Engine: Single Cylinder
- Top speed: 90 mph/145 km/h
- Power: 20 kW
- Torque: 21 ft-lb
- Seat height: 775 mm
- Weight: 191 kg (dry)
- Fuel capacity: 13 liters
- Oil capacity: 1.3 litres
- Fuel consumption: 59 mpg

The Kawasaki J 300 is a mid-sized scooter produced by Kawasaki Motorcycles. The Kawasaki J 300 was first produced in 2014.

== Specifications ==
The Kawasaki J 300 has a single cylinder engine that has a power output of 20 kW and a torque output of 21 ft-lb. The motorcycle has a top speed of around 90 miles per hour and a horsepower of approximately 27 bhp. The Kawasaki J 300 weighs about 191 kilograms and has a seat height of 775 mm, it is a middleweight motorcycle. The fuel tank has a capacity of 13 liters and has a fuel consumption rate of 59 mpg.
