= Saab 107 =

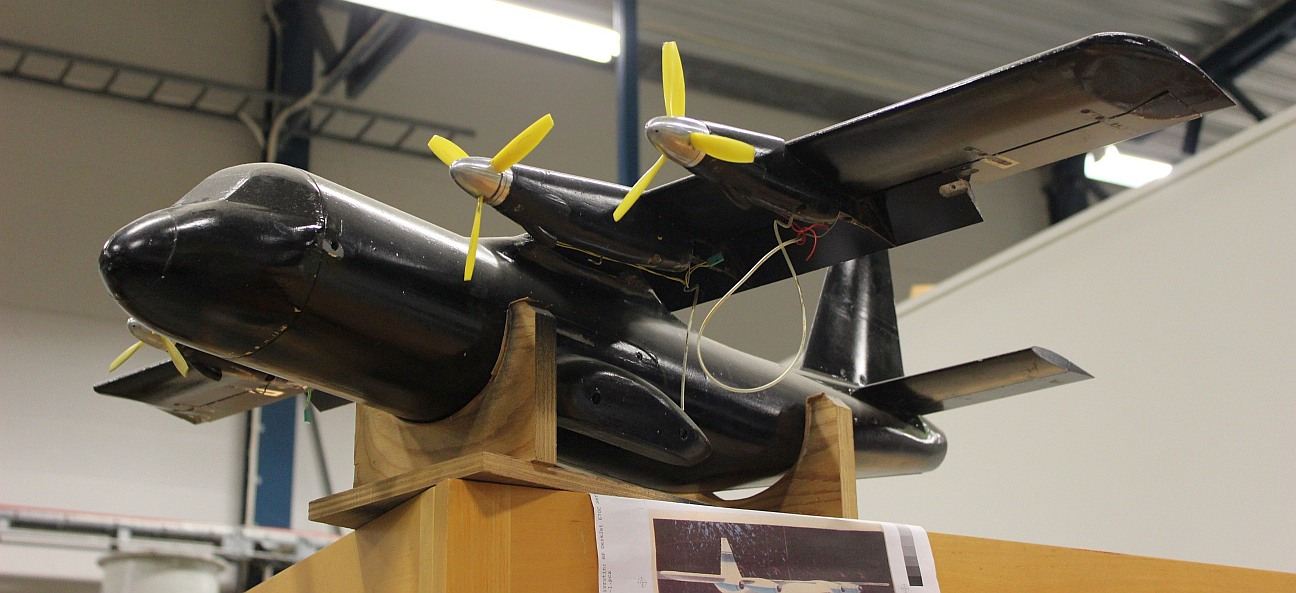
- Wind tunnel model of the Saab 1071 on display at Arlanda Flygsamlingar.

General information
- Type: Short-distance feederliner project
- National origin: Sweden
- Manufacturer: Saab AB
- Status: Cancelled
- Number built: None

The Saab 107 was a proposed series of small airliners that were intended to be manufactured by Saab AB of Sweden, but were never built.

== Development ==
Two variants of a feederliner project were under development at Svenska Aeroplan AB from 1966 to 1968 with a projected first date of operation in 1973, the Saab 1071 and the Saab 1073. The design goals for both designs were minimization of turnaround time at an airport as well as production and operation costs. Following an intensive market research Saab wanted to compete with terrestrial transport in both aspects. A model of the 1071 was presented at the Hannover air show in April 1968 and model photos as well as illustrations of both projects appeared in the specialized press at about the same time. Saab needed foreign partners to share the development costs, and as none were forthcoming, Project 10 was abandoned.

== Design ==
The Saab 1071 was projected for very short distances between small domestic airfields and international hub airports. The design featured a high wing with rectangular plan form, a circular pressurized fuselage for 40 passengers and four turboprop engines in the 800 h.p. class. Development costs were estimated at 100 million SEK and the final unit sales costs at maximal 5 million SEK. Wings and fuselage were designed to be easily stretchable at low development costs if needed later on. The wing was equipped with simple, single-pivoted slot flaps to obtain high lift for short take offs within 800 m runway. Propeller thrust reversal was intended to be used for reduction of the landing distance.

The second project Saab 1073 was intended for passenger and freight transport on somewhat longer domestic lines between airports that offer runways of 1200 m length or more. For this, the STOL requirement was less severe and for a better cruising economy the design featured two turbofans in nacelles under the high wing which had a moderate wing sweep. The T-tail kept the elevator out of the exhaust jets. The intended turbofans were in the 10,000 lb-thrust class (Rolls-Royce Trent) and the passenger capacity amounted to 80. Development costs were estimated at 300 million SEK and the final sales price at maximal 15 million SEK. Realization of this project would have needed public support as well as cooperation with a large foreign aircraft manufacturer.

== Specifications (Model 1071) ==
Data from Interavia 2/1968 pp. 199-200

General characteristics

- Capacity: 40
- Length: 18.0 m (59 ft 1 in)
- Wingspan: 22.5 m (73 ft 10 in)
- Height: 6.3 m (20 ft 8 in)
- Empty weight: 7,500–8,500 kg (16,535–18,739 lb)
- Max takeoff weight: 13,000–14,000 kg (28,660–30,865 lb)

Performance

- Cruise speed: 400 km/h (250 mph, 220 kn)
- Range: 2,000 km (1,200 mi, 1,100 nmi)

== Specifications (Model 1073) ==
Data from Interavia 2/1968 pp. 199-200

General characteristics

- Capacity: 80 passengers
- Empty weight: 15,000 kg (33,069 lb)
- Max takeoff weight: 27,000 kg (59,525 lb)

Performance

- Cruise speed: 700–800 km/h (430–500 mph, 380–430 kn)
- Range: 2,600 km (1,600 mi, 1,400 nmi)
