= Sablatnig SF-8 =

SF-8
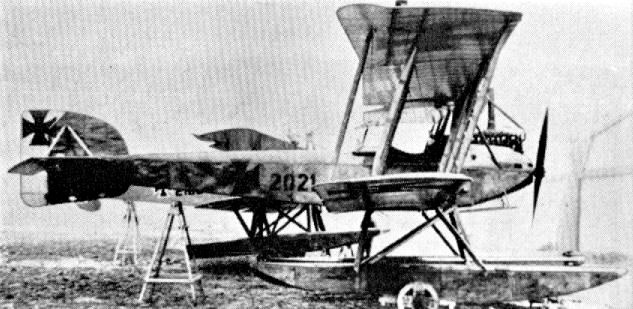

General information
- Type: Seaplane trainer
- National origin: Germany
- Manufacturer: Sablatnig
- Primary user: Imperial German Navy
- Number built: At least 3 (out of 33 ordered)

History
- First flight: 1918

The Sablatnig SF-8 was a training seaplane produced in Germany during the First World War. While Sablatnig's previous designs for the Imperial German Navy had often seen service as trainers, the SF-8 was purpose-built for this role, at Dr Sablatnig's suggestion. The SF-8 was similar to the firm's earlier designs: a conventional two-bay biplane with staggered wings of unequal span, with open cockpits in tandem.

== Operational history ==
The Navy ordered three machines for evaluation (serials 2020–2022) in 1917, which were delivered on 17 January the following year. After evaluation at Warnemünde proved favourable, the Navy ordered the type into production, placing an order for 30 machines and allocating serial numbers 6001–6030 to the batch. It is unclear how many of these were produced or delivered before the end of the war.

== Specifications ==
Data from Kroschel & Stützer 1994, p.165

General characteristics

- Crew: Two, pilot and instructor
- Length: 10.20 m (33 ft 6 in)
- Wingspan: 16.00 m (52 ft 6 in)
- Height: 3.80 m (12 ft 6 in)
- Empty weight: 1,183 kg (2,603 lb)
- Gross weight: 1,574 kg (3,465 lb)
- Powerplant: 1 × Benz Bz.III , 110 kW (150 hp)

Performance

- Maximum speed: 130 km/h (81 mph, 70 kn)
- Rate of climb: 1.1 m/s (223 ft/min)
