= Saab 24 =

Proposed Swedish dive bomber and night fighter

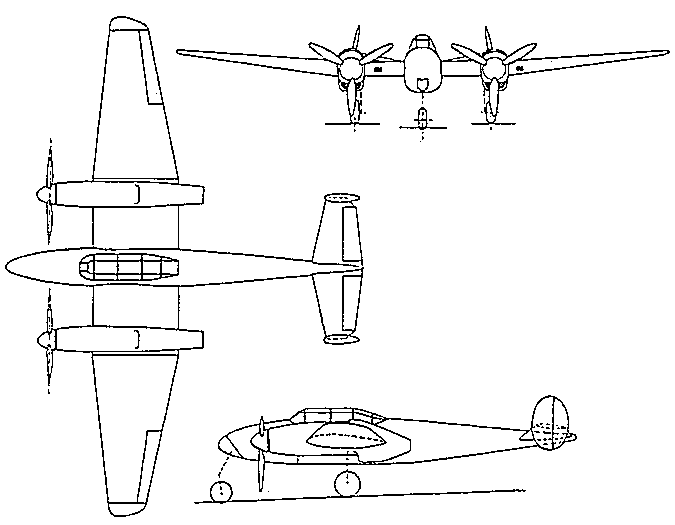
- A simple line drawing of the Saab 24's design.

General information
- Type: Dive bomber, night fighter
- National origin: Sweden
- Manufacturer: SAAB

History
- Developed from: Saab B18A
- Fate: Never entered service

The Saab 24 was a design for a twin-engine night fighter and dive bomber designed by Svenska Aeroplan AB (SAAB) around the time of the Second World War. It was initially designed to replace the widely-used Saab 18 with the Swedish Air Force but never entered service.

== Design ==
The Saab 24 was very similar in design to the earlier Saab 18, with the notable exception of its engines. While the Saab 18A was powered by dual Pratt & Whitney Twin Wasps with a max speed of 289 mph (465 km/h), the Saab 24 would have had two of the more powerful Daimler-Benz DB 605s, giving it a higher max speed and better acceleration. Nicknamed the 'Swedish Mosquito' (in reference to the British De Havilland Mosquito), it would have been able to achieve speeds of up to 392 mph (631 km/h) at an altitude of 22,000 ft (6,700 m).

== Development ==
The project began in late 1941 and proceeded through much of the design process. This included a full-scale mockup and wind tunnel testing. However, the upgrade of the Saab 18A from the Twin Wasp to the DB605 with the Saab 18B made it unnecessary to switch over production lines to a new aircraft. The project was eventually discontinued in December 1943.
