= Saab 38 =

Swedish abandoned military aircraft project

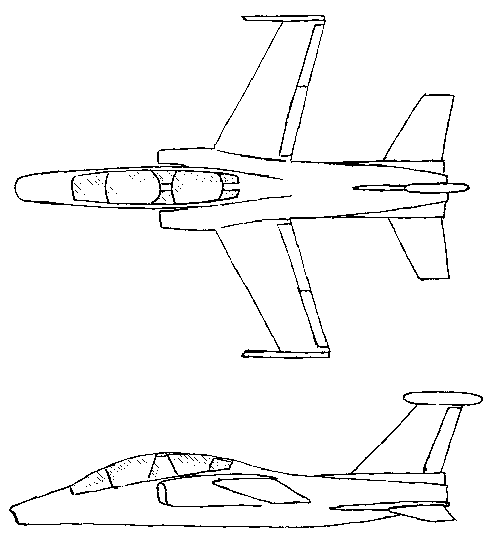

General information
- Type: Attack/Trainer
- Manufacturer: Saab/Alenia Aermacchi
- Status: Cancelled project

The Saab 38 (also known as B3LA or A 38/Sk 38) was a single-engine jet trainer and attack aircraft planned by Saab during the 1970s. The project was a collaboration between Saab and the Italian aircraft manufacturer Aermacchi. It was to replace the older Saab 105 jet trainer in the Swedish Air Force, but the aircraft never got past the drawing board and was canceled in 1979 in favour of the more advanced Saab JAS 39 Gripen fighter.

== See also ==
Aircraft of comparable role, configuration, and era

- BAE Systems Hawk
- Aermacchi MB-339
- CASA C-101
