= Salmson-Béchereau SB-4 =

General information
- Type: tourist passenger aircraft
- National origin: France
- Manufacturer: Salmson
- Designer: Louis Béchereau
- Number built: 1

History
- First flight: 1923

The Salmson-Béchereau SB-4 was a passenger aircraft built by the French company Salmson in the early 1920s.

== Design ==
The SB-4 was a high-wing monoplane intended to be used for tourist purposes, with provisions for one passenger. Only one aircraft was built.

== Specifications ==
Data from

General characteristics

- Crew: One
- Length: 6.05 m (19 ft 10 in)
- Wingspan: 8.00 m (26 ft 3 in)
- Height: 1.75 m (5 ft 9 in)
- Wing area: 14 m^{2} (150 sq ft)
- Gross weight: 240 kg (529 lb)
- Powerplant: 1 × Salmson AD.3 3 cylinder, air-cooled radial engine, 12 kW (16 hp)
- Propellers: 2-bladed

Performance

- Maximum speed: 80 km/h (50 mph, 43 kn)
