= Sanstroem Friendship 3 =

Friendship F3
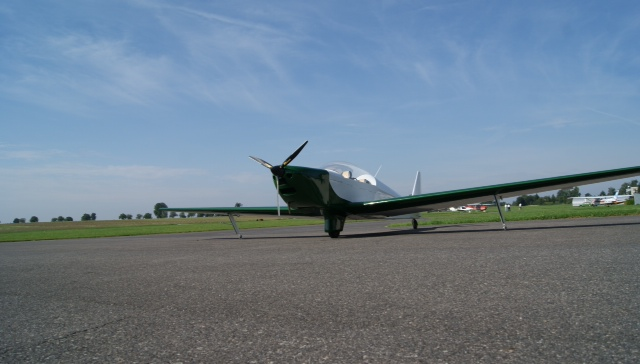
- A first production Friendship F3

General information
- Type: Ultralight aircraft
- National origin: France
- Manufacturer: Friendship Legend (R, S & Associes SAS Erik Sanstroem)
- Status: Production completed
- Number built: one

History
- Introduction date: 2012
- First flight: July 2012

The Friendship 3 is a French ultralight aircraft with tandem seats, engineered in France and Switzerland, and assembled in Czech Republic by Ivanov Aircraft for the manufacturer, R, S & Associes SAS Erik Sanstroem of Versailles, Yvelines. Inspired by 1950s and 1960s light aircraft and motorgliders, the Friendship 3 is a two-place tandem-seat ultralight aircraft with dual controls, so that the rear seated passenger can also fly.

The company seems to have been founded 2012 and gone out of business in 2014.

== Design and development ==
The Friendship 3 was designed for both soaring and cross-country powered flying, with a glide ratio of 24:1. The Friendship F3A has a composite fuselage; and wood and fabric for the wings with the main spars in carbon fiber. The aircraft was registered in France in late 2012.

== Variants ==
Friendship 3
F3A: Available with 80 hp Rotax 912 engine.
F3B: Available with 100 hp Rotax 912 engine.

== Specifications (Friendship F3A) ==
Data from Tacke

General characteristics

- Crew: one
- Capacity: one passenger
- Wingspan: 11.47 m (37 ft 8 in)
- Wing area: 11.89 m^{2} (128.0 sq ft)
- Empty weight: 292 kg (644 lb)
- Gross weight: 472.5 kg (1,042 lb)
- Fuel capacity: 70 litres (15 imp gal; 18 US gal)
- Powerplant: 1 × Rotax 912UL four cylinder, liquid and air-cooled, four stroke aircraft engine, 60 kW (80 hp)
- Propellers: 2-bladed composite

Performance

- Maximum speed: 235 km/h (146 mph, 127 kn)
- Cruise speed: 200 km/h (120 mph, 110 kn)
- Stall speed: 60 km/h (37 mph, 32 kn)
- Maximum glide ratio: 24:1
- Wing loading: 39.7 kg/m^{2} (8.1 lb/sq ft)
