= J Salmon Ltd =

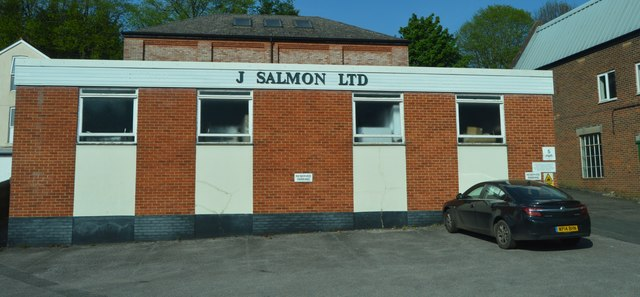
- Company type: Private company
- Industry: Publishing
- Founded: Sevenoaks, Kent, UK (1880)
- Founder: Joseph Salmon
- Area served: United Kingdom
- Website: JSalmon.com

J Salmon Ltd, founded in 1880, was a UK-based printing and publishing firm, and was the oldest established postcard and calendar publisher in Britain. It was based in Sevenoaks, Kent. It ceased trading in 2017.

== History ==
Joseph Salmon was a bookseller in London that bought a stationer's store in 1880 aiming to establish a general printing business in Kent. He held the reins of the business until 1898 when his son also Joseph Salmon took over control.

In July 2017, it was announced that the company would cease trading, due to family reasons and challenging market conditions. The copyright on imagery owned by the company is retained by the family.
