= Aero Synergie Papango =

French ultralight aircraft

Papango

General information
- Type: Ultralight aircraft
- National origin: France
- Manufacturer: Sauper/ALMS; Aero Synergie
- Status: Production completed

The Aero Synergie Papango (named for the New Zealand scaup, known in Māori as the papango) is a French ultralight aircraft that was produced by Sauper/ALMS and later by Aero Synergie. The aircraft was supplied as a kit for amateur construction and as a ready-to-fly complete aircraft. It is no longer in production as of 2012.

== Design and development ==
The aircraft was designed to comply with the Fédération Aéronautique Internationale microlight rules. It features a strut-braced high-wing, a two seats in side-by-side configuration enclosed open cockpit, conventional landing gear and a single engine in tractor configuration.

The aircraft's 9.40 m (30.8 ft) span wing employs a single strut per side. The standard engine available was the 100 hp (75 kW) Rotax 912 four-stroke powerplant. The Papango is noted for its good visibility and crew comfort.

== Operational history ==
Designed for personal use the Papango has also found employment in flight training.

== Specifications (Papango) ==
Data from Bayerl

General characteristics

- Crew: one
- Capacity: one passenger
- Wingspan: 9.40 m (30 ft 10 in)
- Wing area: 15.3 m^{2} (165 sq ft)
- Empty weight: 275 kg (606 lb)
- Gross weight: 472.5 kg (1,042 lb)
- Fuel capacity: 70 litres (15 imp gal; 18 US gal)
- Powerplant: 1 × Rotax 912ULS four cylinder, liquid and air-cooled, four stroke, 75 kW (101 hp)

Performance

- Maximum speed: 180 km/h (110 mph, 97 kn)
- Cruise speed: 150 km/h (93 mph, 81 kn)
- Stall speed: 58 km/h (36 mph, 31 kn)
- Rate of climb: 5 m/s (980 ft/min)
