= Aero Synergie J300 Joker =

French ultralight aeroplane

General information
- Type: Ultralight aircraft
- National origin: France
- Manufacturer: Sauper/ALMS; Aero Synergie
- Status: Production completed

History
- Introduction date: 1990s

The Aero Synergie J300 Joker is a French ultralight aircraft that was designed and produced by Sauper/ALMS and later by Aero Synergie. The aircraft was supplied as a kit for amateur construction and also as a complete ready-to-fly aircraft.

== Design and development ==
The aircraft was designed to comply with the Fédération Aéronautique Internationale microlight rules. It features a strut-braced high-wing, a two seats in side-by-side configuration enclosed cockpit, tricycle landing gear or conventional landing gear and a single engine in tractor configuration.

The aircraft is made from welded steel tubing, covered in doped aircraft fabric. Its 9.04 m (29.7 ft) span wing employs dual parallel struts. The standard engine fitted is the 80 hp (60 kW) Rotax 912UL four-stroke powerplant, with the 100 hp (75 kW) Rotax 912ULS optional.

Originally produced by Sauper/ALMS, the design was later manufactured by Aero Synergie. Production was halted circa 2011, although parts were still available in 2012.

== Operational history ==
Popular in Europe and Africa as a trainer, it also found use as a personal aircraft due to its simple construction and ease of handling.

== Specifications (J300) ==
Data from Bayerl

General characteristics

- Crew: one
- Capacity: one passenger
- Wingspan: 9.04 m (29 ft 8 in)
- Wing area: 15.6 m^{2} (168 sq ft)
- Empty weight: 272 kg (600 lb)
- Gross weight: 472.5 kg (1,042 lb)
- Fuel capacity: 94 litres (21 imp gal; 25 US gal)
- Powerplant: 1 × Rotax 912ULS four cylinder, liquid and air-cooled, four stroke, 75 kW (101 hp)

Performance

- Maximum speed: 180 km/h (110 mph, 97 kn)
- Cruise speed: 140 km/h (87 mph, 76 kn)
- Stall speed: 58 km/h (36 mph, 31 kn)
- Rate of climb: 5 m/s (980 ft/min)
