= Sabre 340 =

American ultralight trike

340
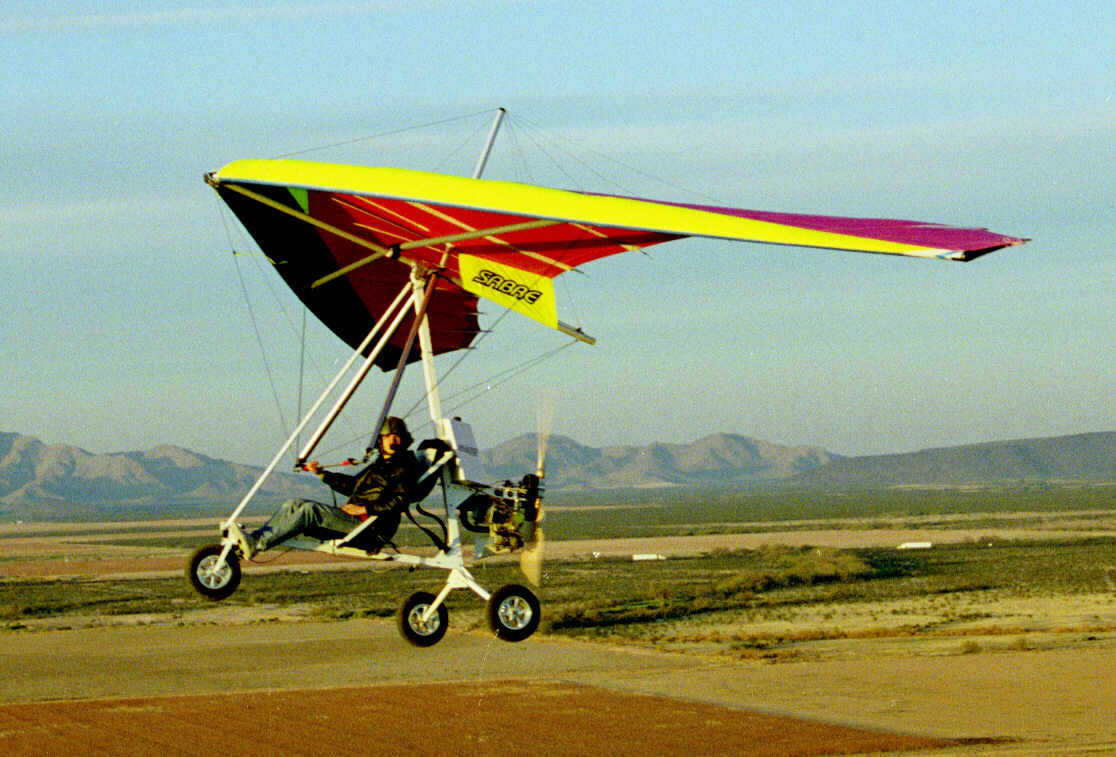

General information
- Type: Ultralight trike
- National origin: United States
- Manufacturer: Sabre Aircraft
- Status: Production completed

History
- Introduction date: 1991

The Sabre 340 is an American ultralight trike that was designed and produced by Sabre Aircraft of Buckeye, Arizona. The aircraft was supplied fully assembled.

The 340 was introduced in 1991. Sabre Aircraft ceased operations in 2008.

== Design and development ==
The aircraft was designed with a focus on low cost, to comply with the US FAR 103 Ultralight Vehicles rules, including the category's maximum empty weight of 254 lb (115 kg). The aircraft has a standard empty weight of 215 lb (98 kg) with the Sabre 14 wing. It features a cable-braced hang glider-style high wing, weight-shift controls, a single-seat open cockpit, tricycle landing gear and a single engine in pusher configuration.

The aircraft is made from tubing, with its single-surface Sabre 14 wing covered in Dacron sailcloth. Its 34 ft (10.4 m) span wing is supported by a single tube-type kingpost and uses an "A" frame control bar. As a budget design the basic aircraft has no cockpit fairing or windshield, but does feature nosewheel suspension and heavy-duty main landing gear struts as standard equipment. The standard engine supplied was the twin cylinder, two-stroke, air-cooled Kawasaki 340 snowmobile engine, which produces 30 hp (22 kW). Available factory options included a fiberglass cockpit fairing, nosewheel brakes, wheel pants, ballistic parachute and an aero-tow kit. Optional engines included the 40 hp (30 kW) Rotax 447 and the 50 hp (37 kW) Rotax 503. The standard wing supplied was Sabre Aircraft's own Sabre 14 single-surface wing, with the double-surface Ukrainian-built Aeros Stranger 15 wing optional.

The design achieved a very low price point and in its basic configuration sold for US$6,000, complete and ready to fly, in the late 1990s. It was the least expensive complete aircraft available at that time.

== Specifications (340) ==
Data from Cliche and Kitplanes

General characteristics

- Crew: one
- Length: 10 ft (3.0 m)
- Wingspan: 34 ft (10 m) with Sabre 14 wing
- Height: 13 ft (4.0 m)
- Wing area: 148 sq ft (13.7 m^{2})
- Empty weight: 215 lb (98 kg)
- Gross weight: 600 lb (272 kg)
- Fuel capacity: 5 U.S. gallons (19 L; 4.2 imp gal)
- Powerplant: 1 × Kawasaki 340 twin cylinder, two-stroke, air-cooled snowmobile engine, 30 hp (22 kW)

Performance

- Cruise speed: 50 mph (80 km/h, 43 kn)
- Stall speed: 26 mph (42 km/h, 23 kn)
- Range: 120 mi (190 km, 100 nmi)
- Service ceiling: 10,000 ft (3,000 m)
- Rate of climb: 700 ft/min (3.6 m/s)
