= Percy Salmon =

Australian rules footballer

Personal information
- Full name: Percy Jabez Salmon
- Born: 20 October 1885; Ondit, Victoria
- Died: 24 September 1963 (aged 77); Colac, Victoria
- Original team: Beeac

Playing career^{1}
| Years | Club | Games (Goals) |
| 1908–09 | Geelong | 17 (7) |
- ^{1} Playing statistics correct to the end of 1909.

Percy Jabez Salmon (20 October 1885 – 24 September 1963) was an Australian rules footballer who played with Geelong in the Victorian Football League (VFL).
