= Savoia-Marchetti SM.91 =

Italian heavy fighter prototype (1943–44)

SM.91

General information
- Type: Heavy fighter
- Role: Fighter-bomber
- National origin: Italy
- Manufacturer: Savoia-Marchetti
- Status: Retired
- Primary user: Regia Aeronautica
- Number built: 2

History
- First flight: 11 March 1943

The Savoia-Marchetti SM.91 was a two-seat, twin-engined, Italian heavy fighter prototype, designed to compete in a 1942 revision to a long-range fighter-bomber contract offered by the Regia Aeronautica to Italian aircraft companies in 1938. The original 1938 specification yielded the Savoia-Marchetti SM.88, which the SM.91 was largely based on.

== Design and development ==
In July 1942, the Regia Aeronautica requested designs for a new aircraft, propelled by the German DB 605 engine, capable of flying at 620 km/h (385 mph) with a range of 1,600 km (990 mi). The armament should consist of six MG 151 cannons in the nose and wings and a 12.7 mm Breda-SAFAT machine gun as a defensive weapon. It should have an 800 kg (1,800 lb) bomb load. At that point, the request for a long-range fighter killed the SM.88, still in development, and the SM.91, a larger, heavier and more modern design, was authorized.

The fuselage and the wings were all-metal, to achieve the best performance regardless of cost. The central nacelle held the crew of two, and the wings and tail were similar to the SM.88. Fuel capacity was 1,600 L, but with auxiliary tanks could be raised to 1,800 L. It is unknown if it was capable of a range of 1,600 km (990 mi).

The two DB 605 engines gave a total of 2,950 hp. The aircraft's maximum speed at 585 km/h (363 mph) was better than the SM.88. There were three 20 mm MG 151s in the nose. Two more were mounted in the wings, close to the fuselage. Another machine gun was provided for the rear gunner. Total bomb load was 1,640 kg (3,620 lb) or a torpedo.

The prototype, designated MM.530, flew for the first time on 11 March 1943, tested by Aldo Moggi. There were two prototypes, the second a modified SM.88 prototype.

The machine flew at Vergiate and logged 27 hours in the next few months. It was advanced, but was not entered into the official tests at Guidonia, perhaps because it was still undergoing testing. The first prototype was captured and sent to Germany in October 1943, after which it vanished and is presumed destroyed. The second prototype, in an incomplete state, was captured by the Germans when they occupied northern Italy in September 1943. This aircraft was tested on 10 July 1944, but was destroyed by Allied bombers later in the year.

== Specifications (SM.91) ==
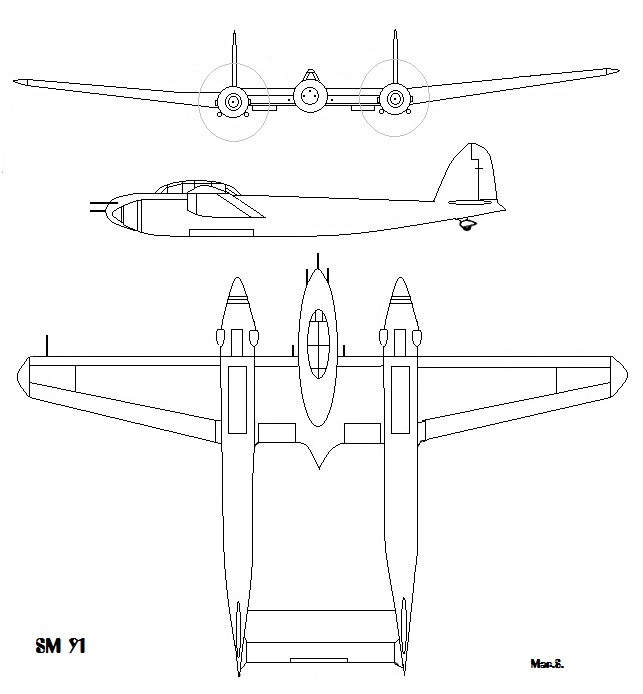

Data from Italian Civil and Military Aircraft 1930–1945

General characteristics

- Crew: 2 (pilot and rear gunner)
- Length: 13.25 m (43 ft 6 in)
- Wingspan: 19.7 m (64 ft 8 in)
- Height: 3.85 m (12 ft 8 in)
- Wing area: 41.76 m^{2} (449.5 sq ft)
- Empty weight: 6,400 kg (14,110 lb)
- Gross weight: 8,890 kg (19,600 lb)
- Fuel capacity: 1,600 L (420 US gal; 350 imp gal) + optional 825 L (218 US gal; 181 imp gal) drop-tank
- Powerplant: 2 × Daimler-Benz DB 605A-1 V-12 inverted liquid-cooled piston engines 1,475 PS (1,455 hp; 1,085 kW)
- Propellers: 3-bladed constant-speed propellers

Performance

- Maximum speed: 584 km/h (363 mph, 315 kn) at 7,000 m (23,000 ft)
- Cruise speed: 515 km/h (320 mph, 278 kn)
- Range: 1,600 km (990 mi, 860 nmi)
- Ferry range: 1,000 km (620 mi, 540 nmi)
- Service ceiling: 11,000 m (36,000 ft)
- Time to altitude: 6,000 m (20,000 ft) in 8 minutes 30 seconds

Armament

- Guns: 6 × 20 mm (0.787 in) MG 151 cannon (three in the nacelle nose, two in the wing-roots and one in the rear cockpit.)
- Bombs: 1,640 kg (3,616 lb) bombload:- 4x 100 kg (220 lb) bombs or 4x 160 kg (353 lb) bombs or 1x 500 kg (1,102 lb) bomb or 1x torpedo or 1x 825 L (218 US gal; 181 imp gal) drop-tank

== See also ==
Related development

- Savoia-Marchetti SM.88

Aircraft of comparable role, configuration, and era

- de Havilland Mosquito
- Lockheed P-38 Lightning
- Mansyu Ki-98
- Messerschmitt Me 609
- Petlyakov Pe-3
- Fokker G.I

Related lists

- List of Regia Aeronautica aircraft used in World War II
