= Savoia-Marchetti SM.88 =

Italian heavy fighter prototype

SM.88

General information
- Type: Heavy fighter
- Manufacturer: Savoia-Marchetti
- Status: Prototype only; Never entered production
- Number built: 1

History
- First flight: 1939
- Variants: Savoia-Marchetti SM.91; Savoia-Marchetti SM.92

The Savoia-Marchetti SM.88, was an Italian twin-engined, three-seat, heavy fighter prototype of World War II, featuring a twin-boom structure, and powered by German Daimler-Benz DB 601 engines.

The SM.88, intended for export, was a land-based, multi-role heavy fighter regarded as an advanced combat aircraft at the time of its debut in 1939. Though Savoia had already developed a similar twin-boom aircraft, (the S.55) the layout was regarded as a new concept for Italian aircraft industries.

The crew of three, two pilots and a rear gunner, were housed in a fully glazed ejectable crew nacelle located in the middle of the centre wing panel, behind the two Daimler-Benz DB 601 engines. The tail had two vertical rudders with a single horizontal surface between. The retractable landing gear consisted of four wheels, two in the front fuselage and one on the tail-end of each boom. The structure was a wooden frame covered with a metal skin.

When the aircraft bombed a target, the pilot took on the role of bombardier, lying on the floor of the fuselage to sight the bombs, while the co-pilot flew the aircraft. The rear defensive gun was encased in a flexible plastic enclosure in the crew nacelle while two more 12.7 mm Breda-SAFAT heavy machine guns were mounted in the wings.

With the advent of World War II, the Germans denied permission to export the DB 601 engine to Italy, effectively leaving the SM.88 without powerplants. The Regia Aeronautica declined to order the aircraft due to the similar performance of the Messerschmitt Bf 110, which was already proven as reliable, in production and had better armament.

In 1942 the Regia Aeronautica requested a redesign of the aircraft into a fast reconnaissance aircraft or bomber. They requested a range of 2,000 km (1,240 mi) with auxiliary tanks, or 1,500 km (930 mi) with 500 kg (1,100 lb) bombload (with an effective radius of 750 km (465 mi)). Savoia-Marchetti would design the SM.91 and the SM.92 in response, both largely inspired by the SM.88.

== Specifications (SM.88) ==
General characteristics

- Crew: 3
- Length: 12.1 m (39 ft 8 in)
- Wingspan: 14.5 m (47 ft 7 in)
- Height: 3.5 m (11 ft 6 in)
- Wing area: 32.5 m^{2} (350 sq ft)
- Empty weight: 5,000 kg (11,023 lb)
- Gross weight: 7,000 kg (15,432 lb)
- Fuel capacity: 1,250 L (275 imp gal) in 10 wing tanks
- Powerplant: 2 × Daimler-Benz DB 601 V-12 inverted liquid-cooled piston engine

Performance

- Maximum speed: 560 km/h (350 mph, 300 kn)
- Service ceiling: 8,700 m (28,500 ft)
- Time to altitude: 5,000 m (16,400 ft) in 12 min 30 sec

Armament

- Guns: 3 × 12.7 mm (0.500 in) Breda-SAFAT machine guns
- Bombs: 600 kg (1,323 lb) bombload

== See also ==
Related lists

- List of Regia Aeronautica aircraft used in World War II
