= Salmson-Béchereau SB-5 =

Two-seater fighter aircraft

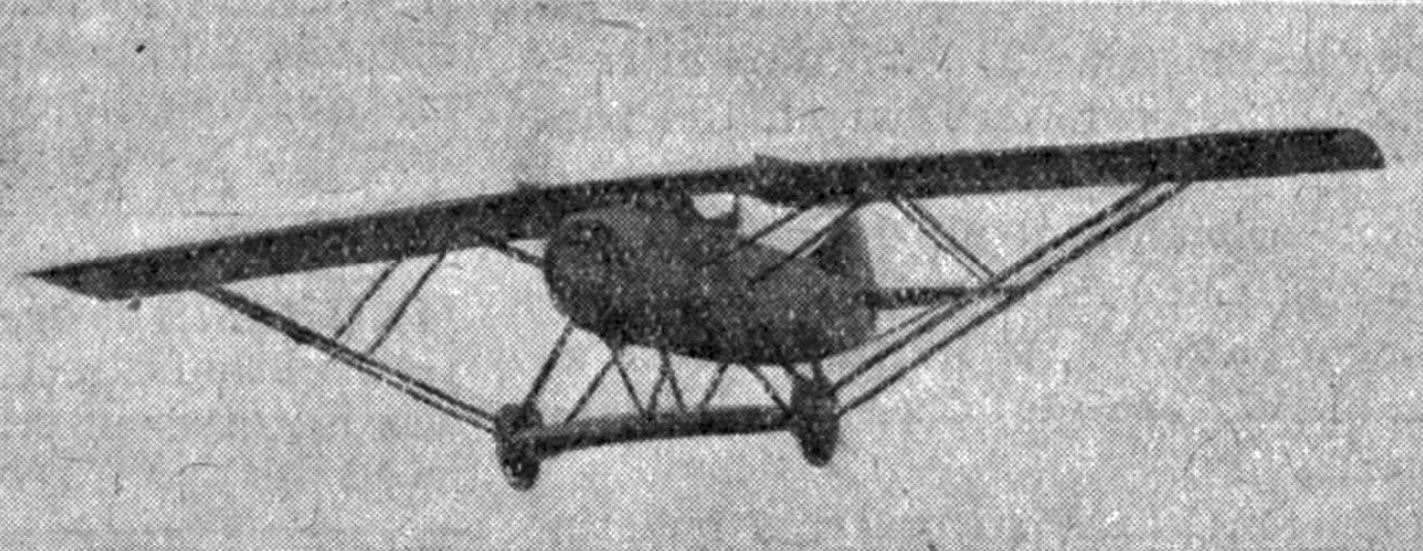

General information
- Type: Two seat fighter aircraft
- National origin: France
- Manufacturer: Salmson
- Designer: Louis Béchereau

History
- First flight: Late 1925 or early 1926

The Salmson-Béchereau SB-5 was a two-seat fighter aircraft built for a French government programme in 1925. Despite a powerful engine it did not perform well and only one was built.

== Design ==
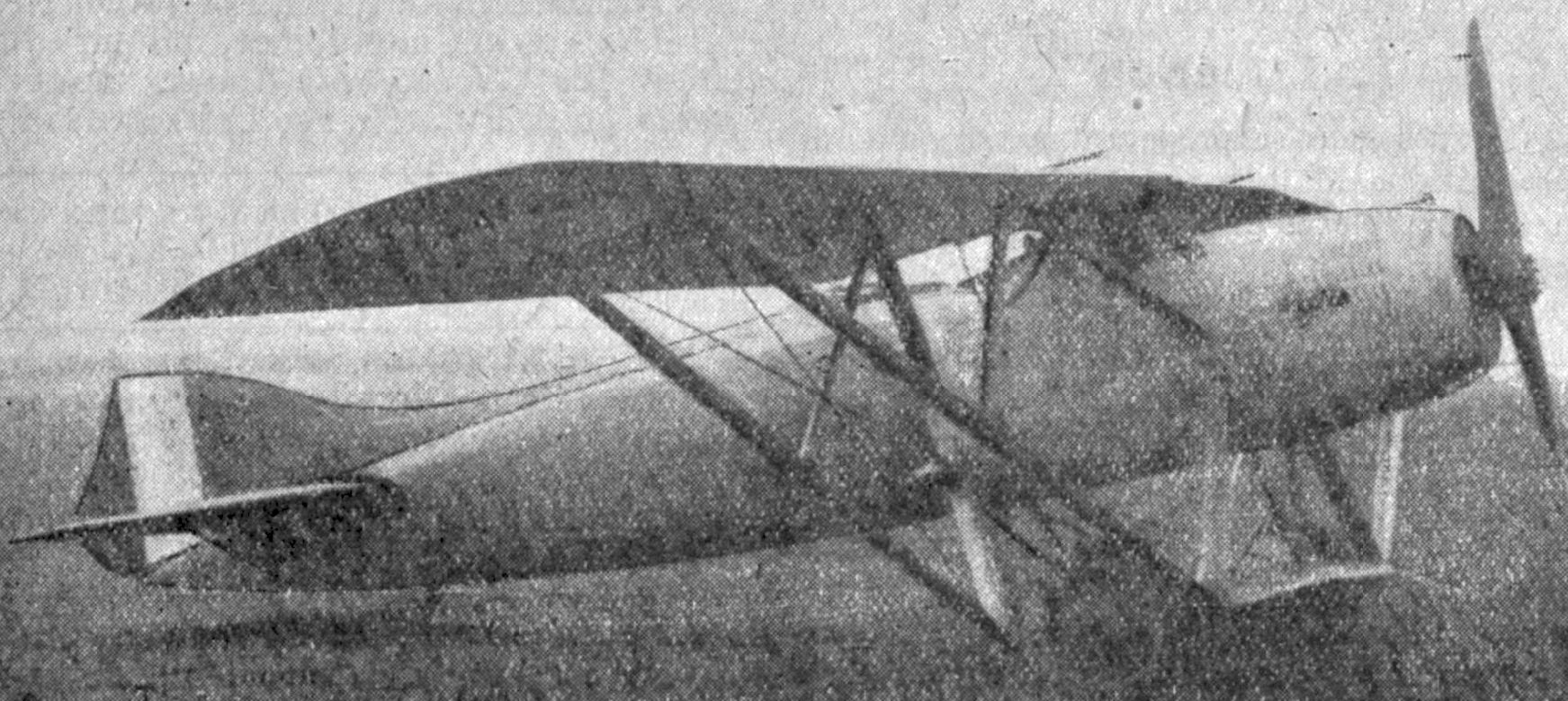
Salmson-Béchereau C.2 photo from Les Ailes April 15, 1926

The Salmson-Béchereau SB-5, sometimes known as the Béchereau C.2 (C.2 denoting a two-seat chasseure or fighter) was Salmon's response to the French 1925 two seat fighter programme. Its strut-braced, parasol wing design owed much to Béchereau's 1921 Letord-Béchereau 2 and 1924 Buscaylet-Béchereau 2 single seat fighters and, like them, it used a similar type of 370 kW (500 hp) Salmson 18Cm eighteen cylinder water-cooled radial engine.

The wing of the SB-5 was in two parts, joined low over the fuselage by a pair of cabane struts. Beyond the section, where a pronounced reduction (c.50%) in chord, particularly on the trailing edge, provided a better field of view for the pilot, the wings were straight edged and of constant chord out to almost square tips. The wings were mounted with about 2° of sweep and 3° of anhedral. Each half-wing was built around two spruce longerons with pine ribs and plywood covered at the leading edge with fabric elsewhere.

It was noted at the time that the wings were very thin and so required elaborate struttage which also involved the fixed landing gear. The central part of the latter was a wooden airfoil section, 3 m (9 ft 10 in) span plane which contributed an extra 13% lifting area. This had metal carriers at its tips, each supported by a pair of almost parallel struts to the lower fuselage. Split axles, mounted centrally on a transverse V-strut from the fuselage, were connected to the carriers via rubber shock absorbers and mounted the wheels. The main wing struts converged slightly from the carriers to the wing longerons at about 80% span. From near the midpoint of these struts a further pair of inverted Vs braced the inner wing to the upper fuselage.

The forward part of the SB-5's fuselage was designed around the 390 kW (520 hp) Salmson 18Cmb water-cooled radial engine, which was set back from the propeller on a 1.00 m (3 ft 3 in) extension shaft. The fuselage was built around four longerons but had a near-circular cross-section shaped by formers and covered with fabric. The pilot's open cockpit was entirely under the central trailing edge opening and the rear cockpit was very close behind, still partly forward of the outer trailing edge. The intention, probably never realised, was that the SB-5 should have two fixed, forward firing 7.7 mm (0.303 in) machine guns controlled by the pilot and another pair on a flexible mount for the gunner. The fuselage tapered to the rear with a ridge fairing which began behind the gunner's cockpit, ran along the spine and blended into a slightly rounded, low and broad fin, integral with the fuselage, which carried a pentagonal rudder. The SB-5's tailplane, at the top of the fuselage, was generous and more rounded in plan than the fin and braced on each side by a strut from below. Its elevator trailing edges were level with the rudder hinge.

== Development ==
The exact date of the first flight of the SB-5 is not known but, described as new, it was being test flown by Duchamps in the last week of January 1926. By April it was at the government testing ground at Villacoublay, where tests revealed handling problems sufficiently serious to require significant modifications. When these were completed in the summer of 1926, the aircraft was redesignated the Salmson-Béchereaux SB-6. The most important changes were to the wings, where the ailerons now occupied all the trailing edge, and the size of its central cut-out was reduced. In addition the propeller drive shaft was shortened, reducing the SB-6's length by 300 mm (11.8 in).

Further testing showed the performance of the SB-6 did not meet the requirements of the two seat programme specification. Béchereaux then left Salmson to form his own company, the Société pour la Réalisation d'Avion Prototypes (S.R.A.P.) and the SB-6 was displayed at the Paris Aero Salon in December 1926 as the S.R.A.P. 2; shortly afterwards the C.2 programme itself was abandoned and development of the S.R.A.P. 2 ended.

== Variants ==
SB-5
The original aircraft, flown in January 1926.
SB-6
SB-5 with modified wing and engine installation, flown summer 1926. Exhibited at the 1926 Paris Salon as the S.R.A.P. 2.

== Specifications (SB-6) ==
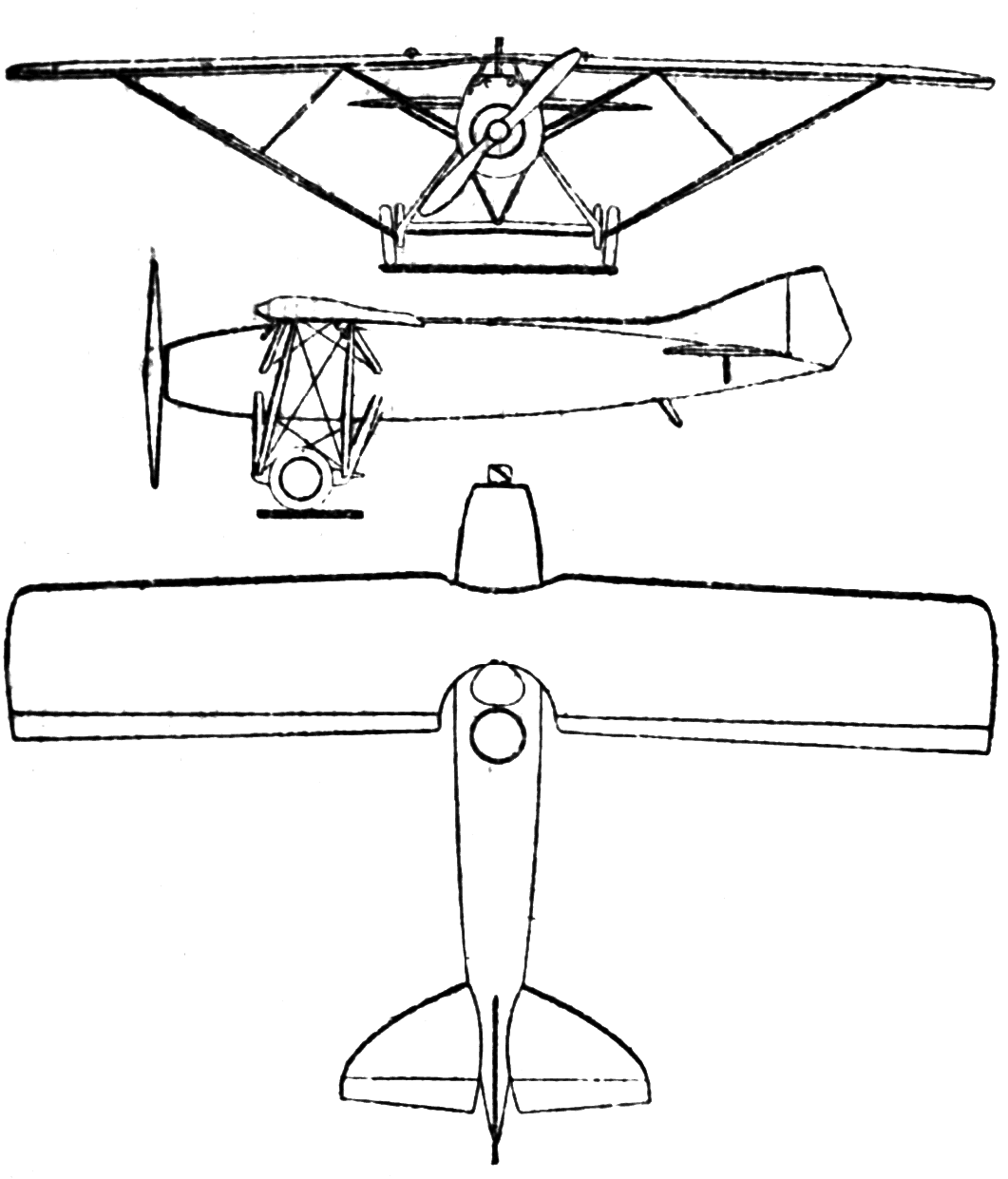
Salmson-Béchereau SB-5 3-view drawing from Le Document aéronautique March,1927

Data from Green & Swanborough (1994), p.518

General characteristics

- Crew: Two
- Length: 9.7 m (31 ft 10 in)
- Wingspan: 14.6 m (47 ft 11 in)
- Height: 3.0 m (9 ft 10 in)
- Wing area: 35 m^{2} (380 sq ft)
- Empty weight: 1,558 kg (3,435 lb)
- Gross weight: 2,360 kg (5,203 lb)
- Powerplant: 1 × Salmson 18Cmb 18 cylinder, water-cooled radial engine, 390 kW (520 hp)
- Propellers: 2-bladed

Performance

- Maximum speed: 220 km/h (140 mph, 120 kn) at 3,000 m (9,800 ft)
- Service ceiling: 7,150 m (23,460 ft)
- Time to altitude: 3,000 m (9,800 ft) 9.0 min

Armament

- Guns: provision for 2×7.7 mm (0.303 in) fixed, forward firing machine guns, plus another pair on a flexible mount in rear cockpit.
