= Sablatnig SF-1 =

SF-1
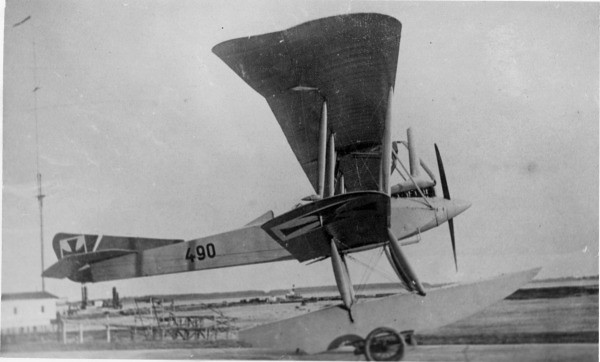

General information
- Type: Reconnaissance seaplane
- National origin: Germany
- Manufacturer: Sablatnig
- Designer: Josef Sablatnig
- Primary user: Imperial German Navy
- Number built: 1

History
- First flight: 1915

The Sablatnig SF-1 was a reconnaissance seaplane built in Germany during the First World War.

== Development ==
It was a conventional two-bay biplane with staggered wings of unequal span and a fuselage of particularly sleek design. The pilot and observer sat in open cockpits in tandem, and the undercarriage consisted of twin pontoons braced to the underside of the fuselage and to wings.

== Operational history ==
Sablatnig delivered the SF-1 prototype to the SVK (Seeflugzeug Versuchs Kommando – "Seaplane Testing Command") in October 1915 under the naval serial number 490. It was finally accepted into active naval service a full two years later, in October 1917. Although accepted for service with the Imperial German Navy, only the prototype was built, and no production order was forthcoming.

== Operators ==
Germany

- Imperial German Navy Air Service

SVK (Seeflugzeug Versuchs Kommando – "Seaplane Testing Command")

== Specifications ==
Data from Kroschel & Stützer 1994, p.135

General characteristics

- Crew: Two, pilot and observer
- Wingspan: 19.10 m (62 ft 8 in)
- Height: 4.35 m (14 ft 3 in)
- Empty weight: 1,015 kg (2,233 lb)
- Gross weight: 1,650 kg (3,630 lb)
- Powerplant: 1 × Mercedes D.III , 120 kW (160 hp)

Performance

- Maximum speed: 125 km/h (78 mph, 68 kn)
- Rate of climb: 1.7 m/s (328 ft/min)
