= Savoia-Marchetti SM.92 =

1943 Italian prototype heavy fighter aircraft

SM.92
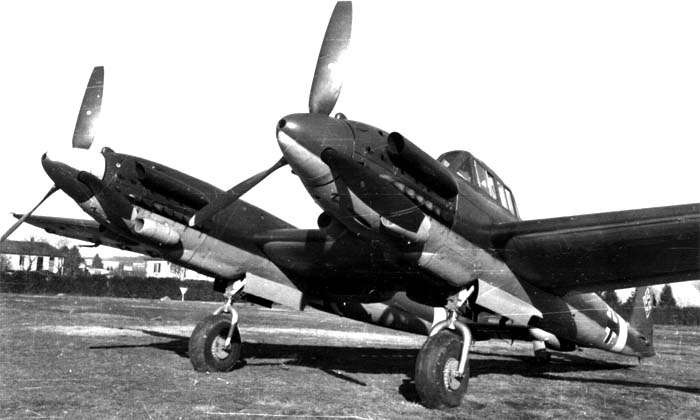

General information
- Type: Heavy fighter
- Role: Fighter-bomber
- Manufacturer: Savoia-Marchetti
- Status: Prototype
- Primary user: Aeronautica Nazionale Repubblicana (intended)
- Number built: 1

History
- First flight: October 1943

The Savoia-Marchetti SM.92 was an Italian heavy fighter of World War II based on the Savoia-Marchetti SM.88. The SM.92 did away with the mid-wing crew nacelle, positioning the two-person crew solely in the left fuselage. It was equipped with two DB 605 engines and was intended to serve as long-range fighter-bomber.

Armament consisted of three 20 mm MG 151 cannon, two in the mid-wing and one in the right fuselage, and five 12.7 mm machine guns, two under each engine, and one remotely controlled in the tail. A bombload of up to 2,000 kg (4,400 lb) could be carried under the inner wing, and 160 kg (350 lb) bombs were carried under the outer wings.

During development, the maximum speed was increased, but it still failed to meet the requirements. Its complex and advanced structure contributed to difficulties in producing a functional prototype. The prototype MM.531 flew for the first time in October 1943 and accumulated over 21 hours of flight time.

In March 1944 it was mistaken for a P-38 Lightning and attacked by a Macchi C.205. The aircraft survived by performing evasive manoeuvres, but it was so badly damaged that it was grounded for months. The SM.92 was destroyed by Allied bombing in 1944.

== Specifications (SM.92) ==
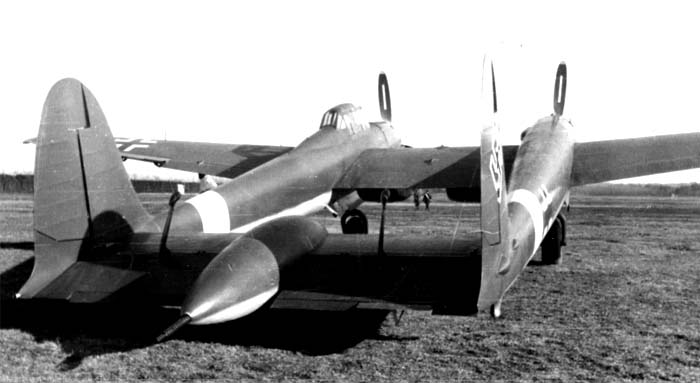
SM.92 rear view

Data from Italian Civil and Military Aircraft 1930–1945

General characteristics

- Crew: 2 (pilot and rear gunner)
- Length: 13.7 m (44 ft 11 in)
- Wingspan: 18.55 m (60 ft 10 in)
- Height: 4.15 m (13 ft 7 in)
- Wing area: 38.52 m^{2} (414.6 sq ft)
- Empty weight: 5,900 kg (13,007 lb)
- Gross weight: 8,750 kg (19,290 lb)
- Powerplant: 2 × Daimler-Benz DB 605A-1 V-12 inverted liquid-cooled piston engines 1,475 PS (1,455 hp; 1,085 kW)
- Propellers: 3-bladed constant-speed propellers

Performance

- Maximum speed: 615 km/h (382 mph, 332 kn) at 6,700 m (22,000 ft)
- Cruise speed: 539 km/h (335 mph, 291 kn)
- Range: 2,000 km (1,200 mi, 1,100 nmi)
- Service ceiling: 12,000 m (39,000 ft)
- Time to altitude: 6,000 m (20,000 ft) in 7 minutes 10 seconds

Armament

- Guns:

- 3 × 20 mm MG 151 cannons
- 5 × 12.7 mm Breda-SAFAT machine guns

- Bombs:

- Up to 2,000 kg (4,400 lb) bombload
