= FS Class E.424 =

Class of Italian electric locomotives

FS class E.424
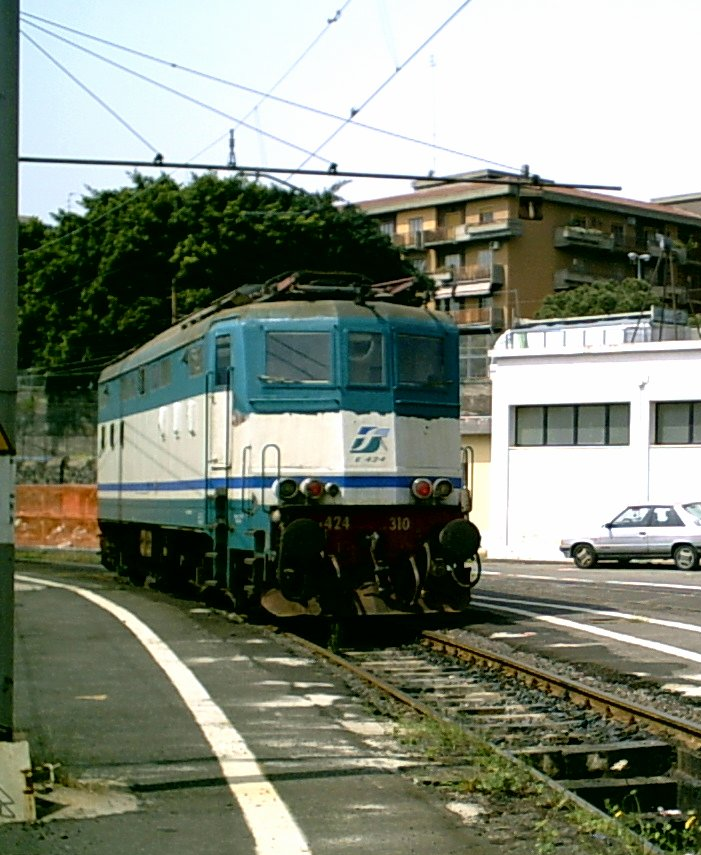
- A E.424N in Catania with the recent XMPR livery
Type and origin
- Power type: Electric
- Builder: Breda, Off. Savigliano, Off. Reggiane/Ercole Marelli, OM/CGE, Ansaldo, TIBB
- Build date: 1943-1951
Specifications
- Configuration
  - UIC: Bo′Bo′
- Gauge: 1,435 mm (4 ft 8 1/2 in) standard gauge
- Wheel diameter: 1.250 m (49.21 in)
- Wheelbase: 7.350 m (24 ft 1 3/8 in) between bogies 3.150 m (124.02 in) between axles of each bogie
- Length: 15.540 m (50 ft 11 3/4 in)
- Loco weight: 72 short tons (64 long tons; 65 t)
- Electric system/s: 3,000 V DC Catenary
- Current pickup: Pantograph
- Traction motors: DC series
- Transmission: 19/65 gear ratio
- Safety systems: RSC4
Performance figures
- Maximum speed: 120 km/h (75 mph)
- Power output: 1,500 kW (2,000 hp)
- Tractive effort: 168 kN (38,000 lb_{f})
Career
- Operators: FS Trenitalia
- First run: 1943
- Disposition: decommissioned in 2008

The FS E.424 is a class of Italian railways electric locomotives. They were built in 1943-1951 and have been decommissioned in 2008.

== History ==
A design for a small multi-service Bo′Bo′ locomotive, with speed up to 90 km/h (56 mph), had been devised by Giuseppe Bianchi as early as in the 1930s, but the project had been halted by the introduction of the E.326 and E.428. After the realization of the 6-axle E.636, it was however decided to revamp the project by adapting to it some solutions already in use on the E.636 (engines, bogies, suspension etc.).

Breda SpA workshop provided the three prototypes of E.424 in 1943–1944. Mass production, however, could begin only after the end of World War II, part of the funds provided by the United Nations Relief and Rehabilitation Administration program.

=== Series ===
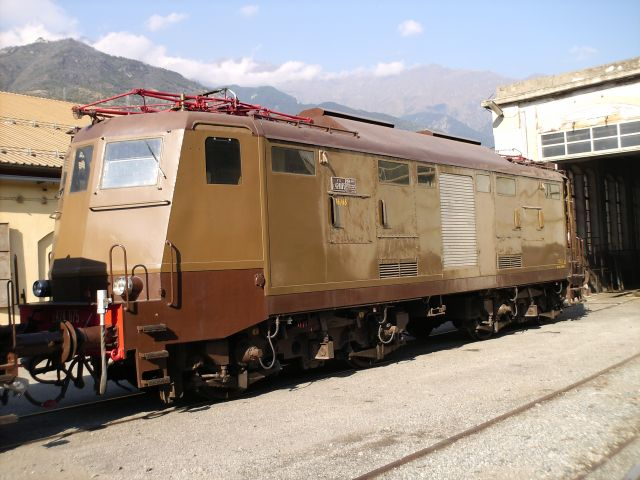
Unit 075 (non "N") in its original livery, property of FerAlp Team museum, in Bussoleno

The locomotives have been built in four series starting from 1943:

- 001-003: prototype units with 32R-200 motors, 21/65 gear ratio, max speed 100 km/h (62 mph) and 2 field shunts; unit 003 had 20/65 gear ratio, for a maximum speed of 120 km/h (75 mph), and also had compound-type motors (model 92-250).
- 004-013: compound-type 92-250 motors (as unit 003), max speed 100 km/h (62 mph), 19/65 gear ratio.
- 014-038 and 057-078: units from 017 to 020 plus unit 022 and 024 were identical to units 001/2; units 014, 023, 025, 057 and 060 had 19/65 gear ratio that enabled the locomotives to reach 120 km/h (75 mph); all the others had 92-250 motors, 2 field shunts, 16/65 gear ratio for a max speed of 100 km/h (62 mph); unit 068 was transformed, from November 1954 to May 1974, into unit E434-068: this unit had 4 double 82-333 motors, 2 shunts and 110 km/h (68 mph)-able 20/69 gear ratio; they have been used as experiments for the following FS Class E.646 locomotives.
- 039-056 and 079-158: units with 92-250 motors, 16/65 gear ratio for a max speed of 100 km/h (62 mph) and 5 field shunts, except for unit 136 that had 19/65 gear ratio (max speed 120 km/h or 75 mph).
- Series 200 units: starting from 1986, to 1993, 105 units have received an automatic fire extinguishing system, anti-slip device, red and green lights and the 78-wire cable to permit remote control for use with commuter trains, and maximum speed was raised to 120 km/h (75 mph). These units are also referred to as E.424N, where "N" stands for "Navetta" (push-pull); also, number 200 has been added to units' serial number (i.e. E.424.116 became E.424.316).

== Technical ==
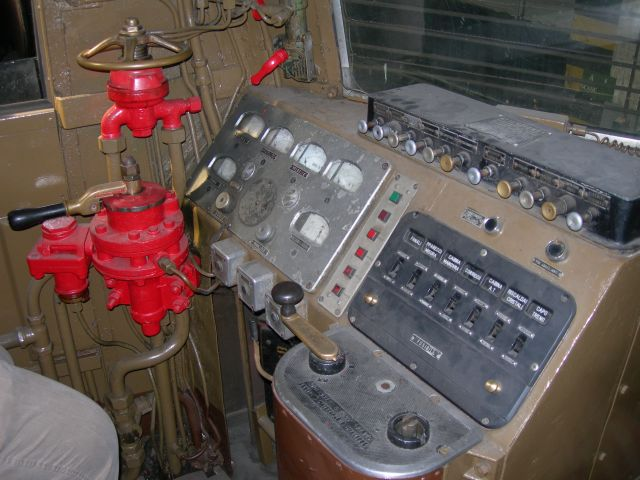
Original E.424 driver console.

Class E.424, having DC type motors like all the Italian locomotives of the time, is a rheostatic-type locomotive; on start, a rheostat is connected in series to the motors and is gradually excluded as speed builds up allowing more current to flow to the motors; unlike other rheostatic locomotives of that time, this is not achieved via the characteristic lever (Maniglione), but through an automatic system, called Avviatore Automatico, derived from contemporary first-generation ALe 790/880/883 EMUs.

The driver simply selects the combination (series or parallel), and the relative rheostat contactors are automatically and gradually closed by this system; in case of failure, the driver can manually rotate an apposite wheel (that also usually rotates automatically as the system advances) to proceed with the exclusion.

When the rheostat is completely excluded for the series combination, field shunts can be inserted, or the driver can proceed to parallel combination, making a transition, which is handled by a device called 'CEM' that automatically combines the motors (closing various contacts) accordingly.

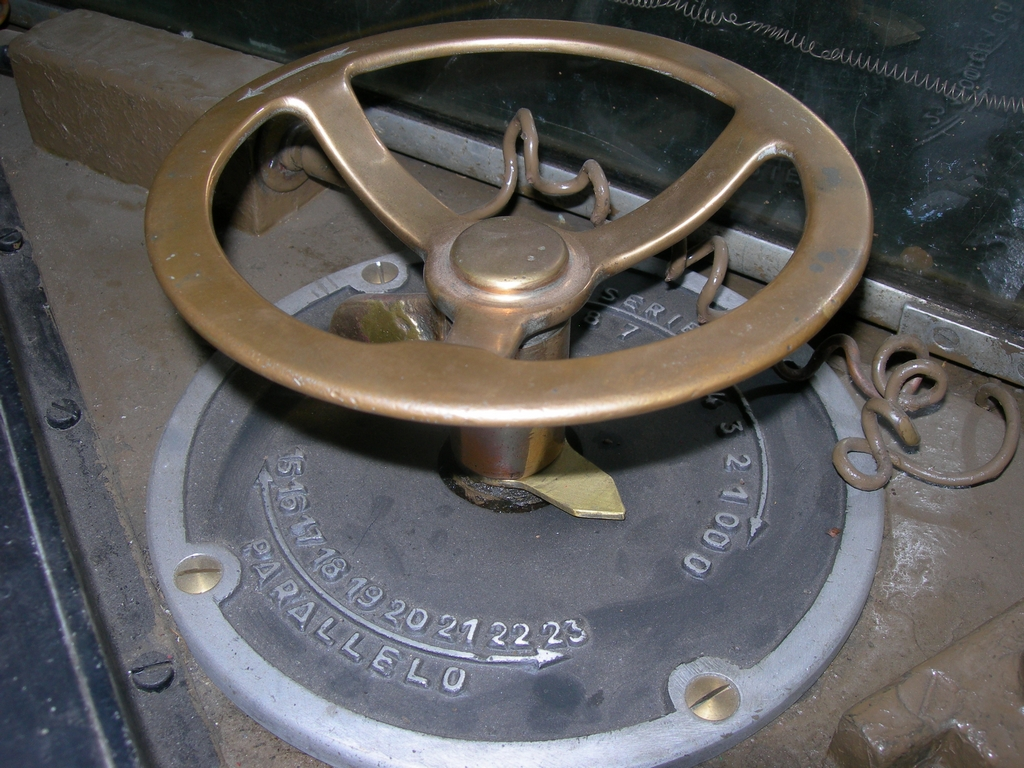
The Avviatore Automatico wheel that rotates during rheostatic exclusion; can be maneuvered manually in case of failure.

Originally more than one unit could be coupled and be controlled remotely by the first locomotive using a system called Comando Multiplo; on the central part of the cab there also was a door that enabled the crew to pass from one locomotive to another in case of problems. However, because of safety issues and the imperfect reliability of this system (there were no instruments indicating the status of the slave locomotive, so it was not certain if it correctly made a transition or not, for example), it was abandoned and then disassembled.

Eleven units received compound-type motors, enabling a very fine speed control, in a range included between 25 and 50 km/h (16 and 31 mph) in series combination, and 50–100 km/h (31–62 mph) in parallel.

== See also ==
- FS Class E.646
- FS Class E.636
