= FS Class E.333 =

Class E.333
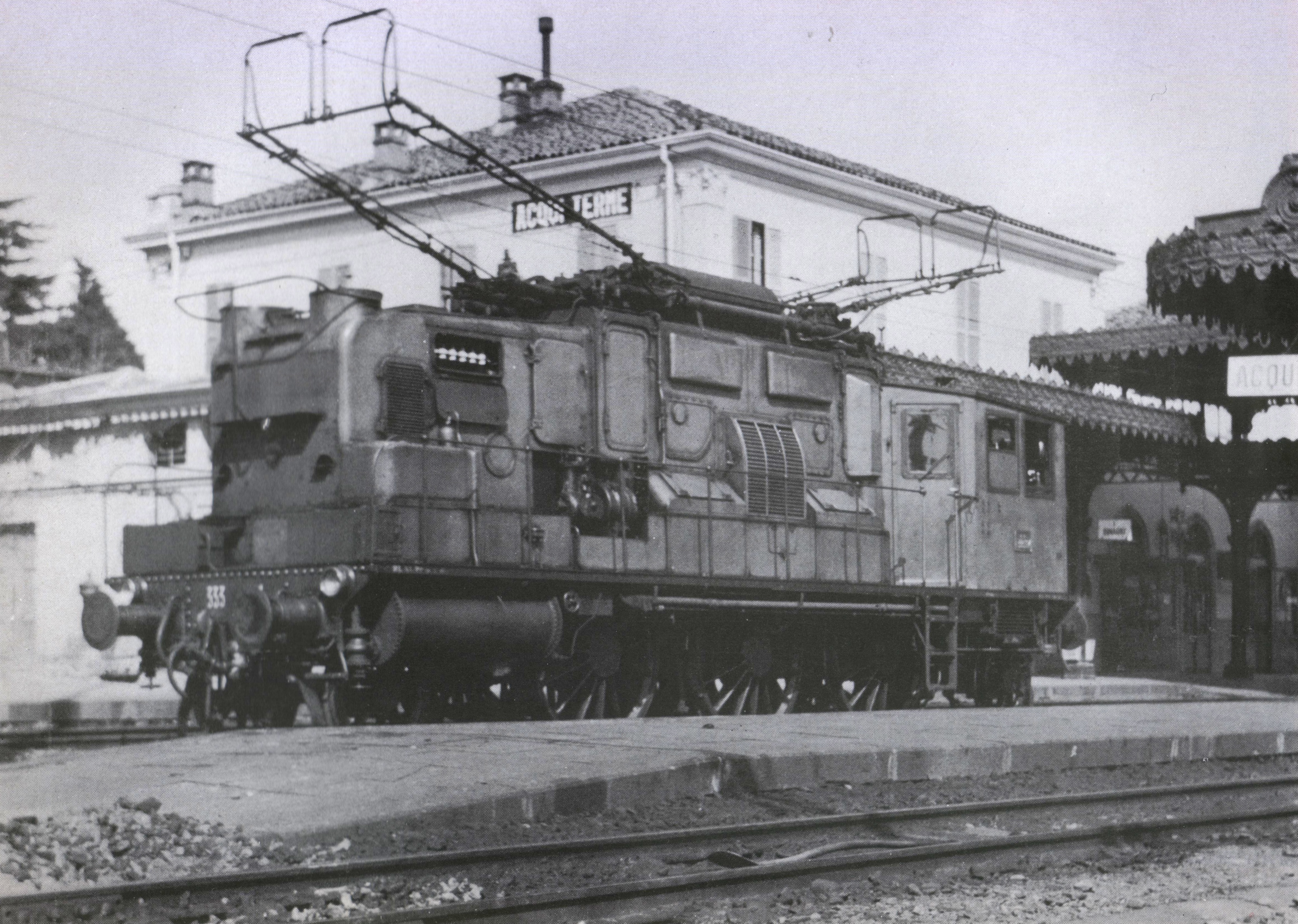
- E.333.004, at Acqui Terme railway station in 1950. Note the single-cab design
Type and origin
- Power type: electric
- Builder: Società Nicola Romeo di Saronno and Officine Meccaniche e Navali di Napoli
- Build date: 1922-1924
- Total produced: 40
Specifications
- Configuration
  - AAR: 1-C-1
  - UIC: 1'C1'
- Gauge: 1,435 mm (4 ft 8 1/2 in) standard gauge
- Driver dia.: 1,630 mm (64 in)
- Adhesive weight: 45 tonnes (44 long tons; 50 short tons)
- Loco weight: 73 tonnes (72 long tons; 80 short tons)
- Electric system/s: Three-phase overhead line 3.6 kV, 16.7 Hz
Performance figures
- Maximum speed: 75 km/h (47 mph)
- Power output: 1,600 kW (2,100 hp)
Career
- Operators: FS

FS Class E.333 was a class of electric locomotives of the Ferrovie dello Stato (FS), powered by three-phase alternating current, which were in service from 1923 to 1968. They were designed by Kálmán Kandó for hauling fast passenger trains. Having the same electrical equipment as the FS Class E.552 locomotives, they presented the same defects and had to be modified. After modification, they were able to carry out the services for which they were designed.

== Overview ==
For service on the three-phase AC electrified lines in 1920, FS had locomotives of classes E.550, E.330, E.331 and E.332. All were based on electrical systems designed and patented by foreign companies. The FS Material and Traction Service, wishing to free itself of this burden, independently planned the classes E.551 and E.431. Kálmán Kandó (the designer of the E.550 and the E.330) had had to leave Italy during the First World War and was trying to regain his lost position through the company Ing Nicola Romeo di Saronno, who until then had only built steam locomotives. The first result of this collaboration was the new Class E.552, commissioned by the FS on 17 January 1920, which was intended to replace further orders for Class E.550.

While the E.552 locomotives were under construction, the company Romeo succeeded in obtaining a contract for 18 locomotives for the haulage of passenger trains on flat or moderately steep lines, which was agreed on 17 January 1922 with deliveries scheduled by May 1924. These were to be E.333.001-018. On 4 October 1922, another 22 units were ordered. These were to be E.333.019-028 and 029-040. The Romeo company, which was financially linked to the Mechanical and Naval Workshops of Naples through Credito Italiano, subcontracted to them the construction of the mechanical parts and the responsibility for the whole supply of E.333.029-040.

The locomotives were divided into two subgroups:

1. 001-014 and 029-034
2. 015-028 and 035-040

The second group was distinguished externally by a higher cab other detail differences.

The E.333 was designed to haul both local and non-stop passenger trains of modest weight on moderately steep lines with a maximum speed of 75 km/h (47 mph) in both directions. This implied driving wheels similar to those of the E.330 and a traction system that developed the greatest tractive effort at the two highest speeds. Four speeds were provided and, with a power frequency of 16.7 Hz, these were 25, 37.5, 50, and 75 km/h (15.5, 23.3, 31.1, and 46.6 mph).

== Construction ==
=== Mechanical part ===
The mechanical part of the E.333 resembled that of the E.330, with a UIC wheel arrangement of 1'C1', large driving wheels and Zara bogies at each end. The adhesive weight was reduced from 51 to 45 tonnes (50 to 44 long tons; 56 to 50 short tons) to reduce axle load and allow use on many lines. The overall design of the machine resembled that of the E.552 and other projects developed by Kandó. These included a long section containing the traction motors with their auxiliaries in the centre, the rheostat at one end and the driver's cab at the other. This provision was advantageous for the accessibility of the equipment and for reduction of the accident risk for train drivers in the event of an explosion of the rheostat (which occurred several times on machines of various classes, with sometimes deadly consequences).

=== Electrical part ===
The electrical part of the E.333 was substantially similar to that of the FS E.552 locomotives. The only notable differences were the presence of cooling fans for the traction motors and a smaller number of rheostat electrodes. The two traction motors were identical to those of the E.552, with an output of 800 kW (1,100 hp) at 75 km/h (47 mph) for each. Foreign patents were not completely eliminated. The stators were wound according to a Kandó patent and the rotors according to a patent by Ottó Titusz Bláthy, one of Kandó's colleagues at Ganz. As with all the locomotives designed by Kandó, the regulation of starting and the transition from one speed to the next was done by an automatically controlled liquid rheostat containing sodium carbonate solution. Four fixed speeds were available by switching between 12 and 8 poles on the motors and using cascade or parallel connections. The fixed speeds were:

- Cascade connection, 25 and 37.5 km/h (15.5 and 23.3 mph)
- Parallel connection, 50 and 75 km/h (31 and 47 mph)

== Modifications ==
The E.333 had the same electrical equipment as the E.552 and reproduced its greatest defect - insufficient tractive effort when starting and at low speeds. Measured values were 96.8 kN (21,800 lbf) at 25 km/h falling to 69.3 kN (15,600 lbf) at 37.5 km/h. The Locomotive Studies Department of the Material and Traction Service of the FS, directed by the engineer Giuseppe Bianchi, proposed to the supplier the elimination of the second fixed speed and the modification of the motors and the rheostat. After some tests in 1926, a tractive effort of 176 kN (40,000 lbf) at 25 km/h was achieved. The modifications were then applied to all the locomotives. As a result of these modifications, the fixed speeds were reduced to three, namely 25, 50 and 75 km/h, and good performance was delivered, especially at the two higher speeds. This made it possible to withdraw from the idea of radically altering or scrapping the whole class. The rheostat designed by Kandó had a pneumatic adjustment of the electrolyte level. Subsequently the FS technicians studied a new rheostat which allowed for exclusively mechanical regulation. This was first applied to the E.333 and later to classes E.432 and E.554 as well.

The machines were delivered with electric steam generators for train heating but these were unsatisfactory. In the 1930s, thirty eight E.333 locomotives were equipped with a new type of boiler. This had been developed by FS in 1924 and applied, with subsequent modifications, to 184 locomotives of various classes.

In 1933-1934 four E.333s stabled at Bolzano and Lecco were equipped with vigilance devices designed and built by Breda for one-man operation. These were also fitted to ten E.550s. This was followed by a device for automatically adjusting the train-heating boiler. The vigilance devices were removed around 1945 because there was union pressure to restore two-man operation as a result of the post-war unemployment situation. After experiments carried out in 1958-1959 on some E.554s, locomotives E.333.025 and 033 were equipped with multiple-unit control devices of the "Genova type" in 1960. However, they were rarely used. There were also some minor changes, such as modification of the inspection doors and moving the lights. In 1927, E333.006 was fitted with pantographs in place of the original Brown-Boveri type trolley poles. This modification was later applied to classes E.432, E.470 and E.472.

== Statistics ==
The E.333s were delivered between September 1923 and December 1924 and, having overcome the initial difficulties, proved to be remarkably efficient machines. First they were assigned to the depots at Alessandria, Genoa (Terralba) and Lecco. Statistics for the second half of the 1930s confirm the reliability of the class. For example E.333.010 of Lecco in 1937-1938 totalled an average of 5,609 km (3,485 mi) of travel per month and of 170,223 km (105,772 mi) between two major overhauls. In the year 1963-1964 the interval between two major overhauls was, for the whole class, 224,545 km (139,526 mi).

== Service ==
In 1927 they were assigned to the Florence depot, to work on the Porrettana railway. They worked the Rome - Milan express trains and almost all the trains between Florence and Pistoia, hauling 440 tonnes (430 long tons; 490 short tons) at 75 km/h (47 mph). From March 1934, some of them were transferred to the Bolzano depot for service on the Bolzano - Trento, Bolzano - Merano and Bolzano - Brennero lines. On these services they were able to haul trains of 480 tonnes (470 long tons; 530 short tons) (a dozen carriages) at 75 km/h.

From 1931, thanks to the electrification of the Savona - Ventimiglia line, they were used extensively on the Ligurian coast line, also hauling prestigious trains composed of Compagnie Internationale des Wagons-Lits cars such as sections of the Milan - Cannes and Cannes - Sanremo services. The services on the Brenner line were also demanding, including the direct trains from Merano to Vienna, Munich and Berlin, or the Bolzano - Merano service with carriages continuing to Rotterdam.

== Depot allocations ==
This list is incomplete.

- 1923-1924, Alessandria, Lecco, Genoa (Terralba)
- 1927-1930, Florence Santa Maria Novella (Romito), between 4 and 11 units
- 1930, Alessandria (11 units), Florence (1 unit), Genoa (Terralba) (13 units), Lecco (15 units)
- 1934, Bolzano (11 units)
- 1953, Alessandria (21 units), Savona (Fornaci) (17 units)

== Losses and withdrawals ==
In 1943 E.333.023 of Bolzano depot was destroyed by bombing. It was then decided to remove many locomotives (including Classes E.432 and E.554) from Bolzano to a subsidiary traction centre in Bronzolo. In 1949, E.333.015 was derailed by a landslide at Malpasso on the Genoa - Ventimiglia line. It was withdrawn and scrapped in 1950.

The conversion of the Brenner, Ligurian and Piedmontese lines from three-phase alternating current to direct current, and the decision to keep in service only classes E.431, E.432 and E.554 led to a constant reduction in the number of E.333 units in service. By 1968, only seven E.333s remained. They were withdrawn and scrapped at Savona (Fornaci) and Verona (Santa Lucia).

== Preservation ==
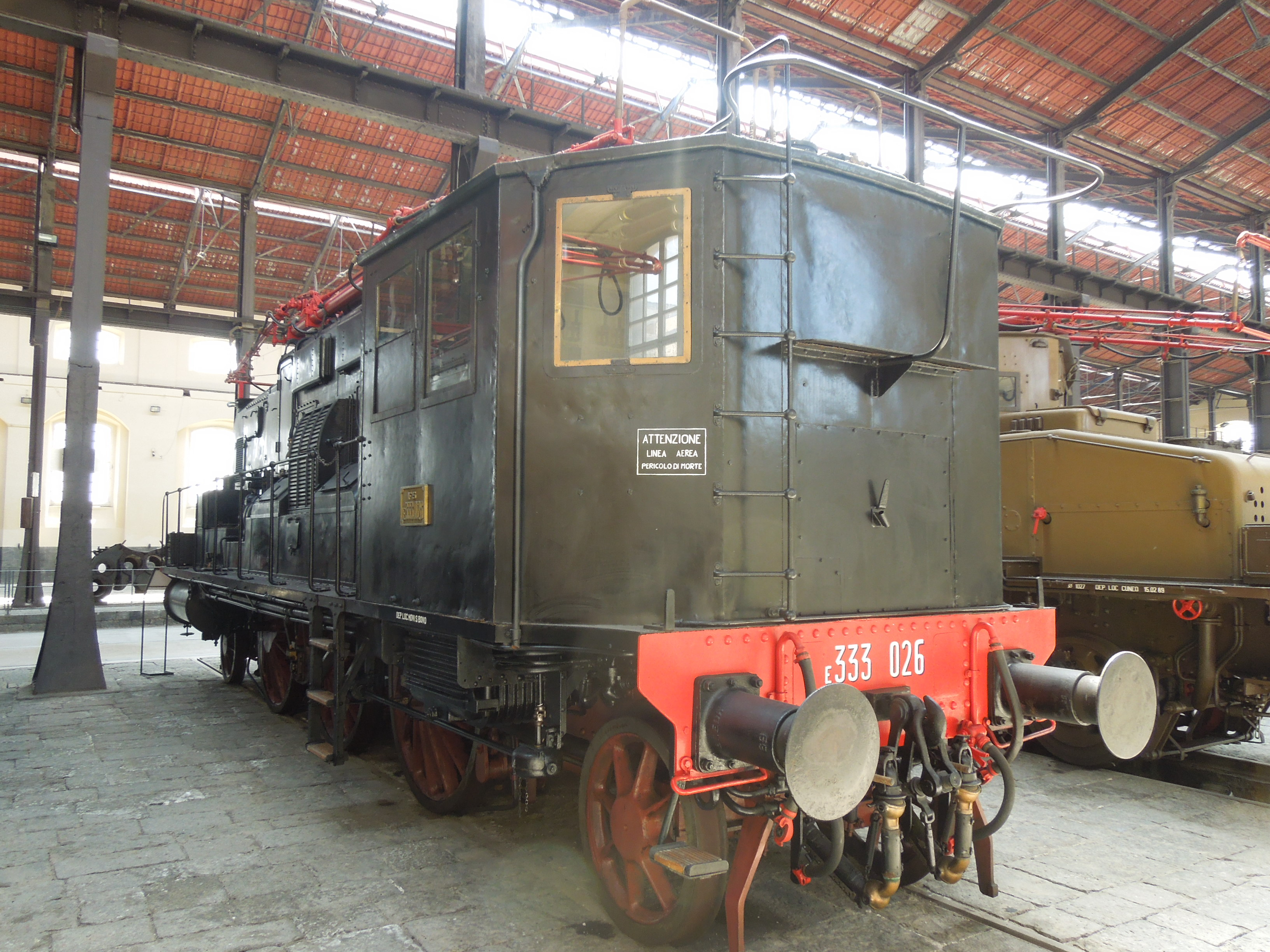
E.333.026 preserved at Pietrarsa

E.333.026 was stored at the Novi Ligure depot (San Bovo) until 1992. It is now exhibited at the National Railway Museum of Pietrarsa.
