= Giuseppe Bianchi (engineer) =

Italian engineer (1888–1969)

Giuseppe Bianchi (26 August 1888 – 20 July 1969 in Milan) was an Italian railway engineer on the Ferrovie dello Stato between 1913 and 1946.

== Life ==
Born in Imola, Bianchi graduated in electrical mechanical engineering at the University of Turin in 1912. Offered a job by Ferrovie dello Stato, the operator of the Italian rail network, he was first assigned to the select committee for the electrification of Rome.

In 1920, Bianchi was transferred to the office for locomotive research within the Servizio materiale e trazione (Rolling Stock and Locomotive Service) at Florence (where it still resides, under a different name). Although Bianchi distinguished himself through projects involving steam locomotives for mainline services (like the three variations of the planned Class 695 for Ferrovie dello Stato, as well as the Class 691 obtained by rebuilding the Class 690), his work was central to the transition from steam to electric power.

As the limitations of using three-phase alternating current electrification became evident, and after examining the possibilities offered by direct current of 3 kV (as did some railways in the United States), Bianchi concentrated on this system of electrification. Already during the first part of his career he had contributed to improve electric locomotives run on three-phase alternating current (3.6 kV, 16.7 Hz), and subsequently directed the planning of new locomotive types, the E432 (FS) and E554. His office also directed the development of the E326, E626, E428, and E424. The E424 was not built, but Bianchi's successor built this class of the same name starting in 1943 based on the class E636).

Mainstream historiography holds that the change of the heads of the Railroads of the State after Fascism's partial takeover of power may have contributed to defeating internal resistance within Ferrovie dello Stato to using direct current. Nevertheless, Bianchi refused to subscribe to the fascist party and was always troublesome, if not explicitly opposed to the regime.

The initial failure of his attempts to reach high speeds with his locomotives and with the electric trains ETR 200 allowed his political and industrial opponents to get him dismissed from the assignment in 1937. He was transferred to Ferrovie Nord Milano, where he ran the complete electrification of the network and stayed on until retirement, except for a brief stint working again with the FS, from 1945 to 1946.

== Works ==
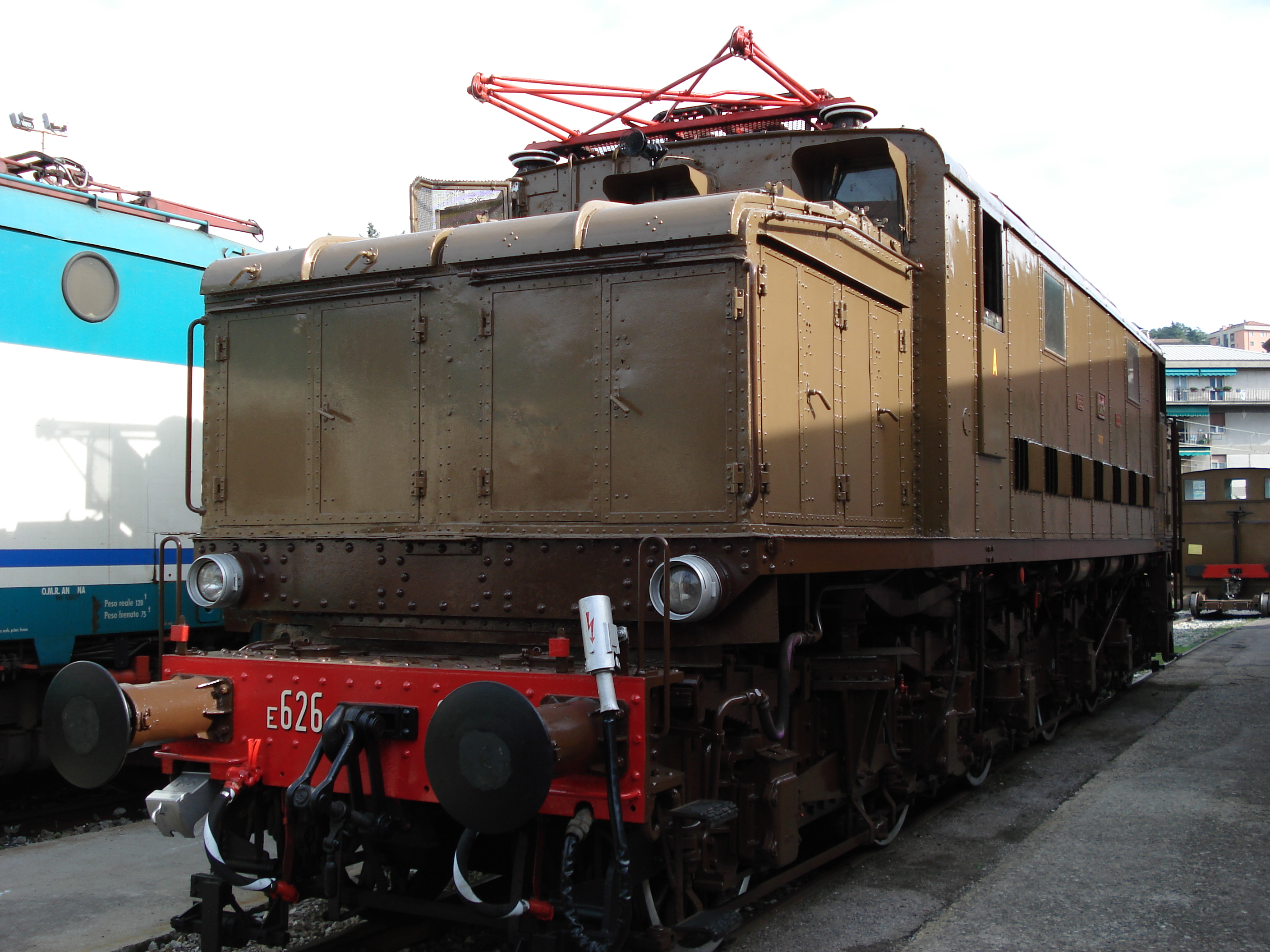
An E626 locomotive.

Bianchi proposed the creation of four different roles for locomotives in order to specialise maintenance services more than had previously been possible. This strategy of specialisation was not entirely new, but at that time, the depot system was very heterogeneous: inherited from the different railroad administrations left over after the 1905 birth of the national railway system, it had many different engines carrying out the same task, making management and maintenance burdensome.

The four roles Bianchi proposed were:

- Locomotive for swift trains. He designated the E326 for this task, which later proved ill-suited for these high speeds.
- Locomotive for heavy trains, for which he designated the E428.
- Locomotive "multiruolo" (multi-role), assigned to the E626.
- Locomotive for light trains, except for powerful and costly high-altitude routes. He saw only the (predecessor of the 1943) E424 as suitable.

Bianchi fully understood the necessity of a high standard of service and maintenance for the railcars under his jurisdiction, which were then still highly prone to mechanical breakdowns due to the newness of the technologies used. To meet this requirement, in 1928, he introduced the theory of 'Interoperabilità' (interoperability): all the technical components of the locomotives should be simplified in their planning stages (in favour of reliability) and of a single standardised design to make finding spare parts easier. These guidelines represented a philosophy whose concept was very close to that of the 1950s, spread amongst industry in general under the names "Design for maintenance" and "Reliable system design".

These design choices were carried over to the characteristic "Bianchi Line" inspired by the locomotives and systems already used in Switzerland. His locomotives were composed of a heavy, rigid chassis, a central box and two small projections, one for each side. These projections, though reduced, continued to characterise new Italian engines until the introduction of the E424, in service until the 1990s. They also influenced the development of the E636, which were built from 1940 to 1962 and were one of the most numerous Italian locomotive groups, not decommissioned until 2006.

== Sources ==
- Mario Loria, Storia della trazione elettrica ferroviaria in Italia Firenze, Giunti-Barbèra, 1971
- Erminio Mascherpa, Locomotive da battaglia: storia del Gruppo E.626 Salò, Editrice Trasporti su Rotaie, 1989, ISBN 88-85068-03-0
- Erminio Mascherpa, Locomotive da corsa: storia del Gruppo E.326 Salò : Editrice Trasporti su Rotaie, 1993, ISBN 88-85068-06-5
- Erminio Mascherpa, E.471: locomotive di sogno Rovereto : Nicolodi editore, 2005, ISBN 88-8447-199-0

The main articles by Bianchi on his resolution of problems of electric traction are cited in the books of Mario Loria and Erminio Mascherpa.
