= E428 =

The term E428 has more than one meaning

- E428 is the European code for food additives assigned to Gelatin
- E.428 is the number of a class of Italian rail locomotives, FS Class E.428

== See also ==
- E numbers
