= CEMSA =

CEMSA (Construzioni Elettro Meccaniche di Saronno) was an Italian engineering company which operated from 1925 to 1948.

== History ==
CEMSA was founded in Saronno in 1925 by engineer Nicola Romeo and backed by Credito Italiano. It used the former factory of Costruzioni Meccaniche di Saronno which had closed in 1918. In 1935, after a series of writedowns of the share capital, the company was bought by Istituto per la Ricostruzione Industriale (IRI) and the following year it was sold to the aeronautical engineer Gianni Caproni who already controlled Isotta Fraschini.

During World War II, CEMSA built light weapons and, at the end of the war, the company started producing cars thanks to collaboration with the engineer Antonio Fessia,Antonio_Fessia who in 1946 had left FIAT. In a few months Fessia, who had transformed CEMSA into a company dedicated to the construction of sports cars, succeeded in designing a car with innovative technical characteristics, the CEMSA Caproni F.11, which was presented at the Paris Salon in 1947. Only 10 sedan cars of this model were produced. A cabriolet version was also planned but it was not realized due to the financial crisis that hit the company in 1948 and forced it to close. One of the prototypes of the F.11 was shipped to the United States, in the hope of concluding an agreement with the Tucker sales network for the distribution of the model in the US, but this project did not come to fruition because of the closure of the company. In 1953, the Belgian company, Minerva, bought an F.11 in an attempt to put it into production, but even this project failed.

== The car ==
The F.11 was designed by Antonio Fessia and had revolutionary technical characteristics. These included a 4-cylinder boxer engine which was cantilevered with respect to the front axle, steering column gear change, front suspension with transverse leaf spring and front wheel drive. All these innovations were later incorporated into the 1960 Lancia Flavia, also designed by Fessia. The body design was by the company's technicians and was styled by Bertone. When CEMSA closed, most of the ten cars were dispersed but one F.11, in excellent condition, survives on display at the Volandia museum.

== Railway rolling stock ==
=== Steam locomotives ===
Examples of steam locomotives built by CEMSA include:

Class	Wheels	Railway	Date built	Number built	Notes
FCL 500	2-6-2	Ferrovie Calabro Lucane	1930-1932	6	Locomotiva_FCL_500 Ferrovie_Calabro_Lucane
FNM 280	4-6-0	Ferrovie Nord Milano	1925-1927	4	Locomotiva_FNM_280
FNM 290	2-6-4T	Ferrovie Nord Milano	1931	4	Locomotiva_FNM_290

=== Railcars ===
In 1924 a delegation of FS officials, at the Seddin railway station in Berlin, took an interest in some German railcars during a railway convention. They were two-axle vehicles driven by Benz engines. The 6-cylinder Otto cycle engines with carburettors were fuelled by benzole. The transmission comprised a clutch and mechanical gearbox. In the same year, the Romeo company of Milan obtained the construction license and put it into operation in the new CEMSA factory in Saronno, launching series production. The FS ordered three units, fuelled by a mixture of naphtha and petrol with the application of a special patented carburettor by Aliverti, although two were actually built in Germany. The units were:

- C.8701, later N.8701, of 160 bhp
- C.8801-02, later N.8801-02 of 100 bhp.

Two other units were purchased by the Italian Railway and Tramway Company and by the Compagnie des Chemins de Fer du Midi de Italie (CFMT) which operated the Ferrovia Alifana.

=== Electric locomotives ===
Electric locomotives built by CEMSA included:

Class	Wheels	Railway	Date built	Number built	Notes
FAV Class E.440	D	Ferrovia Alta Valtellina (FAV)	1932	3	
FS Class E.333	1-C-1	Ferrovie dello Stato (FS)	1922-1924	40	(1)
FS Class E.471	1-D-1	FS	1928	1	
FS Class E.552	E	FS	1922-1923	15	(1)
FS Class E.554	E	FS	1928-1930	183	
FS Class E.626	Bo-Bo-Bo	FS	1927-1939	?	

Notes

1. It appears that some locomotives attributed to CEMSA were built by Nicola Romeo before 1925.
