= FAV Class E.440 =

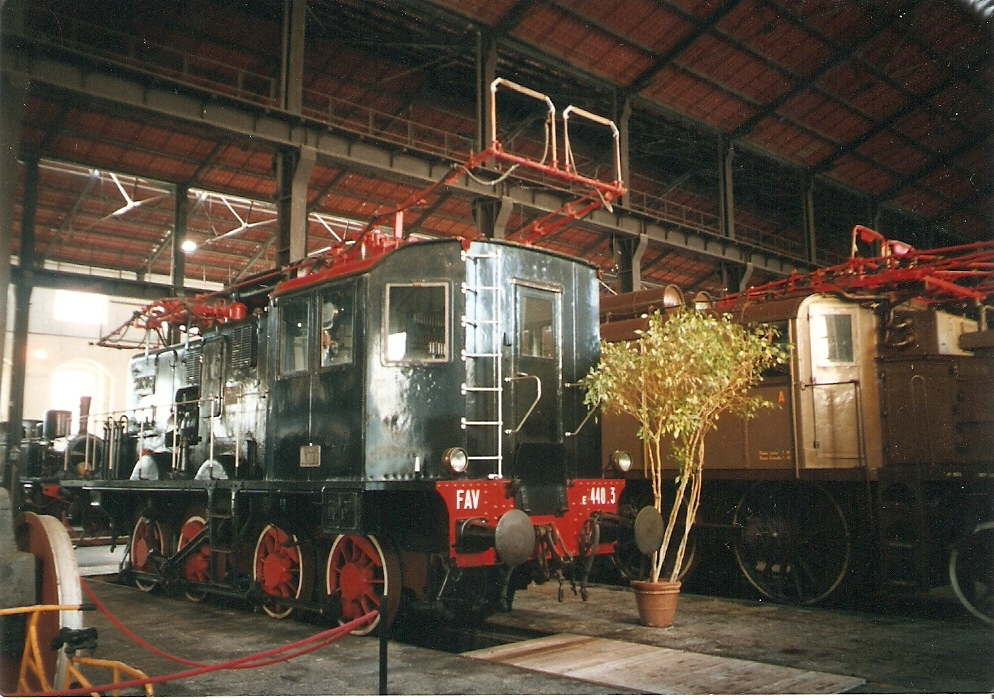
- FAV E.440.3 preserved at the National Railway Museum of Pietrarsa
Type and origin
- Power type: Electric
- Builder: 1-3, CEMSA; 4, OM and TIBB
- Build date: 1932
- Total produced: 4
Specifications
- Configuration
  - Whyte: 0-8-0OE
  - AAR: D
  - UIC: D
- Gauge: 1,435 mm (4 ft 8 1/2 in) standard gauge
- Electric system/s: Three-phase AC; 3,600V, 16.7 Hz
- Current pickup: overhead line
Performance figures
- Maximum speed: 50 km/h (31 mph)
- Power output: 1,000 kW (1,300 hp)
Career
- Operators: FAV

FAV Class E.440 was a class of four electric locomotives built for the Italian Ferrovia Alta Valtellina (FAV) in 1932 for the operation between Sondrio and Tirano.

== History ==
In 1928, following the experience acquired in the three-phase high-voltage (10 kV) AC operation on the Rome - Sulmona line of the Ferrovie dello Stato (FS), a new locomotive, dual-voltage and dual-frequency, with a wheel arrangement of 1'D1' and a power output of 3,270 kW (4,390 hp), was designed and registered as FS Class E.471. It was designed by the famous engineer Kalman Kando and was built in the CEMSA plant. Ten locomotives were ordered but the project was terminated prematurely and only one locomotive was completed. The early termination of the project caused severe economic difficulties for CEMSA so the company welcomed an order for four locomotives from FAV. It has been suggested that one of the FAV locomotives was a rebuild of E.471 but this seems unlikely because E.471 was a large 1'D1' machine while the FAV locomotives were relatively small D types. What is more likely is that some parts manufactured for the cancelled FS order were used in the construction of the FAV locomotives. The first three units, E.440.1-2-3 were delivered in 1932 but the fourth, E.440.4, had to be built by Officine Meccaniche (OM) and Tecnomasio Italiano-Brown-Boveri (TIBB) following the economic difficulties of CEMSA. The locomotives served on the line between Sondrio and Tirano until 1967, when they were withdrawn and replaced by diesel-powered trains.

== Technical details ==
The E.440 locomotives were the only three-phase Italian machines to have the "D" wheel arrangement. Current collection was by trolley poles with dual spades. There was a single asynchronous motor of 1,000 kW (1,300 hp) (1 hour rating). The motion was transmitted to the wheels by articulated connecting rods using the Kando system with an idle jackshaft. Two fixed speeds of 33 and 50 km/h (21 and 31 mph) were available by pole-changing (Kando-Blathy system). The locomotive had a rigid frame and the axle at the cab end had side play of 40 mm (1.6 in). The livery was black.

== Preservation ==
By the 1980s, three units had been scrapped. E.440.3, restored in the workshops at Tirano, was sent to the National Railway Museum of Pietrarsa where it is exhibited.
