= FS Class 685 =

Italian class of railway locomotives

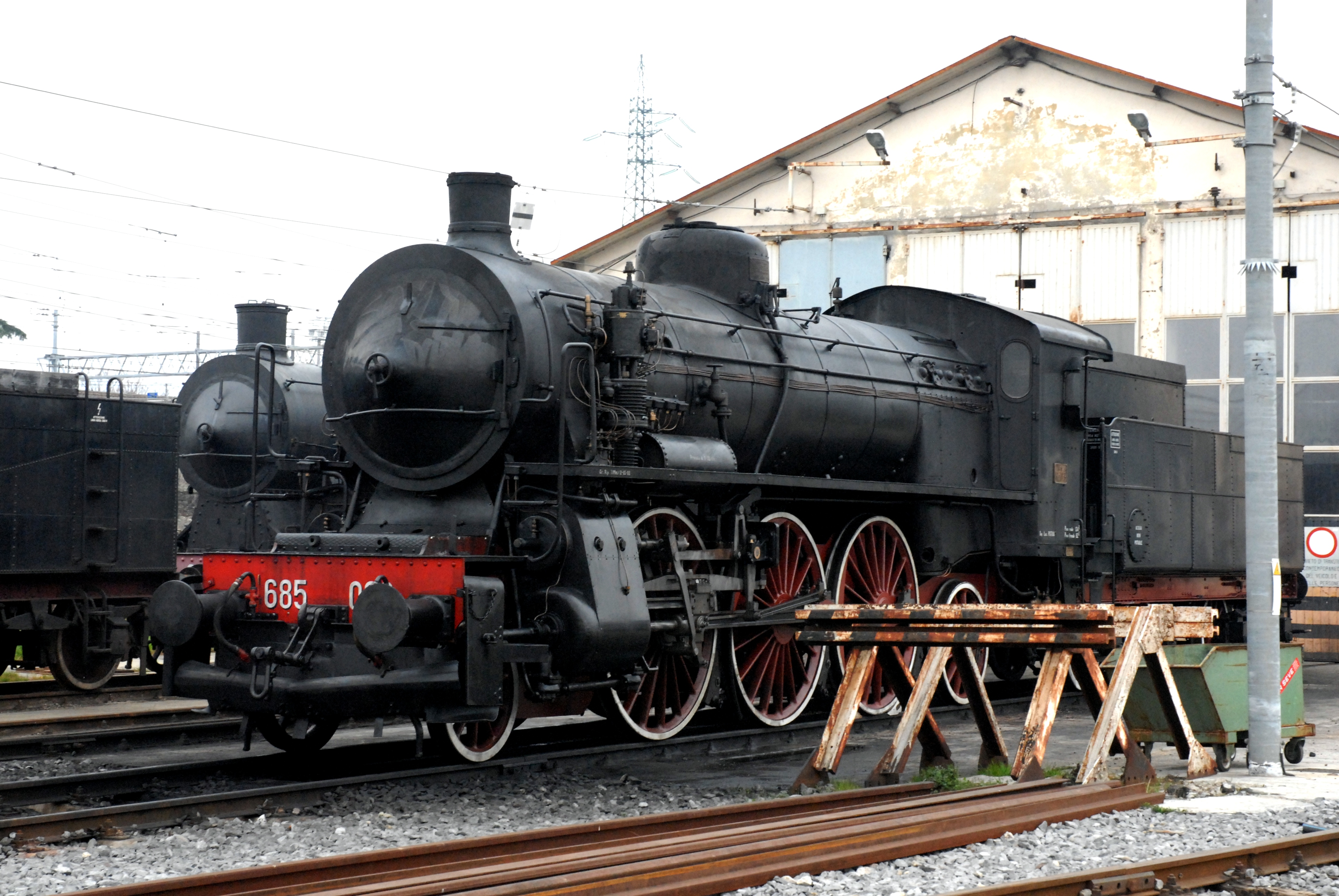
- FS locomotive 685.089 in 2010
Type and origin
- Power type: Steam
- Builder: Ernesto Breda (221); CEMSA (20), Officine Meccaniche, Milan (10); Officine Meccaniche e Navali (10); Reggiane (10)
- Build date: 1912–1928
- Total produced: 271 + 120 rebuilds
Specifications
- Configuration
  - UIC: 1′C1′ h4
- Gauge: 1,435 mm (4 ft 8 1/2 in) standard gauge
- Leading dia.: 960 mm (3 ft 1 3/4 in)
- Driver dia.: 1,850 mm (6 ft 7/8 in)
- Trailing dia.: 1,220 mm (4 ft 0 in)
- Length: 11,730 mm (38 ft 5 3/4 in)
- Axle load: 15.1 tonnes (14.9 long tons; 16.6 short tons)
- Loco weight: 70.8 tonnes (69.7 long tons; 78.0 short tons)
- Tender weight: 48.6 tonnes (47.8 long tons; 53.6 short tons)
- Fuel type: Coal
- Fuel capacity: 6,000 kg (13,000 lb)
- Water cap.: 22 m^{3} (4,840 imp gal; 5,810 US gal)
- Firebox
  - Grate area: 3.5 m^{2} (38 sq ft)
- Boiler pressure: 12 kg/cm^{2} (11.8 bar; 171 psi)
- Heating surface: 191.8 m^{2} (2,065 sq ft)
- Superheater
  - Heating area: 48.54 m^{2} (522.5 sq ft)
- Cylinders: Four, simple
- Cylinder size: 420 mm × 650 mm (16 9/16 in × 25 9/16 in)
- Valve gear: Walschaerts (early production), Caprotti (late production)
Performance figures
- Maximum speed: 120 km/h (75 mph)
- Power output: 1,250 CV (919 kW; 1,230 hp)
- Tractive effort: 11,300 kgf (111 kN; 24,900 lbf)
Career
- Operators: Ferrovie dello Stato

The Ferrovie dello Stato (FS; Italian State Railways) Class 685 (Italian: Gruppo 685) is a class of 2-6-2 'Prairie' express train steam locomotives. These are colloquially known as Regine ('Queens' in Italian), mirroring their fame as one of the most successful and appreciated Italian steam locomotives.

== Design and construction ==
The Class 685 was the simple-expansion and superheated version of the pre-existing FS Class 680 locomotive, the premier express locomotive in Italy up to that date; while discarding the complicated compound feature, the 685 nonetheless kept the unusual feature of having the cylinders arranged in pairs, with each pair being served by a single piston valve with crossed ports (a feature typical of the Plancher engine of the Class 680 and other Italian locomotives).

The first 106 locomotives were built up to World War I, and had right-hand drive; construction resumed in 1920, and the remaining 165 were all built, up to 1928, with left-hand drive and a slightly longer boiler. Of the latter, 30 were built from the beginning with Caprotti valve gear, after it had been tested first on a FS Class 740 locomotive and then on other four 685 locomotives; all of these were initially reclassified as FS Class 686 locomotives, but were later placed again into the Class 685.

== Operations ==
The Class 685 was present on all the Italian mainlines before their electrification, thanks to its good performance related to its moderate axle load. It was renowned as a well-balanced design, especially for its very smooth riding qualities, and was almost universally appreciated. Despite being express locomotives, especially in the waning years of the Italian steam they proved to be apt for freight train pulling as well.

The maximum authorised speed for the Class 685 locomotives was originally 110 km/h (68 mph) and from 1932, it was raised to 120 km/h (75 mph).

The first units to be withdrawn from service, in the mid-1960s, were the heavier S.685 locomotives, and the more maintenance-requiring Caprotti and Franco-Crosti locomotives; the last unit in active service, the 685.222, was withdrawn in early 1975.

== Conversions ==
=== Rebuilds from the 680 class ===
The by then-obsolete FS Class 680 locomotives were first subjected to a first rebuild, in which 91 of them were superheated but kept the compound engine (with some of them receiving a larger high pressure (HP) cylinder); after it was determined that these locomotives were still inferior in terms of performance and water and coal consumption, it was decided to rebuild them into Class 685 locomotives, instead.

The first group of 31 locomotives, renumbered as 685.3XX, received the superheater and a simple-expansion engine, while keeping the original boiler pressure of 16 kg/cm^{2} (15.7 bar; 228 psi); they resulted in being even more powerful than the original Class 685s, thanks to their higher boiler pressure. A further group of 40 locomotives, with the new classification of 685.5XX, also received the Caprotti valve gear, and had a boiler that achieved even higher steam temperatures, to further improve their efficiency; some even received an exhaust injector.

=== Class S.685 ===
FS Class S.685
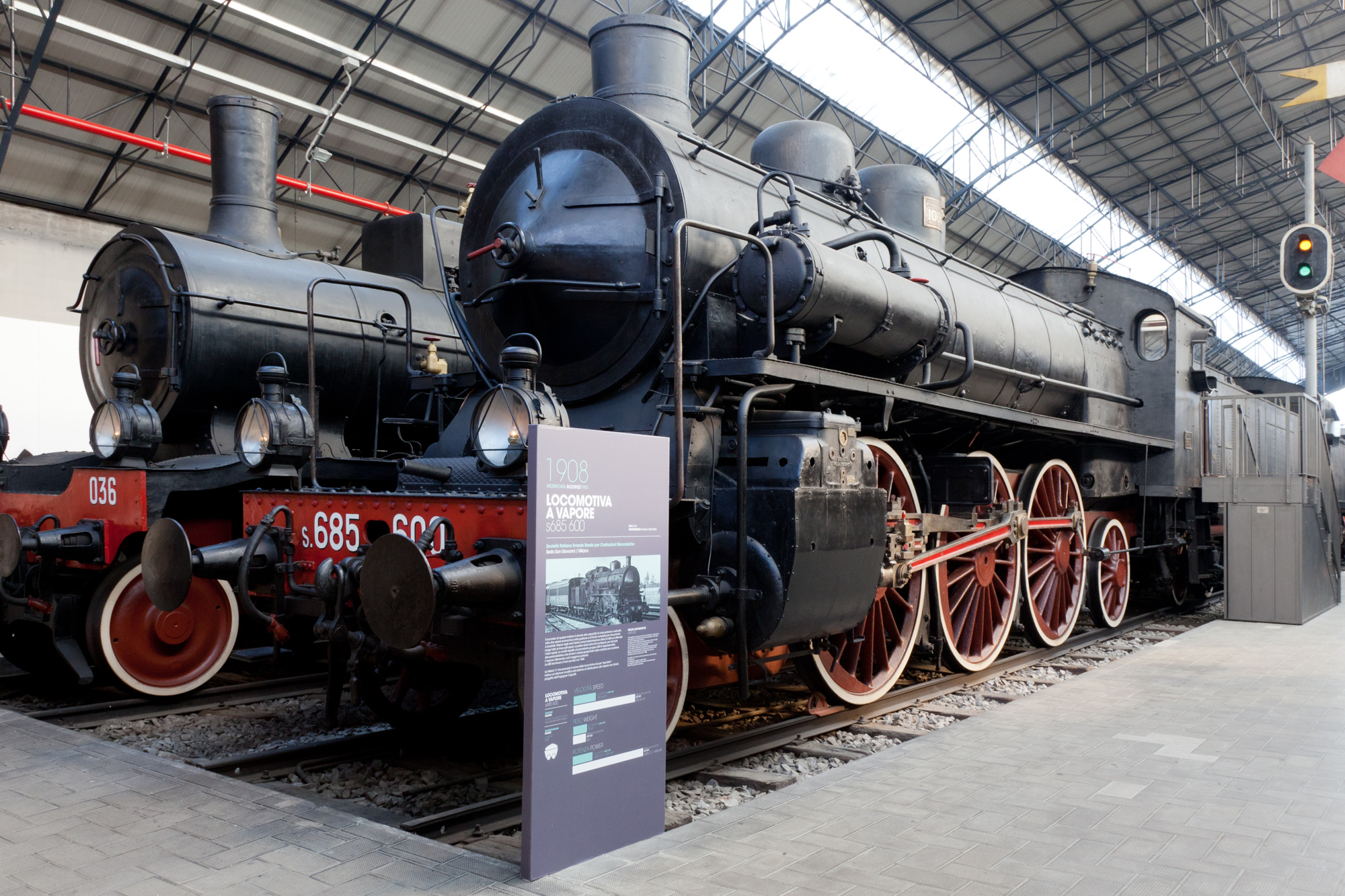
- FS locomotive S.685.600 as preserved
Type and origin
- Power type: Steam
- Total produced: 50
- Rebuilder: Ernesto Breda, Officine Meccaniche, FS Pietrarsa Works
- Rebuild date: 1929-1934
Specifications
- Configuration
  - UIC: 1′C1′ h4
- Gauge: 1,435 mm (4 ft 8 1/2 in)
- Leading dia.: 960 mm (3 ft 1 3/4 in)
- Driver dia.: 1,850 mm (6 ft 7/8 in)
- Trailing dia.: 1,220 mm (4 ft 0 in)
- Length: 11,730 mm (38 ft 5 3/4 in)
- Axle load: 17 tonnes (17 long tons; 19 short tons)
- Loco weight: 73.4 tonnes (72.2 long tons; 80.9 short tons)
- Tender weight: 54.1 tonnes (53.2 long tons; 59.6 short tons)
- Fuel type: Coal
- Fuel capacity: 5,500 kilograms (12,100 lb)
- Water cap.: 29 m^{3} (6,380 imp gal; 7,660 US gal)
- Firebox
  - Grate area: 3.5 square metres (38 sq ft)
- Boiler pressure: 16 kg/cm^{2} (15.7 bar; 228 psi)
- Heating surface: 188.74 square metres (2,031.6 sq ft)
- Cylinders: 4, simple
- Cylinder size: 420 mm × 650 mm (16 9/16 in × 25 9/16 in)
- Valve gear: Caprotti
Performance figures
- Maximum speed: 120 km/h (75 mph)
- Power output: 1,350 CV (993 kW; 1,330 hp)
- Tractive effort: 11,800 kgf (116 kN; 26,000 lbf)
Career
- Operators: Ferrovie dello Stato

The last batch of rebuilds, intended to serve on major lines on which the original axle load limits had been rescinded, were therefore subjected to an increase of their adhesive weight (by shifting the pivots of the Italian bogie and the trailing axle towards the driving axles) to improve performance, bringing their axle load up to 17 tons, and, taking advantage of the more relaxed weight limits, were fitted with a Knorr pre-heater; some of them also received a larger tender with a total water capacity of 29,000 L (7,700 US gal), used by the FS Class 691. In total, 49 were rebuilt until 1933, while in 1934 a 685.500, was further converted into a S.685. Based on their increased performance (comparable or, in some cases, even superior to the larger FS Class 690 Pacifics), they were classified as the separate Class S.685 ('S' standing for Speciale).

The Class S.685 locomotives mainly operated on the Milan-Venice, Milan-Turin and Rome-Naples (through Cassino) mainlines, especially on the former together with the FS Class 691. After these lines were electrified, respectively in 1958 and 1961, their increased axle load and maintenance needs led to their withdrawal by 1968.

In total, 120 ex-Class 680 locomotives were eventually rebuilt, until 1933, bringing the total number of locomotives in the Class to 391.

=== Franco-Crosti ===
In 1939 five locomotives (amongst those fitted with Caprotti valve gear) were rebuilt with Franco-Crosti boilers; initially classified into the Class S.685, in 1951 they were reclassified as FS Class 683.

=== Turbine locomotive ===
In 1933 the locomotive 685.410 had her cylinders replaced by a large forward motion steam turbine and a smaller reverse turbine; this experiment, under the guidance of renowned engineer Giuseppe Belluzzo, was completely unsuccessful, and the locomotive was restored to its previous condition in 1934.

== Preservation ==
Five Class 685 locomotives survive into preservation:

- The 685.089 and 196 are currently operational;
- The 685.068 is a static exhibit at the Pietrarsa railway museum;
- The S.685.600 (the 1000th locomotive built by the Ernesto Breda company) is a static exhibit at the Museo della Scienza e della Tecnologia "Leonardo da Vinci";
- The 685.222 is used as a source for spare parts at Pistoia.

== Bibliography ==
- Cornolò, Giovanni (July 2014). "Locomotive a vapore". TuttoTreno (3).
- Kalla-Bishop, P. M. (1986). Italian State Railways Steam Locomotives. Abingdon: Tourret Publishing. pp. 58–60. ISBN 0-905878-03-5.
- Mascherpa, Erminio; Turchi, Gian Guido (1984). La regina delle locomotive. Salò: Editrice trasporti su rotaie. ISBN 88-85068-02-2.
