= FS Class E.326 =

Italian series of electric locomotives

FS class E.326
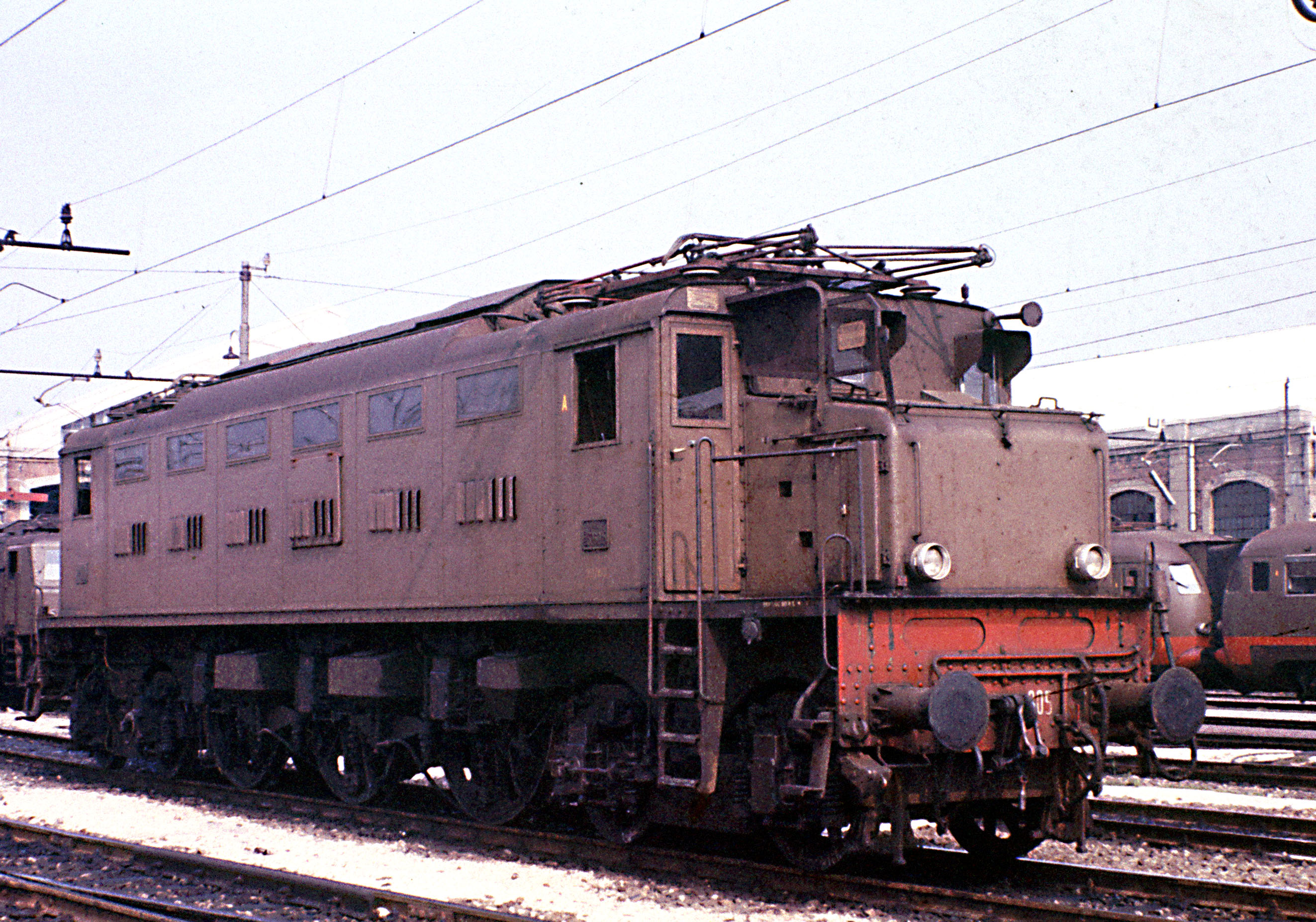
Type and origin
- Power type: Electric
- Builder: Società Italiana Ernesto Breda
- Build date: 1930–1933
Specifications
- Configuration
  - AAR: 2-C-2
  - UIC: 2′Co2′
  - Commonwealth: 2-Co-2
- Gauge: 1,435 mm (4 ft 8 1/2 in) standard gauge
- Wheel diameter: 2.050 m (80.71 in) (driving wheels)
- Wheelbase: 5 m (16 ft 5 in) between outer axles
- Length: 16.300 m (53 ft 6 in); Units 1 and 2 were 16 m (52 ft 6 in) long
- Loco weight: 114.4 tonnes (112.6 long tons; 126.1 short tons)
- Electric system/s: 3000 V DC overhead line
- Current pickup(s): Pantograph
- Traction motors: DC series
- Transmission: 29/103 gear ratio
Performance figures
- Maximum speed: 130 km/h (81 mph), later limited to 90 km/h (56 mph)
- Power output: 2,100 kW (2,800 hp)
Career
- Operators: Ferrovie dello Stato
- Number in class: 12
- First run: 1930
- Disposition: Decommissioned in December 1982

The FS E.326 was a class of Italian railways electric locomotives. Designed in 1929, they were introduced in the early 1930s, for hauling light express passenger trains at high speeds.

== History ==
The E.326 was part of family of locomotives designed under engineer Giuseppe Bianchi in the 1920s and in 1930s for Italy's state railways, which, through the use of a great number of standardized components, would mean benefits such as reduced maintenance costs, easier repairs and more familiarity of the personnel. These included the E.428, designed for heavy passenger trains, the E.626, for heavy freight and passenger trains on secondary lines, and the E.326, for hauling light, fast passenger trains. The design reflected contemporary steam engine practice, with six large driving wheels and two bogies. The concept of the locomotive may have been inspired by Vincent Raven's NER No. 13 prototype. The E.326 had six motors, like the E.626. It was designed and built before the eight-motor E.428.

The FS ordered two prototypes from Società Italiana Ernesto Breda on 5 March 1929, which were outshopped respectively in July and December 1930. After the first successful trials on the Foggia-Benevento line (then the only FS line electrified at 3 kV DC), a series of 10 production locomotives was ordered in December 1930, and they were outshopped from November 1932 to January 1933, with some minor improvements. In 1933 the FS designed another series of E.326, which would have sported smaller driving wheels (identical to those of the E.428) and modified auxiliaries, but the better performance of the E.428 and the ETR.200 project meant that they were not built.

During the tests on the Bologna-Florence line (then being completed), one of the locomotives, having a nominal maximum output of 2,100 kW (2,800 hp), managed to reach a top speed of 140 km/h (87 mph), although the certified top speed was set at 130 km/h (81 mph). Officially, the top speed permitted on any line was still 120 km/h (75 mph). The E.326 worked on the Bologna-Florence line from its opening on 22 April 1934, hauling express trains.

In April 1935 four locomotives were re-assigned to the Naples shed, for service on the new Rome-Naples line, and by July 1936 all twelve had been concentrated in Rome. However, both the E.326 and the E.428 suffered poor riding at speed that forced a temporary reduction of their top speed to 105 km/h (65 mph). The E.428's issues were successfully solved, but those of the E.326 (which also tended to derail when going through a crossing switch) lingered. The FS tested several modifications to the chassis, including radically modifying the bogies, reducing the central driving wheel flanges and fitting pneumatic cylinders to the bogies, but the irregularities remained and so did the reduction to their top speed. These issues, together with the increased availability of the E.428, and the appearance of the ETR.200 for long-distance express trains, meant that from 1936 the E.326 were largely relegated to secondary services, and were reassigned to Bologna.

During World War II, all 12 units were damaged by Allied bombings. They were repaired in the Foligno workshop (except 006, repaired at Bologna), and returned to service in 1949 with a simplified electrical arrangement (similar to that of the more recent E.626). Despite further tests to improve their mechanical behaviour, the E.326's top speed was further reduced to 90 km/h (56 mph) in 1963. They hauled mostly local passenger trains to Padua, Piacenza and Ancona. The E.326s were slated for withdrawal in March 1979, and by December 1982 all were out of service, with the last one active being E.326.005.

== Preservation ==
After withdrawal, E.326.004 was thoroughly repaired and repainted, and is currently statically preserved in the Pietrarsa railway museum, near Naples.

== Bibliography ==
- Mascherpa, Erminio (1993). Locomotive da corsa: storia del Gruppo E.326. Salò: Editrice Trasporti su Rotaie. ISBN 88-85068-06-5.
- Pocaterra, Renzo (2003). Treni. Novara: Istituto Geografico De Agostini.
