= Costruzioni Meccaniche di Saronno =

Italian vehicle company

Costruzioni Meccaniche di Saronno was an Italian company producing steam locomotives and cars, active from 1887 to 1918.

== Origins ==
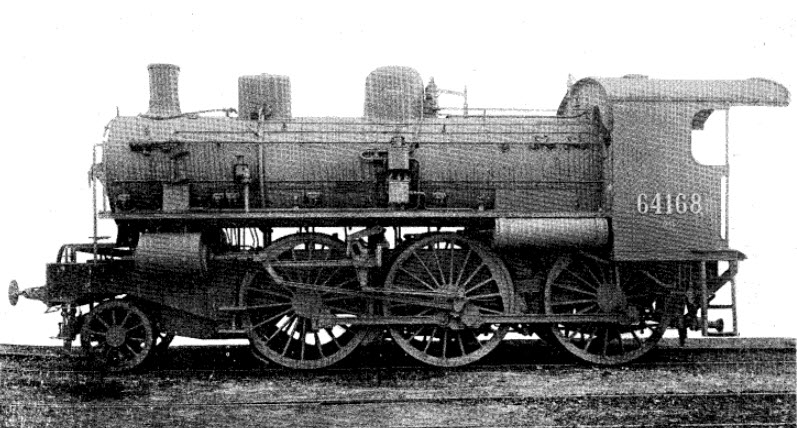

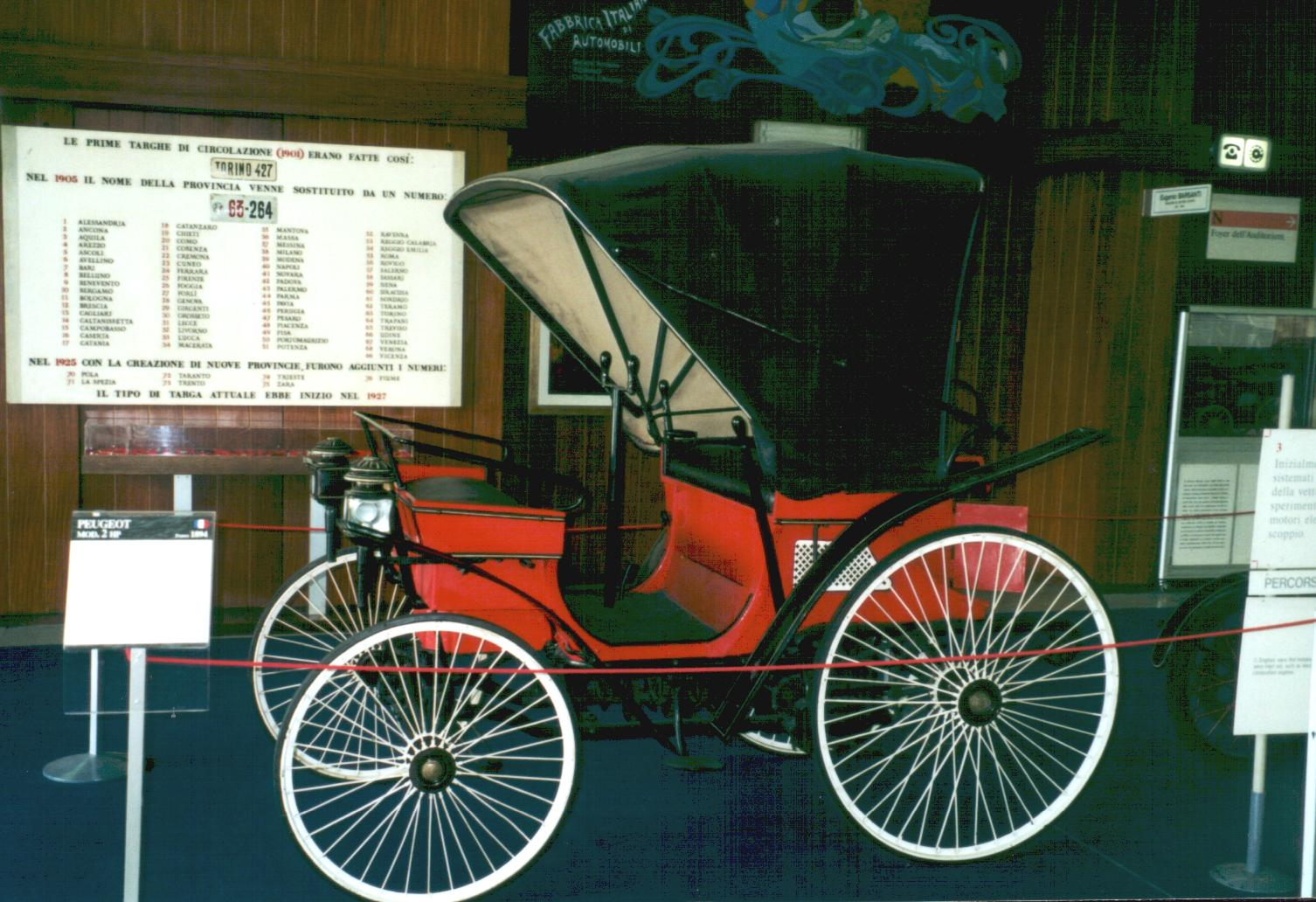

The origins of the engineering company are to be found in a framework of political agreements of the economic-military alliance assumed by the Kingdom of Italy, the German Empire and the Austro-Hungarian Empire in the early 1880s. Favoured by these international cooperation agreements, the German company Maschinenfabrik Esslingen founded the Costruzioni Meccaniche di Saronno in the Varese municipality and began to manufacture its renowned steam locomotives in Italy.

== Production ==
Between 1887 and 1913, the company built steam locomotives of various track gauges for a number of railway companies. Beginning in 1894, it began assembling Peugeot Type 3 cars, produced under a Peugeot license and with engines supplied by the French company.

== World War I ==
During the First World War, the company converted to war production. At the end of the conflict the company, until then predominantly backed by German capital, was acquired by the engineer Nicola Romeo with backing from a Swiss bank, but it appears that Romeo closed the plant in 1918 and did not revive it until 1925.

== Nicola Romeo ==
In 1911 Nicola Romeo (later the owner of Alfa Romeo) founded the limited partnership Ing. Nicola Romeo e Co. for the production of mining machinery. The company soon began to specialize in the production of railway rolling stock, taking advantage of the opportunities offered by the emerging internal combustion engine technology to license some of the first Italian railcars. After some years of inactivity, Romeo re-started the Costruzioni Meccaniche plant as CEMSA in 1925.

== See also ==
- Costruzioni Meccaniche di Saronno locomotives
