= Officine Ferroviarie Meridionali =

Italian railway manufacturing company

Officine Ferroviarie Meridionali – OFM
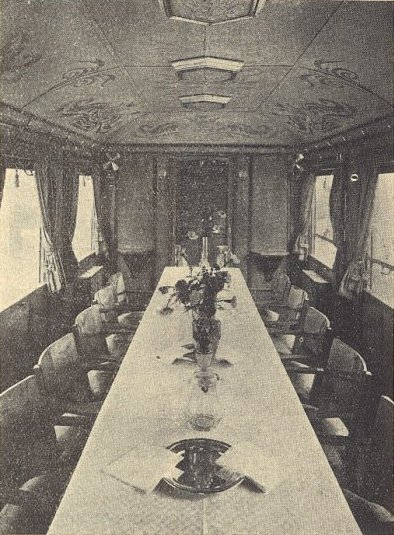
- Private carriage of the Companhia dos Caminhos de Ferro do Norte de Portugal (Portuguese Northern Railways Company). It was part of a lot that was built by the Officine Ferroviarie Meridionali, of Naples, and delivered in September 1931.
- Company type: Railway and Aircraft manufacturer
- Founded: 1904
- Defunct: 1936
- Successor: IMAM
- Headquarters: Naples, Italy
- Number of locations: Naples
- Area served: Worldwide
- Key people: Nicola Romeo, Alessandro Tonini, Giovanni Galasso
- Products: locomotives, airplanes, sailplanes, trams

Officine Ferroviarie Meridionali or OFM was an Italian railway and rolling stock manufacturing company based at Naples, Italy.

== History ==
In 1915, Ing Nicola Romeo and Co Ltd, owned by Nicola Romeo, bought Officine Ferroviarie Meridionali and two other factories producing railway locomotives and other rolling stock (one was in Rome and another one in Saronno) to support his automobile activities and his dream about aviation and airplanes.

By 1922, the OFM factory was only producing railway locomotives and similar rolling stock parts. Nicola Romeo following closely the success of Fiat, he considered that the OFM Naples factory and its workforce was suitable to be trained in order to produce aircraft parts and even a plane. The first aircraft parts constructed by OFM were for a Fiat contract and production started shortly. As Fiat's factories were fully employed with other projects, OFM produced in 1923 the sesquiplane Fiat CR.1 fighter as a sub-manufacturer. In parallel he was entrusted by the Banca Italiana di Sconto with managing its Anonima Lombarda Fabbrica Automobili (ALFA), into which in 1918 he merged OFM to create Alfa Romeo. While this quickly became one of the world's most famous automakers, the collapse of Banca Italiana di Sconto led Romeo to reacquire OFM. Through this he entered the aviation business in 1925 under the OFM – Aeroplani Romeo brand.

Obsessed with his aviation factory dream, Nicola Romeo hired Alessandro Tonini as OFM's chief designer. Tonini had a great experience in aerodynamics and airplane design as he had worked at Macchi on the flying boat fighter designs. OFM contacted Fokker and got production licence for the Fokker C.V. It was built by the Naples factory in 1927 as the OFM Ro.1. With the Ro.1 production line established, OFM turned its attention to its own first designs such as the Ro.1 Ridotto.

Nicola Romeo significantly changed the organisation of the company on October 27, 1934, by splitting the OFM railway workshop and the aircraft business, creating, or possibly just officially recognising the aviation company as Societa Anonima Industrie Aeronautiche Romeo (abbreviated as IAR), short titled as: Aeroplani Romeo, a name which had been in common usage for some time.

All OFM aircraft types from 1925 have been mistakenly referred as produced by IMAM which was the successor of OFM. The aircraft produced in Naples by OFM from 1925 onwards frequently carried the inscription Aeroplani Romeo painted somewhere on the airframe. All the aircraft built by the company were popularly known as both OFMs and Romeos, but all were given the designation prefix Ro. For example, Ro.37 had a data plate riveted on cockpit's instrument panel with Aeroplani Romeo - SA Industrie Aeronautiche Romeo brand name on it.

In 1935, OFM (the railway workshop) was sold to Società Italiana Ernesto Breda. Later, between 1935-1936, Romeo also sold Societa Anonima Industrie Aeronautiche Romeo to Società Italiana Ernesto Breda, which combined the two companies into a single subsidiary organisation on October 1, 1936, the well known Industrie Meccaniche e Aeronautiche Meridionali (Southern Mechanical and Aviation Industries), often shortened to Meridionali or IMAM.

== Products ==
=== Aircraft ===
OFM Ro.1
Fokker C.V under licence, first flown March 1927, 1x420hp Alfa Romeo Jupiter IV engine.
OFM Ro.1 Ridotto
(late 1927) fighter version of the OFM Ro.1 with reduced wingspan (12.5m). 1 prototype built.
OFM Ro.1bis
550 hp Piaggio Jupiter VIII, 4-bladed propeller, 1x550hp Piaggio Jupiter VIII, 132 built.
OFM Ro.5
(1929) open cockpit
OFM Ro.5bis
(1929) full canopy cockpit
OFM Ro.6
(1929) a version of the Ro.5 with 85 hp Fiat engine.
OFM Ro.10
(1929) Fokker F.VII under licence, 3x215hp Alfa Romeo Lynx engines. 3 built for operation by Avio Linee Italiane and Ala Littoria.
OFM Ro.25
(1930) trainer built in single and two-seat versions. It was the 1st complete Giovanni Galasso's design for OFM. 2 prototypes built. One as landplane and one as seaplane.
OFM Ro.26
(1931) two-seat aerobatic biplane trainer built in small numbers both as a landplane and seaplane.
OFM Ro.30
(1932) three-seat reconnaissance biplane, 1x530hp Alfa Romeo Mercurius or 1xPiaggio 126-RC35 Jupiter. A few were built.
OFM Ro.35
(1933) single-seat glider, wingspan 14.5m. Only 1 produced and registered as I-ABBB.
OFM Ro.37
(1933) two-seat biplane light bomber and reconnaissance aircraft, 1x600hp Fiat A.30 V-12, 294 built.
OFM Ro.37bis
(1933) two-seat biplane light bomber and reconnaissance aircraft, 1x610hp Piaggio P.IX RC.40, 325 built.
OFM Ro.41
(1934) open cockpit biplane fighter, Originally designed and produced by OFM, taken over by Societa Anonima Industrie Aeronautiche Romeo and lately continued under IMAM.

=== Trams ===
- Several models of tramcars, including 246 trams for the Naples tram system between 1912 and 1935

== See also ==
- List of Italian companies
