= FS Class 746 =

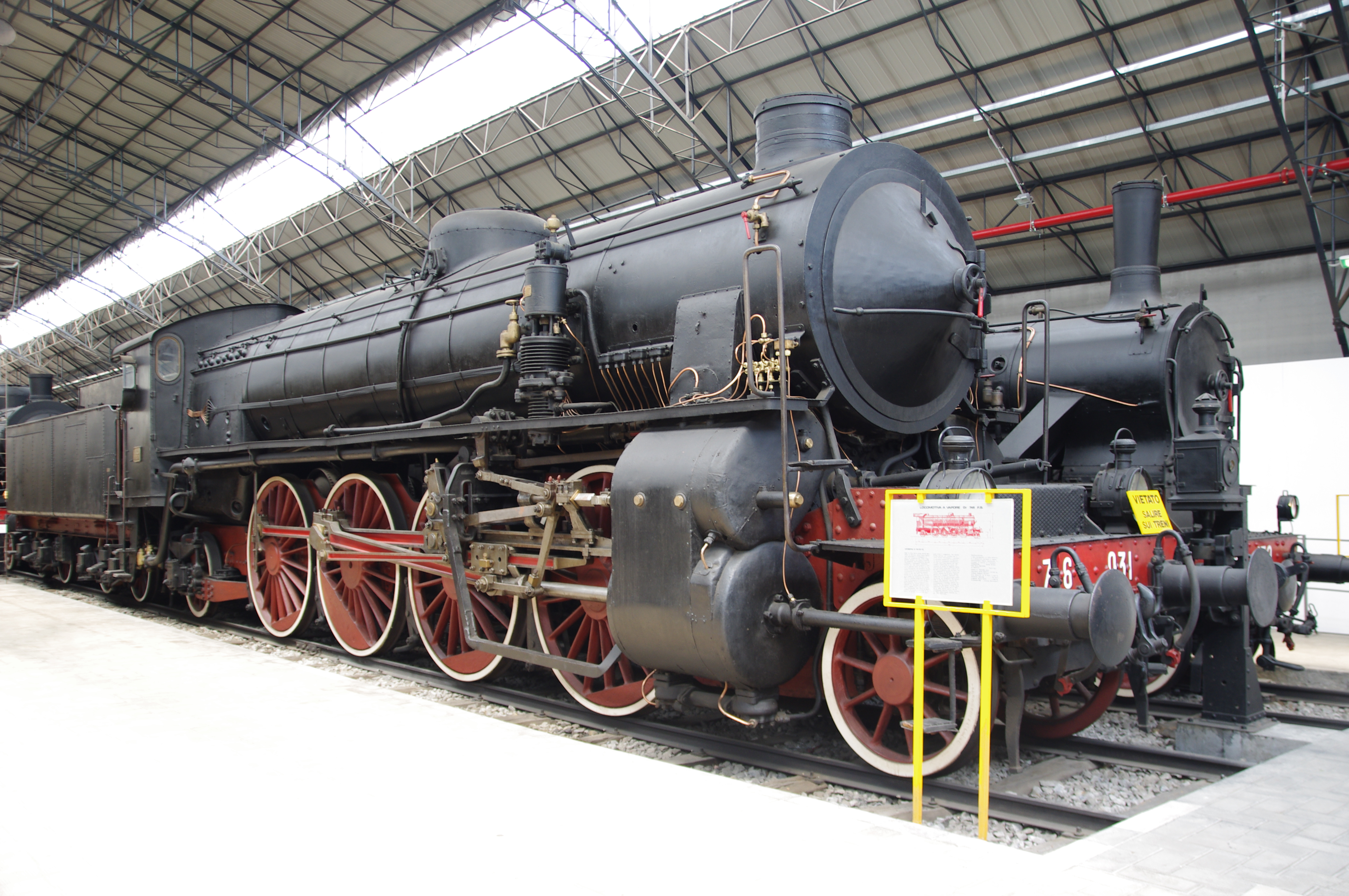
- FS locomotive 746.031 as preserved
Type and origin
- Power type: Steam
- Builder: Ernesto Breda (50), Gio. Ansaldo & C. (10)
- Build date: 1923–1927
- Total produced: 60
Specifications
- Configuration
  - Whyte: 2-8-2
  - UIC: 1′D1′ h4v
- Gauge: 1,435 mm (4 ft 8 1/2 in) standard gauge
- Leading dia.: 1,110 mm (43.70 in)
- Driver dia.: 1,880 mm (74.02 in)
- Trailing dia.: 1,125 mm (44.29 in)
- Length: 14,085 mm (46 ft 2 1/2 in)
- Axle load: 16.2 tonnes (15.9 long tons; 17.9 short tons)
- Loco weight: 98.8 tonnes (97.2 long tons; 108.9 short tons)
- Tender weight: 49.6 tonnes (48.8 long tons; 54.7 short tons)
- Total weight: 149 tonnes
- Fuel type: Coal
- Fuel capacity: 6,000 kg (13,000 lb)
- Water cap.: 22,000 litres (4,800 imp gal; 5,800 US gal)
- Firebox
  - Grate area: 4.3 m^{2} (46 sq ft)
- Boiler pressure: 16 kg/cm^{2} (1.57 MPa; 228 psi)
- Heating surface: 237 m^{2} (2,550 sq ft)
- Superheater
  - Heating area: 112 m^{2} (1,210 sq ft)
- Cylinders: Four, compound
- High-pressure cylinder: 490 mm × 680 mm (19.29 in × 26.77 in)
- Low-pressure cylinder: 720 mm × 680 mm (28.35 in × 26.77 in)
- Valve gear: Walschaerts, Caprotti
Performance figures
- Maximum speed: 100 km/h (62 mph)
- Power output: 1,750 CV (1,290 kW; 1,730 hp) at 75 km/h (47 mph)
- Tractive effort: 14,000 kgf (137 kN; 30,900 lbf)
Career
- Operators: Ferrovie dello Stato
- Numbers: 746.001 – 746.050; 747.001 – 747.010 → 746.101 – 746.110
- Disposition: Two preserved, remainder scrapped

The Ferrovie dello Stato Italiane (FS; Italian State Railways) Class 746 (Italian: Gruppo 746) is a class of 2-8-2 'Mikado' steam locomotive. These were the biggest steam locomotives ever built by the Ferrovie dello Stato, even though not the fastest, which were the Class 691s.

== Design and construction ==
The Class 746 originated from the need of a fast locomotive that, while having similar performance to the 'Pacific' Class 690, could have a lower axle load and therefore wider route availability; this could be achieved by adding another driving axle, and accepting a lower top speed (reverting to a leading Italian bogie). To achieve high performance, it was decided to adopt a symmetric compound engine (a Von Borries design), with the two inside high pressure (HP) cylinders having the motion for their valves derived from the outside Walschaerts valve gear; this was unusual for Italian locomotive practice, where the compound engine had been shelved once the superheating technology had become available in the 1910s.

Forty locomotives were ordered to the Ernesto Breda, which produced them in 1922, and then ten more in 1926; Gio. Ansaldo & C. built ten more, fitted with Caprotti valve gear, in the same years. The latter were initially classified as Class 747, but in 1930 they were reclassified as the 746.100-110 subclass.

== Operations and modifications ==
The Class 746 initially operated on the Milan-Bologna-Florence-Rome-Naples main line; after portions of it were electrified, they served on the Milan-Turin and the Milan-Brescia railways. In the 1960s, they were operating in Sicily and on the Adriatic coast railway (based at Ancona shed), until their withdrawals, which were concluded by 1967. While fast, powerful and suitable for both fast passenger and goods trains, the Class 746 proved difficult to start and somewhat uneasy when running at or close to its top speed (with both problems originating from its compound engine); also, at higher speeds the low-pressure cylinders contributed relatively little to the locomotive's power output. The locomotives fitted with Caprotti valve gear also turned out to have problems when functioning in reverse. Their poor riding qualities and their huge mass (for Italian standards) led some Milanese crews to nickname them "Krassin" (Note: The Krassin was a Russian icebreaker famous in Italy for having saved the survivors of the Polar expedition of Umberto Nobile; the implication was that the Class 746 locomotives likewise tended to 'break' the rails.).

In 1930, all the locomotives were modified with improved draughting. In 1932, four locomotives, two with Walschaerts valve gear (the 746.007 and the 046) and two with Caprotti valve gear (the 746.107 and the 108), were modified with a simple-expansion engine; while results were very encouraging, with the modified locomotives being as performant as the unmodified ones but performing better at higher speeds, the widespread electrification meant that this experiment was not followed up with more conversions.

=== Accidents and incidents ===
- On the 25th of February, 1956, No. 746.038 collided with a landslide on the coast between the stations of Ortona and Tollo Canosa while pulling an evening express. While the coaches all stayed on the rails, the engine & tender derailed, & ended up sinking a meter into the sand, & the front of the engine dipped in the sea. To recover the locomotive (a task that took 31 days) a temporary barrier between the engine and the sea was erected, after which the engine was dug out of the sand, jacked up and had temporary rails put under it. The main service line was then temporary disconnected, and connected to the temporary rails under the 038. After that, two 735 class engines dragged 038 back onto the line. Afterwards, the service line was reconnected.

== Preservation ==
Two Class 746 locomotives survive into preservation: FS 746.031, a static exhibit in the Museo della Scienza e della Tecnologia "Leonardo da Vinci" in Milano, and FS 746.038 which famously was hit by a landslide and dived into the Adriatic Sea, near Ortona in 1956, long preserved in the FS workshop of Verona and recently moved to Pistoia, to await a possible restoration.
