= FS Class E.470 =

Class E.470
Type and origin
- Power type: electric
- Builder: TIBB
- Build date: 1925-1926
- Total produced: 4
Specifications
- Configuration
  - AAR: 1-D-1
  - UIC: 1′D1′
- Gauge: 1,435 mm (4 ft 8 1/2 in) standard gauge
- Driver dia.: 1,630 mm (64 in)
- Adhesive weight: 64 tonnes (63 long tons; 71 short tons)
- Loco weight: 91 tonnes (90 long tons; 100 short tons)
- Electric system/s: Three-phase overhead line 10 kV, 45 Hz
- Current pickup: Two dual-collector pantographs
Performance figures
- Maximum speed: 100 km/h (62 mph)
- Power output: 2,090 kW (2,800 hp)
Career
- Operators: FS
- Disposition: All scrapped

The FS Class E.470 was an electric locomotive class of the state-owned Italian railway Ferrovie dello Stato. It was used on the Italian three-phase test line from Rome-Sulmona especially in express train service. After the end of the trial operation in 1945, the locomotives were scrapped, and no locomotive of the class has been preserved.

== Background ==
The operating experience with the northern Italian three-phase network running at 3.6 kV, 16.7 Hz threw up several problems. With increasing power demands, the voltage was too low and the direct drive to the axles risked overloading the traction motors.

Therefore, it was decided to try a trial route, which would be electrified with a 10 kV, 45 Hz three-phase power system. This had the advantage that power plants could be used with industrial frequency. It would be a test track with steep gradients and small radius curves. The Rome - Sulmona route was selected for the test.

The Class E.470 differed from earlier three-phase locomotives in two respects. The traction motors were supplied through a transformer and they drove through reduction gears to two dummy shafts, which were coupled to the driving wheels with the usual side rod drive.

For the experiment, the following locomotives were provided:

- Four express locomotives FS Class E.470 as described here
- Seventeen passenger locomotives FS Class E.472
- Four freight locomotives FS Class E.570

In addition, there was a locomotive, FS Class E.471, with a rotary converter.

== History of the locomotives ==
The Class E.470 locomotives were built by Tecnomasio Italiano Brown Boveri (TIBB) at Vado Ligure and bore a strong resemblance to FS Class E.431, including the use of pole pantographs. However, they could be distinguished from the E.431 by the presence of the oil cooler for the transformer and the dummy shafts on the drive triangle. After construction, the locomotives were tested on a section of the Modane - Turin railway line.

The locomotives were assigned from 1925 to 1928 the depot at Bussoleno. After 1928 they were transferred to the depot at Rome (San Lorenzo) to operate on the line from Rome to Sulmona. After 1935, they were relocated to the depot at Sulmona.

Overall, the operation with 10 kV, 45 Hz, three-phase did not bring particularly positive results. Fewer substations were required but there were more difficulties in the operation of the double overhead contact line, so that maintenance costs were high. For the latter reason, the line was rebuilt in 1945, after heavy damage in World War II, with 3 kV direct current (DC).

E.470.001 was scrapped in July 1947 at Turin. In December 1947, E.470.002 was scrapped and the other two machines disappeared in the same year. Among the negative results of the test operation was the out-dated equipment of locomotives with rod drive. The electric locomotives with DC drive had a better control and fewer operational difficulties.

For this reason, the experimental three-phase operation on the Rome - Sulmona line was not seen as a success.

== Construction ==
=== Mechanical ===
The Class E.470 had a 1ʹD1ʹ wheel arrangement. The outermost of the four driven axles were connected to Zara bogies. The drive and mechanical equipment was derived from the FS E.431. As there were sometimes difficulties in this class with overloading of the drive motors, those of the E.470 were put higher and worked via a gear transmission on a jackshaft. This resulted in a more flexible connection and fewer starting difficulties of the engines. From the jackshaft, the force was transmitted to the axles via a triangle and coupling rods, as with the FS E.431.

Originally, the four locomotives were equipped with rod pantographs. These were later replaced with pantographs analogous to those of Class FS E.432, probably to suit the higher voltage. In this case, a tubular construction was erected on two stems to support the current collector, a construction designed to achieve greater distance for bridging dead parts of the overhead lines.

=== Electrical ===
Like Class FS E.431, the E.470 also had four-speed electrical equipment. The current, taken from the overhead line and stepped down by the transformer with the optimum power factor, was transferred to the traction motors for propulsion. The four fixed speeds were obtained by switching between 6 or 8 poles on the motors and by parallel or cascade connection. Intermediate speeds were achieved by using a liquid rheostat, which allowed uniform acceleration when starting and when changing connections. The mode of action was analogous to the three-phase locomotives for 3.6 kV, 16.7 Hz. The main transformer was oil cooled. It supplied 1,000 V to the traction motors and had an additional winding at 110 V for auxiliaries.
