= FS Class E.471 =

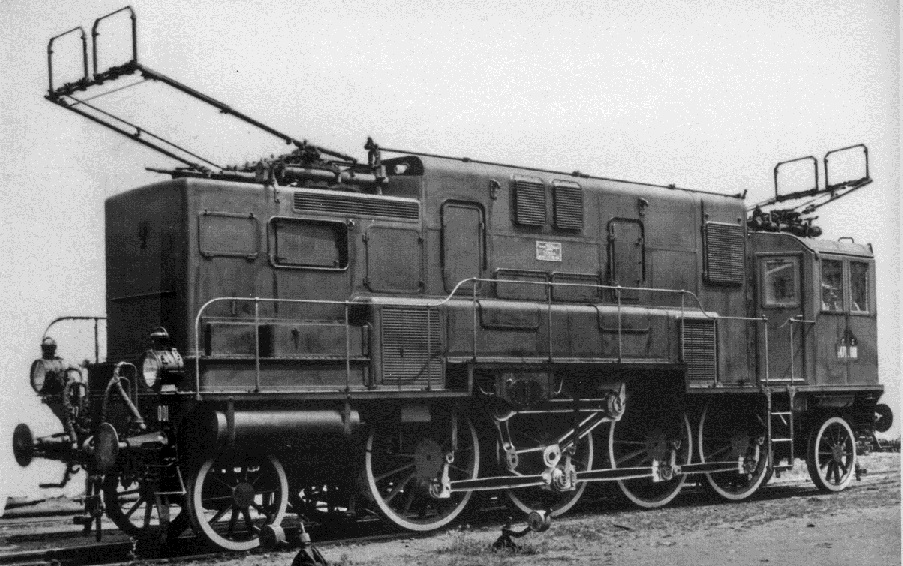
Type and origin
- Power type: Electric
- Builder: CEMSA
- Build date: 1928
- Total produced: 1
Specifications
- Configuration
  - AAR: 1-D-1
  - UIC: 1′D1′
- Gauge: 1,435 mm (4 ft 8 1/2 in) standard gauge
- Wheel diameter: 1,630 mm (64.17 in)
- Length: 13.5 m (44 ft 3 1/2 in)
- Adhesive weight: 58 tonnes (57 long tons; 64 short tons)
- Loco weight: 92 tonnes (91 long tons; 101 short tons)
- Electric system/s: AC, 3.6 kV, 16.7 Hz or 10 kV, 45 Hz
- Current pickup: overhead line
- Traction motors: 2
Performance figures
- Maximum speed: 75 km/h (47 mph) (16.7 Hz); 100 km/h (62 mph) (45 Hz)
- Power output: 1,630 kW (2,190 hp) (16.7 Hz); 3,270 kW (4,390 hp) (45 Hz)
Career
- Operators: FS

The FS Class E.471 locomotives were prototype three-phase AC electric locomotives designed for the Italian State Railways (FS). They constituted the first Italian experiment in using a phase converter. The final goal was to power them with single-phase alternating current, constituting the first case of a European locomotive of this type designed according to modern criteria. However, the difficulty of the development, and political interference, led to the abandonment of the project.

== History ==
In 1928, following the experience acquired in the three-phase high-voltage (10 kV) AC operation with FS Class E.470, a new locomotive of 3,270 kilowatts (4,390 hp) was built, which was supposed to represent the ultimate development of three-phase traction. It was called E.471, and it had the same 1′D1′ wheel arrangement as E.470, but it was technically different. Designed by the famous engineer Kálmán Kandó and built in the plant of Construzioni Elettro Meccaniche di Saronno (CEMSA), it was aimed at the future development of three-phase traction. According to the research of the engineer Erminio Mascherpa the project was not developed by the FS but autonomously by CEMSA thanks to the collaboration it had established with Kandó.

According to some oral testimonies, after management changes at the Material and Traction Service of FS due to the advent of Fascism in Italy, the project was judged "an error of the engineer Donati" and the test results were held to be unsatisfactory. Ten locomotives had been ordered but the project was terminated early and only one was actually built. On the other hand, Mascherpa provided an impressive documentation from which it seems that, at the end of the test runs, a tractive effort corresponding to that envisaged was achieved. Rather, the real reason for the termination was the hostility of the new FS leadership to the engineer Alfredo Donati (former director of the Special Electrification Unit of the General Directorate of FS) who was deported following the appointment of the extraordinary commissioner Edoardo Torre.

The success of direct current experiments, favoured by the new railway management, meant that the E.471 remained at the prototype stage and never entered regular service.

== Technical details ==
These were rotary converter locomotives and the long-term aim was to run them from a single-phase supply. For the tests, they were run from a three-phase supply at either 3.6 kV, 16.7 Hz or 10 kV 45 Hz.

Current collection was made by a pair of twin-collector bow collectors. Mechanical drive from the two frame-mounted traction motors to the wheels was by means of a Kandó triangle drive and coupling rods.
