= FS Class 691 =

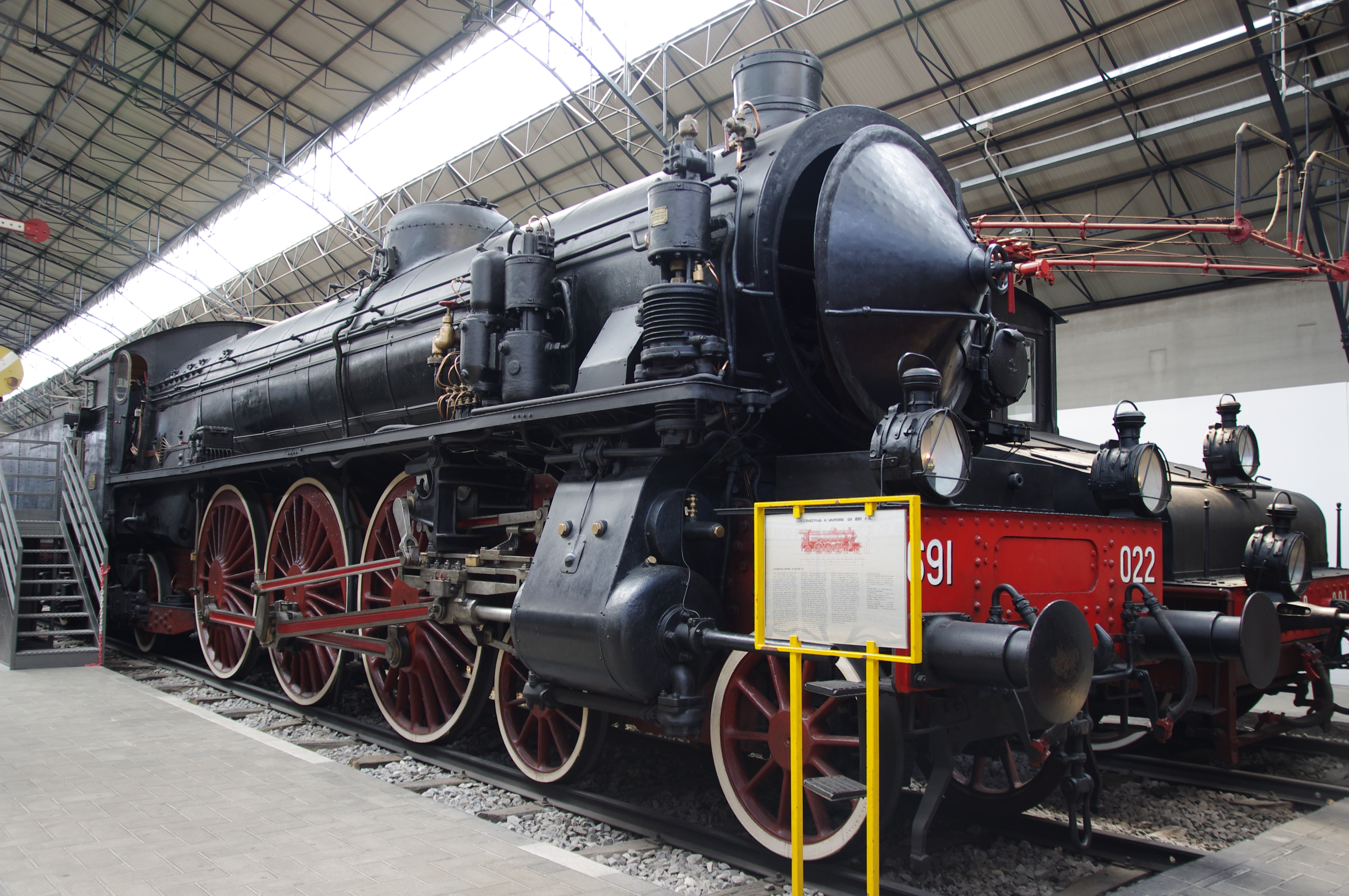
- FS locomotive 691.022 as preserved at the Museo nazionale della Scienza e della Tecnologia "Leonardo da Vinci", Milan
Type and origin
- Power type: Steam
- Rebuilder: FS workshops, Ernesto Breda
- Rebuild date: 1928–1934
- Number rebuilt: 33 rebuilt (from Class 690)
Specifications
- Configuration
  - UIC: 2′C1′ h4
- Gauge: 1,435 mm (4 ft 8 1/2 in) standard gauge
- Leading dia.: 1,090 mm (3 ft 6 7/8 in)
- Driver dia.: 2,030 mm (6 ft 7 7/8 in)
- Trailing dia.: 1,230 mm (4 ft 3/8 in)
- Length: 13,880 mm (45 ft 6 1/2 in)
- Axle load: 20 tonnes (20 long tons; 22 short tons)
- Loco weight: 96 tonnes (94 long tons; 106 short tons)
- Tender weight: 56 tonnes (55 long tons; 62 short tons)
- Total weight: 152 tonnes (150 long tons; 168 short tons)
- Fuel type: Coal
- Fuel capacity: 5,500 kg (12,100 lb)
- Water cap.: 29 m^{3} (6,380 imp gal; 7,660 US gal)
- Firebox
  - Grate area: 4.3 m^{2} (46 sq ft)
- Boiler pressure: 16 kg/cm^{2} (15.7 bar; 228 psi)
- Heating surface: 237 m^{2} (2,550 sq ft)
- Superheater
  - Heating area: 112 m^{2} (1,210 sq ft)
- Cylinders: Four, simple
- Cylinder size: 450 mm × 680 mm (17 11/16 in × 26 3/4 in)
- Valve gear: Walschaerts
Performance figures
- Maximum speed: 130 km/h (81 mph)
- Power output: 1,750 CV (1,290 kW; 1,730 hp)
- Tractive effort: 14,500 kgf (142 kN; 32,000 lbf)
Career
- Operators: Ferrovie dello Stato
- Numbers: 691.001 – 691.033
- Withdrawn: Early 1960s
- Preserved: One: 691.022

The Ferrovie dello Stato Italiane (FS; Italian State Railways) Class 691 (Italian: Gruppo 691) is a class of 4-6-2 'Pacific' locomotives; they were the fastest and most powerful steam locomotives ever built for the Italian railways.

== Origin ==
By the end of the 1920s the FS were considering the possibility of building a new class of Pacific locomotives for mainline express duties; the existing Class 690 ones were poor steamers (because of the small firebox) and therefore not being successful (with the much lighter Class S.685 2-6-2 locomotives having the same performance as them). This class, which should have been the Class 695, would have had however a very high axle load (as much as 21 tonnes (21 long tons; 23 short tons)), which would have required strengthening of the lines they were supposed to serve; as electrification was becoming more and more prominent, such an expense was considered unwarranted. Therefore, a less ambitious plan, which involved rebuilding the Class 690 locomotives (and which would have entailed a lower axle load), was approved.

The boiler of the Class 690 was replaced by the one fitted on the Class 746 locomotives; the trailing axle was replaced by a Bissel truck, to sustain the weight of the new, larger firebox, and a Nielebock-Knorr pre-heater was added. The 33 locomotives were rebuilt, part by the FS workshops, and part by the Ernesto Breda company. Initially, they would have received the same tender designed for the Class 695, but in the end an enlarged version of the standard FS bogie tender was fitted.

== Operation ==
The Class 691 served on the Milan-Bologna (up to 1938, when the line was electrified) and the Milan-Venice mainlines throughout their careers, pulling the heaviest and fastest express trains. Three of them were destroyed or irreparably damaged in the years of World War II. After the electrification of the Milan-Venice railway in the spring of 1957, some locomotives remained active for some time on the Venice-Cervignano del Friuli line, but by the early 1960s they were all withdrawn.

The 691.011 scored the speed record, between the stations of Verona and Padova, for the Italian steam locomotives, with 150 kilometres per hour (93 mph).

== Modifications ==
In 1939, the 691.026 was given a streamlined casing, which was unsuccessful; by 1946 the casing had already been removed.

In 1943, the 691.004 was fitted with a smoke deflector with bad results.

== Preservation ==
Only one locomotive of the class survived into preservation, the 691.022, which is a static exhibit at the Museo della Scienza e della Tecnologia "Leonardo da Vinci" in Milan.
