= Nicola Romeo =

Italian engineer and entrepreneur (1876–1938)

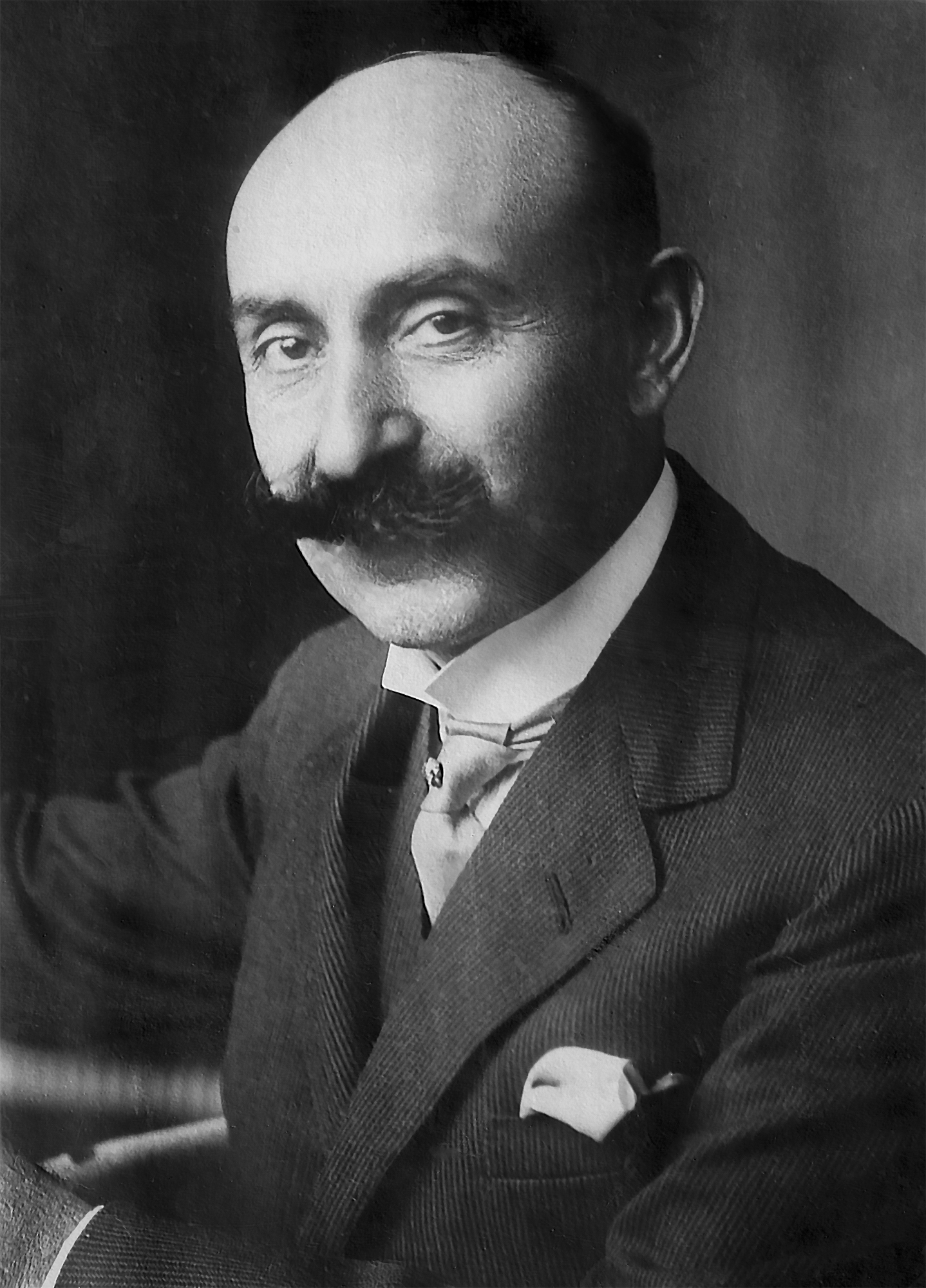
- Born: 28 April 1876; Sant'Antimo, Kingdom of Italy
- Died: 15 August 1938 (aged 62); Magreglio, Kingdom of Italy
- Engineering career
- Projects: Alfa Romeo

Nicola Romeo (/ˈroʊmioʊ/; Italian: [niˈkɔːla roˈmɛːo]; 28 April 1876 – 15 August 1938) was an Italian engineer and entrepreneur mostly known for founding the car manufacturer Alfa Romeo. He served as a senator in the 18th Legislature of the Kingdom of Italy.

== Career ==
Romeo graduated with a degree in engineering from the Politecnico di Napoli (nowadays Università degli Studi di Napoli Federico II) in 1899. After that, he worked for a couple of years abroad and completed a second bachelor's degree in electrical engineering in Liège, Belgium. In 1911, he returned to Italy and created "Ing. Nicola Romeo e Co.". The company manufactured machines and equipment for the mining industry. As the company became successful, he wished to expand and acquired a majority of the Milan-based car manufacturing company A.L.F.A. (Anonima Lombarda Fabbrica Automobili) in 1915. Only three years later, in 1918, Romeo owned the whole company. A.L.F.A. was renamed to "Anonima Lombarda Fabbrica Automobili Romeo". The first car carrying the Alfa Romeo badge was the 1921 Torpedo 20/30 HP. The company gained a good reputation for building elegant and safe cars as well as aircraft parts, but in 1927 it came very close to liquidation due to a series of bad investments. During a tense board meeting, Romeo was asked to leave the company, although the new CEO Pasquale Gallo persuaded him to stay as president. Romeo officially departed from Alfa Romeo in 1928.

== Engineering companies ==
Nicola Romeo owned a number of engineering companies, not all at the same time. These included:

- Ing. Nicola Romeo e Co.
- Società Nicola Romeo di Saronno
- Costruzioni Meccaniche di Saronno
- CEMSA
- Officine Ferroviarie Meridionali - OFM
- Industrie Meccaniche e Aeronautiche Meridionali - IMAN

== Family ==
In 1905, he married Angelina Valadin, a Portuguese opera singer and pianist. Together they had seven children: Maurizio, Edoardo, Nicholas, Elena, Giulietta, Piera and Irene.

== Death ==
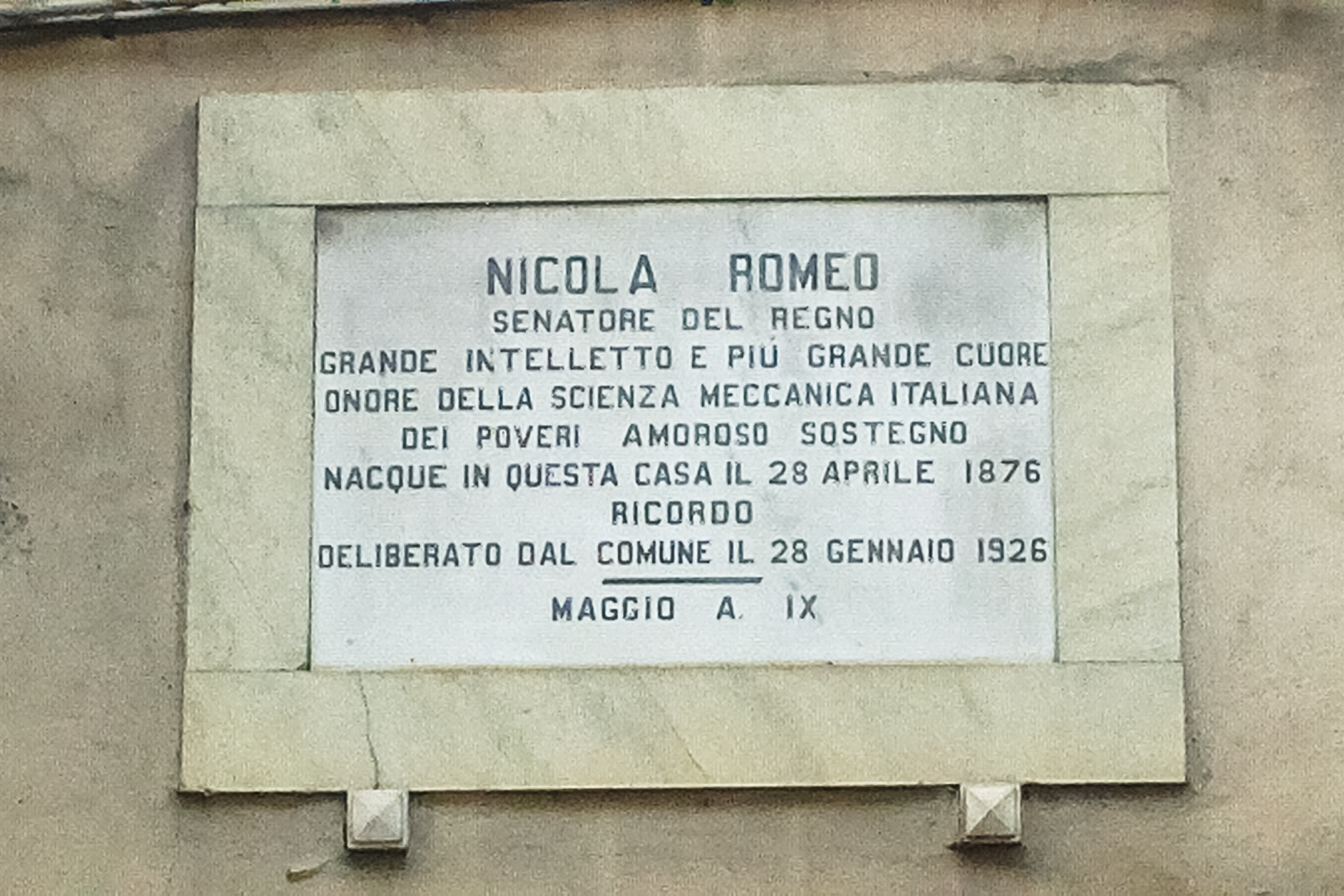
Nicola Romeo Script's Honourable Plate in his birth city, Sant'Antimo (Naples), Italy.

Nicola Romeo died on 15 August 1938 in his home at Lake Como at the age of 62. Almost seventy years after his death and on the occasion of the 130th anniversary of his birth, the city of Naples dedicated a street to his memory in Rione Lauro, called Via Nicola Romeo.
