= FS Class 690 II =

FS Class 690
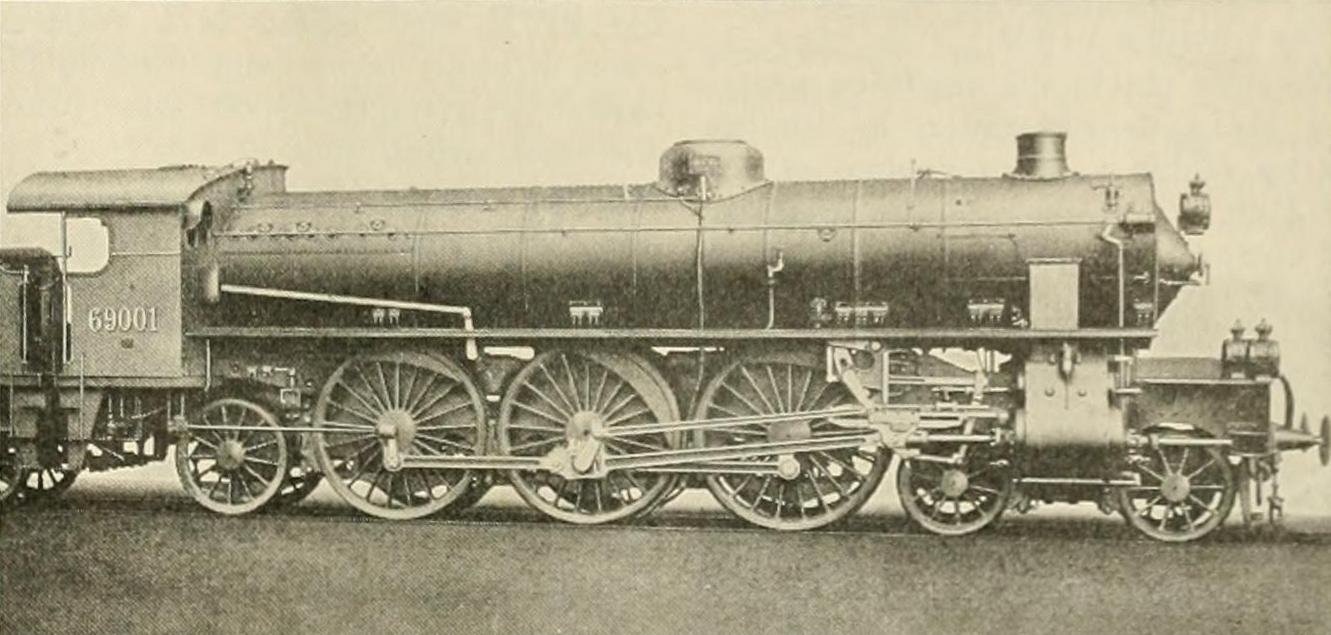
- FS locomotive 69001 (later 690.001)
Type and origin
- Power type: Steam
- Builder: Ernesto Breda (20), Officine Meccaniche (3), Gio. Ansaldo & C. (10)
- Build date: 1911–1914
- Total produced: 33
Specifications
- Configuration
  - UIC: 2′C1′ h4
- Gauge: 1,435 mm (4 ft 8 1/2 in) standard gauge
- Leading dia.: 1,090 mm (3 ft 6 7/8 in)
- Driver dia.: 2,030 mm (6 ft 7 7/8 in)
- Trailing dia.: 1,360 mm (4 ft 5 1/2 in)
- Length: 13,430 mm (44 ft 3/4 in)
- Axle load: 17.1 tonnes (16.8 long tons; 18.8 short tons)
- Loco weight: 87.2 tonnes (85.8 long tons; 96.1 short tons)
- Tender weight: 49.6 tonnes (48.8 long tons; 54.7 short tons)
- Total weight: 136.8 tonnes (134.6 long tons; 150.8 short tons)
- Fuel type: Coal
- Fuel capacity: 6,000 kg (13,000 lb)
- Water cap.: 22 m^{3} (4,840 imp gal; 5,810 US gal)
- Firebox
  - Grate area: 3.5 m^{2} (38 sq ft)
- Boiler pressure: 12 kg/cm^{2} (11.8 bar; 171 psi)
- Heating surface: 210 m^{2} (2,300 sq ft)
- Superheater
  - Heating area: 67 m^{2} (720 sq ft)
- Cylinders: Four, simple
- Cylinder size: 450 mm × 680 mm (17 11/16 in × 26 3/4 in)
- Valve gear: Walschaerts
Performance figures
- Maximum speed: 130 km/h (81 mph)
- Power output: 1,400 CV (1,030 kW; 1,380 hp)
- Tractive effort: 12,400 kgf (122 kN; 27,300 lbf)
Career
- Operators: Ferrovie dello Stato
- Numbers: new: 69001–69033; from 1918: 690.001 – 690.033
- Disposition: All rebuilt to class 691 (1928–1934)

The Ferrovie dello Stato Italiane (FS; Italian State Railways) Class 690 (Italian: Gruppo 690) was a 4-6-2 'Pacific' steam locomotive for express trains.

== Design and construction ==
The Class 690 was designed just as the superheater technology was becoming available, allowing the FS to discard what had been a widespread feature on many Italian locomotives, the compound engine, deeming the advantages of the simpler single-expansion engine coupled with superheated steam to be superior.

The English author Peter Michael Kalla-Bishop said that, just before the production run, a prototype (numbered FS 6901) was built with a number of different features, but was so unsuccessful that it was withdrawn and quietly scrapped after just a few months. However, there is no reference for this, which is not repeated in any other document.

The first nine locomotives, all with right-hand drive, were built in 1911, six by Ernesto Breda and three by the Officine Meccaniche; the following twenty-four, fourteen of which were built in 1914 by Breda and ten by Gio. Ansaldo & C., had left-hand drive. They had all been designed for an axle load of 18 tons, but since this value was too high for even the current mainline railways, they all entered service with the load on the driving wheels lightened to 17.1 tons. They were the first Italian four-cylinder simple-expansion locomotives that had the adjacent cylinders paired together, each pair served by a single piston valve through crossed ports (a feature shared by the more numerous Class 685). The firebox had to be placed between the rearmost driving wheels, and was consequently trapezoidal and relatively small, causing poor steaming and high costs; this was a significant weakness of the locomotive.

== Operations ==
Limited by their high axle load to the Milan-Venice and Milan-Bologna-Florence mainlines, the Class 690 did not prove to be satisfactory, as its poor steaming qualities greatly hampered the performance. While fast (being the first Italian locomotive certified for a mainline top speed of 130 km/h (81 mph) and powerful in absolute terms, relatively speaking its performance was modest – 1400 CV at 90 km/h (1,030 kW; 1,380 hp at 56 mph), while the Class 685 (which was smaller and had a shorter boiler) had a power of 1250 CV at 75 km/h (920 kW; 1,230 hp at 47 mph).

As a result, by the end of the 1920s a new three-cylinder Pacific locomotive (to be classified as Class 695) was designed; however, although more powerful than the Class 690, it would have required considerable strengthening of bridges and other infrastructures of the railways it was supposed to work on, because of an axle load of 21 tons. Much of the Italian railway network had been or was being electrified, so this strengthening would not have been worth the expense. Therefore, a less ambitious plan to rebuild the Class 690 by replacing the boiler and firebox with those of the FS Class 746 was approved. From 1928 to 1934 all thirty-three locomotives were rebuilt into the new Class 691.
