= FS Class E.428 =

FS class E.428
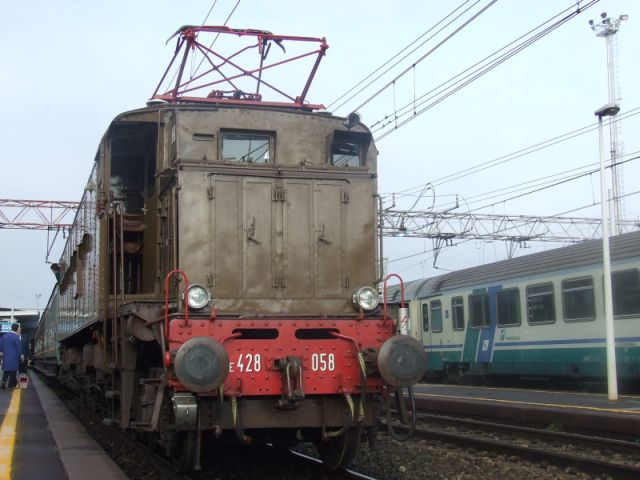
- First-series E.428.058 hauling an historical train
Type and origin
- Power type: Electric
- Builder: Breda, Ansaldo, Officine Reggiane and Fiat-Marelli
- Build date: 1934-1943
Specifications
- Configuration
  - AAR: 2-B-B-2
  - UIC: (2'Bo)(Bo2')
- Gauge: 1,435 mm (4 ft 8 1/2 in) standard gauge
- Wheel diameter: 1.880 m (74.02 in) (driving wheels)
- Wheelbase: 5.450 m (17 ft 10 5/8 in)
- Length: 19.000 m (62 ft 4 in)
- Loco weight: 130 t (130 long tons; 140 short tons)/135 t (133 long tons; 149 short tons)
- Electric system/s: 3,000 V DC Catenary
- Current pickup(s): Pantograph
- Traction motors: DC series
- Transmission: 29/103 and 31/101 gear ratios
Performance figures
- Maximum speed: 130 km/h (81 mph)
- Power output: 2,800 kW (3,800 hp)
- Tractive effort: 115 kN (26,000 lb_{f}) /137 kN (31,000 lb_{f})
Career
- Operators: FS Trenitalia
- Number in class: 242 in three series
- First run: 1934
- Disposition: Decommissioned in 1988

The FS E.428 was a class of Italian railways electric locomotives. They were introduced in the course of the 1930s, for fast services on the Florence–Rome railway, being decommissioned in the 1980s.

== History ==
When in the 1930s, in the course of the Fascist government's program of railways development, a new locomotive was needed to provide a fast service on the newly electrified Milan-Rome mainline at 3,000 V DC. This was also permitted by the introduction of new metallic passenger cars, capable of relative higher speeds. The requirement was shipped to the FS design team of Ing. Giuseppe Bianchi at Florence.

The new locomotive was impressive for the times: huge, heavy, powerful and fast. They were 4 metres (13 ft 1 1/2 in) longer than the E.626, the first Italian DC electric locomotives, and weighed 10–20 t (9.8–19.7 long tons; 11–22 short tons) more. The original requirement asked for the notable service speed of 150 km/h (93 mph), but this was later reduced to 130 km/h (81 mph).

The E.428 was to be built in conjunction with a lighter version, the E.326, but those proved unsuccessful and were limited to lower speeds.

The first wheel arrangement devised was a 2-Do-2, with four trailing axles at the fronts and a single motor driving four central axles. However, the experiences with the E.326 suggested to split the central bogie into two motorized ones. The first locomotive, E.428.001, was released in May 1934. A first series, for a total of 97 units, was produced until 1937. A second order in the same series requested a shorter gear ratio (29/103) and larger air intakes, which caused an increase in weight of four tons.

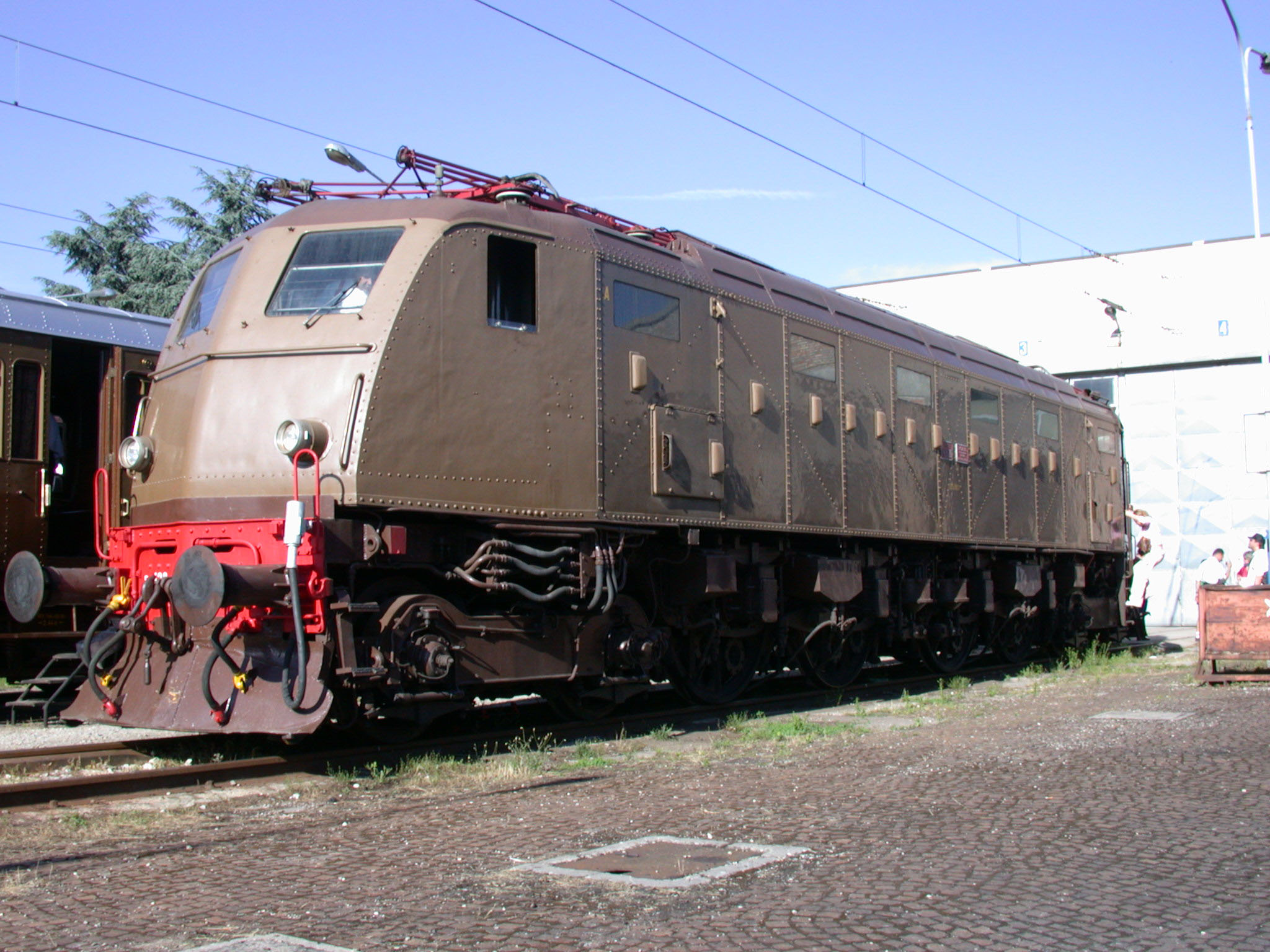
The "aerodynamic" profile of E.428.226, a third-series locomotive.

The second series (81 units) differed in the removal of the frontal bonnets, replaced by a more profiled driving cabin: this set a style which was adopted for all the following Italian locomotives. A third order was issued on April 5, 1939, for 80 locomotives, but the construction was halted by the outbreak of World War II after the completion of 39 units. Some of those locomotives, built by Ansaldo, were theoretically capable of speeds up to 150 km/h.

All the E.428s, aside from two, were repaired or rebuilt after World War II. Curiously, the bronze fascist lictorial crests on the front were removed only in 1946. In the 1960s, the "Fast sub-class", with the 34/98 gear ratio, was built back to the shorter 29/103.
