= Ferrovia Alta Valtellina =

Railway line in Italy

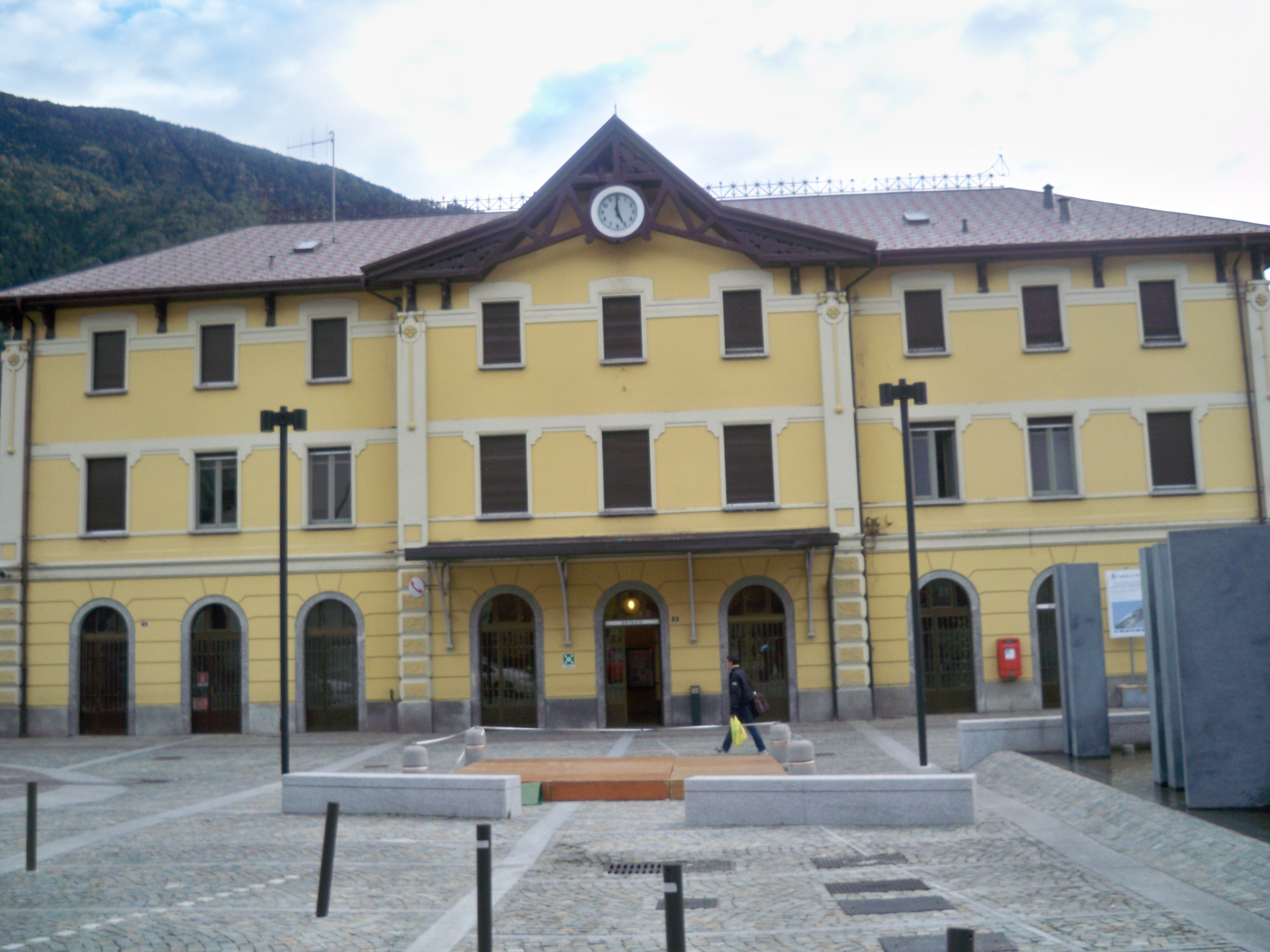
Ferrovia Alta Valtellina

The Ferrovia Alta Valtellina (FAV) is a railway line in Italy which connects Sondrio, in Valtellina, to Tirano in Alta Valtellina (Upper Tellina Valley). The railway company was established in 1899 and the line opened in 1902. Many railways in Italy were nationalized in 1905 but the Ferrovia Alta Valtellina escaped and was not nationalized until 1970.

== History ==
In 1899 a company was established for the Alta Valtellina Railway (FAV) with the aim of connecting Sondrio with Tirano. It obtained the concession in August of the same year and started construction work. The line, called the Alta Valtellina, was a natural continuation of the Valtellina Line (Sondrio-Lecco) and the service was inaugurated on 29 June 1902. Initially it was operated by steam traction using four Henschel steam locomotives. Numbers 1-3 were 0-4-0T and number 4 was a 0-6-0T of the Prussian T 3 type. Three more Prussian T 3s, numbers 5-7, arrived later. FAV No.6 is preserved.

On 1 July 1908, the Tirano-St.Moritz line was activated by the Swiss private company Berninabahn (now part of the Rhaetian Railway) which allowed the connection of the Upper Tellina Valley with the Swiss slopes of the region.

== Electrification ==
In 1932 the line was electrified using the same three-phase system as the Ferrovia della Valtellina. Four electric locomotives were used and they became FAV Class E.440. Numbers 1-3 were built by Costruzioni Elettro Meccaniche di Saronno (CEMSA). Number 4 was built by Tecnomasio Italiano Brown Boveri (TIBB).

In 1967, due to the declining popularity of three-phase traction, the line was de-electrified and operated by diesel-powered trains of type ALn 556 chartered from Ferrovie dello Stato Italiane (FS). In 1970, the line was nationalized and became part of the FS network. On 29 May 1980, electric traction was re-introduced using the 3 kV direct current system. From 1981 the first direct trains from Milan to Tirano were established.

== Upgrade programme ==
In the mid-1980s, the line was the subject of a larger programme to upgrade the route from Milan for a cost of about 100 billion lire, which involved the activation of Centralized Traffic Control (CTC) between Sondrio and Tirano, with a Central Manager in Colico. As part of this plan, in 1986 the stations of Chiuro, San Giacomo di Teglio, Bianzone and Villa di Tirano were downgraded to halts.

== Service reduction ==
Since 2008, train services have been progressively reduced from 19 to 13, and in June 2014 there was a further reduction. Currently, there are 9 daily services.
