= FS Class E.626 =

Italian electric locomotive

FS class E.625/E.626
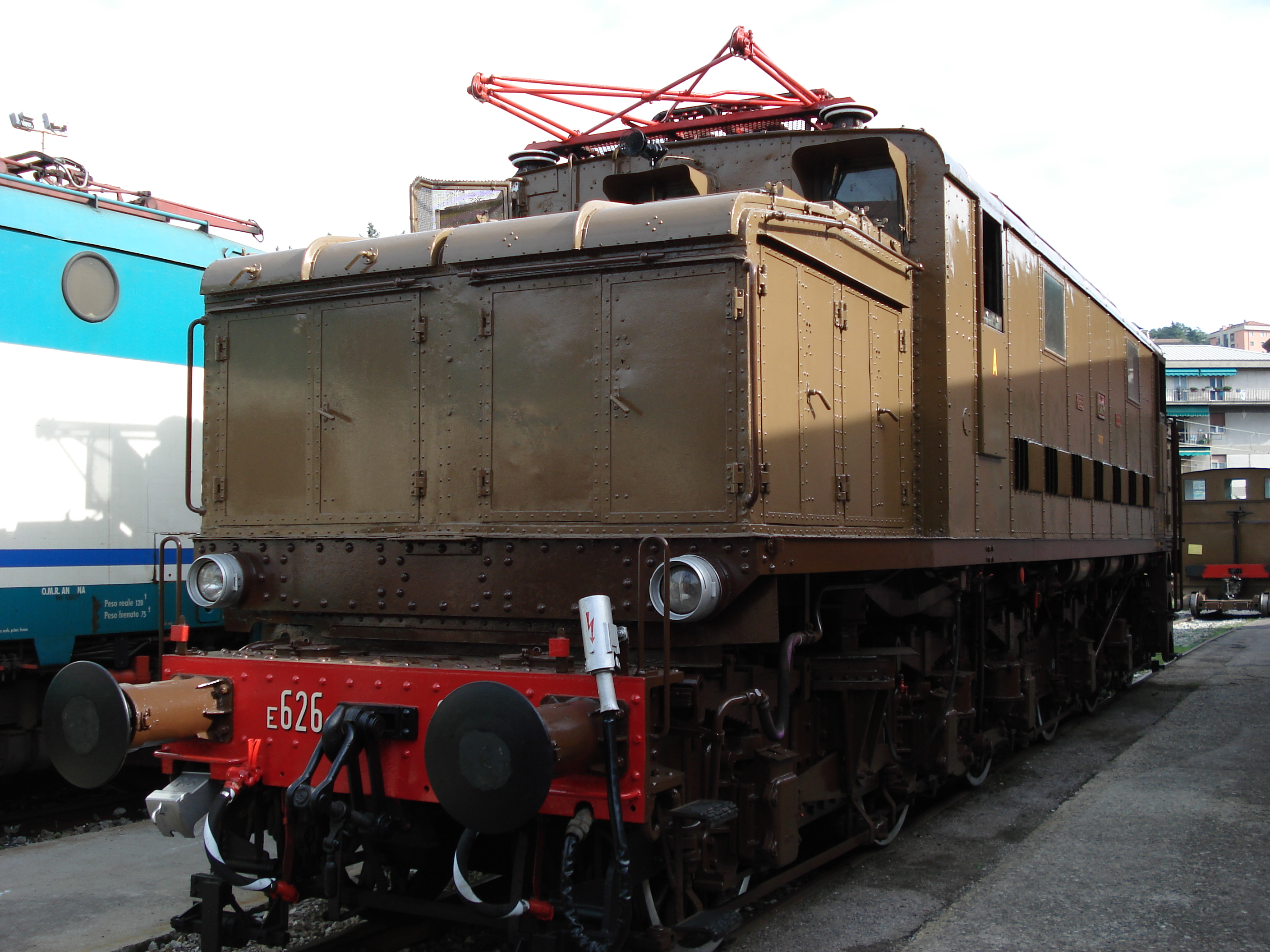
- An E.626 in the National Museum of Transportation at La Spezia
Type and origin
- Power type: Electric
- Builder: OM, TIBB, CEMSA, General Electric, Brown Boveri, SNO Savigliano, Westinghouse with electrical equipment from Metropolitan-Vickers
- Build date: 1927-1939
Specifications
- Configuration
  - UIC: Bo′BoBo′
- Gauge: 1,435 mm (4 ft 8 1/2 in) standard gauge
- Wheel diameter: 1.250 m (49.21 in)
- Length: 14.950 m (49 ft 5/8 in)
- Loco weight: 84.5 t (83.2 long tons; 93.1 short tons)/97 t (95 long tons; 107 short tons)
- Electric system/s: 3,000 V DC Catenary
- Current pickup: Pantograph
- Traction motors: DC series
- Transmission: 21/76 (E.625) and 24/73 (E.626) gear ratios
Performance figures
- Maximum speed: 50 km/h (31 mph) (E.625); 95 km/h (59 mph) (E.626)
- Power output: 1,850 kW (2,480 hp)
- Tractive effort: 105 kN (24,000 lb_{f})
Career
- Operators: FS Trenitalia, Jugoslovenske železnice, Československe statny drahy
- Number in class: 448 in three series (Note: Plus a prototype series)
- First run: 1928
- Disposition: Decommissioned

The FS E.625 and E.626 are two classes of Italian electric locomotives produced for the Ferrovie dello Stato. They were introduced in the course of the 1920s and remained in service until the 1990s. The E.626 was the first locomotive fed by 3,000 V DC overhead line in Italy.

== History ==
The E.626 class is the result of a requirement issued in 1926 by the Ferrovie dello Stato (FS, Italian Railways) for a new locomotive to be used under the new 3,000 V DC line being built between Foggia and Benevento. (Note: The previous electrified lines of Italy used 15 kV, 16.7 Hz AC. The 3,000 V is currently the standard system in service, apart some High Speed lines fed at 25 kV AC.) The design was carried out by the team of Giuseppe Bianchi, the "founder" of modern Italian railways, at the FS Traction and Material Service in Florence. The requirement specified the locomotive should have six traction axles, to improve adhesion on steep lines. The E.626 series totalled 448 units in three series, each with only slight electro-mechanical differences. It was old-fashioned, but reliable, and it became the mainstay of the new FS lines at 3,000 V DC, which gradually spread to the whole peninsula.

== Trials ==
The firsts tests occurred on the Foggia-Benevento line in the September 1927, using three prototypes built by Savigliano, with the electrical equipment provided by Metropolitan-Vickers of Manchester. The first 14 prototypes (eight E.625 with lower gear ratio, for freight services, and six E.626) proved powerful and reliable, and entered service the following year. The only teething problem encountered was with the six 32R motors mounted on the axles, hanging laterally over transverse beams, a system devised to avoid the complicated side rods of the contemporary steam and three-phase locomotives. After a series of breakdowns, it was decided to limit the speed to 95 km/h (59 mph). Traction control was provided by three different motor combinations (series, series-parallel, parallel) through banks of resistor-based rheostats. The transmission was rather noisy, but at the time, the crew's comfort was not a high priority. The carbody was in a single steel piece, mounted on an articulated chassis. The large bonnets at the ends limited the visibility of the rails, and they were reduced in size from the third series.

== Mass production ==
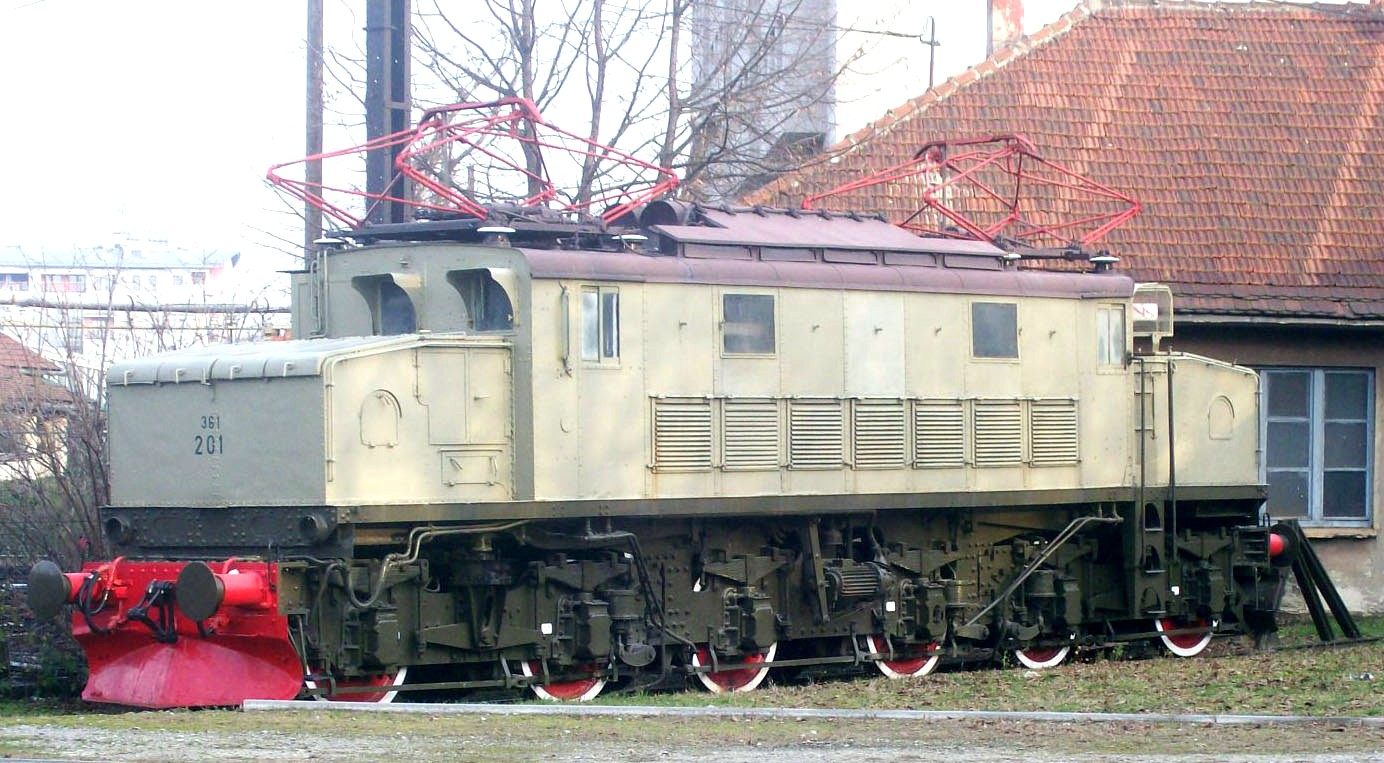
JŽ series E361

In 1930 the mass production was started, with a first series of 85 units. In the meantime the E.625 were re-converted to E.626. In 1934-1938 a record number of 308 units was built, while in 1939 the last series, with low gear ratio, was shipped (they were later standardized). The new E636 of the 1940s initially shared the motors and some of the electro-mechanical devices with the E.626.

After the destruction of World War II, in 1946 an updating and repair programme was launched. Some other units remained in the countries previously occupied by Italy. Seventeen locomotives were ceded to the Yugoslavian Railways (Class E626, from 1957 Class E61 and from 1962 finally classified as Class 361) and, in 1958, four were given to Czechoslovakia (Class E 666.0). Now inadequate for the passenger role, the E.626s were transferred to freight service, apart from working commuter trains in some areas of Italy.

In the 1970s, the E.626s fell out of favour, partly because of complaints from trade unions about poor working conditions for the crew. Fourteen units were sold to private railways and the remaining units were gradually replaced by more modern classes, and scrapped. The last unit to be decommissioned was E.626.194, which was used for rescue trains, in 1999.

== Preservation ==
18 units are preserved, 7 in museums and 11 refurbished engines are used for historical trains.
