= E464 =

E464 may refer to:

- FS Class E464, a class of Italian railways electric locomotives
- Hydroxypropyl methylcellulose, an emulsifier
