= Tecnomasio =

Italian scientific and precision equipment manufacturer

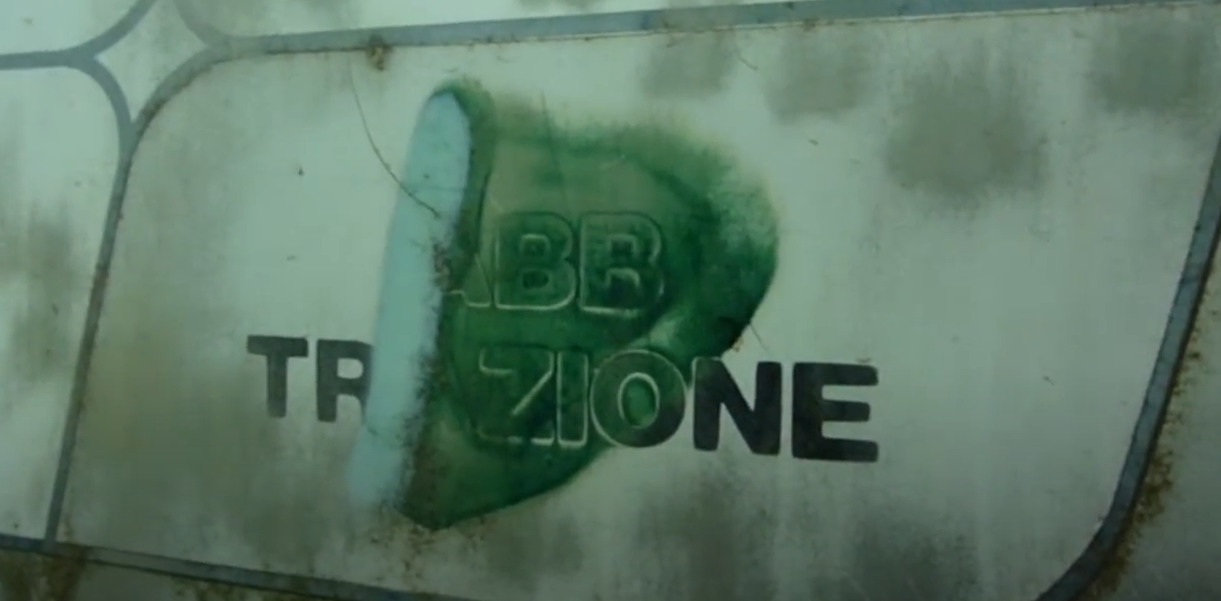
- Industry: formerly: Scientific instruments Electro-mechanical engineering latterly industrial electromechanical devices
- Founded: 1863
- Founder: Luigi Longoni, Carlo Dell'Acqua, Ignazio Porro
- Headquarters: Rome, Italy
- Key people: Bartolomeo Cabella, director (1871-1903)
- Products: formerly Scientific, and high precision instruments latterly Locomotives, alternators, transformers, electric arc furnaces

Tecnomasio was an Italian scientific and precision instrument company founded in the 1860s. By the beginning of the 20th century the company has begun to produce electrical equipment. After financial problems in the early 1900s the company was acquired by Brown Boveri becoming Tecnomasio Italiano Brown Boveri commonly known as TIBB; instrument production halted and the company became an industrial electrical equipment producer, one of the major companies in Italy.

The company became part of the ABB group as ABB Tecnomasio in 1988 after the merger of its parent. The plant in Vado Ligure became part of Adtranz and later part of Bombardier's transportation group.

== History ==
The origins of Tecnomasio go back as far as 1863 when mechanical and civil engineer Luigi Longoni, instrument maker Carlo Dell'Acqua, and optical scientist Ignazio Porro founded a company in Milan. Porro left the company in 1864 to be replaced by photographer Alessandro Duroni forming the company Duroni, Longoni, Dell'Acqua. Alessandro gave up his stake in 1866 and Dell'Acqua in 1868 making Longoni the sole owner. In 1870 Bartolomeo Cabella joined the company. Longoni died in 1871, and Cabella became the director of the company.

Initially the company produced scientific apparatus, including microscopes, heliostats, cathetometers, theodolites and arc lamps. Cabella took over the company in 1878 and the name became Ing. B. Cabella e C.

Under Cabella's management the company attempted to expand its product range from precision instrument to one including industrial electromechanical devices such as alternators and dynamos; the company was converted to a limited company in 1898 as Società Anonima Tecnomasio Italiano ing. B. Cabella e C. By 1903 the company was in a financial crisis, Cabella was dismissed from the company, and Brown Boveri of Switzerland took a 50% stake in the company, forming Tecnomasio Italiano Brown Boveri (TIBB). The company ended its production of instruments and became a manufacturer of industrial equipment.

The milanese electromechanical company Gadda e C. was also acquired by Brown and Boveri in 1908 and the Westinghouse factory in Vado Ligure was acquired in 1921. During the next two decades the factories in Milan played a major role in supplying electrical generators and transformers for Italian hydroelectric plant. The company also became involved in railway electrification, electrifying the line from Bolzano to Brenner founding the company Sae.

During World War II the factories were badly damaged by bombing, afterwards production of locomotives and large-scale electrical generators began again, along with the start of production of white goods.

In 1988 the company became part of the ABB Group after the merger of its parent Brown Boveri with ASEA, later it would become part of Adtranz, and after Adtranz became fully owned by DaimlerChrysler the name of Italian sub division became Daimler Chrysler Rail System (Italia) SpA.

As of 2010 the Vado Ligure plant is part of Bombardier Transportation Italy S.p.A. and manufactures locomotives.

== Products and projects ==
=== Locomotives ===
In 1911 TIBB supplied the FS Class E.320 electric locomotives for the Italian Railways, whilst the Westinghouse plant in Vado Ligure manufactured the FS Class E.550 between 1908 and 1920. After the state railways decided on 3 kV DC electrification prototypes of class FS Class E.625 were produced in Vado Ligure.

Post WWII the FS Class E.424 (1940s) and then FS Class E.636 (1950s) followed by the FS Class E.646 during the 1960s all of which were successful designs.

During the 1960s and 1970s the FS Class E.444 and FS Class E.656 were produced, by the 1980s electronic chopper control began to be used, first in the FS Class E.632. By the 1990s the company had taken part in the consortium producing the ETR 500 high speed trains.

From the 1990s, locomotive production switched to ABB-developed inverter-controlled AC induction motor technology, first introduced in the multivoltage electric locomotives of the FS Class E.412, already delivered as part of the Adtranz group. The FS Class E.464, a single-cabin electric locomotive manufactured at Vado Ligure from 1996 onwards would become one of the most numerous Italian locomotives ever with over 600 units ordered; production continued under Bombardier's ownership.

== See also ==
- List of Italian companies
- Lodi T.I.B.B. (Milan Metro), station in Milan named after TIBB
