= E636 =

E636 may refer to:

- Maltol, a flavour enhancer
- FS class E636, an Italian locomotives class
