= FS Class E.421 =

FS class E.421
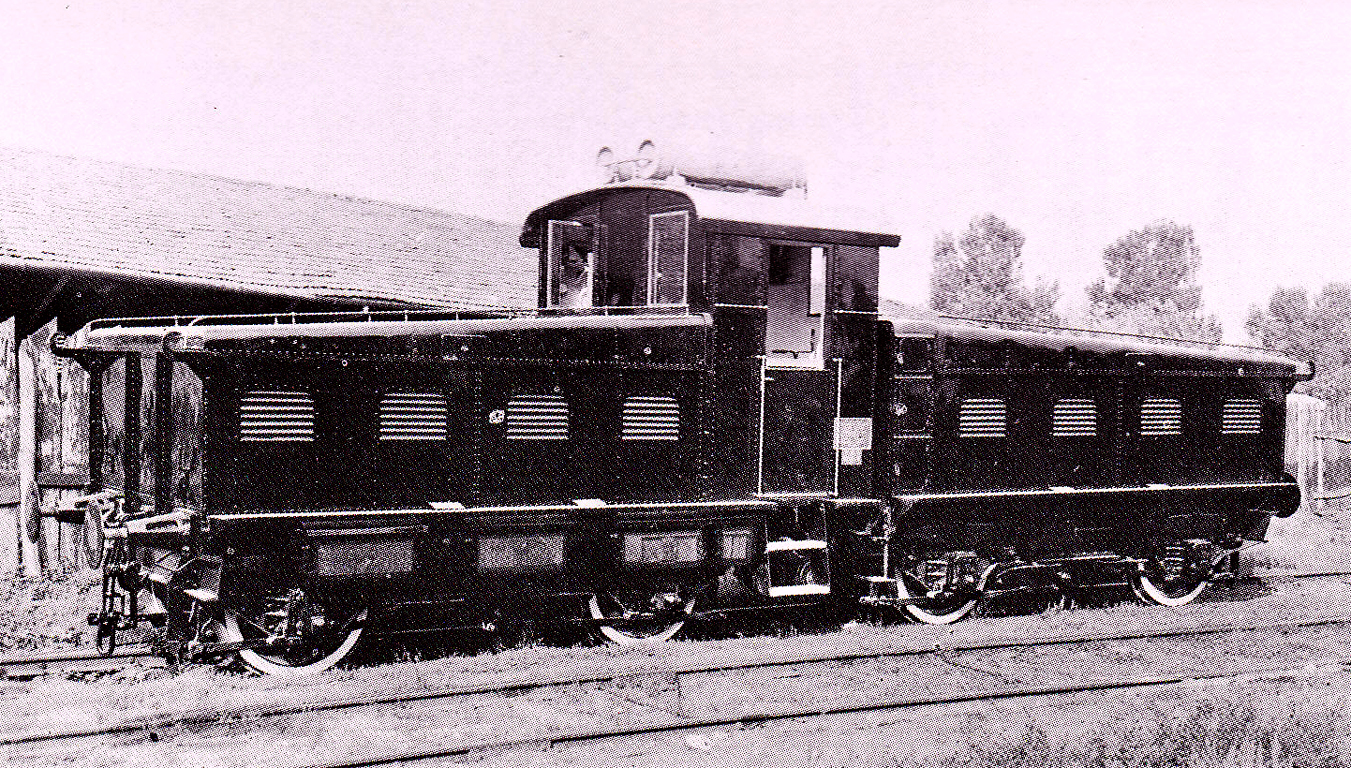
- FS class E.421
Type and origin
- Power type: Electric
- Builder: Carminati & Toselli and TIBB
- Build date: 1921
- Total produced: 1
Specifications
- Configuration
  - UIC: Bo′Bo′
- Gauge: 1,435 mm (4 ft 8 1/2 in) standard gauge
- Wheel diameter: 1,040 mm (40.94 in)
- Length: 11.325 m (37 ft 1 7/8 in)
- Loco weight: 64 t (63.0 long tons; 70.5 short tons)
- Electric system/s: Battery electric
- Traction motors: DC
Performance figures
- Maximum speed: 25 km/h (16 mph)
- Power output: 140 kW (190 hp) continuous
Career
- Operators: FS

The FS Class E.421 locomotive of the Italian State Railways (FS) was a battery electric locomotive, built as a single unit (E.421.1) and used for shunting at the old Milano Centrale railway station. It was the only battery electric locomotive to be registered in the FS fleet.

== History ==
The E.421 locomotive was built by Carminati_&_Toselli in 1921, with electrical equipment by Tecnomasio Italiano Brown Boveri (TIBB). The batteries were built by Società Generale Italiana Accumulatori. The batteries were housed in the two bonnets. They weighed 30 tons and supplied electric power at a voltage of 450 V, which operated the four traction motors, one for each axle. The E.421 was used for shunting at the old central station of Milan, particularly in the western area, terminus of the Varese railway, which was electrified with a third rail. It was withdrawn from the service after only two years, in 1923, owing to its onerous maintenance requirements and short operating period - about one hour between charges.

It was stored for a few years, and there was a proposal to convert it to third rail operation, but this was not implemented. The E.421 was scrapped around 1935.
