= HŽ series 1061 =

Class of Croatian electric locomotives

JŽ series362 / SŽ series 362 / HŽ series 1061
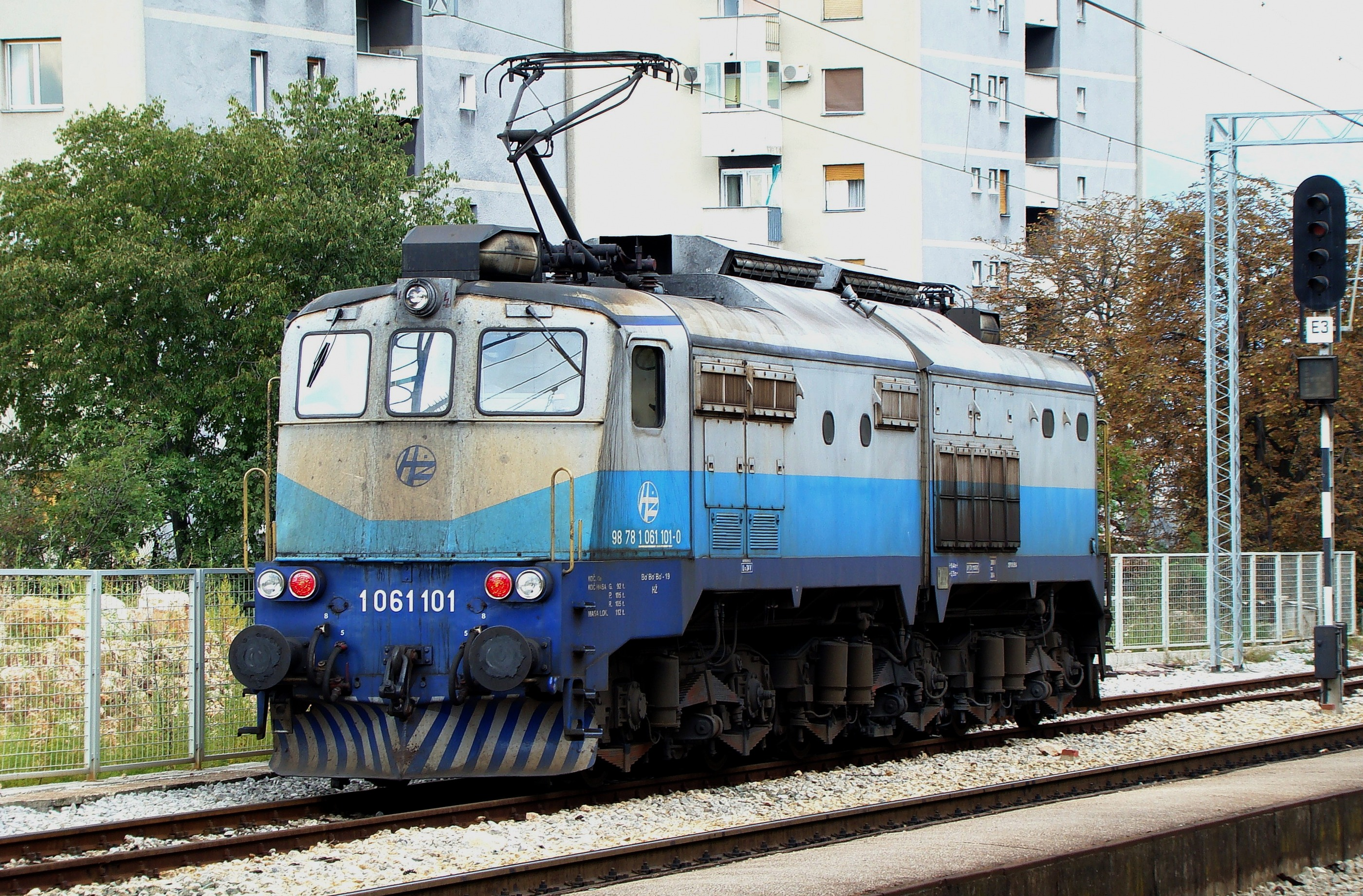
- Croatian Railways Series 1061
Type and origin
- Power type: Electric
- Builder: Breda, Ansaldo, Italy
- Build date: 1960s
- Total produced: 34
Specifications
- Configuration
  - AAR: B-B-B
  - UIC: Bo′Bo′Bo′
- Gauge: 1,435 mm (4 ft 8 1/2 in) standard gauge
- Length: 1061-0: 18,400 mm (60 ft 4 in); 1061-1: 19,440 mm (63 ft 9 in)
- Loco weight: 108 tonnes (106 long tons; 119 short tons)
- Electric system/s: 3000 V DC Catenary
- Current pickup: Pantograph
Performance figures
- Maximum speed: 120 km/h (75 mph)
- Power output: 2,640 kW (3,540 hp), 310 A, 3000/2 V
Career
- Nicknames: "Breda", "Žutka", "Mehovka"
- Locale: Croatia, Slovenia
- Disposition: Decommissioned in 2008 (Slovenia) and 2012 (Croatia)

The HŽ series 1061 was a 6-axle articulated electric locomotive series that was used by Croatian Railways (Croatian: hrvatske željeznice, HŽ). In Slovenia it is known as SŽ series 362. This locomotive, built jointly by Ansaldo and Breda, is derived from the Italian FS Class E636 and was originally donated by the Italian government. It was known as JŽ series 362 in the SFRJ. It was mostly used on the Rijeka - Zagreb railway and some auxiliary branches of this line. With the conversion of the Rijeka - Zagreb railway from 3KV DC electrical system to the 25 KV AC catenary, these locomotives were retired in 2012. Almost identical locomotives of this type on the Slovenian Railways were phased out in 2008.

== History ==
A locomotive was needed which could operate on a mountain railway line with very hilly terrain. The steam and diesel locomotives at that time could not fulfil the request, as they could not generate sufficient power. Therefore, the line was electrified, at the then common voltage of 3 kV DC. These locomotives were deployed on this line between 1960 and 1964 (numbers 001 to 019) and between 1968 and 1969 (numbers 101 to 110). The locomotives are split in two series:

- JŽ 362.001-040 (First Series) : 40 locomotives built between 1960 and 1967, 35 between 1960 and 1964, 5 more until 1967.
- JŽ 362.101-110 (Second Series): 10 locomotives built in 1968. These differ by having a higher axle load of 20t per axle and some minor improvements to the basic structure.

The locomotives were originally colored in a yellow and pine green colour scheme, which caused it to earn the nickname "žutka" ("yellow") amongst Croatian engineers; the Slovenian engineers instead adopted the nickname "meh" ("bellows") due to the articulated design resembling fire-blowing bellows. The Croatian locomotives were eventually repainted into the new grey-light blue-dark blue livery, while the Slovenian ones kept the Yugoslav livery until retirement.

After the breakup of Yugoslavia, Slovenian Railways got 18 series 0 locomotives, while Croatian Railways got the rest.

Later, most of the electrified lines in Croatia were re-electrified to 25 kV AC, and the HŽ series 1061, which used 3 kV DC, was since then only deployed on the Šapjane-Rijeka-Moravice Line. This line has been later re-electrified to the standard voltage as well, and in December 2012 all of the locomotives have been withdrawn.

In Slovenia, where 3 kV DC is still the standard voltage, Slovenian Railways started replacing series 362 with series 541 in 2005, and in July 2009 the last locomotive had a farewell drive. A couple of the locomotives were sold to other countries, one was acquired by the Slovenian Railway Museum, and the rest were scrapped.

== Technology ==
The electrical part is similar and derived from FS Class E636, and in some parts from FS Class E646. Like E636, JŽ 362 has six motors, each providing 440 kW (590 hp) (1st series) and 4,725 kW (6,336 hp) (2nd series), and rheostatic regulation; the tractive effort is also higher (360 kN or 81,000 lb_{f} on start, 283 kN or 64,000 lb_{f} continuous

On 1st series two La TA 241 Westinghouse compressors provide air for pneumatic systems; the 42 V batteries are recharged by a 2.83 kW (3.80 hp) dynamo, which provides a current of 68 A, activated by the rheostat and motors 1.1 kW (1.5 hp) fans, model "Marelli/Koncar".

On 2nd series compressors and battery recharge systems are identical, but fans are 3 kW (4.0 hp) "Aeroto" type and are activated by alternators, providing a 380 V AC three-phase voltage.

Also, rheostatic type braking is possible, on a similar way used on experimental unit E636.082.

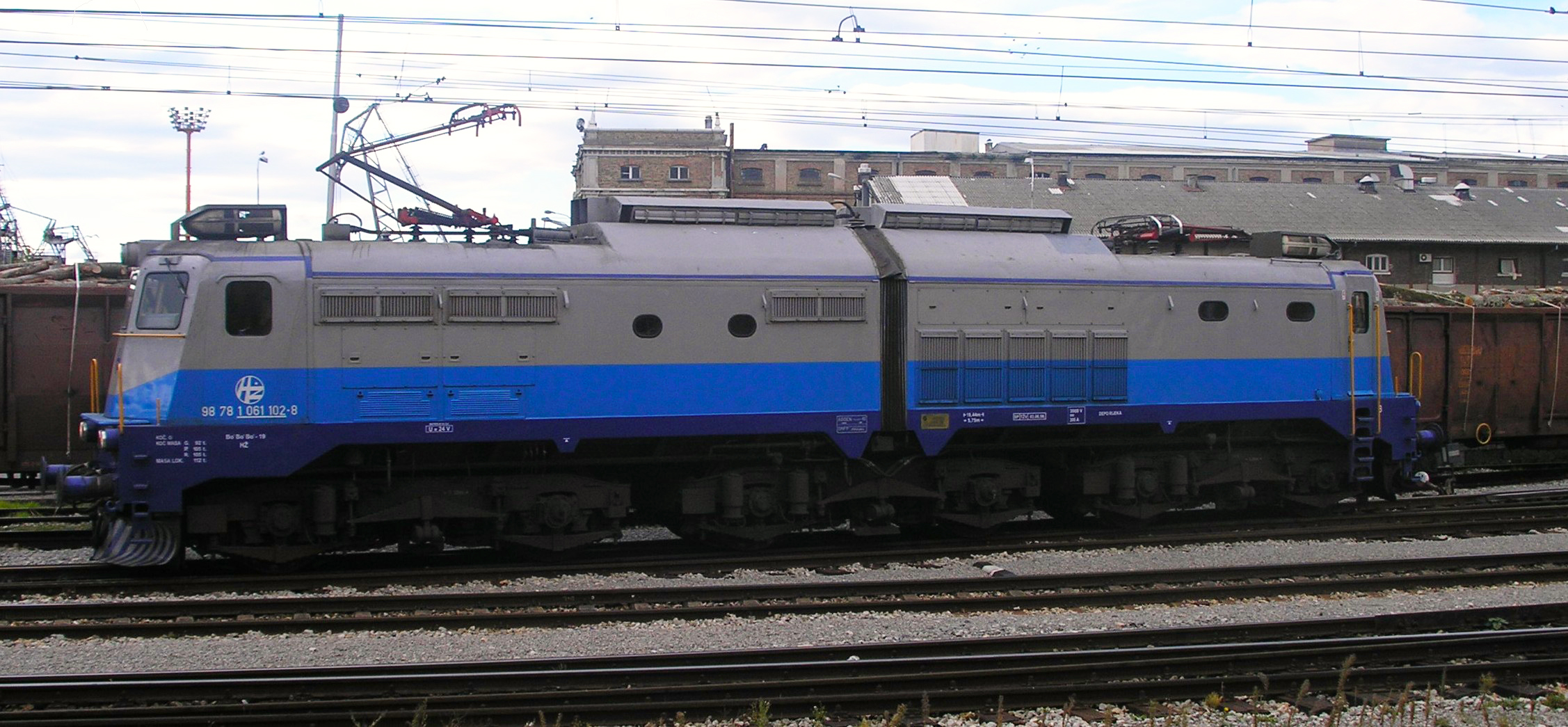
HŽ series 1061 in full length

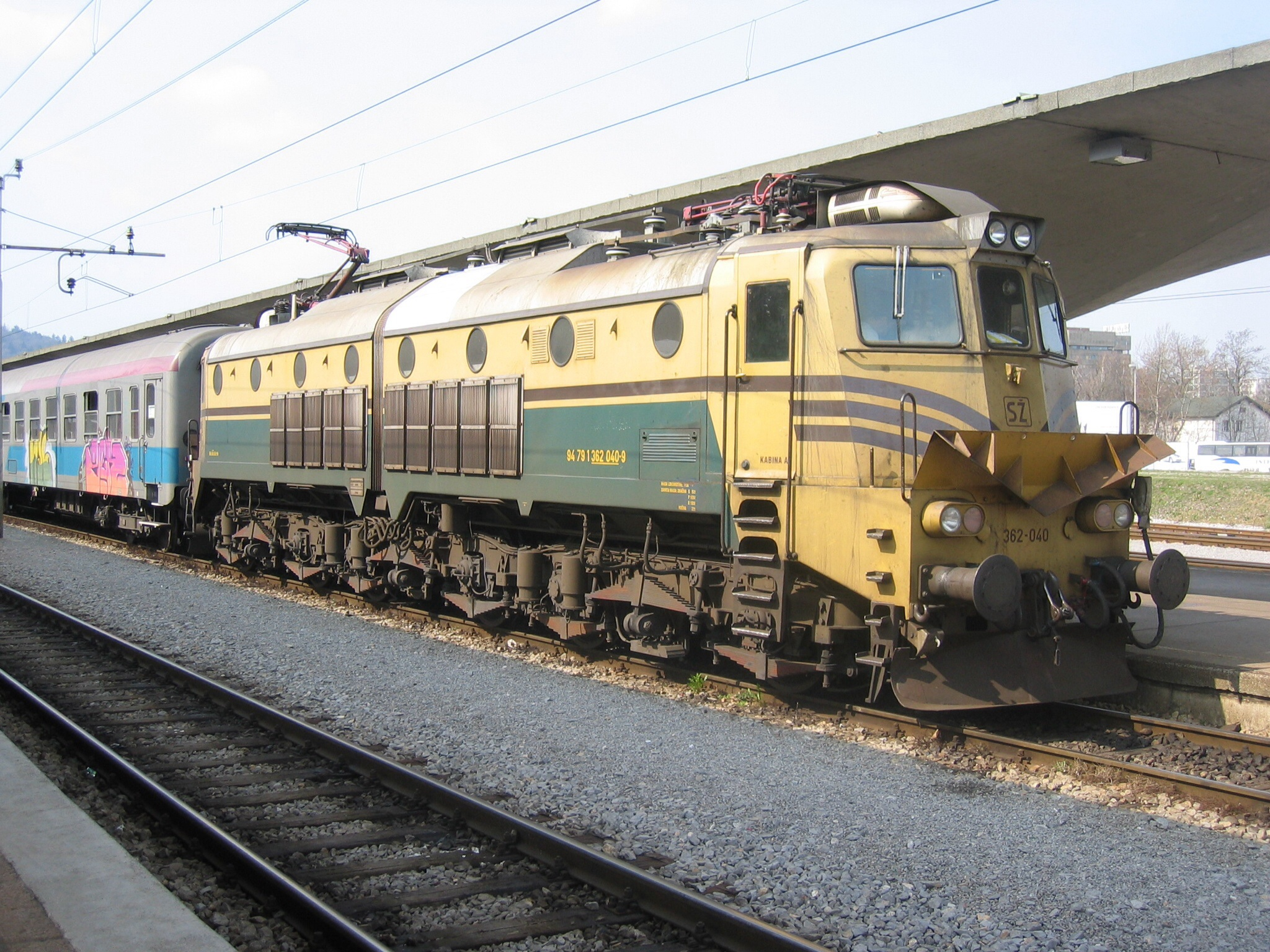
SŽ series 362, still bearing the original yellow livery
