= Curinga train disaster =

Italian railway accident

The Curinga train disaster, also known as the Lamezia Terme train disaster, was a railway accident occurred on 21 November 1980 between Curinga and Eccellente stations, in the province of Catanzaro, Italy.

Initial body count was estimated in 10 dead and 80 injured, later updated to 20 and 122 respectively. The final count went up to 29 victims and 104 wounded.

Ferrovie dello Stato train 587 was traveling southbound from Rome to Siracusa on the Salerno-Reggio Calabria railway. At 2.40 a.m., shortly after leaving Lamezia Terme station and heading to Paola, rammed into some loaded cars lost by freight train 40679, a 41-cars convoy from the same operator leaving Lamezia Terme for Reggio Calabria.

The freight train had crossed Eccellente station without anyone noticing it lost 28 of its cars and was missing its tail lights, and later stopped at Vibo Pizzo station understanding something went wrong. The boxcars got detached from the convoy at kilometer 266+200, when a clamp broke and set the boxcars free. The runaway cars came to a stop on the tracks.

Train 587 driver tried to brake at the last moment, but the train was traveling at 120 km/h and could not possibly be stopped in less than 1000 meters. Being in a dark night and the runaway cars missing their tail lights (electricity is provided by the engine), the available distance was far too short to stop the passenger train. The passenger train hit the cars and derailed, four of its coaches swerving on the northbound track.

Despite the severity of the accident, the derailment most probably caused only injuries. Before the train conductor could call for an emergency, a second passenger train, Espresso 588 (the same passenger service, but traveling northbound toward Salerno) crashed on the derailed 587's engine at over 60 km/h. The first four coaches of the 588 train derailed and tumbled into an escarpment. Some of the southbound train's coaches were crushed or broken by the impact.

== First response ==
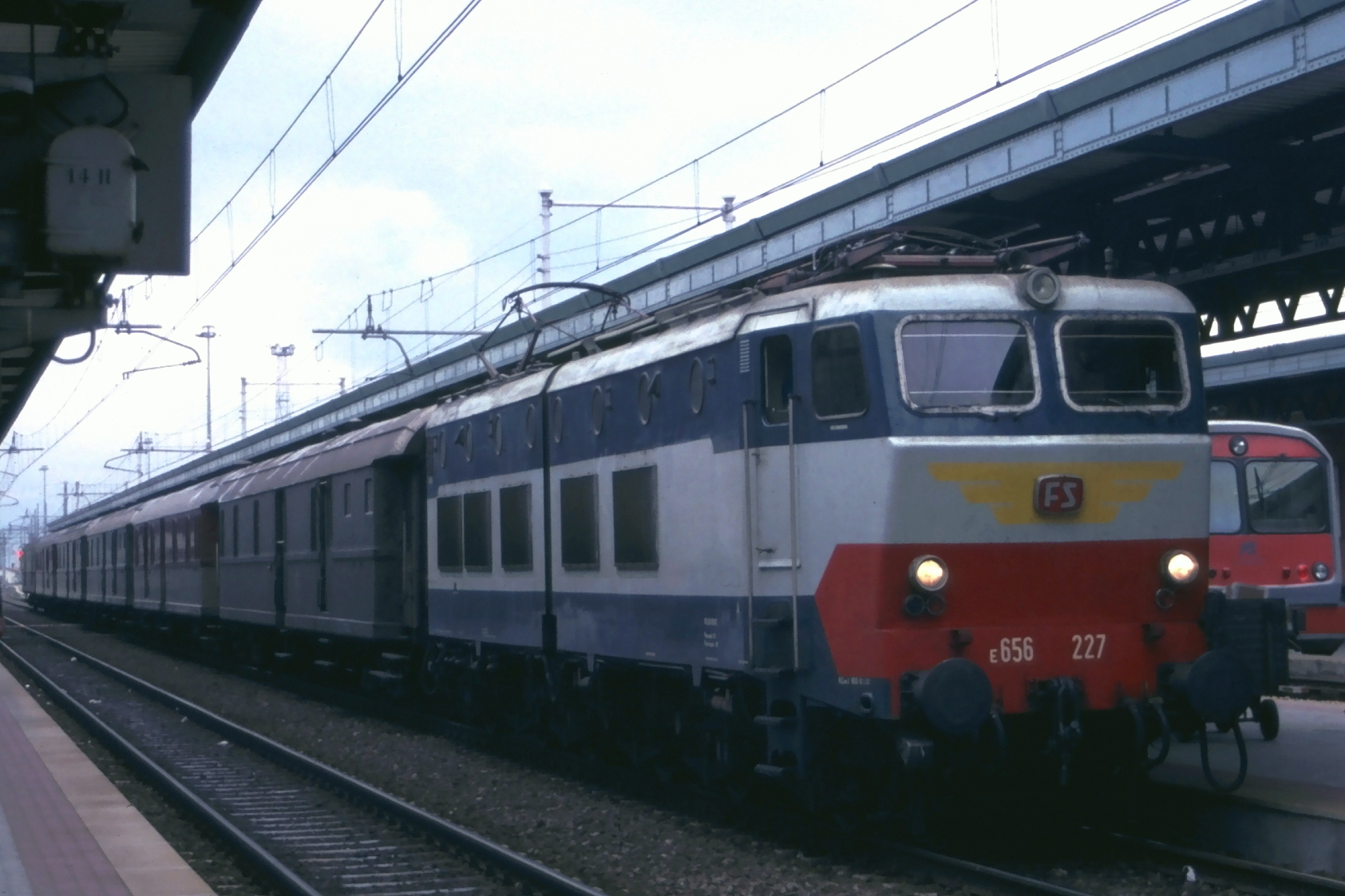
An FS Class E656, similar to the two engines damaged in the accident.

Vigili del Fuoco rescue teams were dispatched from Vibo Valentia, Lamezia Terme and Catanzaro, along with Polizia di Stato, Guardia di Finanza and Carabinieri. Railway crews immediately begun to remove and dismantle the damaged coaches, in order to allow recover of the wounded trapped in the wreck, aided by the security forces personnel.

Hospitals in Lamezia, Vibo and Catanzaro were overrun by the medical emergency, but ultimately managed to sustain the pressure thanks to help from Soveria Mannelli and Tropea clinics taking over medical assistance for patients with less severe wounds.

The rescue operations took two full days, allowing regular service from 24 November.

The accident news coverage was short, since just two days later country newspaper's attention was diverted to the tragic Irpinia earthquake.

Engine FS Class E656.075 was dismantled in July 1983, the first in its class to be written off. FS Class E656.280 dismantled a few days later.

== Causes ==
A broken clamp is an unusual but not unheard of event. Steel clamps sometimes experience fatigue or corrosion damage, so a failure is accounted as a possibility. In case of a clamp failure the loss of a train section breaks off the pneumatic brake circuit: lack of pressure engages emergency brakes on both parts of the convoy and alert the engineers.

Apparently the brake emergency system worked fine, but with the engine at full throttle and the train much lighter than expected the engineer didn't notice the emergency and the head of the train failed to stop.

Public Prosecutor’s Office charged the freight train drivers, the Eccellente stationmaster and a railwayman with involuntary manslaughter, for failing to notice the loss of the boxcars. Ultimately, station personnel was deemed guilty, not having followed proper procedures.

An early technical survey showed that maintenance status of the rolling stock was fair, track infrastructure was good and adequate to current safety standards. The semi-automatic block signaling was active at the moment, but that system required a routine check of passing trains to be done by station personnel. The rule was well known and officially enforced at the time. Fully automatic block control would have avoided the tragedy (flashing a red light at the passenger train), but up until the 1990s was installed only on high capacity main lines (about 1/8 of the total network).
