= FS Class E.656 =

Class of Italian electric locomotives

FS class E.656
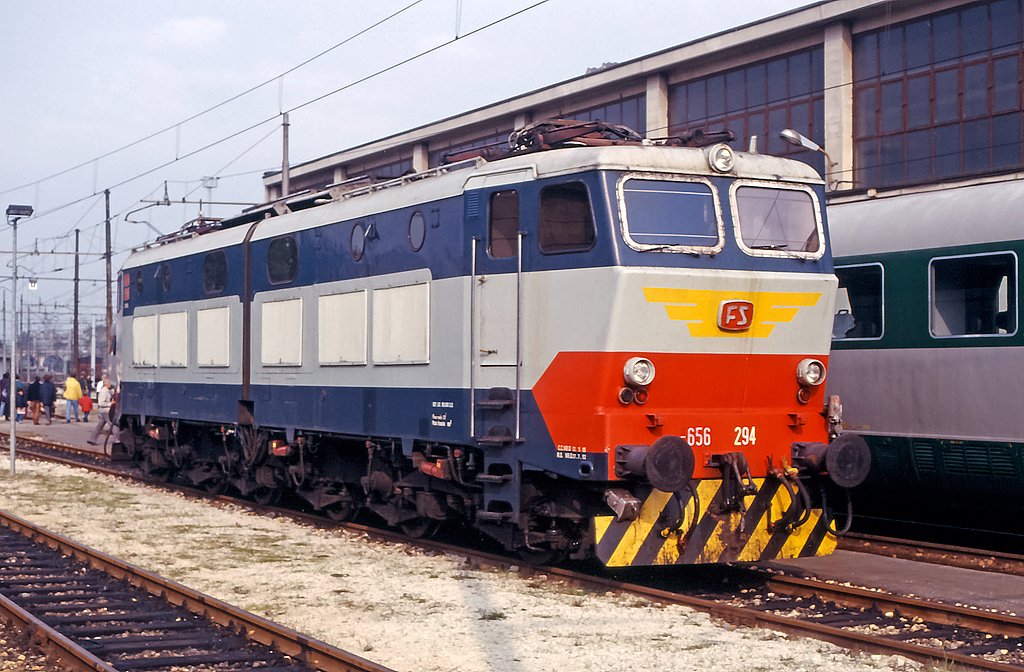
- Unit E.656.294 in original livery
Type and origin
- Power type: Electric
- Builder: Officine Casaralta, Officine Reggiane, SOFER, TIBB componentistica Ercole Marelli, Ansaldo, Asgen, Italtrafo
- Build date: 1975–1989
- Total produced: 461
Specifications
- Configuration
  - AAR: B-B-B
  - UIC: Bo′Bo′Bo′
- Gauge: 1,435 mm (4 ft 8 1/2 in) standard gauge
- Wheel diameter: 1,250 mm (49.21 in)
- Length: 18.29 m (60 ft 1/8 in)
- Width: 3.00 m (9 ft 10 1/8 in)
- Height: 3.80 m (12 ft 5 5/8 in)
- Loco weight: 120 t (118.1 long tons; 132.3 short tons)
- Electric system/s: 3,000 V DC Catenary
- Current pickup: Pantograph
- Traction motors: DC
- Safety systems: RSC4; SCMT
Performance figures
- Maximum speed: 150 km/h (93 mph)
- Power output: Continuous: 4,200 kW (5,630 hp); One hour: 4,800 kW (6,440 hp)
- Tractive effort: 249 kN (56,000 lbf)
Career
- Operators: FS Trenitalia
- Nicknames: "Caimano" (Caiman)
- Disposition: Decommissioned in 2025 (except historic trains)

FS class E.655
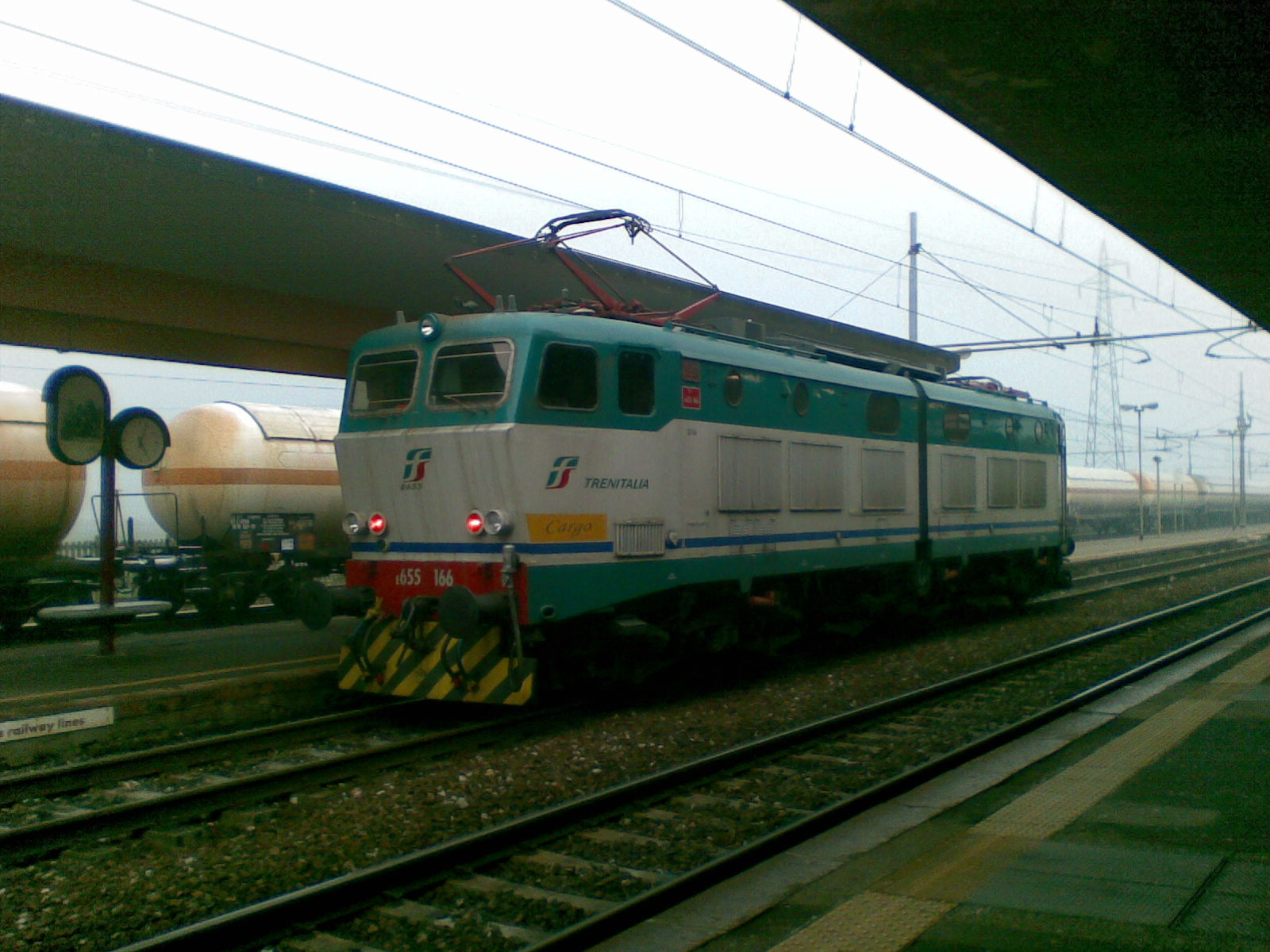
- E.655.166 Trenitalia Cargo
Type and origin
- Only differences from Class E656 above are shown
- Power type: Electric
Specifications
Performance figures
- Maximum speed: 120 km/h (75 mph)
- Tractive effort: 300 kN (67,400 lbf)

The Class E.656 is an Italian articulated rheostatic-type electric locomotive built from 1975 to 1989. An evolution of the E.646, they are mixed traffic locomotives, and have been used on every kind of train, ranging from freight to intercity passenger transport.

The E.656 is nicknamed "Caimano" (Caiman).

== Technical details ==
The hull is divided in two parts, each one with its own twin axle bogie, plus a central bogie in the middle. Each bogie mounts four DC motors, each providing 400 kW (540 hp), for a total of 12.

The initial project speed was 160 km/h (99 mph), but later it was reduced to 150 due to stability problems; further, the heavy mass of the locomotive did not allow the use of rheostatic braking.

Recently, many E.656s have been transferred to the Cargo Division of Trenitalia to haul freight trains. The gear ratio has been reduced from 28/61 to 23/66, and the speed limit to 120 km/h (75 mph). The modified units form the Class E.655.

=== Series ===
The E.656 class is officially subdivided by FS into three series:

- 1st series (001 - 307)
- 2nd series (401 - 550)
- 3rd series (551 - 608)

The differences between series regard electrical and mechanical equipment.

The 3rd series locomotives have four field weakening shunts in parallel and super-parallel motor combinations (where the other series have three), and the 78-wire cable to remote control the locomotive from a control car (Carrozza semipilota) or another Delfina-fitted locomotive.

Differences between locomotives can also be summed up as follows:

Series	Units	Features
1st	001 - 104	Motoalternators
2nd	201–251	Single static converter
3rd	252–307	Motoalternators
4th	159–200	Single Static converters (except unit 200)
5th	401–550	2 ARSA static converters
6th	551–608	2 ARSA static converters and Delfina control unit, for remote command.

=== Motors and electrical description ===
The locomotive has twelve 82/400 motors, with class B insulation, four per bogie.

They can be connected in the same combinations used on E.646:

- Series: all motors are connected in series, five shunts;
- Series-Parallel: two branches of six motors each, five shunts;
- Parallel: three branches of four motors each, three shunts (four on 6th series);
- SuperParallel: four branches of three motors each, three shunts (four on 6th series);

Like their predecessors, E.656s have a rheostat (31 resistors subdivided in 21 packs, for a total resistance of 17,015 ohm) that, by varying its resistance, gradually regulates the current to the motors on starts, and on each time a transition to the next combination is made; however, differently from older Italian types, rheostatic exclusion is not controlled manually, by default.

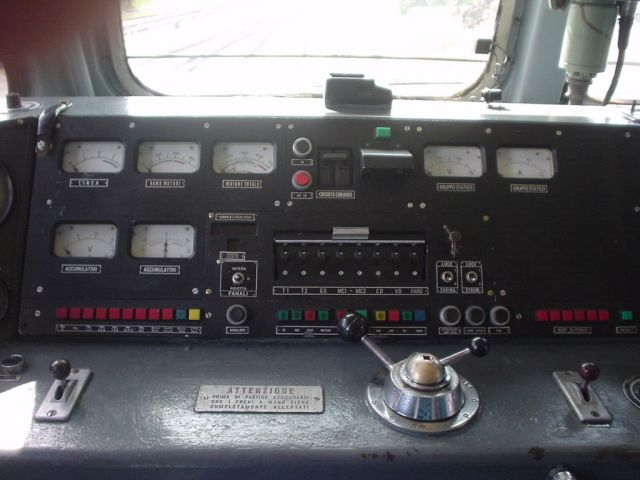
Driver console of an E.656; the lever in the middle is the combination selector.

The driver selects the desired combination, which is automatically accomplished by a system which, through a particular array of logic gates and other components (capacitors, resistors, etc.), called "RAE" (Relè Accelerazione Elettronico), controls a rotating device (called avviatore automatico). The driver selects the maximum exclusion current through a potentiometer on his desk, and the system, when the c.e.m.f. present in the motors brings the current (which is read by transducers) to a value lower than the set current, makes the avviatore advance, closing the rheostat contactors (thus shunting the relative resistors) as speed builds up, until it is totally excluded; similarly it may go backwards, when the current reaches high levels in relation to speed.

The different connections of the motors in the various combinations are accomplished by closing various contactors; their set-ups during transitions are handled by a device called "CEM" (Commutatore Escluditore Motori).

If rheostatic exclusion is needed to be controlled finely (e.g. on coupling maneuvers, or in case of a heavy train or poor adherence situations), the driver can use the "PAC" (Pomello Avanzamento Comandato), a small lever that makes the "avviatore automatico" advance or go backwards step by step (for "Series" combination only).

On Third series locomotives (official classification), many functions such as the ones of RAE, Avviatore Automatico, CEM, etc., are assumed by an electronic control unit (called Delfina) derived from the ones employed on FS Class E.444.

The rheostat is robust and designed to stand high currents, however it cannot for an excessive period of time, as there is the risk of overheating; the driver has to keep this in mind when driving. When the temperature is too high (greater than 200 °C or 392 °F), the "VR" (Ventilazione Reostato, Rheostat Fans) light starts to blink on the driver's console to warn him.

=== Auxiliary systems ===
The following components form the auxiliary systems:

- two W242 compressors used for air production;
- an asynchronous 17 kW three-phase motor that is used to activate the four groups of motor-cooling fans, 7 groups for rheostat cooling and 2 fans for cabin air conditioning;
- a 3 kVA transformer used to recharge the 24 V batteries, plus another four for cabin heating and another one for glass defrosters.

They are fed in various ways, depending on the series:

- on 1st and 3rd series by two 125 kVA motoalternators, activated by a double-collector 95 kW 3000 V motor;
- on 2nd and 4th series by a single 3000 V DC/450 V AC 60 Hz 180 kVA static converter;
- on 5th and 6th series two 3000 V DC/450 V AC 60 Hz 120 kVA static converters.

Motor cooling fans are automatically activated when the reverser is in non-neutral position, while rheostat fans activate when the temperature into the rheostat's resistors reaches 65 °C (149 °F) or they are manually activated by the driver via an apposite button.

== Significant units ==
- E.655.200 had been fitted with two ARSA static converters for testing purposes.
- E.656.458 and E.656.468 mount digital Octopus control units, which allow remote command of two or more locomotives from a single driving cabin. These units also have four weakening field shunts in Parallel and SuperParallel combinations as sixth series' units.

== Accidents and incidents ==
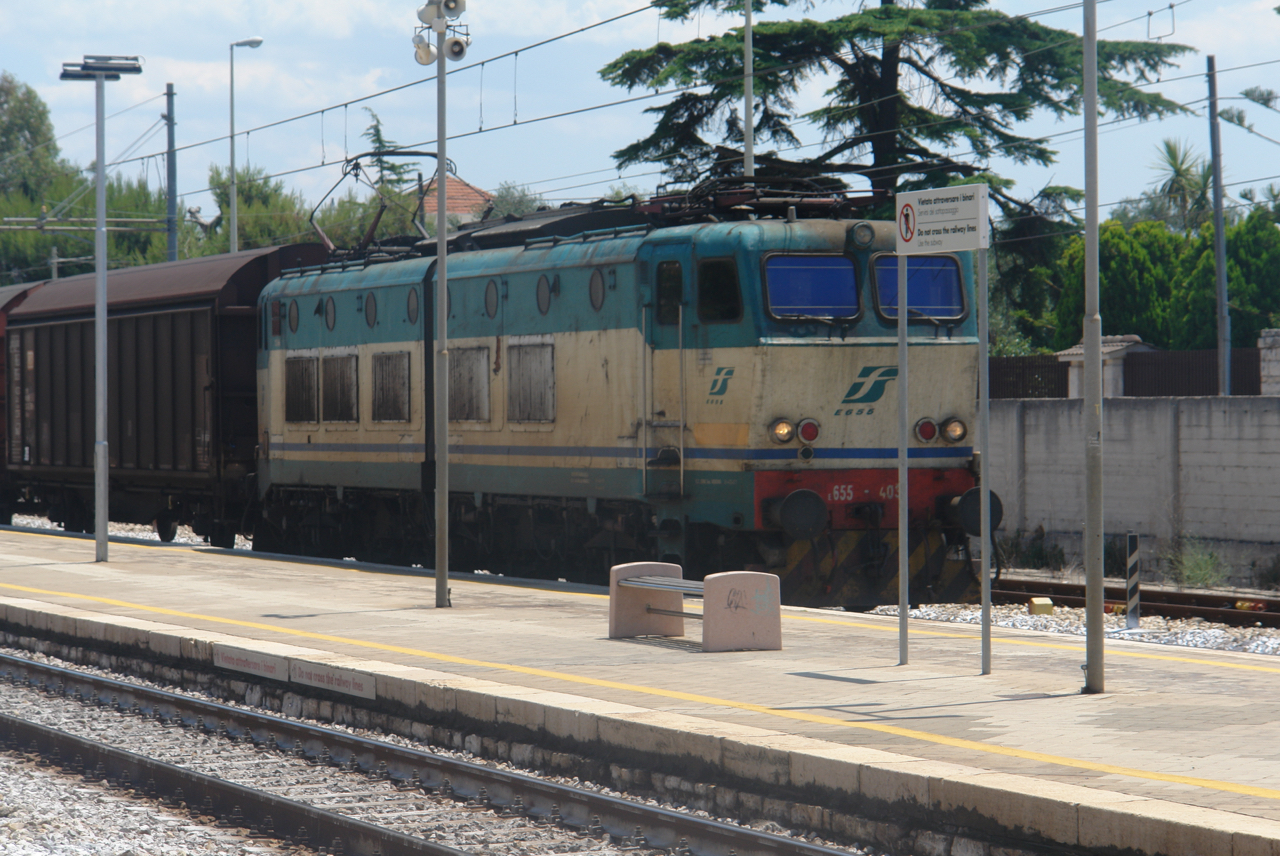
The E.655.403 (previously E.656.403), the unit involved in the Roma Casilina accident.

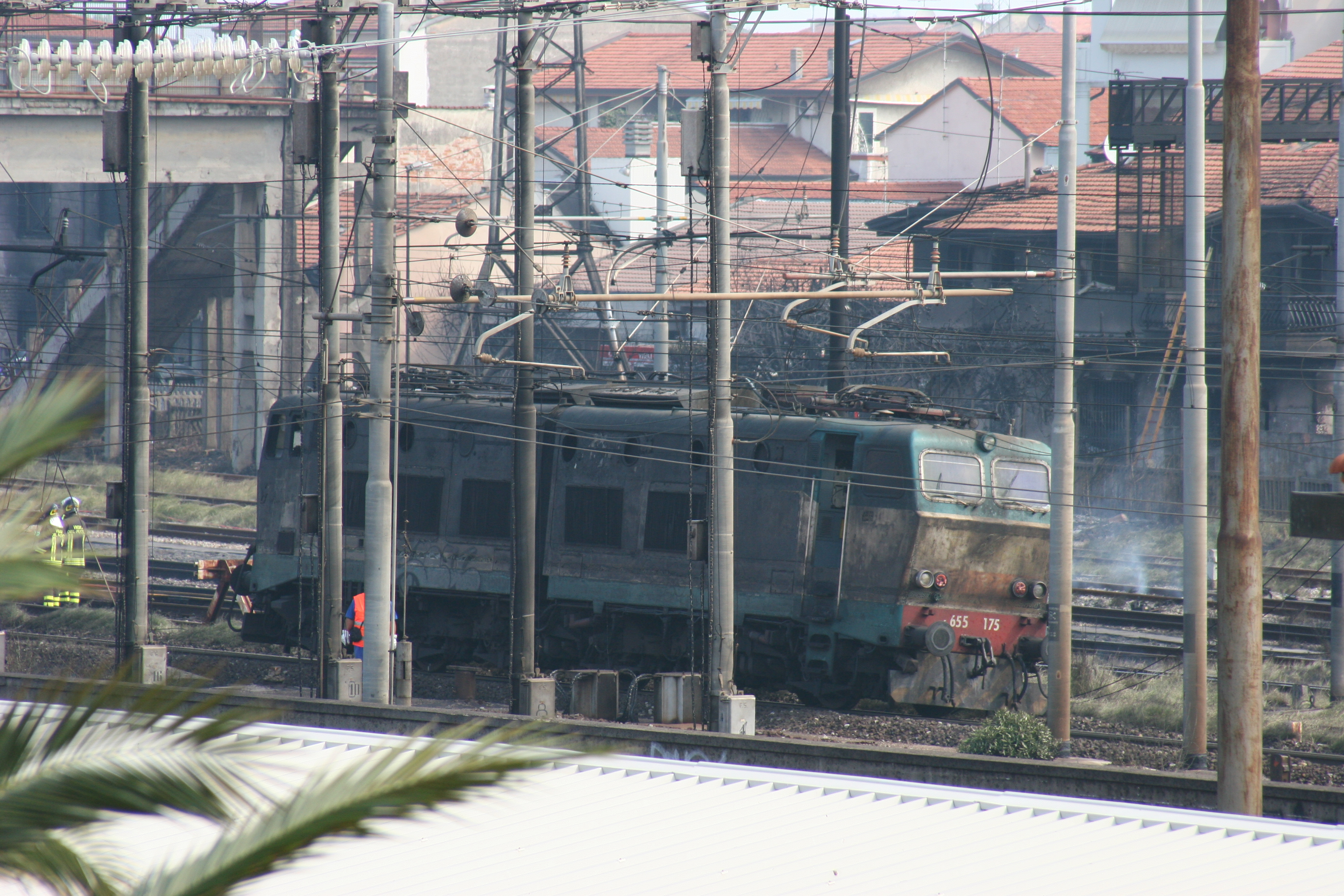
The E.655.175, the unit involved in Viareggio train derailment the morning after.

- November 21, 1980 Curinga train disaster: Units 075 and 280 are written off. Both scrapped in July 1983
- 14 March 1995 near Chiusi-Città della Pieve train E.656.542 missed a stop signal, crashing into E.656.181
- 5 July near Cuzzago, E.656.272 impact against another train, causing 2 death and 51 injured.
- 20 August 1996 near Bologna San Ruffillo E.656.225 derail into a closed rail, 2 injured.
- 2 August 1997 near Roma Casilina, E.656.403 traction hook broke, causing derailment of its passenger car. Four were seriously injured. The accident was caused by velocity: the train was going at 90 km/h instead 30 km/h.
- 4 June 2000 near Solignano a cargo train crashed intoanother cargo train; four deaths and one injury.
- 20 July 2001, E.656.032 was totaled in the Rometta Marea derailment
- 5 May 2004, E.656.608 derailed near Libarna and collided with a freight train with the E.655.511 and E.655.505.
- 29 June 2009, E.655.175 was the locomotive hauling the freight train which derailed and caught fire at Viareggio.

== See also ==
- FS Class E.646
- FS Class E.636
