= FS Class E.646 =

Class of Italian electric locomotives

FS class E.646
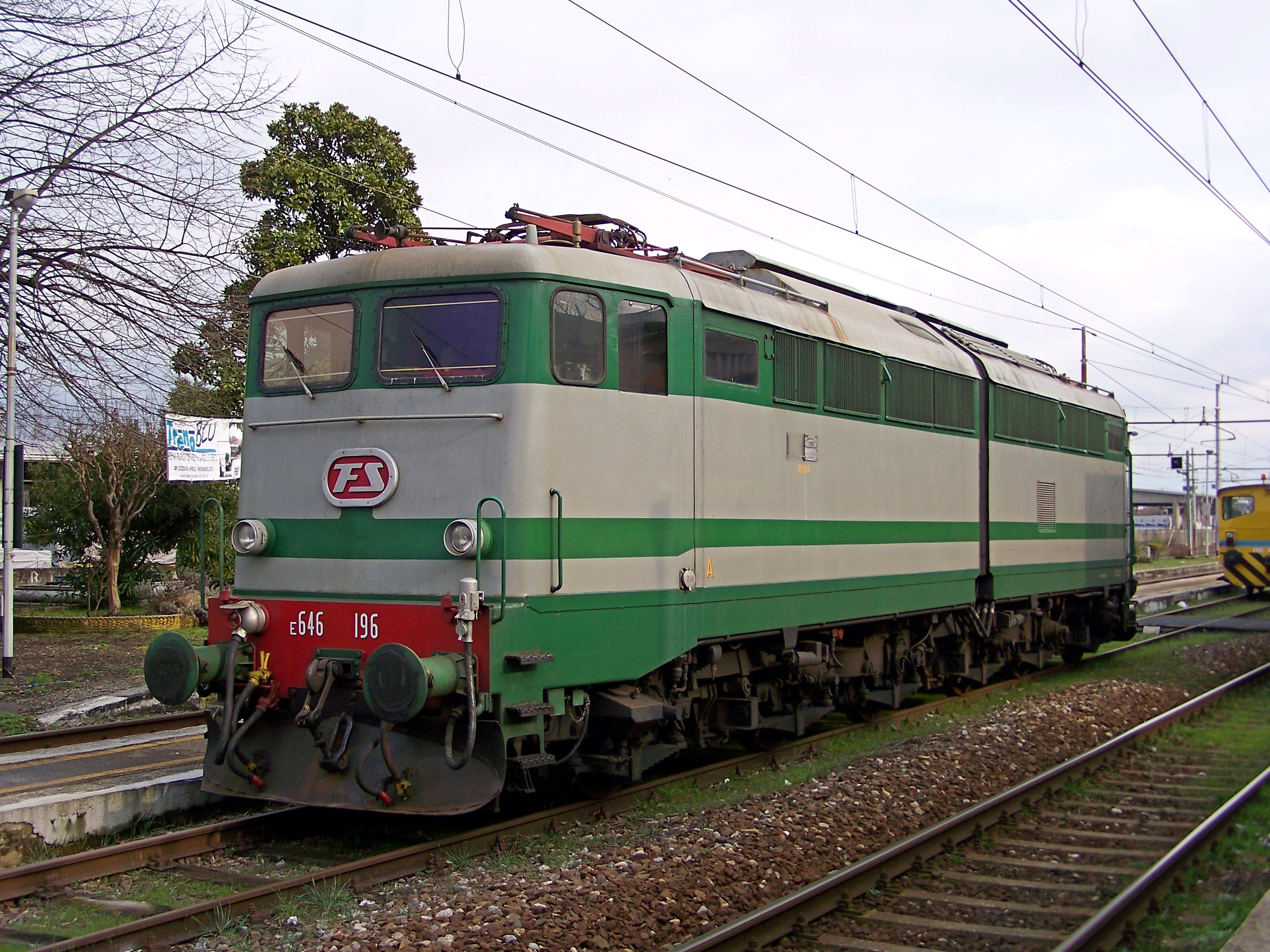
- E.646 in original livery
Type and origin
- Power type: Electric
- Builder: TIBB
- Build date: 1958-1967
Specifications
- Configuration
  - UIC: Bo-Bo-Bo
- Wheel diameter: 1.250 m (49.21 in)
- Wheelbase: 13.550 m (44 ft 5 1/2 in) between bogie pivots 2.850 m (9 ft 4 1/4 in) between axles on each bogie
- Length: 18.290 m (60 ft 1/8 in)
- Width: 3.013 m (9 ft 10 5/8 in)
- Height: 4.296 m (14 ft 1 1/8 in)
- Loco weight: 110–112 t (108–110 long tons; 121–123 short tons)
- Electric system/s: 3,000 V DC Catenary
- Current pickup: Pantograph
- Traction motors: DC
- Transmission: 25/64 gear ratio
- Loco brake: Oerlikon FV4
- Safety systems: RSC4; some units (about 40) have also been fitted with SCMT
Performance figures
- Maximum speed: 140 km/h (87 mph)
- Power output: hourly: 4,320 kW (5,790 hp) - continuous: 3,780 kW (5,070 hp)
- Tractive effort: 233 kN (52,000 lb_{f})
Career
- Operators: FS Trenitalia
- Number in class: 198
- First run: 1958
- Disposition: Decommissioned in 2009

FS class E.645
Type and origin
- Power type: Electric
- Builder: TIBB
- Build date: 1957 – 1967
Specifications
- Configuration
  - UIC: Bo-Bo-Bo
- Wheel diameter: 1.250 m (49.21 in)
- Wheelbase: 13.550 m (44 ft 5.5 in) between bogie pivots 2.580 m (8 ft 5.6 in) between axles in each bogie
- Length: 18.250 m (59 ft 10.5 in)
- Width: 3.013 m (9 ft 10.6 in)
- Height: 4.296 m (14 ft 1.1 in)
- Loco weight: 110–112 t (108–110 long tons; 121–123 short tons)
- Electric system/s: 3,000 V DC Catenary
- Current pickup: Pantograph
- Traction motors: DC series
- Transmission: 21/68 gear ratio
- Safety systems: RSC4
Performance figures
- Maximum speed: 120 km/h (75 mph)
- Power output: 3,780 kW (5,070 hp)
- Tractive effort: 286 kN (64,000 lb_{f})
Career
- Operators: FS Trenitalia
- Number in class: 97
- First run: 1958
- Disposition: Decommissioned in 2009

The FS E.645 and E.646 are two classes of similar electric locomotives used on Italian railways. They were introduced during the 1950s and they were retired in 2009.

== History ==
The E.646 and E.645 locomotives project was started in 1953, with a new model engine that was to be installed on the modified chassis of the already-existing six-axle locomotive E.636. A similar concept for a 4-axle locomotive led to the development of the E.444 high-speed locomotive in the 1960s.

The first prototypes were delivered in October 1958. The first thirty-seven individual locomotives differed only in their livery: twenty built for passenger traffic were painted in grey-green, while seventeen built for goods were painted in auburn. Later, the freight locomotives were reclassed E.645. The total number of locomotives built amounted to 295 units.

Initially, the class E.646 was assigned to fast and heavy passenger trains while the class E.645 was assigned to heavy cargo trains, though it occasionally pulled also passenger trains. Responding to the need for push-pull locomotives, units E.646 187 to 210 were manufactured with control circuits and connectors to be remotely commanded. With the availability of newer locomotive types the E.646 were replaced for fast passenger trains by E.444 and later by E.656 in long range passenger trains. Eventually most of the class E.646 was converted to FS Trenitalia push-pull services, while the remaining others were converted in E.645 and assigned to goods services until 2009. They were replaced by E.464 engines on regional services.

== Technical details ==
Class E.646 did not follow the standard Italian class numbering rules where the last digit indicates the number of motors, as it mounted 12 two by two mechanically coupled 82-333FS type electric motors, each providing 360 kilowatts (480 hp), fed from the 3000 V catenary. These motors were more powerful than those mounted on the predecessor E.636 class and able to improve performance up to 50% with only a 20% increase in weight; this also increased the mass available for adhesion, giving it better hauling ability.

Maximum speed was 140 km/h (87 mph) for the E.646. The E.645 had a different gear ratio — 21/68 instead of 25/64 — which reduced the maximum speed to 120 km/h (75 mph), while increasing tractive effort. The locomotives weighed 110 t (108 long tons; 121 short tons) (E.645: 112).

To reach higher speeds, the motors could be electrically connected in four ways:

Combination	Motors set-up	Field shunts levels allowed	Maximum current allowed
Series	All motors are connected in series	Five	700 A
Series-Parallel	Two branches of six motors each	Five	1100 A
Parallel	Three branches of four motors each	Three	1650 A
Super-Parallel	Four branches of three motors each	Three (none on some 645)	1800 A

Due to the ability of the DC motors to draw very high currents at low speeds, a rheostat needed to be connected in series to the traction motors when starting the train, to avoid drawing excessive current. The rheostat was gradually shunted as speed builds up and is also reintroduced when a transition to another motor configuration is made; like almost every Italian electric locomotive since the E.626, rheostatic shunting was achieved through a controller (a lever mounted on a curved notched support, commonly called respectively maniglione and roncola in Italian) with several notches, each representing a portion of the rheostat, plus four (one for each combination) special intermediate "end combination" notches.

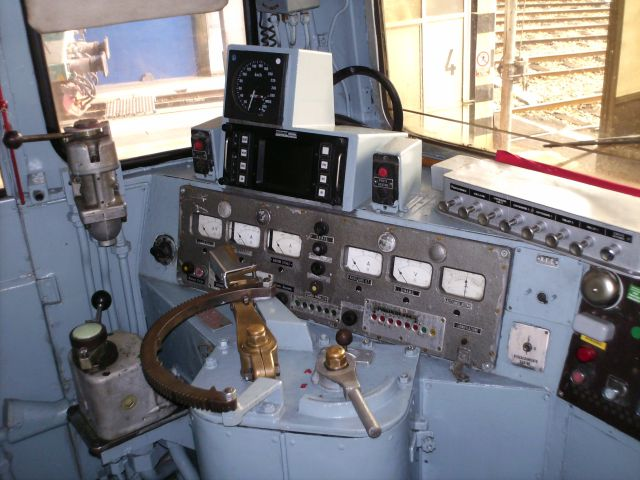
Image of E.646 cab fitted with SCMT. The lever was characteristic of most Italian rheostatic locomotives.

The driver gradually shunted the rheostat by rotating the lever counterclockwise, paying attention to not exceed the maximum allowed current (in that case, the "maximum current relay", and consequently the "Main Breaker" - IR, Interruttore Rapido - opens), until he reached the end combination notches, meaning that the rheostat is fully shunted for that combination; at this point, he could pass to the following combination or insert the field weakening shunts to further increase the motor current. There were 31, 11, 9 and 8 notches on the roncola, each representing a portion of rheostat in the respective combinations.

In the 1960s the E.646 locomotives were updated with the standard 78-wire cables, fire extinguishing systems and automatic rheostatic shunting systems (Avviatore Automatico) to permit remote commanding by driving coaches on commuter push-pull passenger services.

Air pressure was provided by two 1,000 L (260 US gal) compressors that filled the main tanks used by the braking system and other components (horn, whistle, contactors etc.).

Main auxiliary services also included the 3000 V motor cooling fans, which were also used as generators to create the voltage used to recharge the 24 V DC batteries which fed the low voltage devices (lights, relays, solenoid valves, etc.).

Some units were also fitted with static converters to feed auxiliary services and recharge batteries.

Like all non-electronic Italian locomotives, E.646 were technically simple; driving personnel could often easily fix problems and get the locomotive moving for enough time to end the service or at least free the tracks.

=== Modified E.645s ===
For testing purposes, units E.645.016 and 017 were built with an even shorter gear ratio (20/69) that allowed a maximum speed of 110 km/h (68 mph). These units were intended to be used for hauling heavy trains on steep lines. This modification was not applied to other E645s, however units 016 and 017 remained on regular service with their gear ratio for many years. Unit 016 was scrapped prematurely, after being involved in Murazze di Vado (see below) accident in 1978, while unit 017 reverted to the usual 21/68 ratio in the first half of the 1990s; however it retained the shorter roncola with considerably less notches than the usual E.645/6 ones.

== Accidents ==
On April 15, 1978, an accident involved units E.645.016 and E.636.282 in Murazze di Vado (in the province of Bologna). The train hauled by the two locomotives derailed due to damage to the line caused by a landslide, and ended poised over a slope. When the first rescue had already arrived, both locomotives were hit by an ALe 601 railcar on the express service Freccia della Laguna; the railcar coaches fell into the slope, while the locomotives piled up one on top of the other on their sides. The accident caused 32 deaths and 120 wounded. Verona's football club was travelling on the Freccia della Laguna train. They escaped unhurt because at the time of the accident they were having lunch in the restaurant wagon. After the accident, E.645.016 was scrapped.

In Florence Firenze Castello station, on March 23, 1998, unit E.646.009 was hit by EMU ETR 480-34, that was running between Rome and Bergamo, and that passed a signal at 'danger' without stopping (SPAD); the accident caused one dead and 39 wounded. The E.646 was later decommissioned.

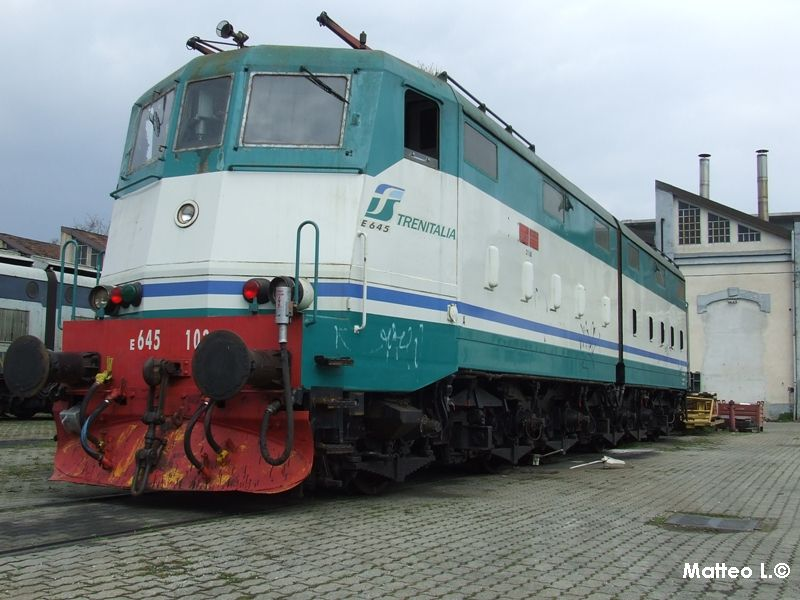
First series E.645, with FS Class E.636-like cab

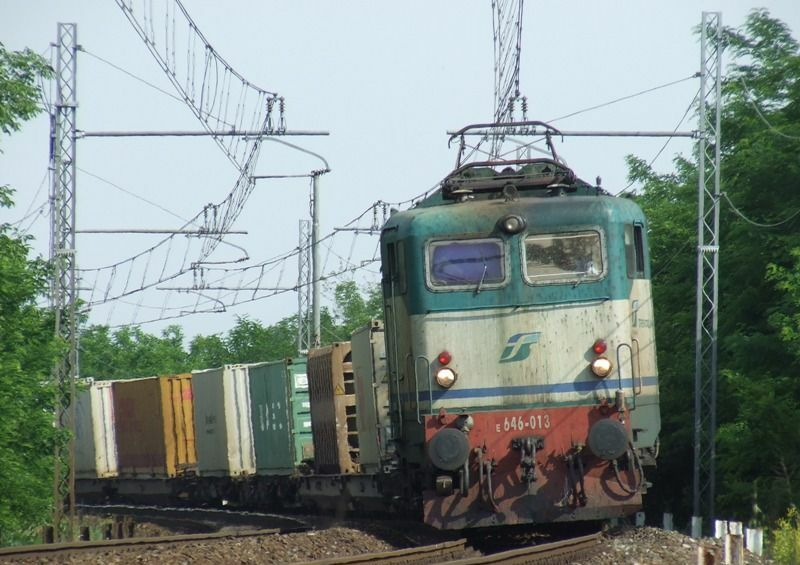
E.646 hauling a freight train

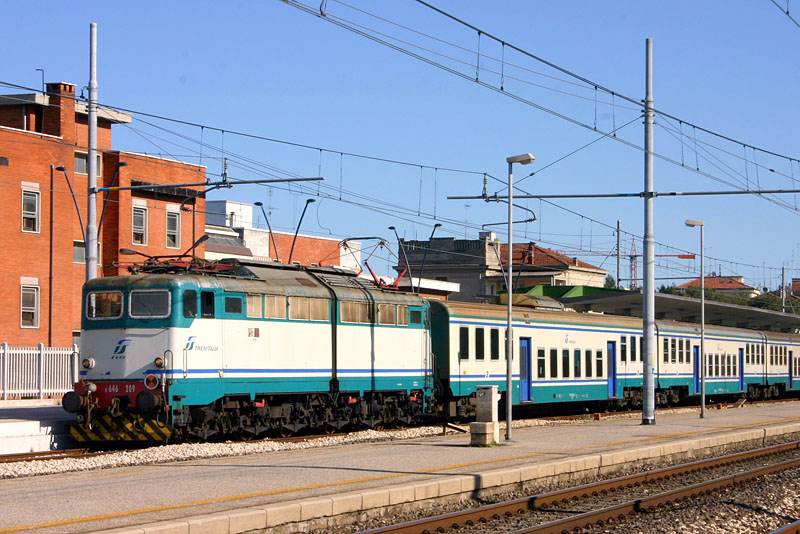
E.646 locomotive in its last livery

== See also ==
- FS Class E.636
- FS Class E.424
- FS Class E.656
- FS Class E.464
