= FS Class E.464 =

Italian railways electric locomotive class

FS class E.464
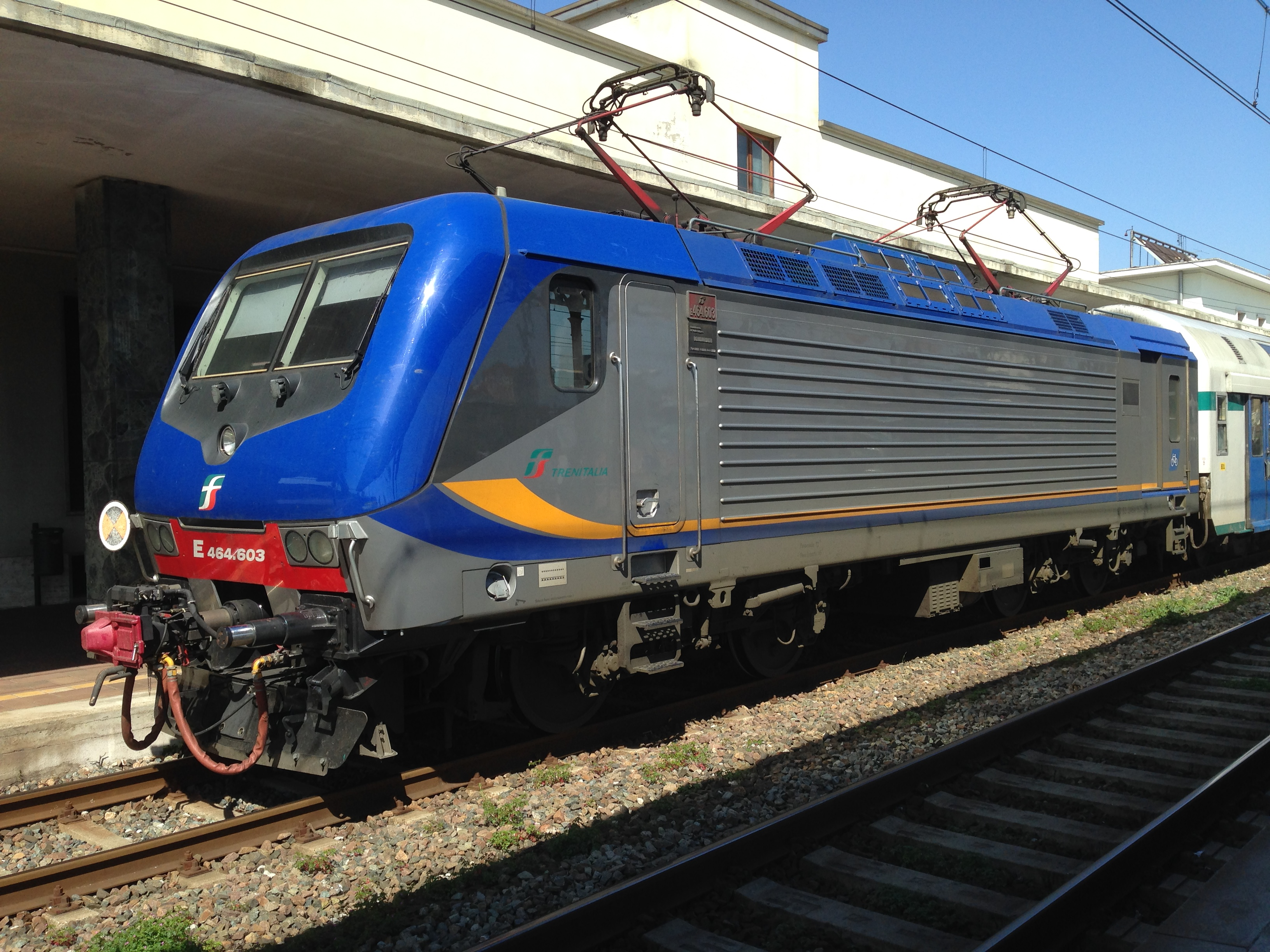
- An E.464 with the new livery
Type and origin
- Power type: Electric
- Builder: Bombardier
- Build date: 1999 - 2015
Specifications
- Configuration
  - UIC: Bo′Bo′
- Gauge: 1,435 mm (4 ft 8 1/2 in) standard gauge
- Wheel diameter: 1.25 m (49.21 in)
- Wheelbase: 7.54 m (24 ft 9 in) between bogies 2.65 m (104.33 in) between axles in each bogie
- Length: 15.75 m (51 ft 8 in)
- Width: 3.00 m (9 ft 10 in)
- Height: 4.10 m (13 ft 5 in)
- Loco weight: 72 t
- Electric system/s: 3,000 V DC
- Traction motors: Three-phase asynchronous
- Transmission: 27/55 and 26/64 gear ratios
Performance figures
- Maximum speed: 160 km/h (99 mph)
- Power output: 3.5 MW (4,700 hp)
- Tractive effort: 300 kN (67,000 lb_{f}) Starting; 135 kN (30,000 lb_{f}) Cont. @80 km/h (50 mph)
Career
- Operators: FS Trenitalia, TiLo, Ferrovie Emilia Romagna, Trenord
- Number in class: 728
- First run: 1999
- Disposition: 727 locos in service, 1 withdrawn

The E.464 is a class of Italian railways electric locomotives. They were introduced in the course of the 1990s for hauling light trains, especially for commuter service. They were acquired by FS Trenitalia to replace the old E.424 and E.646, dating from the 1940s and 1950s. The class was originally designed by ABB Trazione, later ADTranz (was part of the Bombardier group, which was acquired by Alstom in 2021), and produced in the Italian plant of Vado Ligure.

Cost per unit is 2.6 million Euro. With 717 locomotives currently in service (as of December 2015) the E.464 is the largest class in use by Trenitalia, and also the most numerous Italian locomotive class ever in service.

== History ==
The E.464 derives from a project launched by the Italian Ferrovie dello Stato in the 1980s for a "modular" class of locomotives which would be easily adapted to commuter, inter-regional and cargo services. Initially, types with 4-axle (Bo-Bo, E.453/E.454) and 6-axle (Bo-Bo-Bo, E.665/E.666) were devised, the latter for cargo services. However, the E.666 class was cancelled due to availability of the new E.652 Tigre class, capable of hauling massive cargo trains. Moreover, the new inverter technology was developed in those years, and the E.454 became suddenly obsolete.

In 1994 FS requested ABB to design a new class which, to save money, was to be based on already built prototypes and using parts from the new E.412 from the same producer. The first batch of 50 E.464 was issued to the Lazio regional government in 1999–2000, and proved immediately successful. Further orders for 90, 100 and 48 units followed in 2001–2005, plus another 100 in 2006–2007, another 100 in 2009, another 50 in 2011, and, finally, another order of 29 locomotives in November 2013: a total of 717 locomotives, and an investment of over one billion Euro.

After years of regional use, the 29th of August 2019 the first two units from a group of 70 were used to haul a long-distance Intercity train between Messina and Siracusa, in Sicily. Sicily is the first Italian region to get E464 for long-distances train, because in this region this locomotives have to replace the older ones of E656's class, but in the future E464 will be used to haul Intercity Night trains all around the country, because of their ability to reduce operating costs, thanks to the permanent use of 2 units together, creating a reversible train.

10 units are also used by Ferrovie Emilia Romagna and 1 by Trasporto Ferroviario Toscano for a total of 728 locomotives delivered in Italy.

== Technology ==
The E.464 were the first Italian locomotives provided with an automatic Scharfenberg coupling system, capable of forming trains rapidly. The hull is steel with aluminium ceiling, in the white-green standard livery of FS Trenitalia.

The locomotive uses simplified on-board electronics, with two GTO thyristor choppers which provide a variable voltage to the two inverters, that are used to feed the 4 three-phase asynchronous motors.

The motors employ a double-star type connection; if a traction inverter is inoperative (i.e. due to a failure) the motors use a delta-type connection and are fed by only one inverter. During braking the motors can be used as generators in order to recover electric energy (regenerative braking). However, since Italian railway power substations are not able to receive energy (they are not reversible), this method only works if there are other trains nearby absorbing current and the line voltage is lower than 4000 V. Otherwise the power is dissipated through a braking rheostat. The vehicle braking logic checks if these conditions are met and then decides to send the current to the line or to the rheostat.

Two static inverters (often referred to as BUR) output a voltage of 450 V, 60 Hz AC that feeds the auxiliary systems which include the compressors, 24 V battery charger, rheostat ventilation fans, motors fans etc.

Usually BUR n.1 feeds only the motor cooling devices with a voltage down to 352 V at 58 Hz, while BUR n.2 feeds the rest; in case of failure of one BUR, one of the three motor fans is deactivated automatically and the system is fed at 450 V 60 Hz by the remaining one.

Braking systems include, other than the regenerative/rheostat braking, disc-type brakes activated by compressed air to completely immobilize the locomotive when stationary. If this condition lasts for a prolonged time air may run out thereby releasing the brakes, in which case the spring brake is activated.

The coupling system allows, in case of emergency, coupling of up to 4 locomotives for hauling heavy trains, for a total of 14,000 kW (19,000 hp) (which is more than one TGV). The E.464 can be coupled with other modern types like the E.402.

The locomotive is provided with a secondary driving cabin with reduced instrumentation in the rear area, for short range manoeuvres in stations (maximum speed allowed: 30 km/h [19 mph]).

== Other users ==
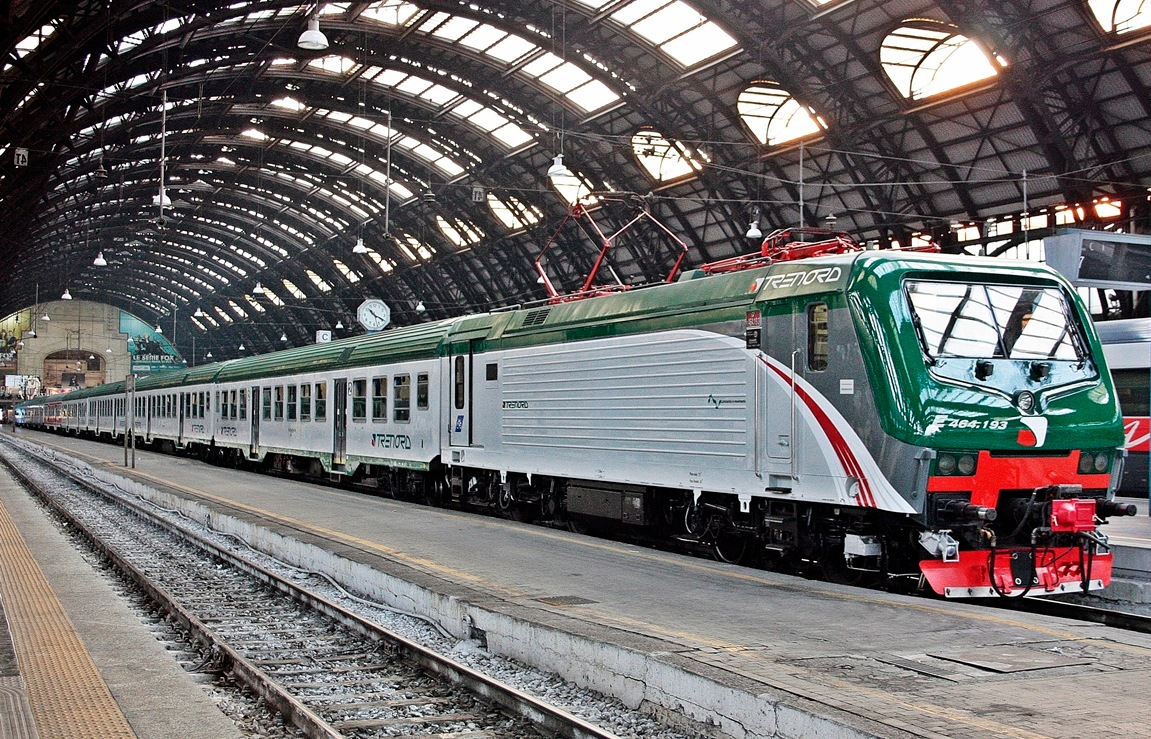
E.464 in Trenord livery at Milan's central station.

Bombardier has produced 60 units especially adapted for use with Vivalto two-floor coaches.

Apart from FS-Trenitalia (whose engines are often owned by regional authorities), E.464 is used in Lombardy by the regional railway company Trenord, and in Emilia-Romagna by the Ferrovie Emilia Romagna.

As of April 2018, there are 727 class E.464 locos. 717 are operated by Trenitalia; 716 in the series 464.001-464.717 (464.029 was withdrawn after accident damage sustained in September 2009), and 464.880, which was formerly operated by TFT. 10 locos (464.890-893 and 464.901-906) are operated by TPER (ex-FER).

== Accidents and incidents ==
- On 19 August 2020, a locomotive of the class (E464.192) was at the rear end of a train which ran away crewless from Paderno d'Adda and was derailed at Carnate-Usmate station. Three people were injured.

== Gallery ==
Selection of views

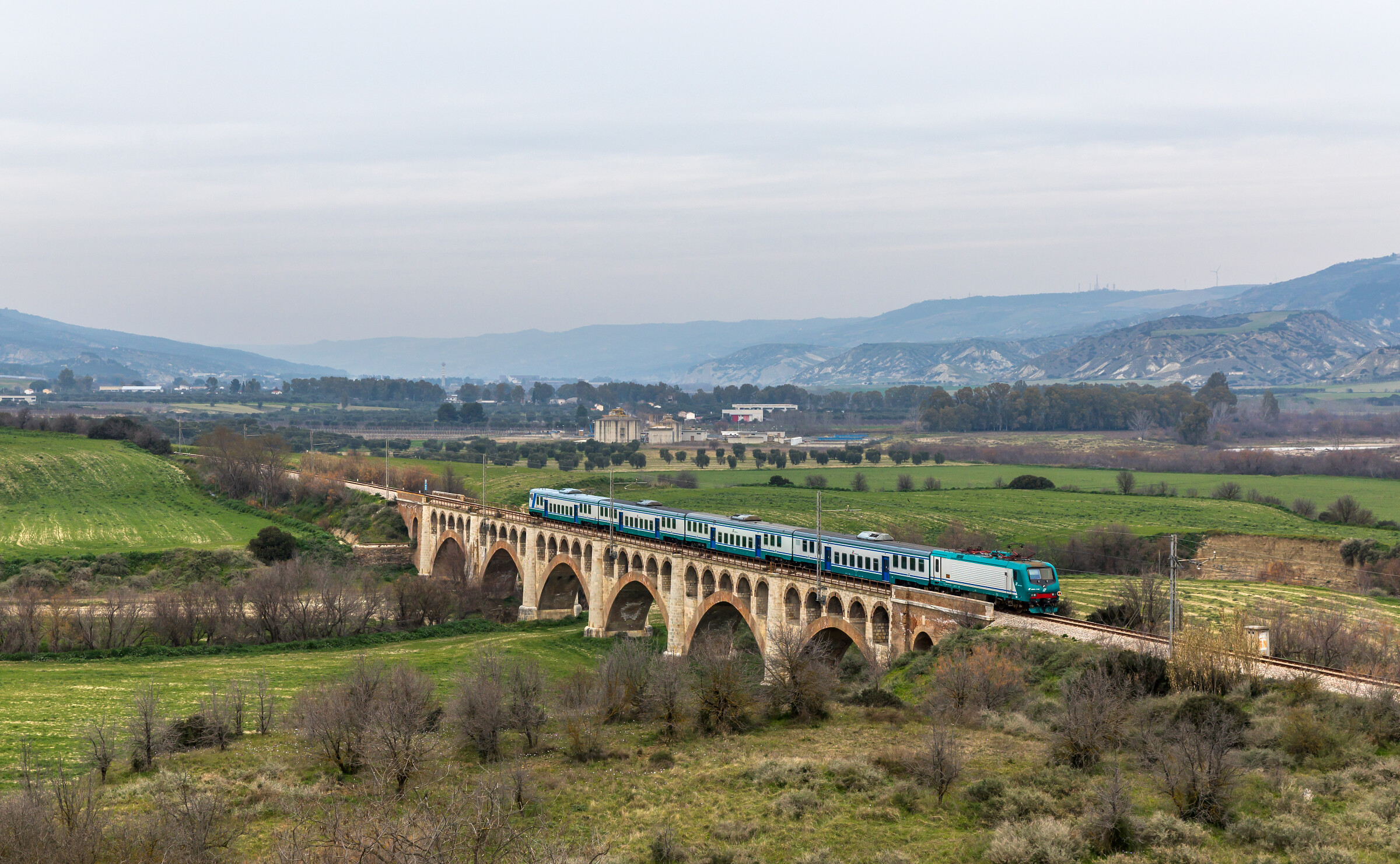

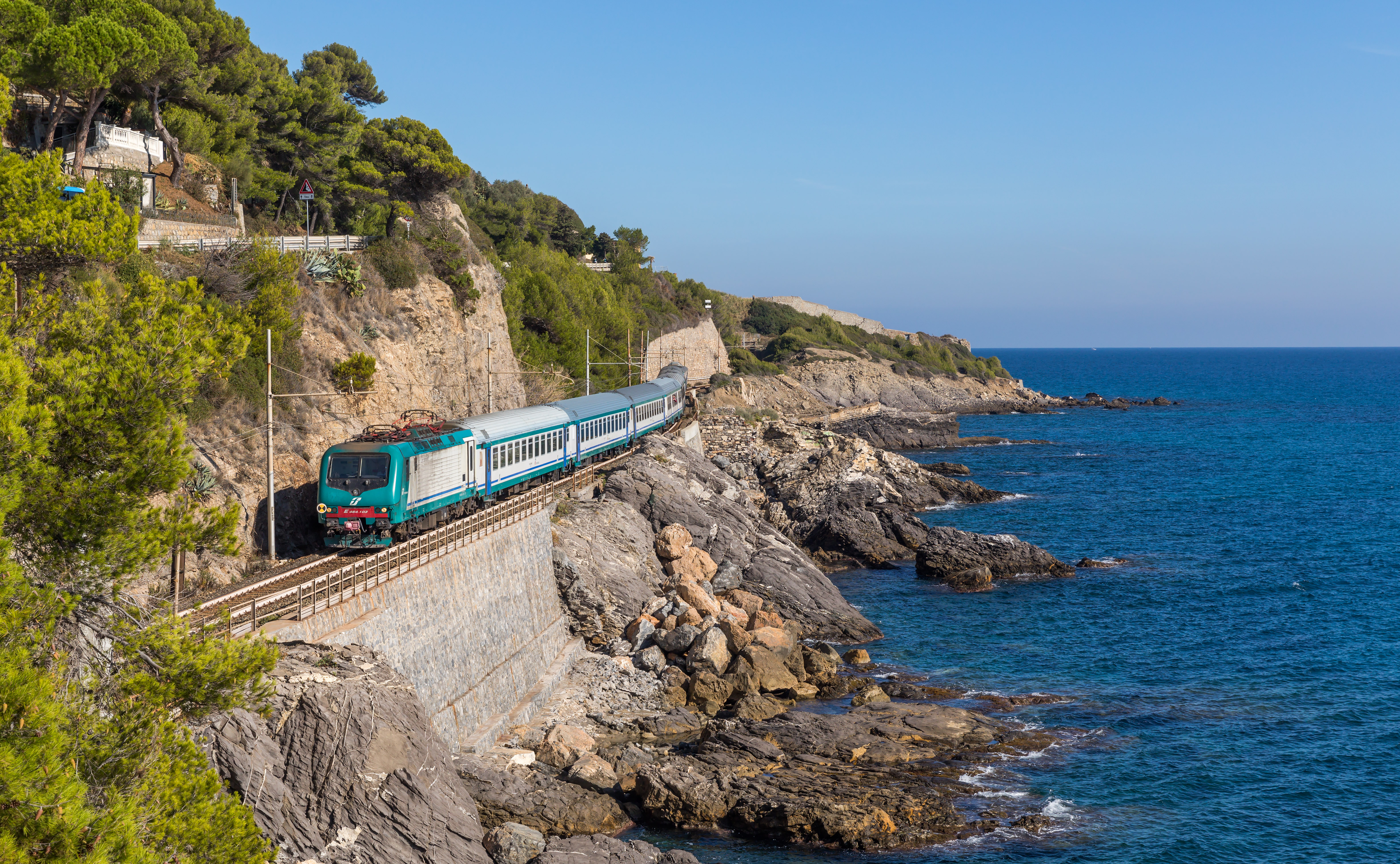

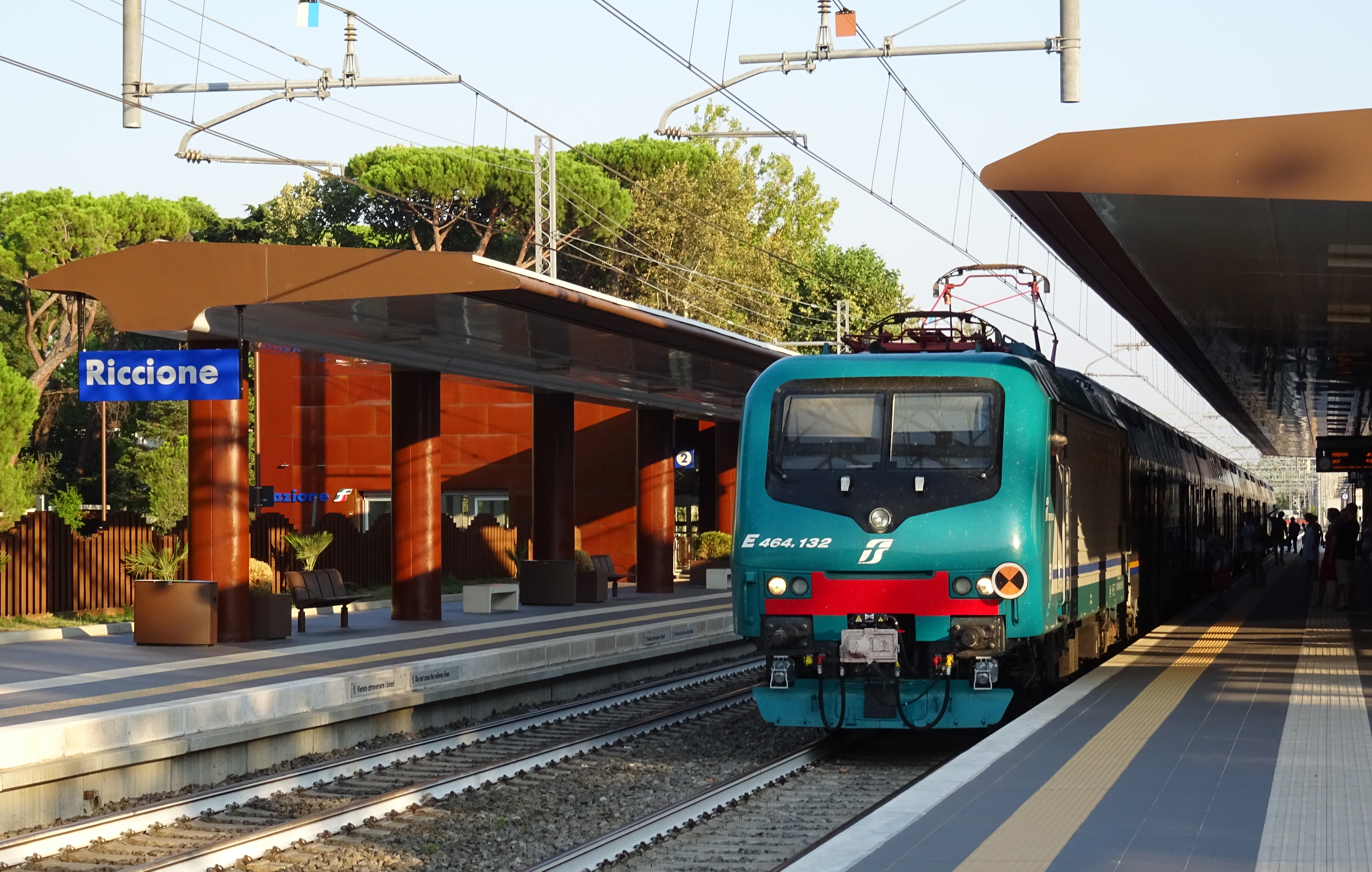

== Sources ==
- "80 anni di locomotive elettriche FS in CC". Tuttotreno Tema (21). Duegi. 2006.
- "E464". Tuttotreno. Duegi. July–August 2002.
