= FS Class 600 =

SFM Class 380 RA Class 380 FS Class 600
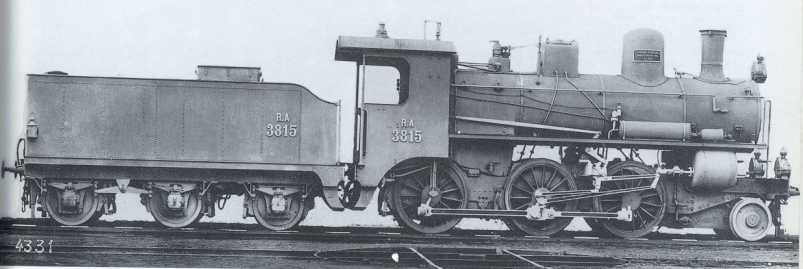
- RA 3815 locomotive, later FS locomotive 600.003
Type and origin
- Power type: Steam
- Builder: Gio. Ansaldo & C. (50), Berliner Maschinenbau (29), Officine Meccaniche (58), Wiener Neustädter Lokomotivfabrik (36), Henschel & Son (36), Maschinenfabrik Esslingen (9), Elsässische Maschinenbau-Gesellschaft Grafenstaden (9), MÁVAG (9), Sächsische Maschinenfabrik (12)
- Build date: 1904–1910
- Total produced: 248
Specifications
- Configuration
  - Whyte: 2-6-0
  - UIC: 1′C n2v
- Gauge: 1,435 mm (4 ft 8 1/2 in)
- Leading dia.: 840 mm (33.07 in)
- Driver dia.: 1,510 mm (59.45 in)
- Length: 9,607 mm (31 ft 6.2 in)
- Axle load: 14.4 tonnes (14.2 long tons; 15.9 short tons)
- Loco weight: 54 tonnes (53 long tons; 60 short tons)
- Tender weight: 31.9 tonnes (31.4 long tons; 35.2 short tons)
- Fuel type: Coal
- Fuel capacity: 6,000 kg (13,000 lb)
- Water cap.: 12,000 L (2,600 imp gal; 3,200 US gal)
- Firebox
  - Grate area: 2.3 m^{2} (25 sq ft)
- Boiler pressure: 14 kg/cm^{2} (1.37 MPa; 199 psi)
- Heating surface: 153.29 m^{2} (1,650.0 sq ft)
- Cylinders: Two, inside
- High-pressure cylinder: Series 1: 430 mm × 700 mm (16.93 in × 27.56 in); Series 2: 410 mm × 700 mm (16.14 in × 27.56 in)
- Low-pressure cylinder: Series 1: 610 mm × 700 mm (24.02 in × 27.56 in); Series 2: 650 mm × 700 mm (25.59 in × 27.56 in)
- Valve gear: Walschaerts
- Valve type: Piston valves, outside
Performance figures
- Maximum speed: 80 km/h (50 mph)
- Power output: 660–730 CV (485–537 kW; 651–720 hp)
- Tractive effort: 6,870 kgf (67.4 kN; 15,100 lbf)

The Ferrovie dello Stato Italiane (FS; Italian State Railways) Class 600 (Italian: Gruppo 600), formerly Rete Adriatica Class 380 and Società per le Strade Ferrate Meridionali Class 380, is a 2-6-0 'Mogul' steam locomotive; it is considered by some as the first Italian modern steam locomotive.

== Design and construction ==
Designed in Florence for the Rete Adriatica by engineers such as Enrico Plancher and Giuseppe Zara, the Class 600 was meant to pull both passenger and freight trains on the steep and curvy Italian lines at a reasonable speed. It introduced several novelties in Italian locomotive practice, the most notable of which is undoubtedly the Italian bogie: a derivation of the German Krauss-Helmholtz bogie, it was meant to ensure good performance in curves without requiring a four-wheel bogie; it proved very successful, and it would become a staple of Italian steam locomotives.

Another notable feature was the application of the Walschaerts valve gear on a locomotive with internal cylinders but outside piston valves, coupled with a compound engine. The arrangement would return on other locomotive classes such as the Class 630 and the Class 745.

The first 50 locomotives were built with a boiler that allowed for a power output of 660 hp (490 kW); the remaining locomotives were built with bigger boilers (also refitted to some of the earlier locomotives over the years) that gave them a higher value of 730 hp (540 kW).

Some of the first locomotives were numbered under the RA and the SFM (Strade Ferrate Meridionali) ownership, until they were absorbed by the Ferrovie dello Stato respectively in 1905 and 1906; two more, built for the Valsugana valley railway, were taken over by the FS in 1912. In all, 248 locomotives were built between 1904 and 1908. All were fitted with a standard six-wheeled tender.

== Service and conversions ==
The Class 600 proved very successful in service, and paved the way for their simple-expansion and superheated derivatives of the Class 625.

In 1927, the 600.168 was rebuilt with a superheated 625 boiler, and was reclassified as 601.168. However, the experiment was not followed on, and it was preferred, starting from 1929, to outright convert the locomotives to Class 625 status. In all, 153 locomotives were converted to 625.3XX until 1933.

The remaining unrebuilt Class 600 locomotives were gradually withdrawn before 1940.
