= FS Class 745 =

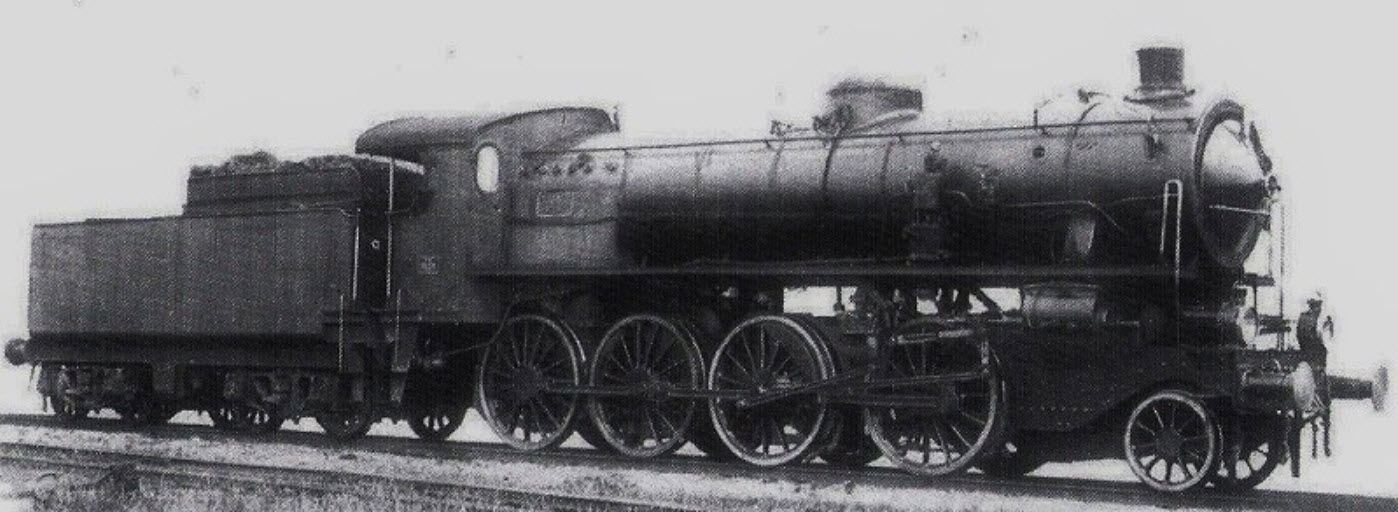
Type and origin
- Power type: Steam
- Builder: Ernesto Breda (23), Gio. Ansaldo & C. (50)
- Build date: 1914–1923
- Total produced: 73
Specifications
- Configuration
  - Whyte: 2-8-0
  - UIC: 1′D h2
- Gauge: 1,435 mm (4 ft 8 1/2 in) standard gauge
- Leading dia.: 960 mm (3 ft 1 3/4 in)
- Driver dia.: 1,630 mm (5 ft 4 1/8 in)
- Length: 11,615 mm (38 ft 1 1/4 in)
- Axle load: 14.4 tonnes (14.2 long tons; 15.9 short tons)
- Loco weight: 68.5 tonnes (67.4 long tons; 75.5 short tons)
- Tender weight: 45.6 tonnes (44.9 long tons; 50.3 short tons)
- Fuel type: Coal
- Fuel capacity: 6,000 kg (13,000 lb)
- Water cap.: 18,000 litres (4,000 imp gal; 4,800 US gal)
- Firebox
  - Grate area: 3.5 m^{2} (38 sq ft)
- Boiler pressure: 12 kg/cm^{2} (11.8 bar; 171 psi)
- Heating surface: 191.7 m^{2} (2,063 sq ft)
- Superheater
  - Heating area: 50.5 m^{2} (544 sq ft)
- Cylinders: Two, simple
- Cylinder size: 600 mm × 720 mm (23 5/8 in × 28 3/8 in)
- Valve gear: Walschaerts
Performance figures
- Maximum speed: 75 km/h (47 mph)
- Power output: 1,250 CV (919 kW; 1,230 hp) at 55 km/h (34 mph)
- Tractive effort: 14,500 kgf (142 kN; 32,000 lbf)

The Ferrovie dello Stato (FS; Italian State Railways) Class 745 was a class of 2-8-0 'Consolidation' steam locomotives.

== Design and construction ==
The Class 745 was designed to meet the need for a low axle-load locomotive capable of providing adequate motive power on the Salerno–Reggio di Calabria railway, a curvy line with some severe inclines, whose importance had increased with the Italo-Turkish War of 1911-2, but whose antiquated infrastructures tolerated only a 14.4 t axle load. Locomotives such as the 2-6-0 Class 600 and Class 625 then used were struggling with the increasing loads even when double heading; the 2-8-0 Class 730 and Class 740 would have had the required tractive effort and moderate axle load, but had a limited top speed, while faster locomotives such as the 2-6-2 Class 680 and Class 685 had an excessive axle load, and not enough tractive effort. Therefore, the design effort focused on a 2-8-0 locomotive with larger driving wheels and a relatively large boiler.

The Class 745 sported 1,630 mm (64.17 in) driving wheels, the same as the Class 625, as well as the Italian bogie; from those, it also borrowed the peculiar engine layout, with two inside cylinders with outside steam chests and valve gear, to keep the weight down. However, this arrangement ended up being the Achilles' heel of the locomotive, as the cramped arrangement (with the driving rod linked to the second coupled axle, being therefore rather short) causing the bearings to often run hot. The tender provided was the standard FS bogie tender, but to avoid problems with the lightweight bridges on the line they would serve the water capacity was reduced to 18,000 litres (4,000 imp gal; 4,800 US gal); in the following years, as the line's infrastructure was improved, the capacity would be raised to the standard 22,000 litres (4,800 imp gal; 5,800 US gal).

The first batch of twelve locomotives was outshopped by Gio. Ansaldo & C. and Ernesto Breda between 1913 and 1914; another 36 locomotives would be built by Ansaldo in 1919, while a final 25 locomotives were built between 1922 and 1923 by the two firms, with the latter batch having left-handed drive as opposed to the previous right-hand drive.

== Operational history ==
The Class 745 helped obviate the need for motive power on the Tyrrhenian railway, especially on the 1-in-43.5 incline between Agropoli and Vallo della Lucania, as well as on the Reggio Calabria-Taranto line, although with time the increased loads on the former eventually forced to resort to double-heading for the heaviest trains; for this reason, the FS electrified the line in 1935. The Class 745 was transferred in sheds such as Ancona, Naples and Udine; the last ones were assigned to Padua till the mid-1960s, when they were scrapped. None survived into preservation.

== Bibliography ==
- Cornolò, Giovanni (July 2014). "Locomotive a vapore". TuttoTreno (3).
- Kalla-Bishop, P. M. (1986). Italian State Railways Steam Locomotives. Abingdon: Tourret Publishing. pp. 74–75. ISBN 0-905878-03-5.
