= FS Class 640 II =

FS Class 640
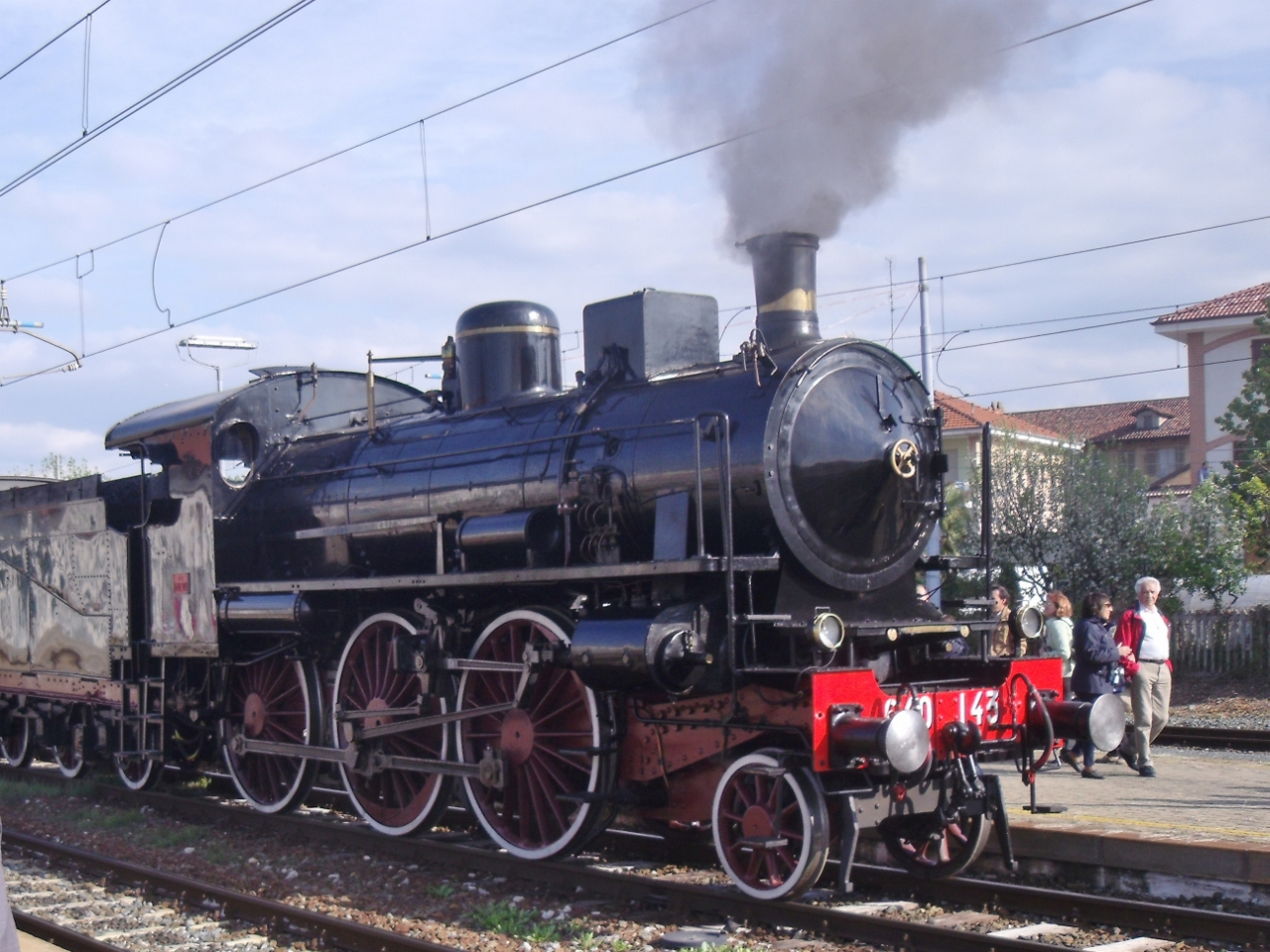
- FS locomotive 640.143 in 2012
Type and origin
- Power type: Steam
- Builder: Berliner Maschinenbau (48), Ernesto Breda, (103); Costruzioni Meccaniche di Saronno (18), Gio. Ansaldo & C.
- Build date: 1907-1911
- Total produced: 173
Specifications
- Configuration
  - UIC: 1′C h2
- Gauge: 1,435 mm (4 ft 8 1/2 in) standard gauge
- Leading dia.: 960 mm (37.80 in)
- Driver dia.: 1,850 mm (72.83 in)
- Length: 9,670 mm (31 ft 8 3/4 in)
- Axle load: 14.7 t (14.5 long tons; 16.2 short tons)
- Loco weight: 54.5 t (53.6 long tons; 60.1 short tons)
- Tender weight: 35.3 t (34.7 long tons; 38.9 short tons)
- Total weight: 89,8 tons
- Fuel type: Coal
- Fuel capacity: 6,000 kg (13,000 lb)
- Water cap.: 15,000 L (3,300 imp gal; 4,000 US gal)
- Firebox
  - Grate area: 2.42 m^{2} (26.0 sq ft)
- Boiler pressure: 12 kg/cm^{2} (1.18 MPa; 171 psi)
- Heating surface: 108.5 m^{2} (1,168 sq ft)
- Superheater
  - Heating area: 33.5 m^{2} (361 sq ft)
- Cylinders: Two
- Cylinder size: 540 mm × 700 mm (21.26 in × 27.56 in)
- Valve gear: Walschaerts, Caprotti
Performance figures
- Maximum speed: 100 km/h (62 mph)
- Power output: 800 CV (588 kW; 789 hp)
- Tractive effort: 10,000 kgf (98.1 kN; 22,000 lbf)
Career
- Preserved: 15 rebuilt (from FS Class 630)

The Ferrovie dello Stato (FS; Italian State Railways) Class 640 (Italian: Gruppo 640) is a class of 2-6-0 'Mogul' steam locomotives in Italy. Commonly nicknamed "Signorine" (Italian: 'young ladies'), a nickname shared with the similar Class 625, these locomotives were the first superheated steam locomotives in Italy.

== Design and construction ==
When the FS were created in 1905, Chief Mechanical Engineer Giuseppe Zara undertook a process to design a standard range of locomotives; one of these was the Class 630, a light express engine which, together with the other designs, shared the features of being compound locomotives. However, with the diffusion in Germany (then in close ties with Italy because of the Triple Alliance) of the Schmidt superheater, a decision to build there a batch of 24 non-compound and superheated versions of the Class 630 (keeping all the other features, including the Italian bogie and the peculiar inside-cylinders/outside valve chests and valve gear) was taken. Results were highly successful, and subsequently almost all steam locomotives in Italy would be built with simple expansion and superheating.

The first locomotives were built by the German firm Schwartzkopff (as the Italian industry lacked experience with the superheating technology), with other Italian firms building the rest, for a total of 169; four more Class 640 were added in 1951 when the railway company for which they had been built for (Strade Ferrate di Biella) was incorporated in the FS.

All the Class 640 were fitted with a unique three-axle tender with a water capacity of 15,000 L (4,000 US gal)

== Operations ==
Originally pulling the principal express trains on the Italian mainlines, after a few years the Class 640 locomotives were replaced in these services by the more powerful Class 680 and Class 685 2-6-2 locomotives; they were then assigned to pulling passenger trains on secondary lines with level ground. They enjoyed a very long career, surviving up to the end of regular Italian steam services in the 1970s.

== Modifications ==
Between 1929 and 1931, fifteen Class 630 locomotives were rebuilt with superheaters, simple expansion and Caprotti valve gears. Their running numbers had 300 added to them, making them form the 640.3XX subclass.

== Preservation ==
Sixteen Class 640 locomotives survive into preservation; of these, two (the 143 and 091) are currently operational and available for heritage trains, while others are being restored.
