= Bogie =

Chassis for wheels and suspension under vehicles

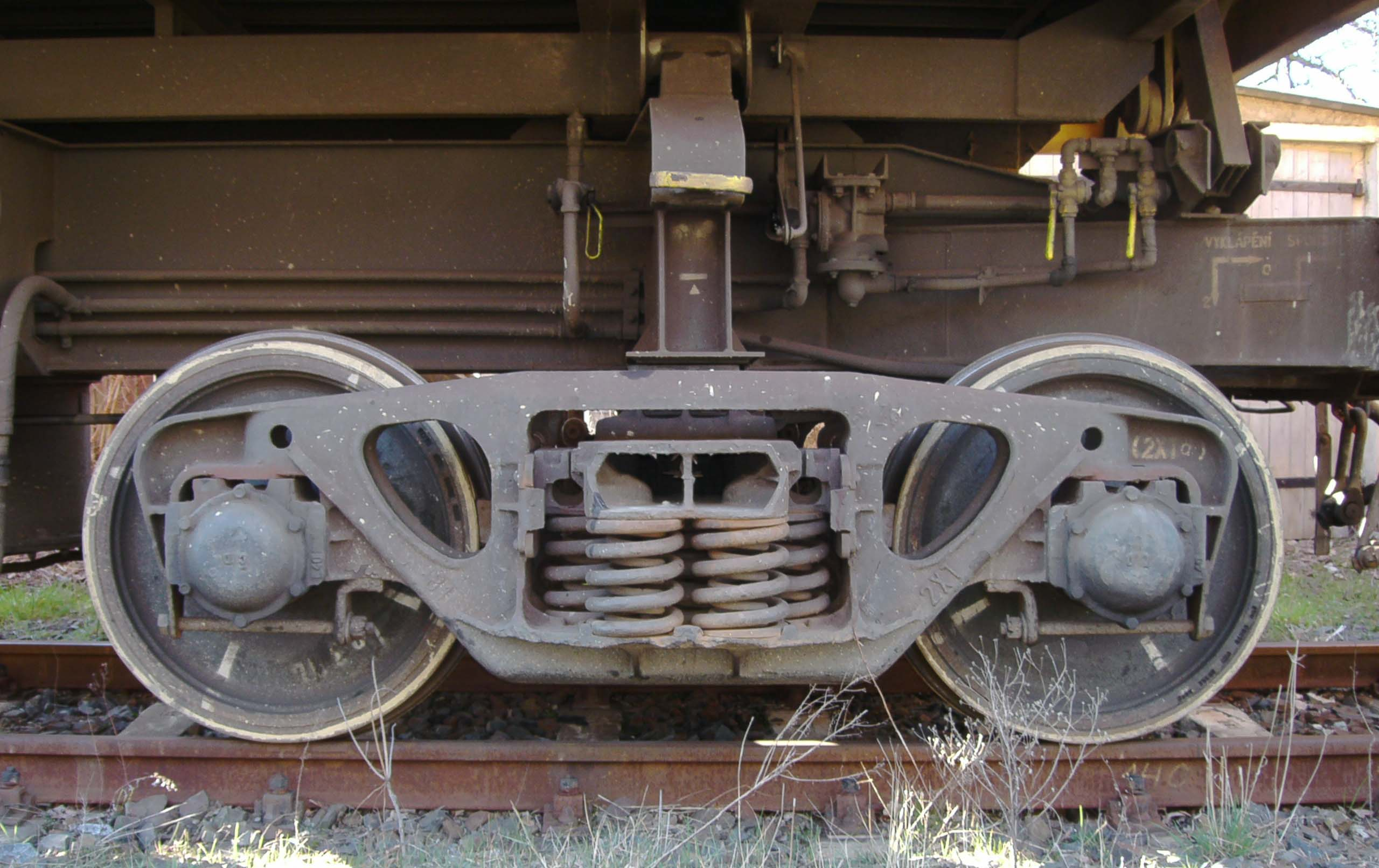
Bogie on a Czech Railways side-tipper car

A bogie (/ˈboʊɡi/ BOH-ghee; or truck in North American English) comprises two or more wheelsets (two wheels on an axle), in a frame, attached under a vehicle by a pivot. Bogies take various forms in various modes of transport. A bogie may remain normally attached (as on many railroad cars and semi-trailers) or be quickly detachable (as for a dolly in a road train or in railway bogie exchange). It may include suspension components within it (as most rail and trucking bogies do), or be solid and, in turn, be suspended (as are most bogies of tracked vehicles). It may be mounted on a swivel, as traditionally on a railway carriage or locomotive, additionally jointed and sprung (as in the landing gear of an airliner), or held in place by other means (centreless bogies).

Although bogie is the preferred spelling and first-listed variant in various dictionaries, bogey and bogy are also used.

== Railway ==
A bogie in the UK, or a railroad truck, wheel truck, or truck in North America, is a structure underneath a railway vehicle (wagon, coach, or locomotive) to which axles (hence, wheels) are attached through bearings. In Indian English, bogie may also refer to an entire railway carriage. In South Africa, the term bogie is often alternatively used to refer to a freight or goods wagon (shortened from bogie wagon).

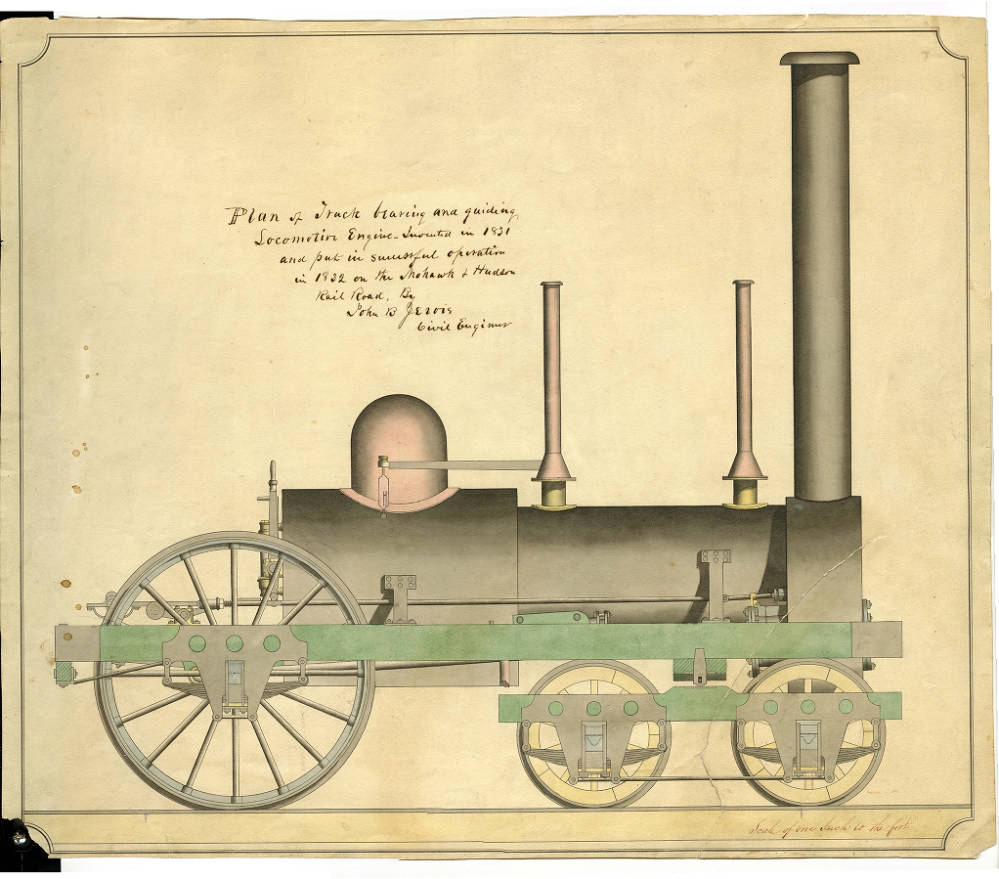
Experiment, the first successful American locomotive with a bogie, built in 1831 to a design by civil engineer John B. Jervis

The bogie was independently invented in the UK and the USA to address different problems. The first locomotive with a bogie was built by UK engineer William Chapman in 1812. However, there was no great demand because railroads in the UK at the time tended to be very straight, which British engineers saw as the most efficient way to get between two points. In the USA, the terrain was more challenging, and curved lines were a necessity. The bogie was first used in America for horse-drawn wagons on the Quincy Granite Railroad in 1829. The first successful locomotive with a bogie to guide the locomotive into curves while also supporting the smokebox was built by John B. Jervis in 1831. In 1834, the American Ross Winans independently patented a bogie configuration for the rail car (passenger or cargo), allowing cars that had no practical limit in length, since he had two bogies, each with two axles, each mounted at opposite ends of the car, on a swivel attached to the undercarriage. This led to a whole new form of rail car that, like those of which are recognizable today, are long cars, not the short stagecoach cars (example) which were initially required to keep the distance between axles short. These long cars carry more weight because the eight wheels distribute the load, smooth out the ride due to the independent suspension, and reduce friction on curves. The B&O railroad, with which Winans contracted, was the first to adopt bogie rail cars in the 1830s. It took a while for the "American" style car to catch on in England. The first use of bogie coaches in Britain was in 1872 by the Festiniog Railway. The first standard-gauge British railway to build coaches with bogies, instead of rigidly mounted axles, was the Midland Railway in 1874.

=== Purpose ===
Bogies allow the wheelsets to more closely follow the direction of the rails when travelling around a curve in the railroad.

Displacements of a bogie

Bogies serve a number of purposes:

- supporting the body of the rail vehicle
- running stably on both straight and curved tracks
- improving ride quality by absorbing vibration and minimizing the impact of centrifugal forces when the train runs on curves at high speed
- minimizing generation of track irregularities and rail abrasion.

Instability can occur when a combination of bogie design, springing, vehicle and bogie wheelbase, and track dynamics, causes the bogie to oscillate at high speed – a phenomenon known as "hunting". If unchecked, derailment can occur. Cars exhibiting hunting are removed immediately upon discovery of the defect. A tendency for more than one vehicle to hunt will result in investigations with a view to re-designing.

Usually, two bogies are fitted to each carriage, wagon or locomotive, one at each end. Another configuration is often used in articulated vehicles, in which the bogies (often Jacobs bogies) are placed under the connection between the carriages or wagons.

Most bogies have two axles, but some cars designed for superior riding qualities or heavy loads have more axles per bogie. Heavy-duty cars may have more than two bogies using span bolsters to equalize the load and connect the bogies to the cars.

Usually, the train floor is at a level above the bogies, but the floor of the area between the bogies may be lowered to increase interior space while staying within height restrictions. Examples are container well cars, bi-level passenger cars, or stepless-entry, low-floor cars on railways with near-ground-level platforms.

=== Components ===
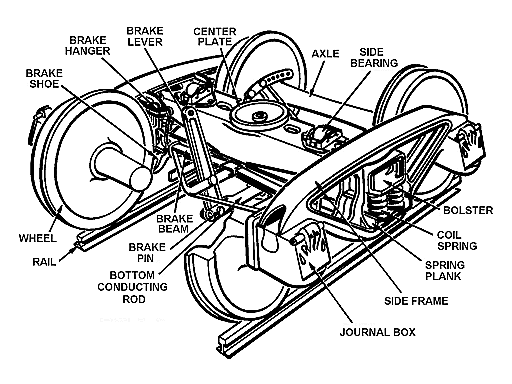
A diagram of an American-style truck showing the names of its parts and showing the journal boxes to be integral parts of the side frame. The journal boxes house plain bearings.

Key components of a bogie include:

- The bogie frame: This can be of inside frame type, where the main frame and bearings are between the wheels, or (more commonly) of outside frame type, where the main frame and bearings are outside the wheels.
- Suspension to absorb shocks between the bogie frame and the rail vehicle body. Common types are coil springs, leaf springs and rubber airbags.
- At least one wheelset, composed of an axle with bearings and a wheel at each end.
- The bolster, the main crossmember, is connected to the bogie frame through the secondary suspension. The railway car is supported at the pivot point on the bolster.
- Axle box suspensions absorb shocks between the axle bearings and the bogie frame. The axle box suspension usually consists of a spring between the bogie frame and axle bearings to permit up-and-down movement, and sliders to prevent lateral movement. A more modern design uses solid rubber springs.
- Brake equipment: Two main types are used: brake shoes that are pressed against the tread of the wheel, and disc brakes and pads.
- In powered vehicles, some form of transmission, usually electrically powered traction motors with a single speed gearbox or a hydraulically powered torque converter.

The bogie's connections to the rail vehicle allow a certain degree of rotation about a vertical-axis pivot (bolster), with side bearers preventing excessive movement. More modern, bolsterless bogie designs omit these features, instead taking advantage of the sideways movement of the suspension to permit rotational movement.

==== Locomotives ====
===== Diesel and electric =====
Modern diesel and electric locomotives are mounted on bogies. Those commonly used in North America include Type A, Blomberg, HT-C, and Flexicoil trucks.

===== Steam =====
On a steam locomotive, the leading and trailing wheels may be mounted on bogies like Bissel trucks (also known as pony trucks). Articulated locomotives (e.g., Fairlie, Garratt or Mallet locomotives) have power bogies similar to those on diesel and electric locomotives.

==== Rollbock ====
A rollbock is a specialized type of bogie that is inserted under the wheels of a rail wagon/car, usually to convert to another track gauge. Transporter wagons apply the same concept at the level of a flatcar specialized to carry other cars as its load.

==== Archbar bogies ====
In archbar or diamond frame bogies, the side frames are fabricated rather than cast.

Archbar bogie pool

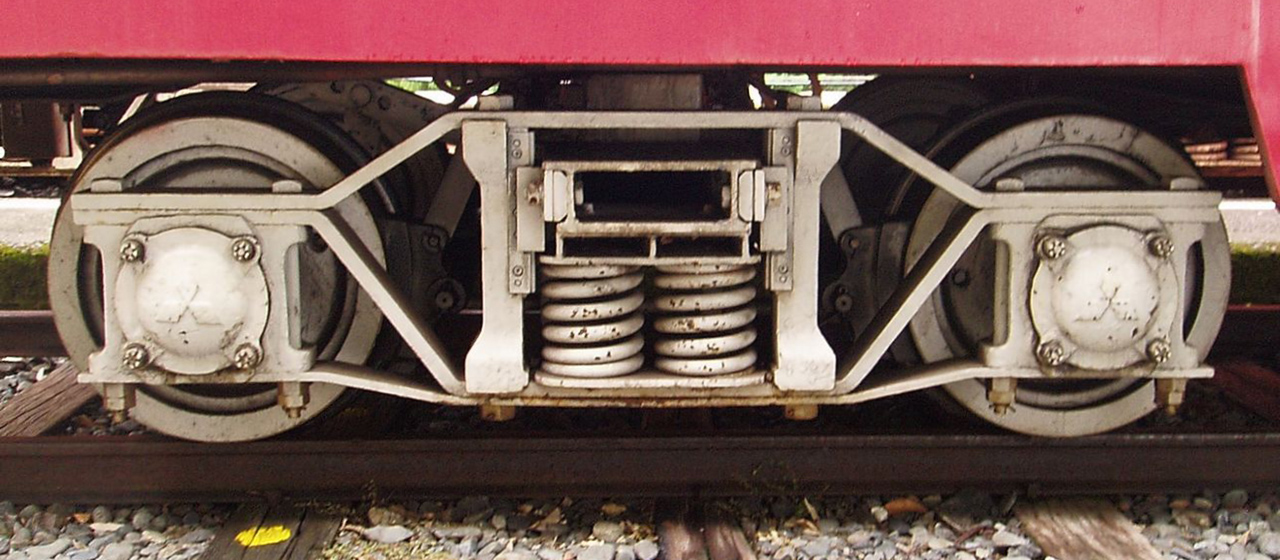
Japanese archbar bogie with axleboxes

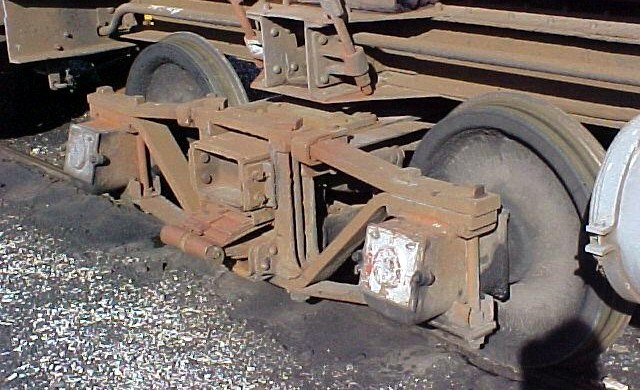
Diamond frame bogie, elliptical springs and American style journal boxes

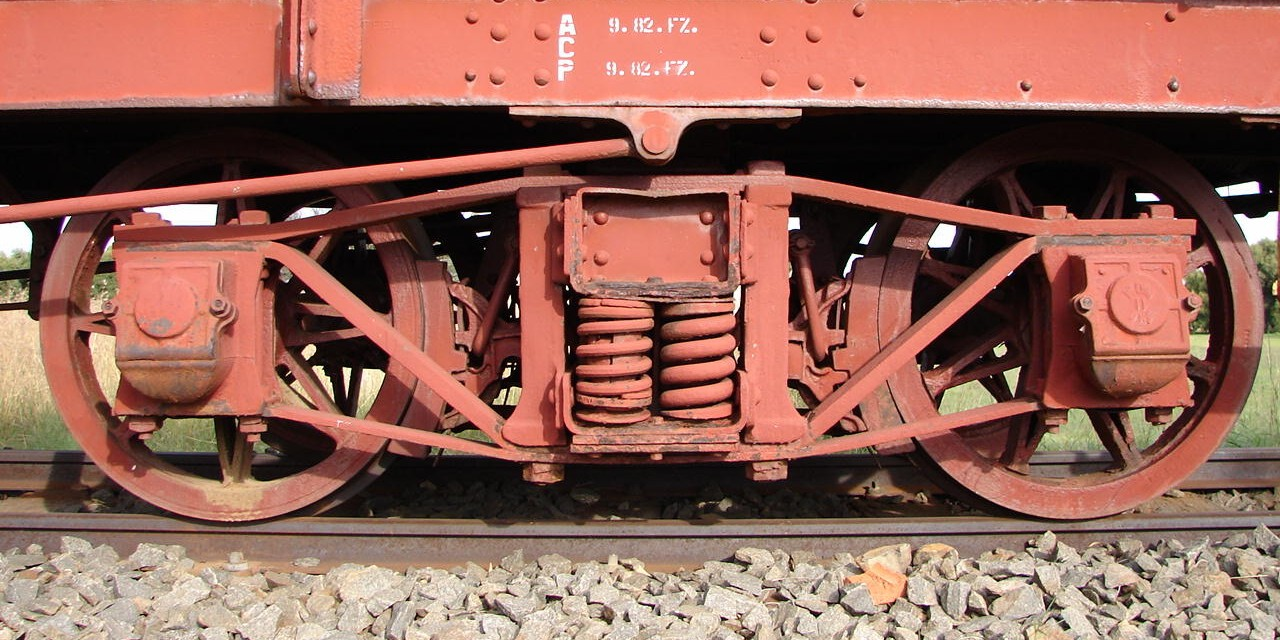
Diamond frame bogie, coil springs and journal boxes

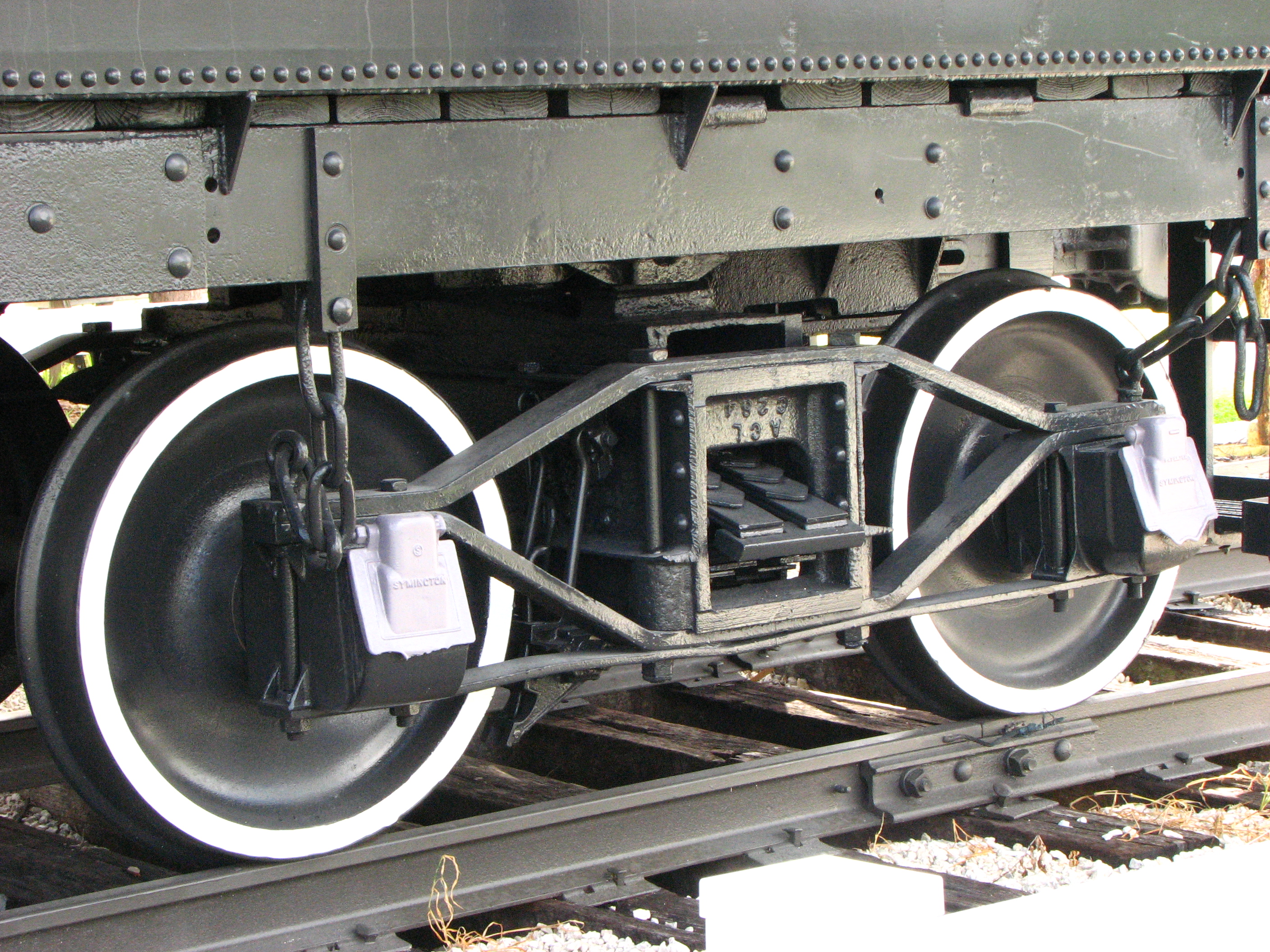
Archbar bogie with journal bearings in American-style journal boxes, as used on some steam locomotive tenders. Archbar bogies (trucks) were also used on freight cars.

=== Tramway ===
==== Modern ====
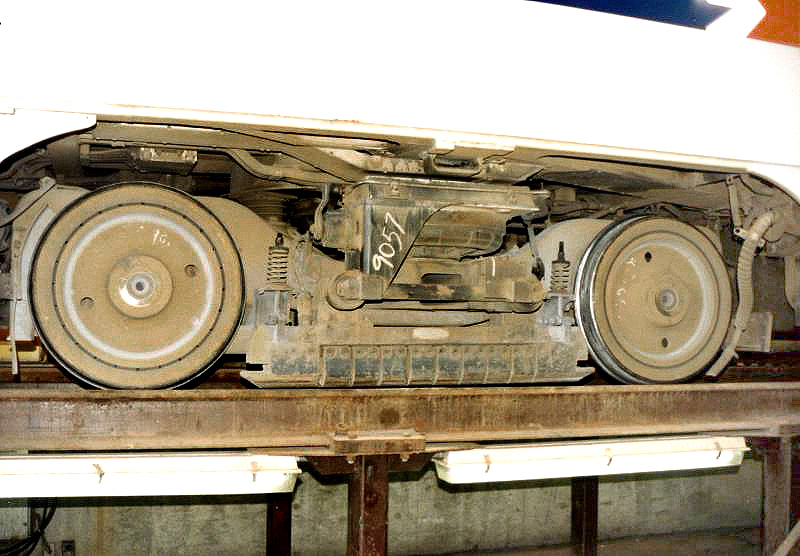
Side view of a SEPTA K-Car bogie

Tram bogies are much simpler in design because of their axle load, and the tighter curves found on tramways mean tram bogies seldom have more than two axles. Furthermore, some tramways have steeper gradients and vertical as well as horizontal curves, which means tram bogies often need to pivot on the horizontal axis, as well.

Some articulated trams have bogies located under the articulations, a setup known as a Jacobs bogie. Often, low-floor trams are fitted with nonpivoting bogies; many tramway enthusiasts see this as a retrograde step, as it leads to greater wear on both track and wheels and significantly reduces the speed at which a tram can round a curve.

==== Historic ====
In the past, many different types of bogies (trucks) have been used under tramcars (e.g., Brill, Peckham, maximum traction). A maximum traction truck has one driving axle with large wheels and one non-driving axle with smaller wheels. The bogie pivot is located off-centre, so more than half the weight rests on the driving axle.

=== Hybrid systems ===
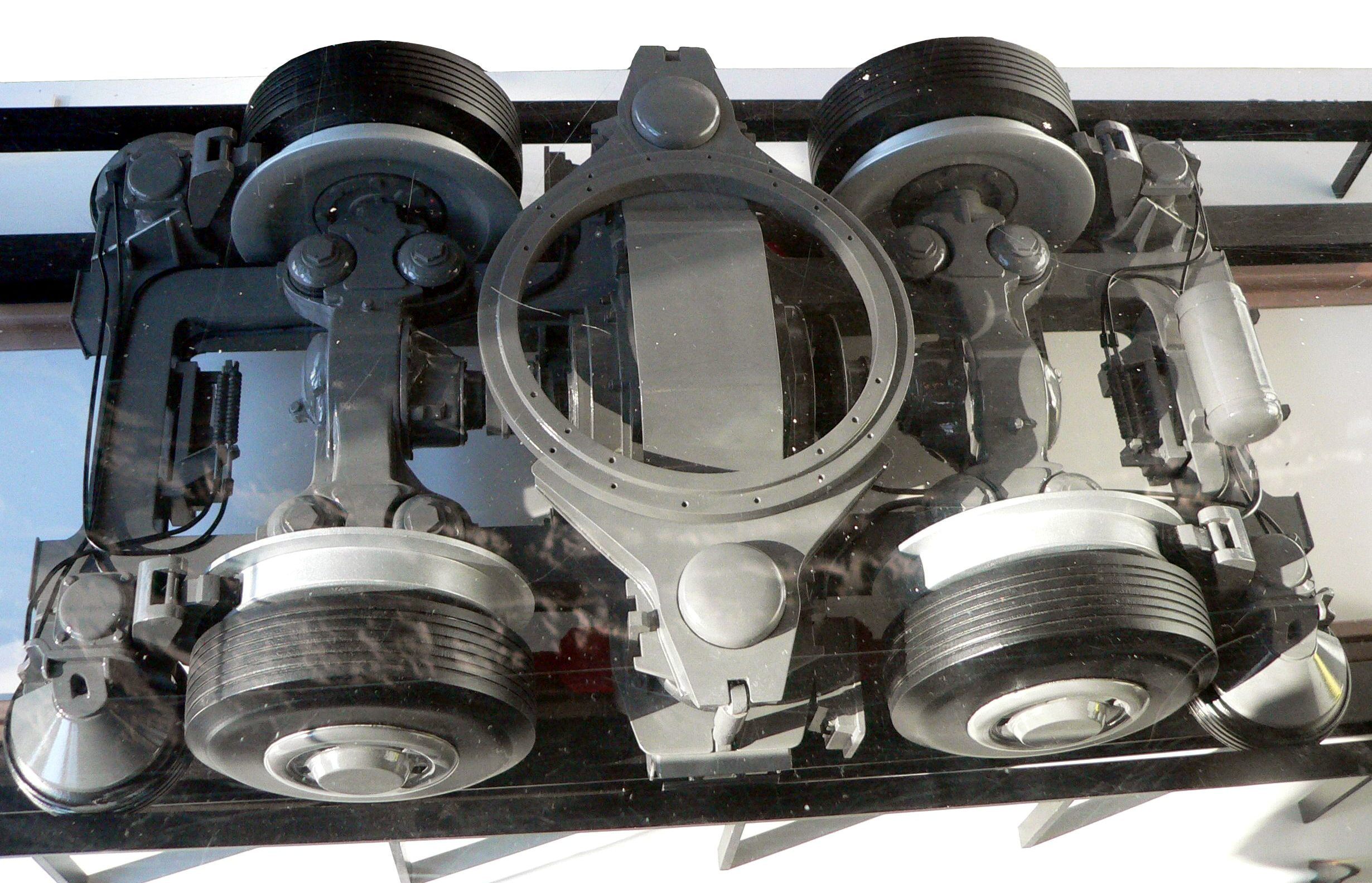
Mockup of the pneumatic bogie system of an MP 89 carriage used on the Meteor metro, showing the two special wheelsets

The retractable stadium roof on Toronto's Rogers Centre used modified off-the-shelf train bogies on a circular rail. The system was chosen for its proven reliability.

Rubber-tyred metro trains use a specialised version of railway bogies. Special flanged steel wheels are behind the rubber-tired running wheels, with additional horizontal guide wheels in front and behind them. The unusually large flanges on the steel wheels guide the bogie through standard railroad switches, and in addition keep the train from derailing in case the tires deflate.

=== Variable gauge axles ===
To overcome breaks of gauge, some bogies are being fitted with variable gauge axles (VGA) so that they can operate on two different gauges. These include the SUW 2000 system from ZNTK Poznań.

== Radial steering truck ==
Radial-steering trucks, also known as radial bogies, allow the individual axles to align with curves in addition to the bogie frame pivoting as a whole. For non-radial bogies, the more axles in the assembly, the more difficulty it has negotiating curves, due to wheel flange to rail friction. For radial bogies, the wheelsets actively steer through curves, thereby reducing wear at the wheel's flange-to-rail interface and improving adhesion.

In the US, radial steering has been implemented in EMD and GE locomotives. The EMD version, designated HTCR, was made standard equipment for the SD70 series, first sold in 1993. The HTCR in operation had mixed results and relatively high purchase and maintenance costs. EMD subsequently introduced the HTSC truck, essentially the HTCR stripped of radial components. GE introduced their version in 1995 as a buyer option for the AC4400CW and later Evolution Series locomotives. However, it also met with limited acceptance because of its relatively high purchase and maintenance costs, and customers have generally chosen GE Hi-Ad standard trucks for newer and rebuilt locomotives.

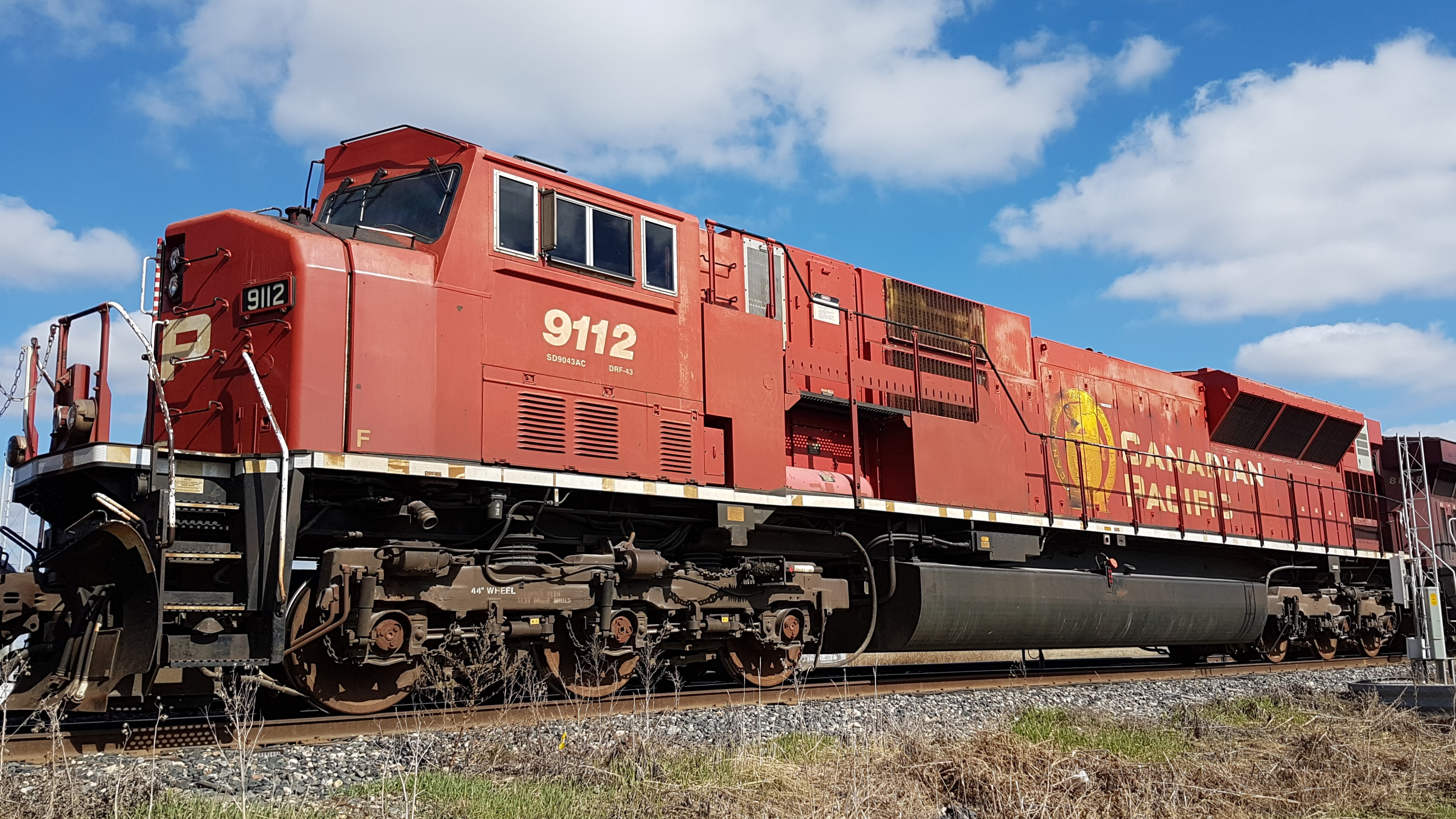
EMD HTCR radial steering trucks on an EMD SD9043MAC

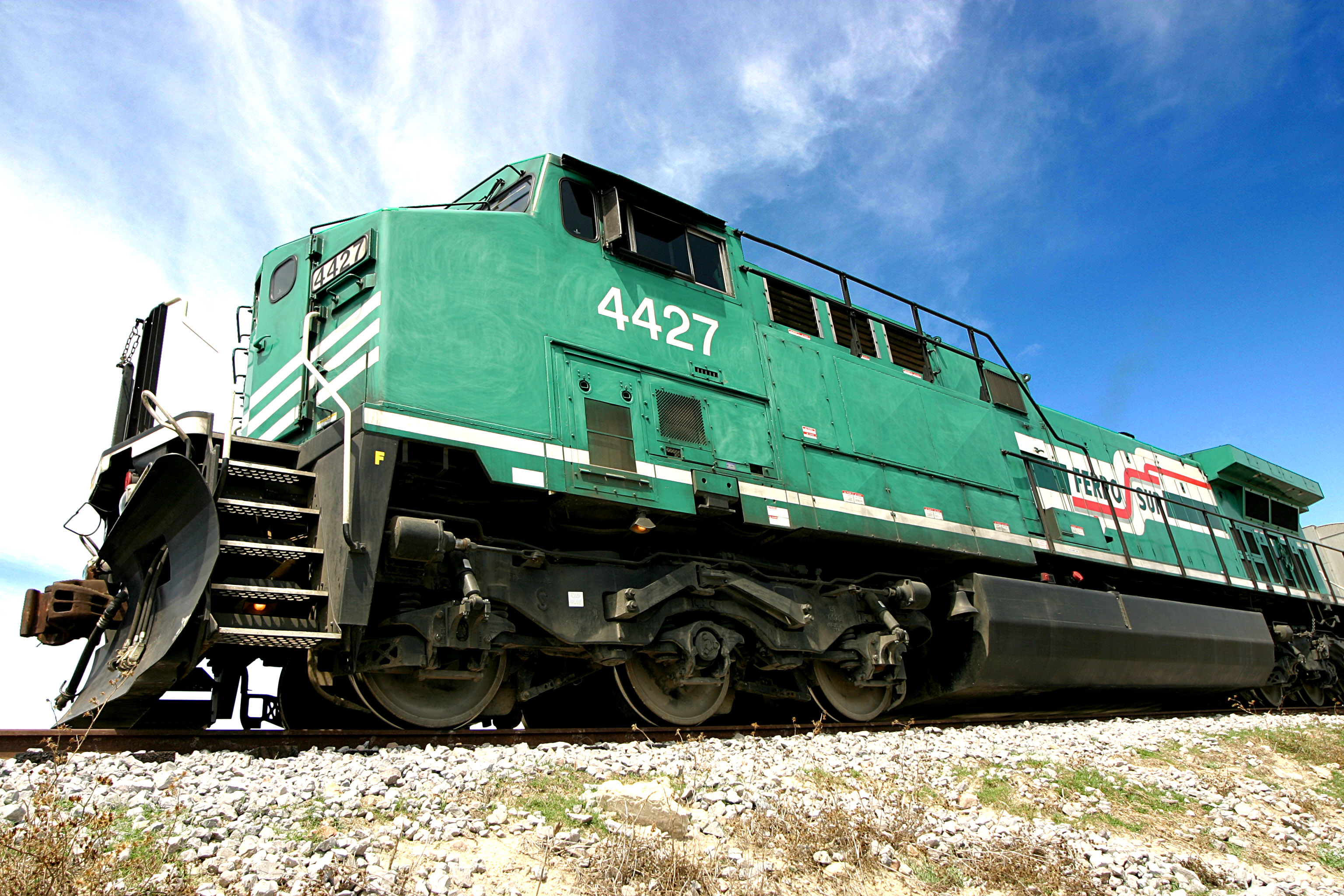
GE radial steering trucks on a GE AC4400CW

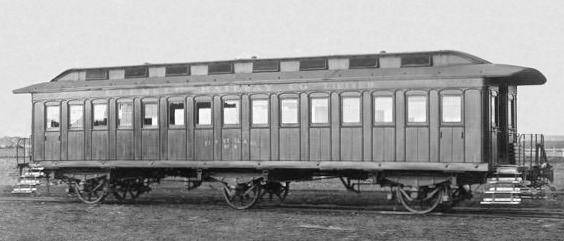
An American-built broad-gauge passenger car in South Australia, one of six fitted with Cleminson self-steering axles; pictured in 1890, ten years after their purchase

A 19th-century configuration of self-steering axles on rolling stock established the principle of radial steering. The Cleminson system involved three axles, each mounted on a frame that had a central pivot; the central axle could slide transversely. The three axles were connected by linkages that kept them parallel on the straight and moved the end ones radially on a curve, so that all three axles were continually at right angles to the rails. The configuration, invented by British engineer John James Davidge Cleminson, was first granted a patent in the UK in 1883. The system was widely used on British narrow-gauge rolling stock, such as on the Isle of Man and Manx Northern Railways. The Holdfast Bay Railway Company in South Australia, which later became the Glenelg Railway Company, purchased Cleminson-configured carriages in 1880 from the American Gilbert & Bush Company for its 1600 mm (5 ft 3 in) broad-gauge line.

== Articulated bogie ==
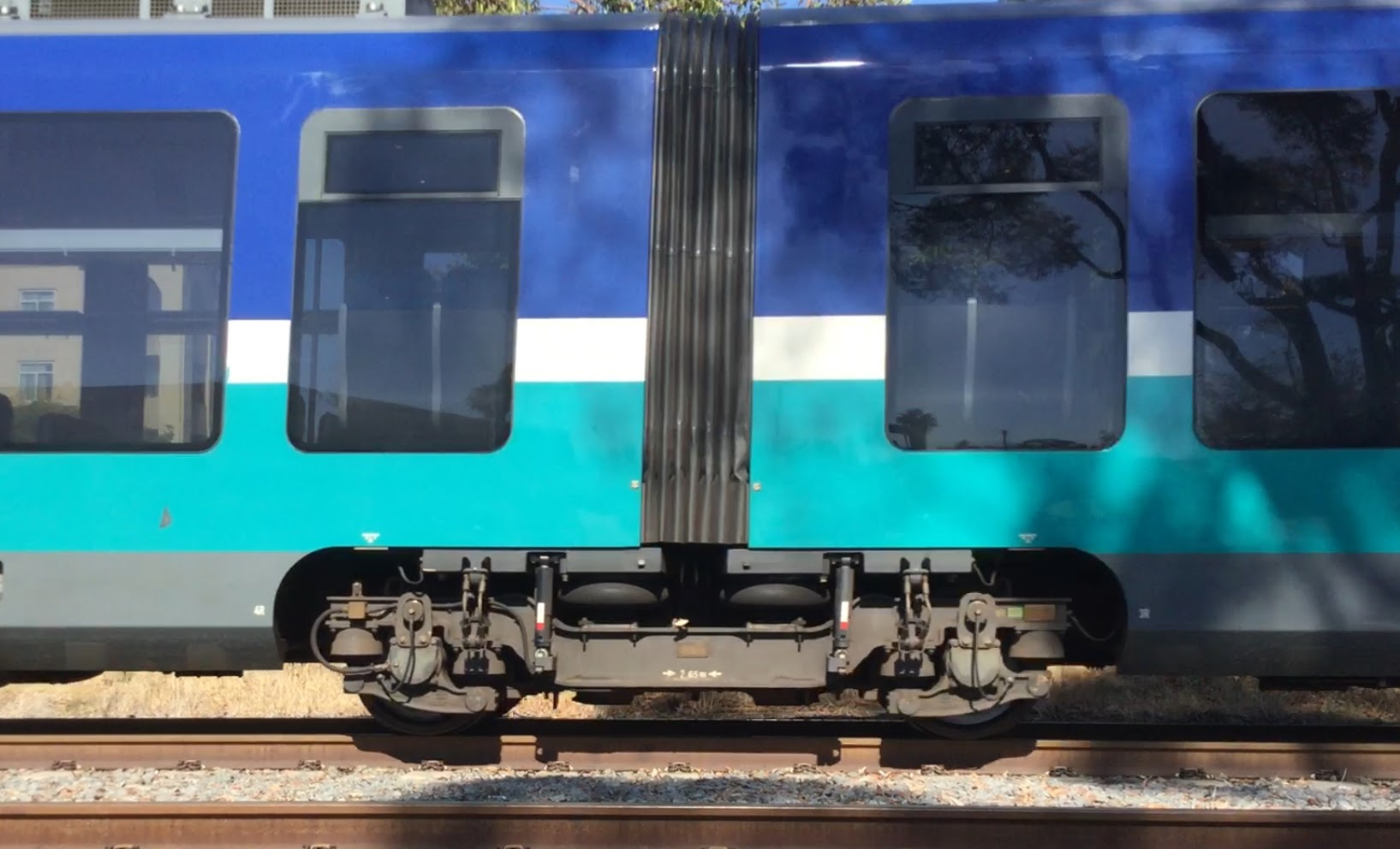
Articulated bogie on an NCTD Sprinter Siemens Desiro VT642

An articulated bogie (aka Jakob-type) is any one of several bogie designs that reduce weight, increase passenger comfort, and allow railway equipment to safely turn sharp corners, while reducing or eliminating the "screeching" normally associated with metal wheels rounding a bend in the rails. There are several such designs, and the term is also applied to train sets that incorporate articulation within the vehicle, rather than in the bogies themselves.

If one considers a single bogie "up close", it resembles a small railcar with axles at either end. The same effect that causes the bogies to rub against the rails at a longer radius causes each of the pairs of wheels to rub on the rails and cause the screeching. Articulated bogies add a second pivot point between the two axles (wheelsets) to allow them to rotate to the correct angle even in these cases.

== Articulated lorries (tractor-trailers) ==
In trucking, a bogie is the subassembly of axles and wheels that supports a semi-trailer, whether permanently attached to the frame (as on a single trailer) or making up the dolly that can be hitched and unhitched as needed when hitching up a second or third semi-trailer (as when pulling doubles or triples).

== Tracked vehicles ==
Some tanks and other tracked vehicles have bogies as external suspension components (see armoured fighting vehicle suspension). This type of bogie usually has two or more road wheels and a sprung suspension to smooth the ride over rough terrain. Bogie suspensions keep many of their components on the outside of the vehicle, saving internal space. Although vulnerable to antitank fire, they can often be repaired or replaced in the field.

== See also ==
=== Articles on bogies and trucks ===
- Arnoux system
- Bissel bogie
- Blomberg B
- Gölsdorf axle
- Jacobs bogie
- Krauss-Helmholtz bogie
- Lateral motion device
- Mason Bogie
- Pony truck
- Rocker-bogie
- Scheffel bogie
- Schwartzkopff-Eckhardt bogie
- Syntegra

=== Related topics ===
- Caster
- Dolly
- Flange
- List of railroad truck parts
- Luttermöller axle
- Road–rail vehicle
- Roller coaster wheel assembly
- Skateboard truck
- Spring (device)
- Timmis system, an early form of coil spring used on railway axles.
- Trailing wheel
- Wheel arrangement
- Wheelbase
- Wheelset
