= FS Class 680 =

Italian steam locomotive

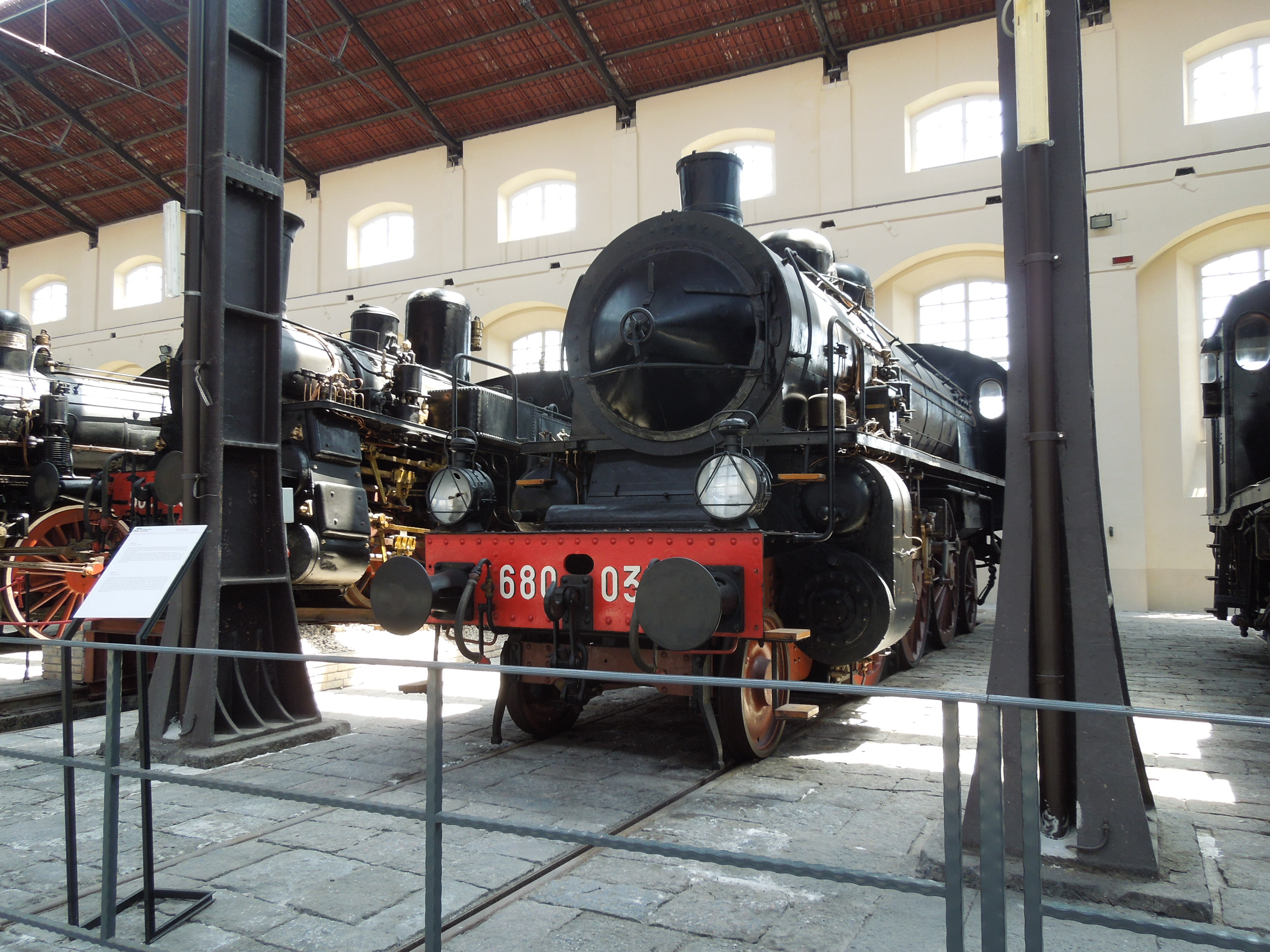
- FS locomotive 680.037 as preserved
Type and origin
- Power type: Steam
- Builder: Ernesto Breda (91), Gio. Ansaldo & C. (40), Berliner Maschinenbau (20)
- Build date: 1907–1911
- Total produced: 151
Specifications
- Configuration
  - UIC: 1′C1′ n4v
- Gauge: 1,435 mm (4 ft 8 1/2 in)
- Leading dia.: 960 mm (3 ft 1 3/4 in)
- Driver dia.: 1,850 mm (6 ft 7/8 in)
- Trailing dia.: 1,220 mm (4 ft 0 in)
- Length: 11,980 mm (39 ft 3 5/8 in)
- Axle load: 15 tonnes (15 long tons; 17 short tons)
- Loco weight: 70 tonnes (69 long tons; 77 short tons)
- Tender weight: 40.5 tonnes (39.9 long tons; 44.6 short tons)
- Fuel type: Coal
- Fuel capacity: 6,000 kg (13,000 lb)
- Water cap.: 20,000 L (4,400 imp gal; 5,300 US gal)
- Firebox
  - Grate area: 3.5 m^{2} (38 sq ft)
- Boiler pressure: 16 kg/cm^{2} (15.7 bar; 228 psi)
- Heating surface: 219.26 m^{2} (2,360.1 sq ft)
- Cylinders: Four, compound
- High-pressure cylinder: 360 mm × 650 mm (14 3/16 in × 25 9/16 in)
- Low-pressure cylinder: 590 mm × 650 mm (23 1/4 in × 25 9/16 in)
- Valve gear: Walschaerts
Performance figures
- Maximum speed: 110 km/h (68 mph)
- Power output: 1,100 CV (809 kW; 1,080 hp)
- Tractive effort: 9,000 kgf (88.3 kN; 19,800 lbf)
Career
- Operators: Ferrovie dello Stato

The Ferrovie dello Stato Italiane (FS; Italian State Railways) Class 680 (Italian: Gruppo 680) is a 2-6-2 express steam locomotive; it was the direct ancestor of the very successful and appreciated Class 685.

== Design and construction ==
The Class 680 was designed as the "normalized" successor of the famous Class 500 (reclassified by the Ferrovie dello Stato as Class 670) fast locomotives of the Rete Adriatica; in fact, even before the RA ended up being nationalized in the Ferrovie dello Stato in 1905, there was already a project (with the projected classification RA 550 for a fast 2-6-2 locomotive) which shared several similarities with what would end up becoming, under the FS ownership, the Class 680.

The Class featured the widespread Italian bogie, and the same Plancher compound engine of the Class 500, an arrangement in which the two high pressure (HP) and the two low pressure (LP) cylinders were paired together respectively on the left and the right side of the locomotive, with each pair being served by a single piston valve via crossed ports. This ingenious arrangement was simple, but it made the locomotive somewhat unbalanced and unstable, especially at higher speed.

The Class 680 was built from 1907 to 1909 in 151 units by Ernesto Breda, Gio. Ansaldo & C. and Berliner Maschinenbau, with the last two locomotives being built by the former company respectively in 1909 and 1911.

Initially, the Class 680 was fitted with a three-axle tender with a water capacity of 20,000 litres (4,400 imp gal; 5,300 US gal), but it proved prone to derail at high speeds (especially on the Genoa-Ventimiglia line); therefore, those were swapped with the bogie tenders of the Class 625, with a higher capacity of 22,000 litres (4,800 imp gal; 5,800 US gal).

== Service ==
=== A brief success ===
The first locomotive, when outshopped from the Ernesto Breda factory in 1907, was initially assigned the classification FS 6401, but a few days later it was reclassified FS 6801. Over the next years, new classifications with five and eventually six numbers (with the class and the running numbers separated by a full stop) were adopted, the class ending up as 680.XXX.

The Class 680 proved to be a thoroughly good locomotive, replacing the Class 670 from the most important services on the Rome-Naples and Florence-Rome railways. During a trial run, the locomotive 6801 (later 680.001) pulled from Parma to Piacenza a special train weighing 210 tonnes (210 long tons; 230 short tons), reaching a top speed of 118 km/h (73 mph).

However, its success was relatively brief, as in 1912 the Class 685, basically its simple-expansion and superheated version, entered service; the new locomotive was more powerful and had smoother riding qualities, and thus the recent Class 680 locomotives ended up obsolete.

=== Rebuilds and conversions ===
The last two locomotives built, the 680.150 and 151, had been fitted experimentally with a superheater from the start, but results had not been positive, as the theoretical increase in performance was offset by the reduction of steaming ability. Nevertheless, this experiment paved the way for a general rebuilding campaign for the whole class, in a bid to achieve the same performance as the Class 685.

From 1918 to 1924, seventy-three locomotives were rebuilt with a new small-tube superheater; initially allocated to the subclass 680.2XX, they were eventually reclassified in the new Class 681. A further fifteen locomotives (with two more being obtained by modifying two Class 681) also received larger HP cylinders (400 mm [15 3/4 in] instead of 360 mm [14 3/16 in]); these, initially allocated to the 680.4XX subclass, were eventually reclassified Class 682. The latter were the maximum evolution of the Plancher compound engine for passenger trains.

In 1924 and 1925, the Class 682 locomotives were assigned to the shed of Ancona and subjected to comparative trials against the Class 685; the results proved that, although the former were slightly more powerful than the latter (1,270 hp (950 kW) instead of 1,250 hp (930 kW)), they had higher consumption of water and coal, and did not ride as smoothly at high speed as the 685s. This resulted in the decision to stop any further rebuilds, and instead outright convert not only the remaining Class 680 locomotives, but also the 681 and 682, into Class 685 locomotives.

These conversions lasted from 1925 to 1933, at the end of which only four Class 680, twelve Class 681 and fifteen Class 682 remained unrebuilt, with all the remaining 120 locomotives becoming the subclasses 685.3XX and 685.5XX in the Class 685, and the separate Class S.685.5XX.

=== The last years ===
The unrebuilt locomotives continued to serve on secondary roles for the rest of their careers; before World War Two they were already being used sporadically, but during the conflict they were returned to active service. After the war, their withdrawals began, and by 1955 these were all completed.

== Preservation ==
One Class 680, the 680.037, survived in preservation; after a lengthy stay in Merano, she was eventually transferred to the Pietrarsa railway museum.
