= Class 745 =

Class 745 may refer to:

- British Rail Class 745
- FS Class 745
