= Lateral motion device =

Mechanism used on locomotives

A lateral motion device is a mechanism used in some railroad locomotives which permits the axles to move sideways relative to the frame. The device allows easier cornering.

== Purpose ==
Before the introduction of the lateral motion device, the coupled driving wheels on steam locomotives (often simply called "drivers") were held in a straight line by the locomotive's frame. The flanges of the drivers were spaced a bit closer than the rail gauge, and they could still fit between the rails when tracking through a mild curve. At some degree of curvature, though, the flanges on the center driver would begin to bind in the curve. The closer the front and rear drivers were, the smaller the radius of curve that the locomotive could negotiate. One solution was to make the center driver(s) "blind," i.e. without flanges on the tires. The other solution was to allow at least one of the axles (often the front driver) to move laterally relative to the frame, and such designs incorporated various devices to permit this motion.

== Variations ==
Typically the bearing boxes were designed to allow the axle to slide some either way, and the wheel cranks and the coupling rods were modified to accommodate this extra range of motion. Spring centering might also be provided to keep the wheels on such axles from hunting side to side.

One example was the Italian State Railways class 640 2-6-0. The frontmost axle did not carry a conventional pony truck. Instead, this axle along with the front-driven axle together carried a bogie. This driving axle had a lateral play of about 20 mm (0.79 in), and spherical bearings were used on the cranks and coupling rods to this axle (the engine used inside cylinders driving the middle set of drivers). The first two axles worked together to guide the locomotive, similar to a conventional leading bogie. The Dovregubben class 2-8-4 on the Norwegian State Railways also used this Zara bogie.

The Southern Pacific class 5000 4-10-2 employed a conventional leading bogie but used lateral motion devices on the leading driven axle to reduce the rigid wheelbase. Their GS-4 class 4-8-4 also did and employed springs to control the lateral motion, thereby assisting the bogie in easing the engine into curves. On the Hungarian State Railways class 424 4-8-0s, the rear axle was given 50 mm (2.0 in) of lateral motion "to ease the running on sharp curves."

The experimental AA20 4-14-4 was the only locomotive ever to have seven coupled driving axles. It used lateral motion devices on the first and seventh axles as well as blind drivers on the third, fourth and fifth axles but these measures were not enough to allow it to negotiate curves without damaging the track, derailing, or both.

== See also ==
- Adams axle
- Articulated locomotives
- Beugniot lever
- Cleminson's patent
- Luttermöller axle
- Minimum railway curve radius
