= FS Class E.432 =

Class E.432
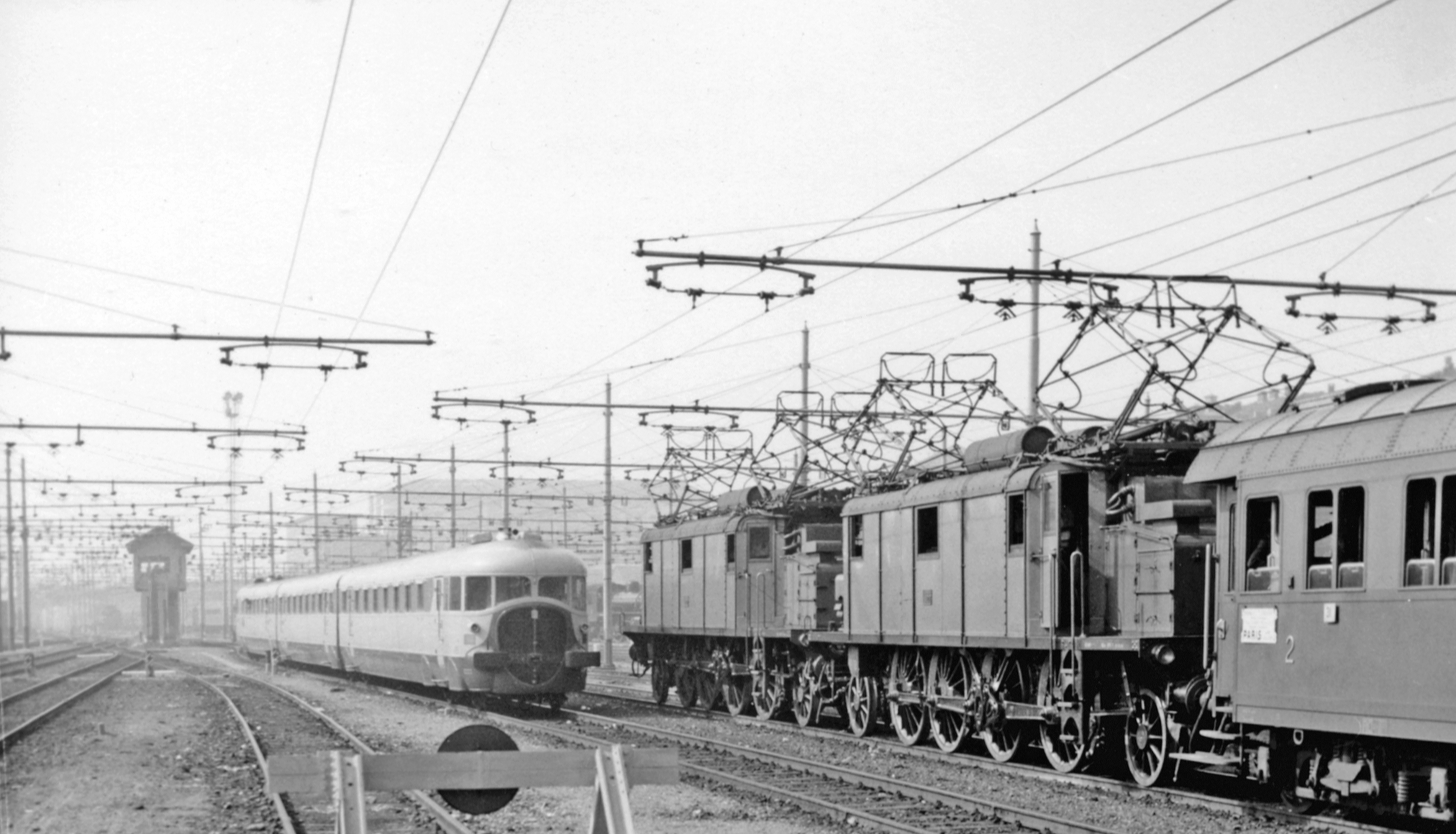
- Torino Porta Nuova in 1959: Two 1-D-1 electric locomotives (Class E.432) are about to leave on an express to Paris via the Fréjus Rail Tunnel
Type and origin
- Power type: electric
- Builder: Società Ernesto Breda
- Build date: 1928
- Total produced: 40
Specifications
- Configuration
  - AAR: 1-D-1
  - UIC: 1′D1′
- Gauge: 1,435 mm (4 ft 8 1/2 in) standard gauge
- Leading dia.: 1.11 m (44 in)
- Driver dia.: 1.63 m (64 in)
- Trailing dia.: 1.11 m (44 in)
- Length: 13.91 metres (45 ft 8 in)
- Adhesive weight: 71 tonnes (70 long tons; 78 short tons)
- Loco weight: 94 tonnes (93 long tons; 104 short tons)
- Electric system/s: Three-phase overhead line 3.6 kV, 16 2/3 Hz
- Current pickups: Two, twin collector pantographs
- Traction motors: Two 1,475 brake horsepower (1,100 kW) synchronous AC
Performance figures
- Maximum speed: 100 km/h (62 mph)
- Power output: 2,200 kW (3,000 hp)
- Tractive effort: 30,856 lbf (137.25 kN)
Career
- Operators: FS
- Disposition: Two preserved

FS Class E.432 was a class of three-phase electric locomotives of the Italian State Railways. Forty of these 1′D1′ locomotives were built in 1928 by Società Ernesto Breda and two have been preserved.

== History ==
Given the success obtained with the three-phase operation, the electrification continued and with it the demand for ever better performance. The previous E.431s proved to be disappointing, so that around 1926, the Traction Service of the State Railways set up a new locomotive project. Under the direction of Giuseppe Bianchi it was also decided to disengage from dependence on foreign patents for the pantographs, the connecting rods and transmission from the motors to the wheels. The new locomotives were ordered from Ernesto Breda in two batches totalling 40 units. The E.432 from 1929 went into service on the important Porrettana and Brennero lines and later on the lines between Turin and Genoa, towards the Val di Susa, and on the Ligurian coast lines, especially that of the west. They were pulling the most important and heaviest trains, fast, direct and international. They were often used in pairs and sometimes with other classes such as E.431 or E.333. On steeply-graded lines they might be used with small-wheel versions like the E.554. They were also used on local trains.

With the direct current conversion of the most important lines, which occurred in the first half of the 1960s, they were concentrated in the locomotive depots of Savona and Cuneo, where they spent their last decade on more modest services at the head of trains along the Turin-Savona and Turin-Cuneo routes and related branches. E.432.008 hauled a special train from Alessandria to Acqui Terme on 25 May 1976 to mark the end of three-phase traction which, since the beginning of the first experiments, had lasted more than three quarters of a century.

== Technical features ==
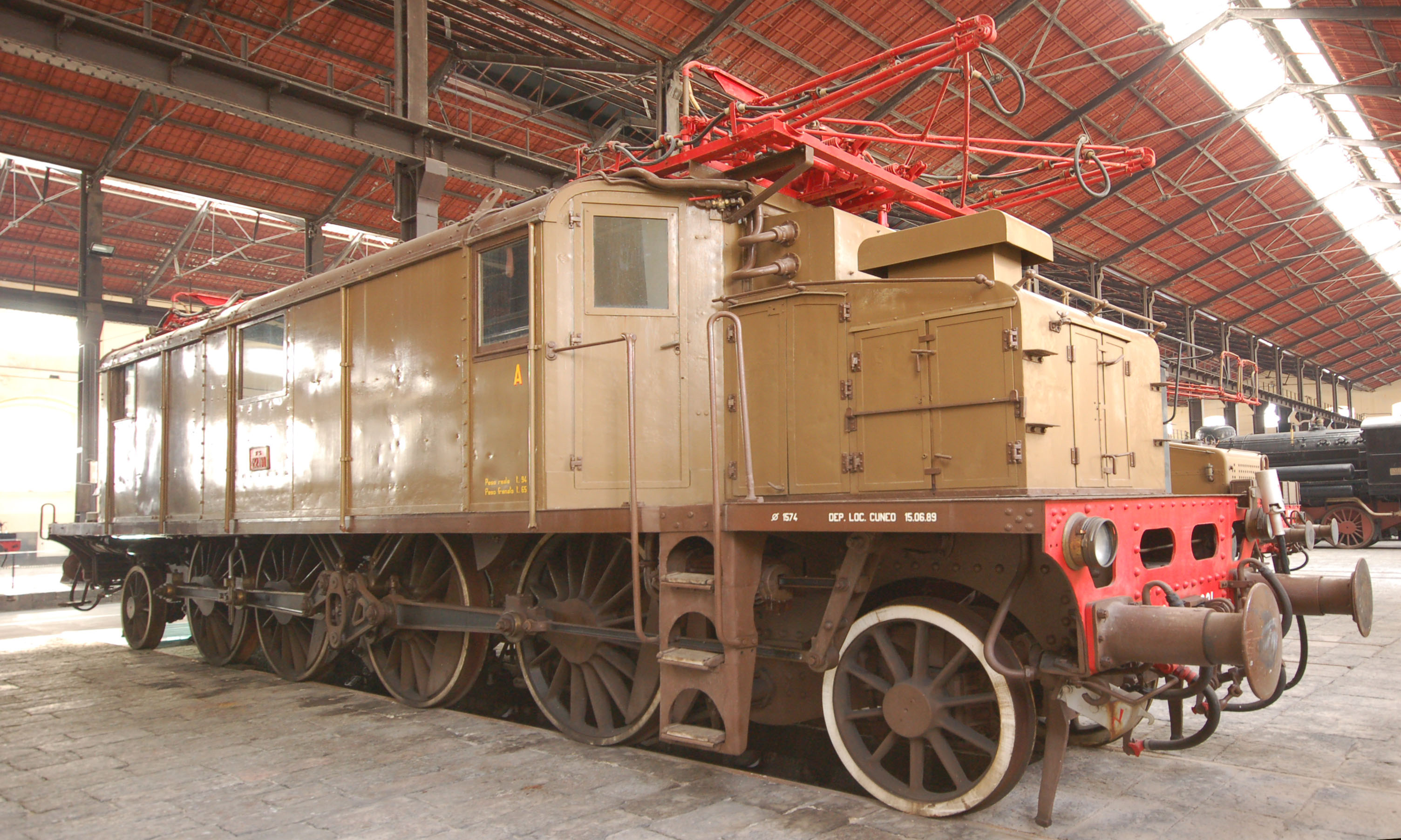
432.011 preserved in 2008

=== Mechanical part ===
The E.432 locomotive had a 1′D1′ wheel arrangement and the driving wheels were of 1.63-metre (64 in) diameter. The carrying wheels were of 1.11-metre (44 in) diameter and were mounted on Italian-style trollies to better negotiate curves. The locomotive was designed for fast and heavy passenger services.

The driving wheels were coupled by coupling rods and received the motion from the two traction motors by means of a special articulated connecting rod designed by Bianchi. There were sliding bearings to ease the negotiation of curves. The frame-mounted traction motors were dismountable from above for maintenance. The wheels were of the type used on steam locomotives with balance weights and cranks at 90 degrees.

Above the frame was a central cab and a short bonnet at each end. One bonnet housed the liquid rheostat with its pump and evaporative cooling device.

=== Electrical part ===
The electrical part consisted of two three-phase AC motors of imposing size, just under two metres in diameter and twenty tonnes in weight. Each of them was equipped with a fan for forced air cooling. The circuit allowed cascade connection for starting and parallel connection for running at high speed. In addition, there were three different armature connections for 12, 8 or 6 pole running. This gave combinations for four speeds: 37.5, 50, 75, and 100 km/h (23.3, 31.1, 46.6, and 62.1 mph). The switches for pole-changing were in boxes located above the motors. A liquid rheostat (containing sodium carbonate solution) was provided to limit the current during start-up and pole-changing. The necessary connections were established using a drum controller.

The cascade connection, little used, was eliminated around 1940. It was found more practical to start the locomotive at the second speed, by using the rheostat, and making less use of high voltage switching which was always a source of problems. Moreover, the motors were inclined to overheat when using cascade connection.

Current collection was by two double-sided pantographs mounted on the roof of the cab and always used together.

=== Multiple unit control ===
The success of the "Ligurian" multiple control, already tried on Classes E.551, E.554, E.333 and E.431, led to the idea of adopting it as standard equipment on all three-phase locomotives, excluding only the oldest types. The conversion of four members of Class E.432 was planned, but was completed only on a single unit.

The first units chosen were E.432.002 and 030. On these two machines, as on E.431.018 and 036, the additional installation of a high voltage coupling was planned, which would have allowed the second unit to run with pantographs lowered. However, the work was delayed pending the practical results of the two E.431s.

In the meantime, union problems arose with railway staff who feared possible future job reductions. In the early 1960s, the elimination of three-phase traction on the Fréjus and Giovi lines was already on the horizon and FS decided to suspend the programme. Ultimately, the only E.432 locomotive equipped with the "Ligurian" multiple control was E.432.030. Number E.432.002 had entered the workshop but work on converting it was never completed.

== Locomotive allocations ==
Early

- Bologna locomotive depot
- Bolzano locomotive depot
- Turin locomotive depot
- Genoa locomotive depot

Later

- Savona locomotive depot
- Cuneo locomotive Depot

From 1974

- Alessandria locomotive depot

== Preservation ==
Two locomotives are preserved.

- E 432.001 at the National Railway Museum of Pietrarsa, Naples. The locomotive was restored in the Cuneo locomotive depot workshop in 1988/1989
- E 432.031 at the Piedmontese Railway Museum, Savigliano, undergoing aesthetic restoration (2017)
