= Luttermöller axle =

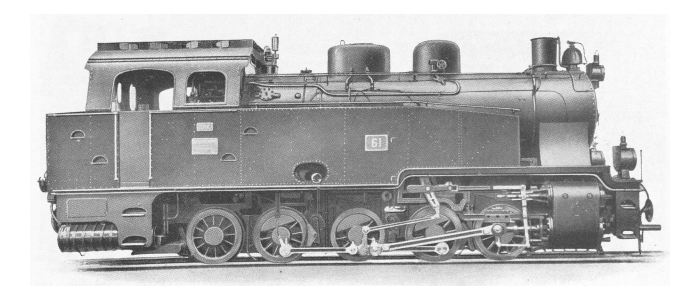
O&K Luttermöller 0-10-0T locomotive 61 of the South Harz Railway Company

A Luttermöller axle is an unusual steam locomotive component. Steam locomotives with several axles or wheelsets connected to one another by coupling rods are not able to negotiate tight curves well. In order to assist such locomotives, the manager of the Orenstein & Koppel factory in Berlin, Dr. Luttermöller, built the axle system named after him.

== Overview ==
With this system, the outermost of several sets of successive driving wheel sets are not connected by coupling rods to crankshaft journals on the outside of the wheels, but by cogwheels located in the centre of the axles. The axles are housed in the locomotive frame such that they are able to move at right angles to the axis of the rails to a certain degree, likewise the cogwheels are able to slide relative to one another. In this way curves can be negotiated with less friction being generated.

== Use ==
=== Germany ===
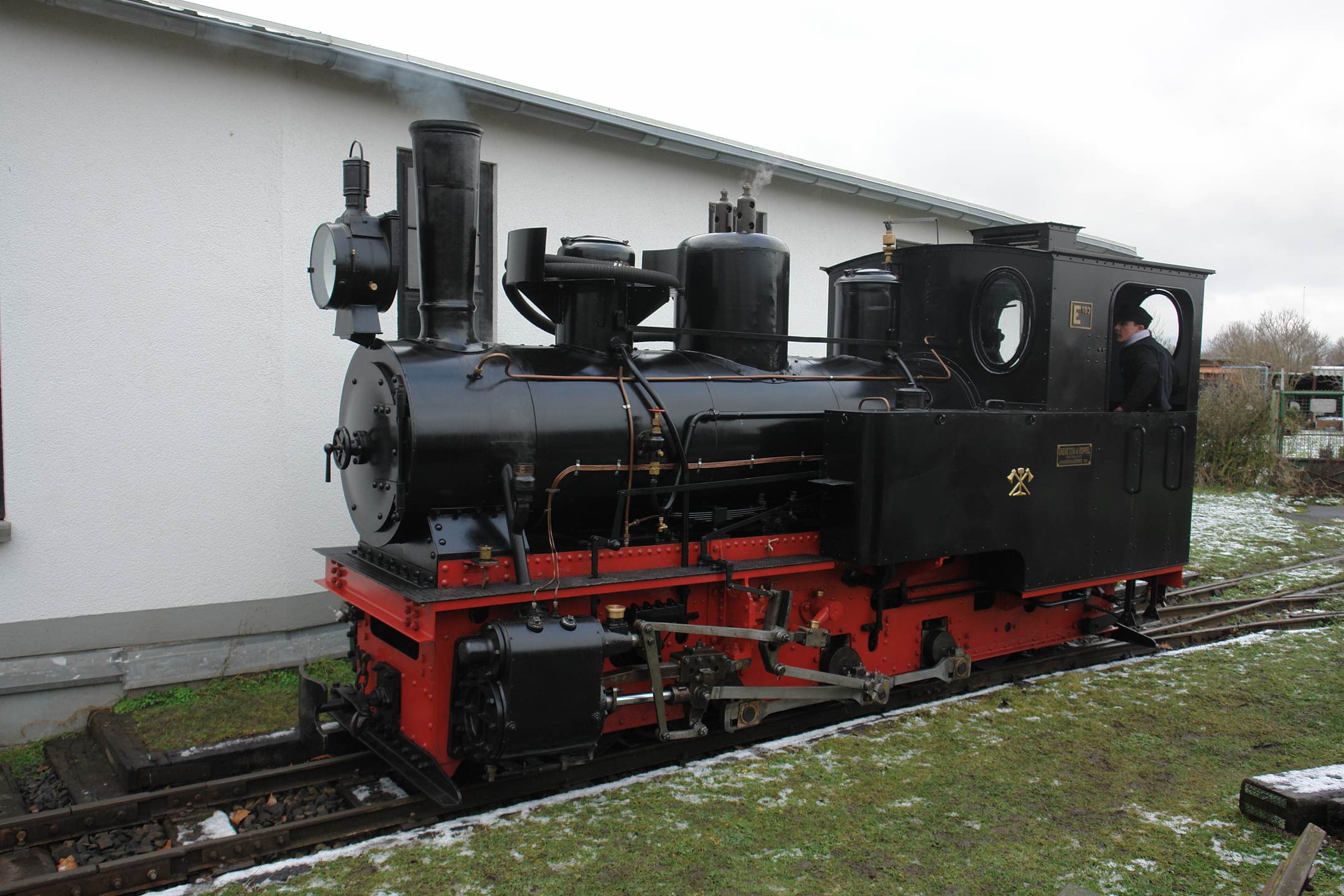
IJA E103

For the Hamburg Harbour railway with its tight curves, the ten-coupled steam locomotives of Class 87 were built with Luttermöller axles, front and rear. The 16 locomotives of this class were however retired as early as 1954, because they tended to overheat at higher speeds and could therefore only be used for shunting duties.

A five-axled, 1,000 mm (3 ft 3 3/8 in) metre gauge, steam engine with the Luttermöller system was procured by the private South Harz Railway (Südharz-Eisenbahn; Braunlage - Walkenried - Tanne) in 1928 from Orenstein & Koppel with operating number 61. It proved itself so well on the winding route, that in 1930 two Mallet locomotives, built in 1925, were converted to the Luttermöller system by Henschel (operating numbers 56 and 57). Henschel had to obtain a licence from Orenstein & Koppel to use Luttermöller axles.

=== Indonesia ===
Luttermöller axles found further use on narrow gauge lines, e.g. in Java (Indonesia).

=== Argentina ===
Several 2' gauge Luttermöller locomotives built by Orenstein & Koppel were exported for use in Argentina at the Ingenio San Martin del Tabacal sugar cane refinery in the Salta Province near the town of Hipólito Yrigoyen, Salta. Four of these engines were bought by Preston Services and moved to Kent in the UK where two are currently stored with the third and fourth sold to new owners. A fifth locomotive from a different Argentinian sugar mill was also sold by Preston Services and now resides at the Böhmetal Kleinbahn in Germany.

== See also ==
- Gölsdorf axle
- Heywood radiating axle locomotives
- Klien-Lindner axle
- Klose-Lenkwerk
- Krauss-Helmholtz bogie
- Lateral motion device
