= Gölsdorf axle =

Locomotive axle system

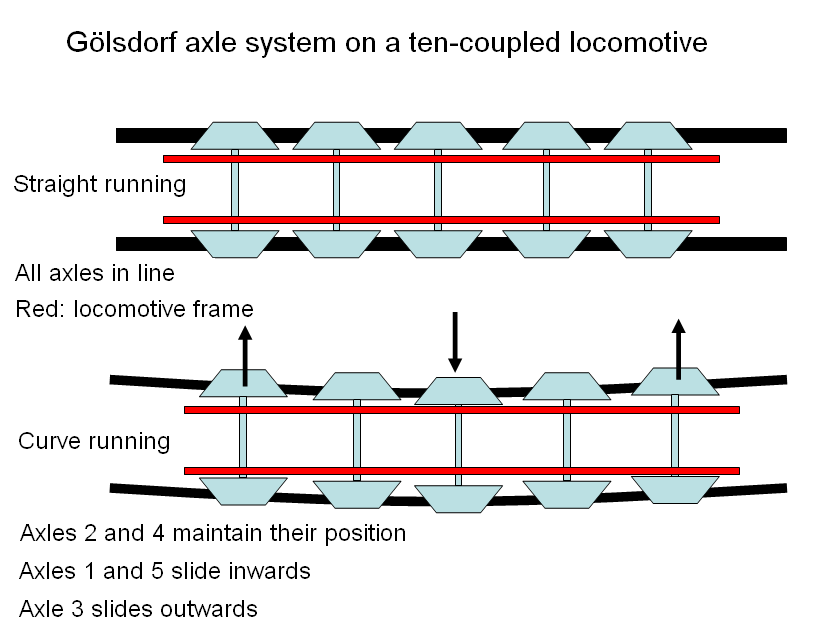
Gölsdorf axle principle on a ten-coupled steam engine

The Gölsdorf axle system is used on railway Gölsdorf locomotives to achieve quiet running and low wear-and-tear when negotiating curves. The axle system comprises a combination of fixed axles and axles that can slide transversely, all within a single, rigid locomotive frame. The system was invented by a young Austrian locomotive builder, Karl Gölsdorf, around the end of the 19th century. The first locomotive to use this principle entered service in 1897.

== Overview ==
In the early days of the railway, locomotives were built with more and more axles in order to meet the increasingly heavy loads of goods trains. In order not to overstress the tracks, axle loads were often restricted, initially to 16 tonnes, occasionally to 18 tonnes and later usually to 20 tonnes. A ten-coupled locomotive had to weigh no more than 100 tonnes plus whatever tonnage the leading and trailing wheels could support. The heavier a locomotive is, the more surface pressure it places on the wheels and the more it can haul. But as more and more axles are added, curve running becomes increasingly difficult. So early on, work began to develop multi-part frames and bogies which linked sets of axles to their own drive. However driving wheels within bogies using steam was a difficult task due to the moving seals that were required. As a result, a different avenue of development was pursued, whereby a degree of smooth curve running could be achieved using a long, rigid frame through the use, for example, of axles that had sufficient sideways play. The Gölsdorf axle system avoided the need for complicated construction methods like that of Mallet locomotives. It was in effect an artifice enabling locomotives to retain a long, rigid frame (without articulation or bogies), yet whose individual axles could be better aligned when curve running.

It has been alleged that the Gölsdorf system was developed by the Henschel company to avoid the patents and royalties of the LMA system.

== Operation ==
On a ten-coupled locomotive, two of the five axles are fixed rigidly to the frame by their axle boxes. The outer- and innermost axles, however, are fitted into their bearings and attached to their drives such that they can move sideways during curve running, depending on the sideways forces acting on them. In addition, the connecting and coupling rods, through which linear forces from the steam pistons are translated into rotation of the wheels via the crank pins, must also be able to move sideways.

== Use ==
The Gölsdorf system was a standard for decades in the construction of, usually ten-coupled, occasionally twelve-coupled goods train locomotives. One of the first companies in Germany to introduce Gölsdorf axles was the privately run Westphalian State Railway (Westfälische Landeseisenbahn), whose heavy goods trains between Belecke and Erwitte needed powerful, but nevertheless agile, locomotives in order to cross the Haarstrang hills. From about 1910 the WLE procured and used second-hand ten-coupled engines for hauling freight trains and improved their curve running by having their running gear converted to the Gölsdorf system. Three such locomotives were sold to the Ledesma sugar cane refinery.

== See also ==
- List of DRG locomotives and railbuses
- List of Bavarian locomotives and railbuses
- List of Prussian locomotives and railcars
- Klien-Lindner axle
- Klose-Lenkwerk
- Luttermöller axle

== Sources ==
Fridrich Risse, Günter Krause: Die Dampflokomotiven der WLE, Fahrzeuge und Anlagen der Westfälischen Landes-Eisenbahn, DGEG-Medien, Hövelhof, ISBN 3-937189-25-4
