= Krauss-Helmholtz bogie =

Mechanism used on steam locomotives to improve curve running

1: Frame 2: Coupled axles, with sideplay 3: Pivot pin 4: Shaft

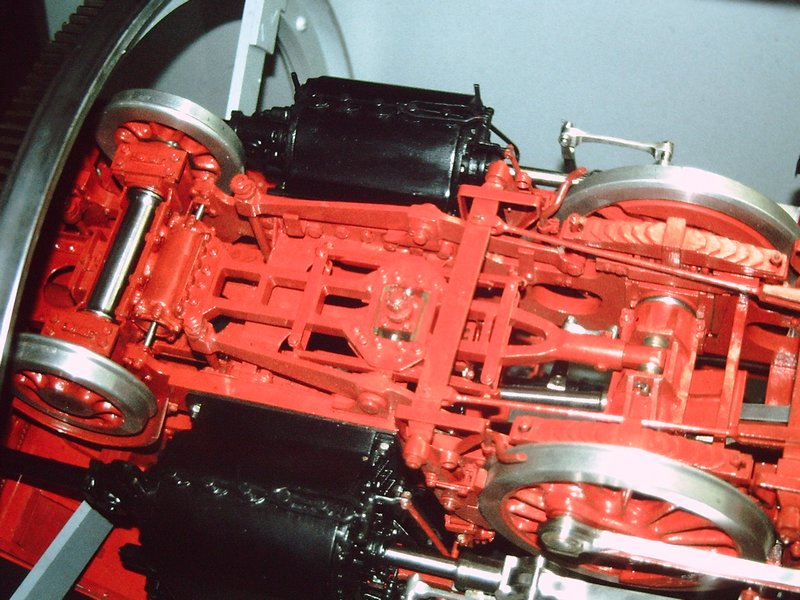
Krauss-Helmholtz bogie on a 1:10 scale miniature locomotive.

A Krauss-Helmholtz bogie (Krauss-Helmholtz-Lenkgestell) is a mechanism used on steam locomotives and some electric locomotives to improve curve running.

== Operation ==
The bogie comprises a carrying axle connected to a coupled axle via a shaft or lever. In straight running, any radial movement of the carrying axle results in a sideways movement of the coupled axle in the opposite direction. However, the carrying axle is centred by means of two heavy duty springs just behind it. In addition the pivot pin may be allowed to move sideways, but again is held centrally by heavy springs. When travelling round a curve, the carrying axle swings to one side causing the coupled axle to move sideways in the opposite direction. In this way radial forces during curve running are more or less evened out on both axles, so that riding qualities similar to those of a normal bogie are achieved and wear and tear reduced on wheel flanges and rails.

The bogie is a type of pony truck and was named after the locomotive firm of Krauss and the engineer, Richard von Helmholtz. By contrast a Bissel bogie is independently installed in the frame, and sideways guidance of the locomotive is achieved by elastic forces. The distribution of these forces is not tightly defined and, in addition, they are dependent on the curve radius.

== Examples of use ==
=== Steam locomotives ===
Because the advantages of a pony truck come into play particularly on tight curves, the Krauss-Helmholtz bogie initially appeared on branch line, Lokalbahn and narrow gauge locomotives. One of the first locomotives of this type was the Bavarian D VIII. On this tank locomotive the bogie was located at the rear; however in the majority of cases it was at the front or - if the locomotive had to have equally good riding qualities in both directions - at both ends.

Later this pony truck arrangement was also adopted by the DRG standard locomotives (Einheitslokomotive) of the Deutsche Reichsbahn, e.g. on the ten-coupled classes: 44, 45, 50 and 85. An exception was the Class 84, that was fitted with Schwartzkopff-Eckhardt II bogies or Luttermöller axle drives.

The tender locomotives of classes 41 and 45 only had a Krauss-Helmholtz bogie at the front; the trailing axle was housed in a Bissel bogie. The tank locomotives of Class 85, like some of the Class 64 and 86 engines, had two Krauss-Helmholtz bogies.

=== Electric locomotives ===
Even the electric locomotives of Reichsbahn classes E 04, E 17, E 18 and E 19 were fitted with comparable pony trucks, known as AEG frames (AEG-Gestell). Because the axles had external bearings, the lever linkage also had to be on the outside, a characteristic detail of these locomotives.

=== Italian bogie ===
In Italy, the Krauss-Helmholtz bogie was improved around 1900 by Giuseppe Zara, a technician of the Rete Adriatica and later of the Ferrovie dello Stato; by modifying the structure, rearranging the weight distribution and allowing the bogie to also move transversally respective to the locomotive's frames, he created the Italian bogie (a lighter and somewhat different version was the later Zara bogie). It saw widespread use, being fitted on many Italian steam locomotive classes, like the FS Class 625, FS Class 740 and FS Class 685. The electrical locomotive FS Class E.432 also used this bogie type.

== See also ==
- Bogie
- Cleminson's patent
- Heywood radiating axle locomotives
- Lateral motion device
- List of DRG locomotives and railbuses
- List of Bavarian locomotives and railbuses
- List of Prussian locomotives and railcars
- Minimum railway curve radius
