= FS Class 625 =

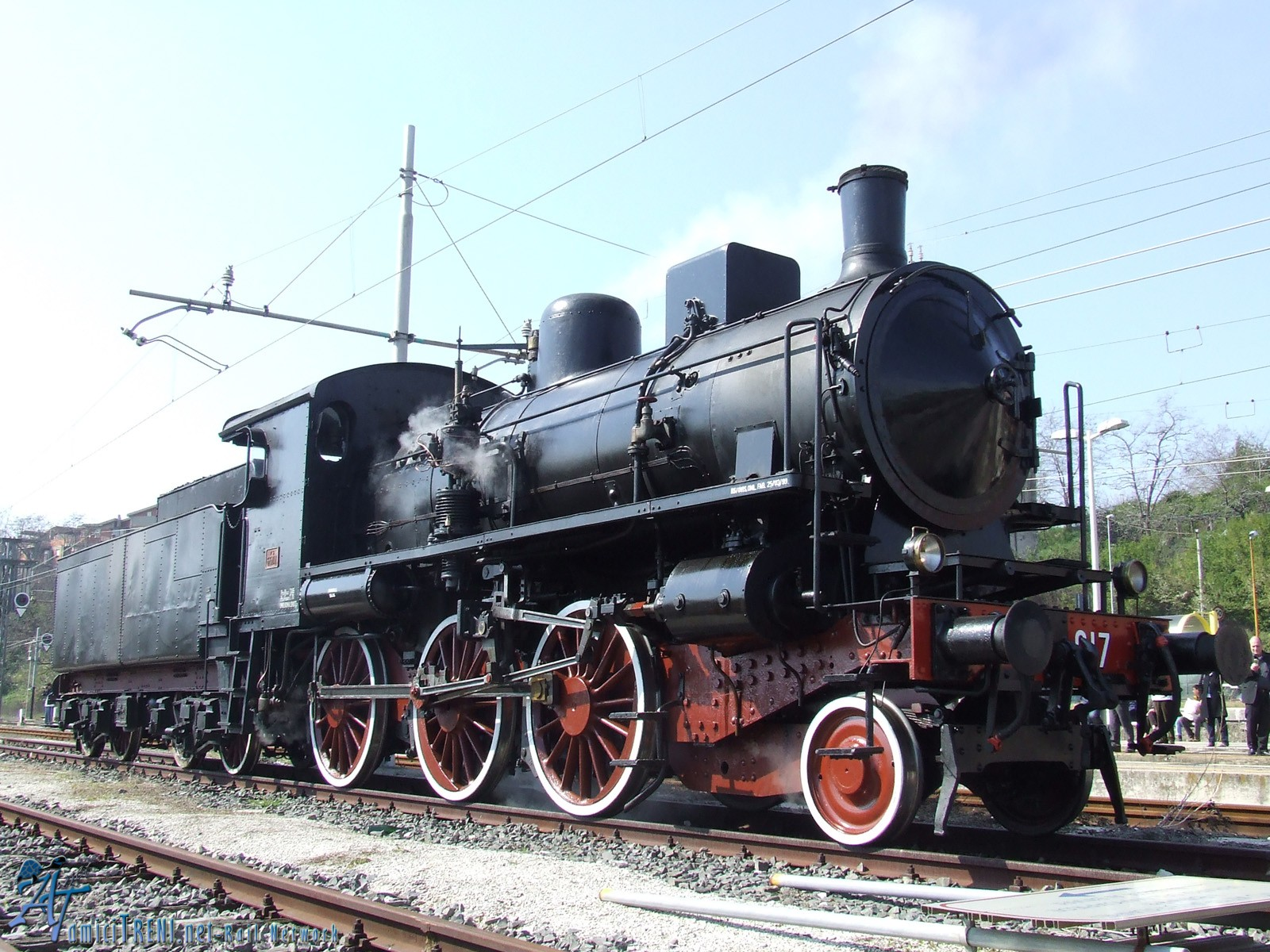
- Locomotive 625 017
Type and origin
- Power type: Steam
- Builder: Gio. Ansaldo & C., Costruzioni Meccaniche di Saronno, Berliner Maschinenbau
- Build date: 1914–1923
- Total produced: 188
- Number rebuilt: 153
Specifications
- Configuration
  - UIC: 1′C h2
- Gauge: 1,435 mm (4 ft 8 1/2 in) standard gauge
- Leading dia.: 840 mm (33.07 in)
- Driver dia.: 1,510 mm (59.45 in)
- Length: 9.66 m (31 ft 8 3/8 in)
- Axle load: 14.4 tonnes (14.2 long tons; 15.9 short tons)
- Loco weight: 53.9 tonnes (53.0 long tons; 59.4 short tons)
- Tender weight: 31.9 tonnes (31.4 long tons; 35.2 short tons)
- Fuel type: Coal
- Fuel capacity: 6,000 kg (13,000 lb)
- Water cap.: 12,000 L (2,600 imp gal; 3,200 US gal)
- Firebox
  - Grate area: 2.42 m^{2} (26.0 sq ft)
- Boiler pressure: 12 kg_{f}/cm^{2} (1.18 MPa; 171 psi)
- Heating surface: 108.5 m^{2} (1,168 sq ft)
- Superheater
  - Heating area: 33.5 m^{2} (361 sq ft)
- Cylinders: Two, inside
- Cylinder size: 490 mm × 700 mm (19.29 in × 27.56 in)
- Valve gear: Walschaerts, Caprotti
Performance figures
- Maximum speed: 80 km/h (50 mph)
- Power output: 800 CV (590 kW; 790 hp)
- Tractive effort: 10,200 kgf (100 kN; 22,500 lbf)

The Ferrovie dello Stato (FS, Italian State Railways) Class 625 (Italian: Gruppo 625) is a class of 2-6-0 'mogul' steam locomotives in Italy. The class is commonly known by the nickname Signorine (Italian for 'young ladies', also shared with the similar Class 640 locomotives), or Signorina in the singular, because of their perceived grace and beauty compared to other locomotives.

== Design and construction ==
The Class 625 was the superheated and simple-expansion version of the pre-existing mixed traffic Class 600 design. Following the success of the Class 640 (itself a superheated and simple-expansion version of the older Class 630 engines) previous designs were altered accordingly, and 108 of the class were built by various companies in Italy between 1910 and 1914, with a further 80 constructed between 1922 and 1923, the last 25 by Berliner Maschinenbau; the gap in the production run was caused by the events of World War I.

== Class 625 3xx conversions ==
From 1929 onwards the existing 188 class 625 locomotives were supplemented by a further 153 locomotives rebuilt from older FS Class 600 engines; those, that could be distinguished from the Class 625 only from their being compound and non-superheated locomotives, had been constructed between 1904 and 1910 by Gio. Ansaldo & C., Costruzioni Meccaniche di Saronno, and Henschel & Son. A total of 153 class 600 engines were superheated, fitted with Caprotti valve gear and reclassified as class 625 machines between 1929 and 1933. Their class number changed from 600 to 625; they retained the sequential numbering from their original classification, but with the initial number altered to a 3. Thus the original 600 008 became 625 308, for example. After 1933 the remaining unrebuilt 95 class 600 engines were gradually scrapped.

== Operation ==
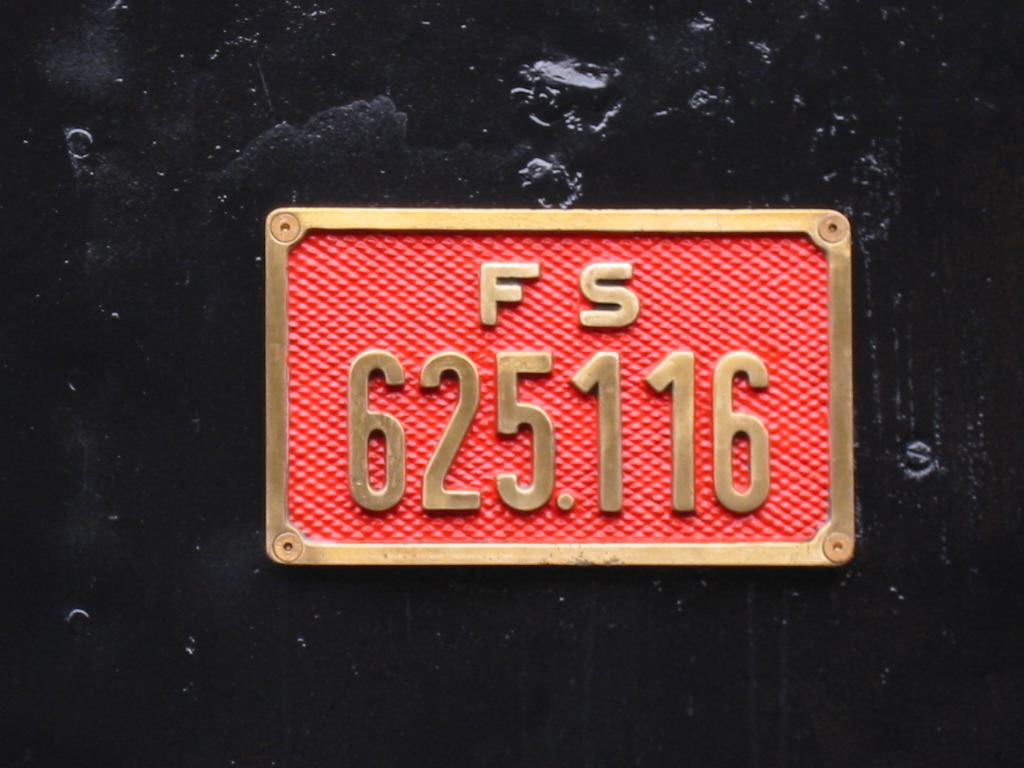
FS 625.116 numberplate

The locomotives were designed for mixed-traffic operation (use on both passenger and freight services) and were designed to operate on steep gradients. The first examples of the class entered service upon completion in 1910, and the final operational examples were withdrawn from mainline service in 1976. A number of locomotives in the class were retained in mothballed working condition as part of Italian Railways' policy of keeping steam locomotives in reserve, well into the era of internal combustion and electric motive power. The final withdrawal from the reserve fleet was locomotive 625 100 in 1998.

== Class 623 conversions ==
In the early 1950s a total of 35 class 625 locomotives, of which ten were ex-Class 600 rebuilds, were rebuilt into the class 623. Fitted with the Franco-Crosti boiler (with two pre-heaters placed on the sides of the boiler), these engines were visually distinctive. The design was not successful, and these engines were all withdrawn by the early 1970s, with none surviving into preservation.

== In popular culture ==
A number of scale models of class 625 locomotives have been manufactured by Italian model company Rivarossi.

Locomotive 625 116 featured in the 2013 Italian cinema film The Magistrate by Giulio Base.

Locomotive 625 017 has gained some attention through operations on the Vatican Railway (the world's only national railway network to own no locomotives). The engine hauled a train for Pope John XXIII in 1962, and in 2015 hauled the inaugural train of Pope Francis's weekly train service from Vatican City railway station to Castel Gandolfo. The engine has also hauled the Italian royal family.

== Preservation ==
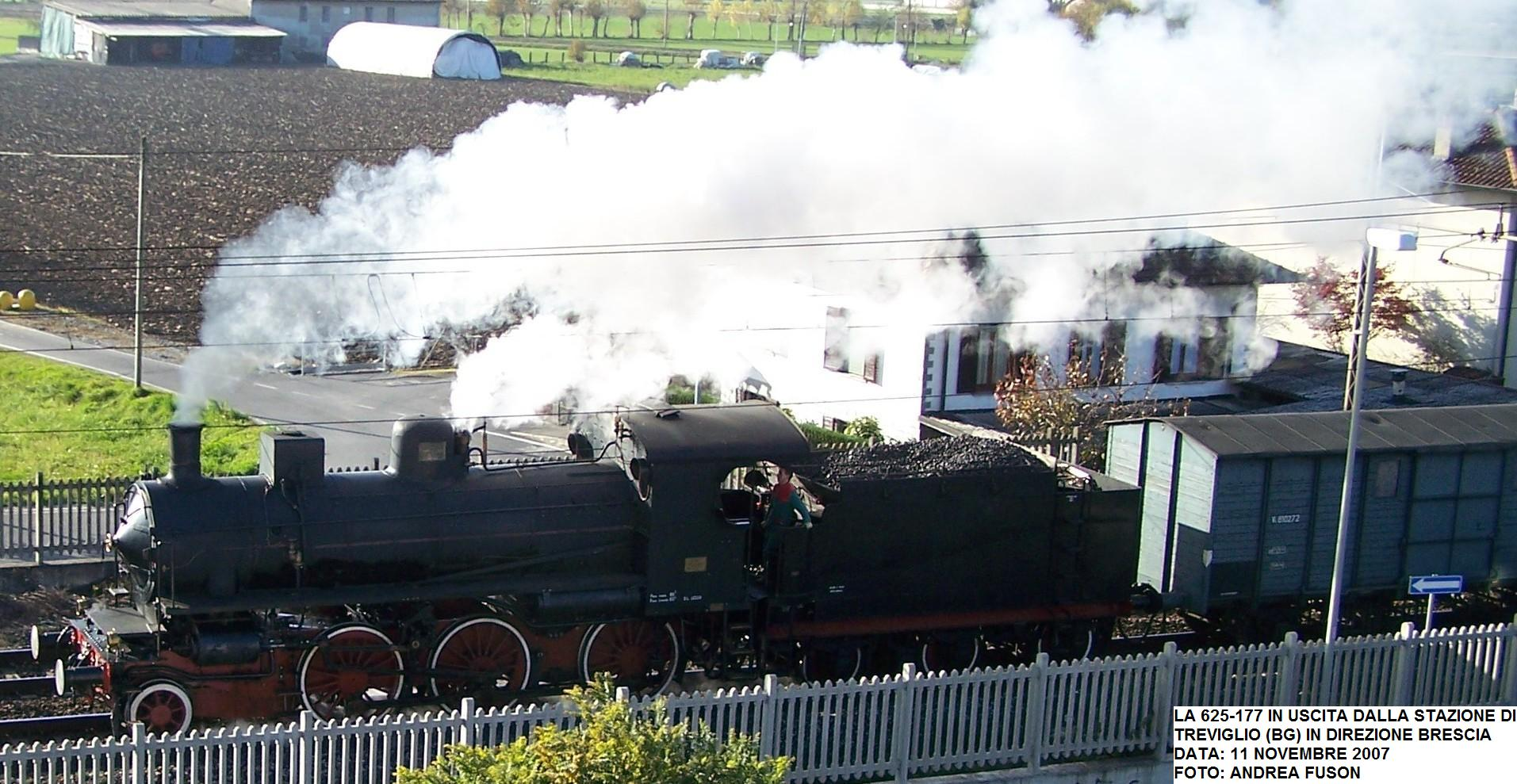
Preserved 625 177 on an enthusiasts' charter train.

Twenty-five Class 625 locomotives survived into preservation; among them 625.100, 625.116 (private museum owner), 625.142 and 625.177 are currently operational and available for heritage trains.

Of particular note is 625.308, the only remaining FS locomotive with internal Caprotti valve gear, currently being restored at Pistoia.
