= Giuseppe Zara =

Italian inventor and engineer

Giuseppe Zara (Fermo, 1856 – Sanremo, 1915) was an Italian inventor. He was a member of the Società Italiana per le Strade Ferrate Meridionali, and the director of Ferrovie dello Stato from 1905.

He graduated at the Technical Institute of Fermo in 1875, and started working as a repairing operator in Rimini, he was later sent to Florence where he worked as a designer.

In the emergency of having faster and cheaper trains, he invented a simple bissel truck system to replace Mogul 130 in steam locomotives ( « Carrello Italiano ») which was used from 1907 to 1930 not only in Italian train companies, but also in others like the Compagnie du chemin de fer de Paris à Orléans in France.

== Sources ==
- Giuseppe Zara, in Collegio Ingegneri Ferroviari Italiani, a. 4, 7 (1915), n. 4, pp. 161–164
- Gianni Robert, Le ferrovie nel Mondo, Milano, Vallardi, 1964, p. 514
- Guido Corbellini, Il cinquantenario delle Ferrovie dello Stato, in 1905-1955. Il Cinquantenario delle Ferrovie dello Stato, in Collegio Ingegneri Ferroviari Italiani, 10 (1955), n. 5-6, pp. 333-528, ISSN 0020-0956. Ristampe in volume: Roma, Collegio Ingegneri Ferroviari Italiani, 1955; Roma, Collegio Ingegneri Ferroviari Italiani-Ponte San Nicolò, Duegi, 2005, ISBN 88-900979-0-6
- Angelo Nascimbene, Aldo Riccardi, con la collaborazione di Federico Rigobello e Pierluigi Scoizzato, 1905-2005. Cento anni di locomotive a vapore delle Ferrovie dello Stato, in Tutto treno tema, (2005), n. 20, pp. 53-56, 59. ISSN 1124-4232.
