= Cylinder (locomotive) =

Power-producing element of a steam locomotive

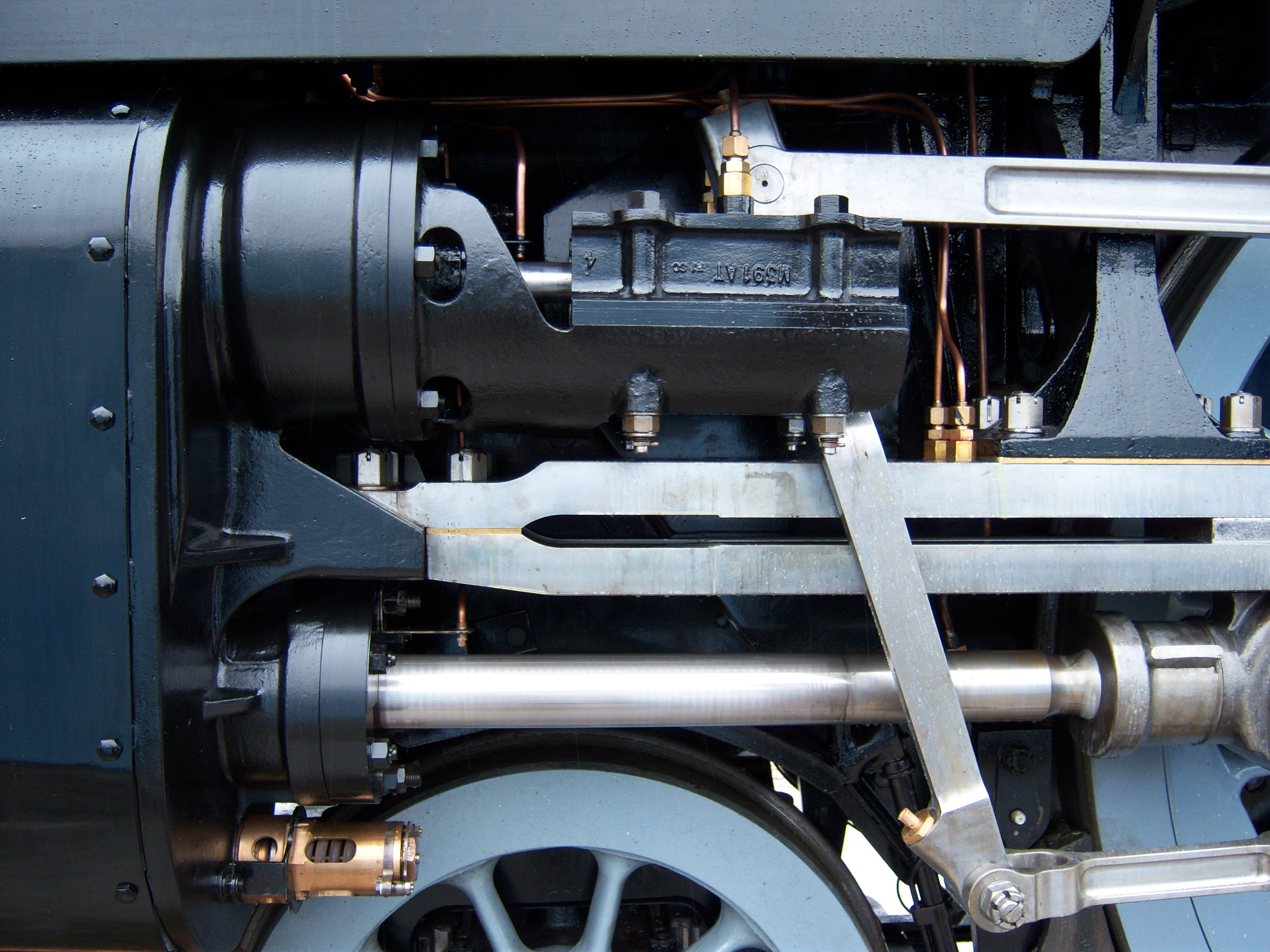
The 'motion' on the left-hand side of 60163 Tornado. The black casting to the left houses the cylinder, in which slides the piston; the piston rod is immediately above the wheel.

The cylinder is the power-producing element of the steam engine powering a steam locomotive. The cylinder is made pressure-tight with end covers and a piston; a valve distributes the steam to the ends of the cylinder. Cylinders were initially cast iron, but later made of steel. The cylinder casting includes other features such as (in the case of Stephenson's Rocket) valve ports and mounting feet. The last big American locomotives incorporated the cylinders as part of huge one-piece steel castings that were the main frame of the locomotive. Renewable wearing surfaces were needed inside the cylinders and provided by cast-iron bushings.

The way the valve controlled the steam entering and leaving the cylinder was known as steam distribution and shown by the shape of the indicator diagram. What happened to the steam inside the cylinder was assessed separately from what happened in the boiler and how much friction the moving machinery had to cope with. This assessment was known as "engine performance" or "cylinder performance". The cylinder performance, together with the boiler and machinery performance, established the efficiency of the complete locomotive. The pressure of the steam in the cylinder was measured as the piston moved and the power moving the piston was calculated and known as cylinder power. The forces produced in the cylinder moved the train but were also damaging to the structure which held the cylinders in place. Bolted joints came loose, cylinder castings and frames cracked and reduced the availability of the locomotive.

Cylinders may be arranged in several different ways.

== Early locomotives ==
On early locomotives, such as Puffing Billy, the cylinders were often set vertically and the motion was transmitted through beams, as in a beam engine.

== Direct drive ==
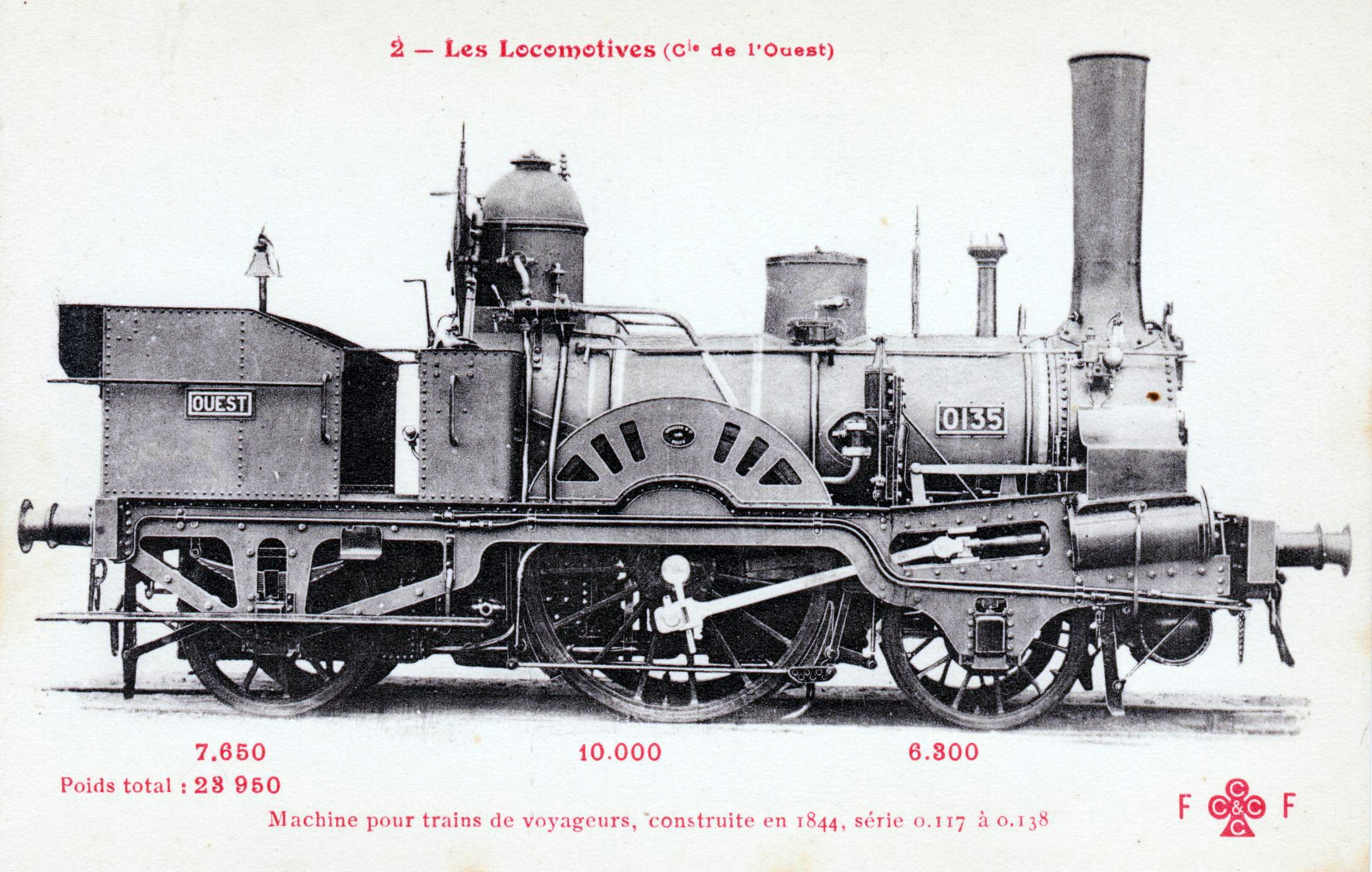
French 2-2-2 locomotive with nearly horizontal cylinders, 1844

The next stage, for example Stephenson's Rocket, was to drive the wheels directly from steeply inclined cylinders placed at the back of the locomotive. Direct drive became the standard arrangement, but the cylinders were moved to the front and placed either horizontal or nearly horizontal.

== Inside or outside cylinders ==
The front-mounted cylinders could be placed either inside (between the frames) or outside. Examples of each are:

- Inside cylinders, on the Planet locomotive
- Outside cylinders, on Stephenson's Rocket

In the 19th and early 20th centuries, inside cylinders were widely used in the United Kingdom, but outside cylinders were more common in Continental Europe and the United States due to their larger loading gauge. From about 1920, outside cylinders became more common in the UK but many inside-cylinder engines continued to be built. Inside cylinders give a more stable ride with less yaw or "nosing", but access for maintenance is more difficult. Some designers used inside cylinders for aesthetic reasons.

== Three or four cylinders ==
The demand for more power led to the development of engines with three cylinders (two outside and one inside) or four cylinders (two outside and two inside). Examples:

- Three: SR Class V, LNER Class A4, Merchant Navy class
- Four: LMS Princess Royal Class, LMS Coronation Class, GWR Castle Class

== Crank angles ==
On a two-cylinder engine the cranks, whether inside or outside, are set at 90 degrees. As the cylinders are double-acting (i.e. fed with steam alternately at each end) this gives four impulses per revolution and ensures that there are no dead centres.

On a three-cylinder engine, two arrangements are possible:

- cranks set to give six equally spaced impulses per revolution – the usual arrangement. If the three cylinder axes are parallel, the cranks will be 120 degrees apart, but if the centre cylinder does not drive the leading driving axle, it will probably be inclined (as on most US three-cylinder locomotives and on some of Gresley's three-cylinder locomotives in Great Britain), and the inside crank will be correspondingly shifted from 120 degrees. For a given tractive effort and adhesion factor, a three-cylinder locomotive of this design will be less prone to wheelslip when starting than a 2-cylinder locomotive.
- outside cranks set at 90 degrees, inside crank set at 135 degrees, giving six unequally spaced impulses per revolution. This arrangement was sometimes used on three-cylinder compound locomotives which used the outside (low pressure) cylinders for starting. This will give evenly spaced exhausts when the engine is working compound.

Two arrangements are also possible on a four-cylinder engine:

- all four cranks set at 90 degrees. With this arrangement the cylinders act in pairs, so there are four impulses per revolution, as with a two-cylinder engine. Most four-cylinder engines are of this type. It is cheaper and simpler to use only one set of valve gear on each side of the locomotive and to operate the second cylinder on that side by means of a rocking shaft from the first cylinder's valve spindle since the required valve events at the second cylinder are a mirror image of the first cylinder.
- pairs of cranks set at 90 degrees with the inside pair set at 45 degrees to the outside pair. This gives eight impulses per revolution. It increases weight and complexity, by requiring four sets of valve gear, but gives smoother torque and reduces the risk of slipping. This was relatively unusual in British practice but was used on the SR Lord Nelson class. Such locomotives are easily distinguished by their exhaust beats, which occur at twice the frequency of a normal 2- or 4-cylinder engine.

== Valves ==
The valve chests or steam chests which contain the slide valves or piston valves may be located in various positions.

=== Inside cylinders ===
If the cylinders are small, the valve chests may be located between the cylinders. For larger cylinders the valve chests are usually on top of the cylinders but, in early locomotives, they were sometimes underneath the cylinders.

=== Outside cylinders ===
The valve chests are usually on top of the cylinders but, in older locomotives, the valve chests were sometimes located alongside the cylinders and inserted through slots in the frames. This meant that, while the cylinders were outside, the valves were inside and could be driven by inside valve gear.

== Valve gear ==
There are many variations in the location of the valve gear. In British practice, inside valve gear is usually of the Stephenson type while outside valve gear is usually of the Walschaerts type. However, this is not a rigid rule and most types of valve gear are capable of being used either inside or outside. Joy valve gear was once popular, e.g. on the LNWR G Class.

=== Inside cylinders ===
On inside-cylinder engines the valve gear is nearly always inside (between the frames), e.g. LMS Fowler Class 3F.

On some locomotives the valve gear is located outside the frames, e.g. Italian State Railways Class 640.

=== Outside cylinders ===
On engines with outside cylinders there are three possible variations:

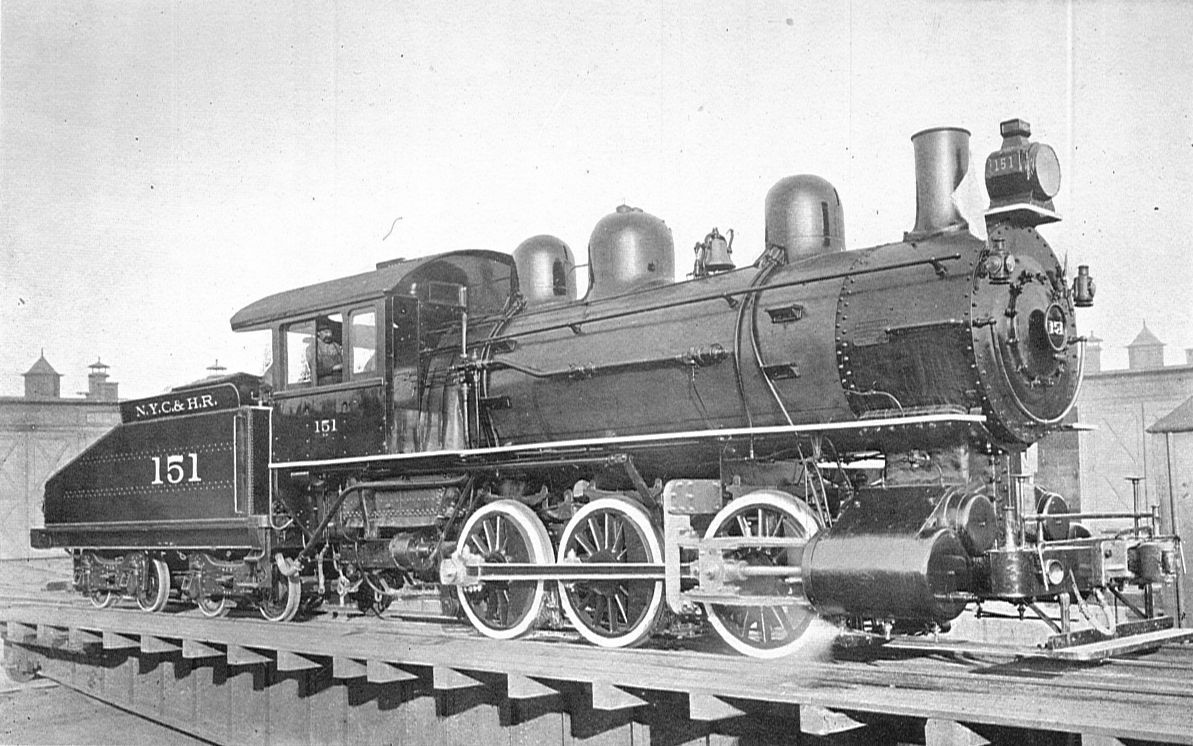
A NYC switching locomotive with outside valves driven by inside valve gear (Howden, Boys' Book of Locomotives, 1907)

- Inside valve gear driving inside valves, e.g. NER Class T2
- Inside valve gear driving outside valves through rocking shafts, e.g. GWR 4900 Class
- Outside valve gear driving outside valves, e.g. LSWR N15 Class

=== Three cylinders ===
There are three common variations:

- Three sets of valve gear (two outside, one inside), e.g. LNER Peppercorn Class A2
- Outside valve gear driving the outside valves. Inside valve driven by Gresley conjugated valve gear, e.g. LNER Class A1/A3
- Three sets of inside valve gear (all valves inside), e.g. NER Class T3

Fourth option common in Czechoslovak locomotive school is outside gear driving outside valves with a 3rd set of partially outside valve gear driven by coupled axle immediately behind main driver driving the inside valve gear via a rocking shaft eg. ČSD classes 477.0, 486.0, 498.0 and 498.1

=== Four cylinders ===
There are three common variations:

- Four sets of valve gear (two outside, two inside), e.g. SR Lord Nelson class
- Inside valve gear driving the inside valves directly and the outside valves via rocking shafts, e.g. GWR 4073 Class
- Outside valve gear driving the outside valves directly and the inside valves via rocking shafts, e.g. LMS Princess Coronation Class

== Other variations ==
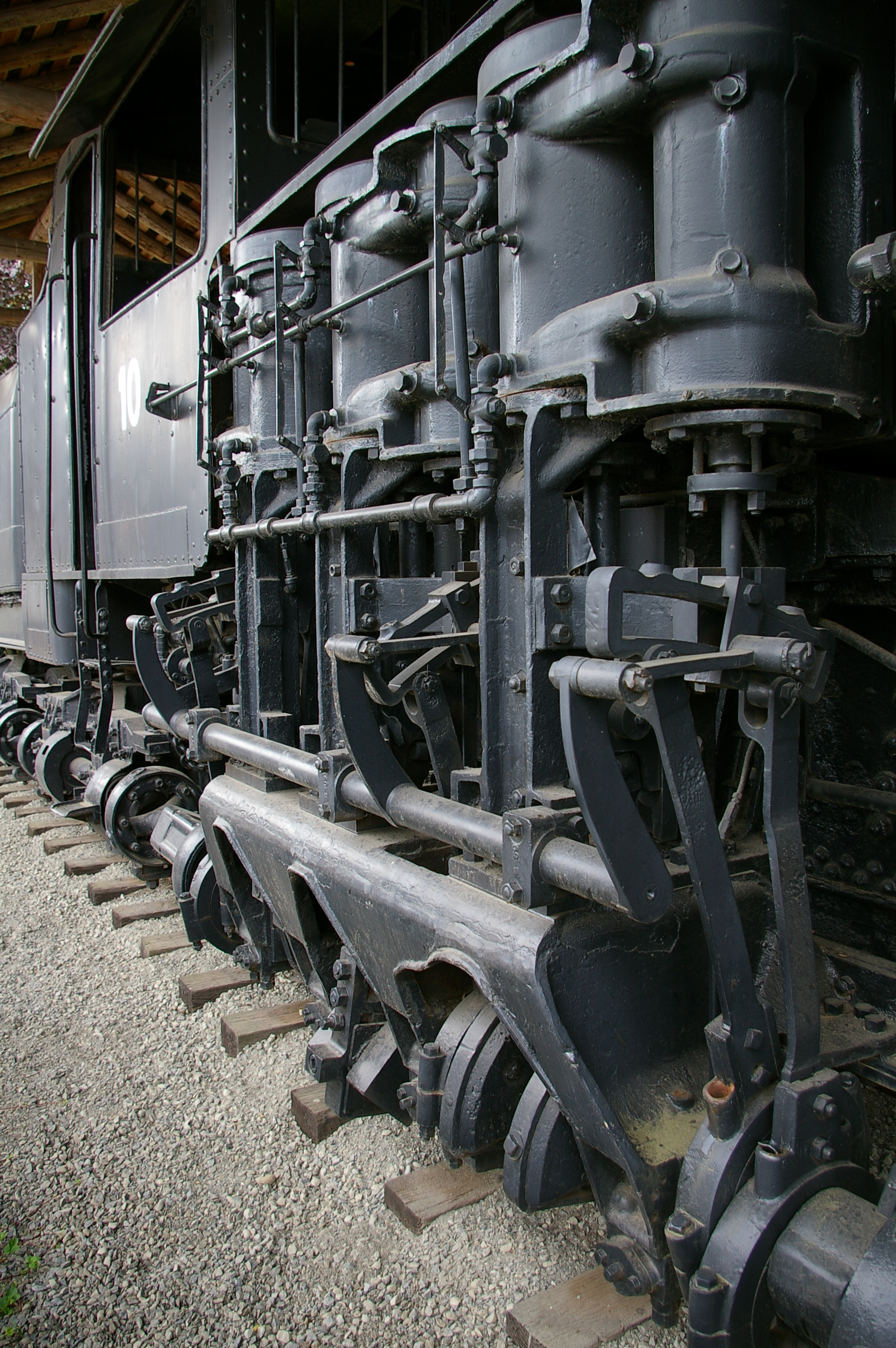
The cylinders on a Shay locomotive.

There are many other variations, e.g. geared steam locomotives which may have only one cylinder. The only conventional steam locomotive with one cylinder that is known is the Nielson One-Cylinder Locomotive.

== See also ==
- Cylinder bore
- Cylinder (engine)
- Cylinder stroke
- Hydrolock
- Steam locomotive components
