= OSE Class 220 =

Class of Greek diesel-electric locomotives

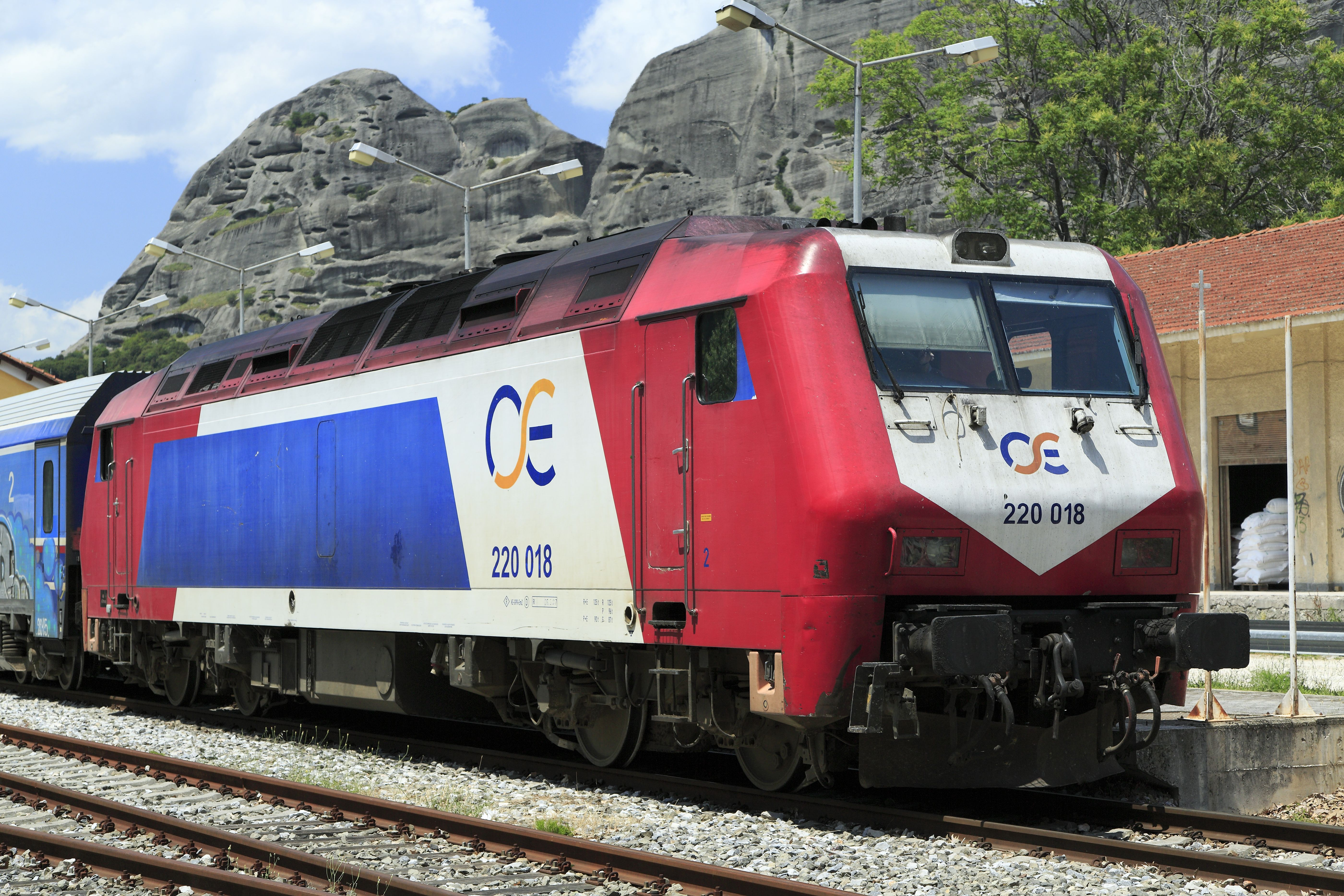
- OSE 220 018 at Kalambaka railway station, with the Rocks of Meteora in the background, 24 May 2016
Type and origin
- Power type: Diesel
- Builder: AdTranz (later Bombardier)
- Build date: 1997 (first batch); 2003-2004 (second batch)
Specifications
- Configuration
  - AAR: Bo′Bo′
- Gauge: 1,435 mm (4 ft 8 1/2 in) standard gauge
- Wheel diameter: 1,1 m
- Width: 3 m
- Height: 4,26 m
- Electric system/s: AC
- Transmission: Diesel-Electric
- Couplers: Buffers and Chain
Performance figures
- Maximum speed: 160 km / h
- Power output: 2100 kW
- Tractive effort: 260 kN
Career
- Operators: TrainOSE
- Numbers: 1st Batch: Α.471-Α.496 (later 220 001-220 026) 2nd Batch: 220 027-220 036

The OSE class 220, also known as DE2000 or Marlboro, due to the coloring of the front, reminiscent of the packaging colors of the homonymous tobacco industry, is a series of diesel-electric locomotives operated by TRAINOSE and RCLG and is part of the OSE fleet. It was built in 1998 at the ADTranz (and later Bombardier) factories in Kassel, Germany, as the A.471 series, but in 2003 OSE acquired another batch. The locomotives were put into operation by OSE after the completion of their construction.

In total, there are 36 such locomotives, numbered 220 001-220 036, of which the first 26 were originally numbered A.471-A.496. All of the locomotives were designed by the manufacturers while the final assembly was made in Oerlikon, Switzerland. They are designed for intercity trains, high-speed trains as well as freight trains.

They are based on the Octeon model of ADtranz, and feature similar features to the Italian E412, PKP EU43 and have the same engines (MTU 12V396TC13) with the AEG DE IC-2000N

Furthermore they have a nearly identical electric variant, the FS Class E405.

== Route ==
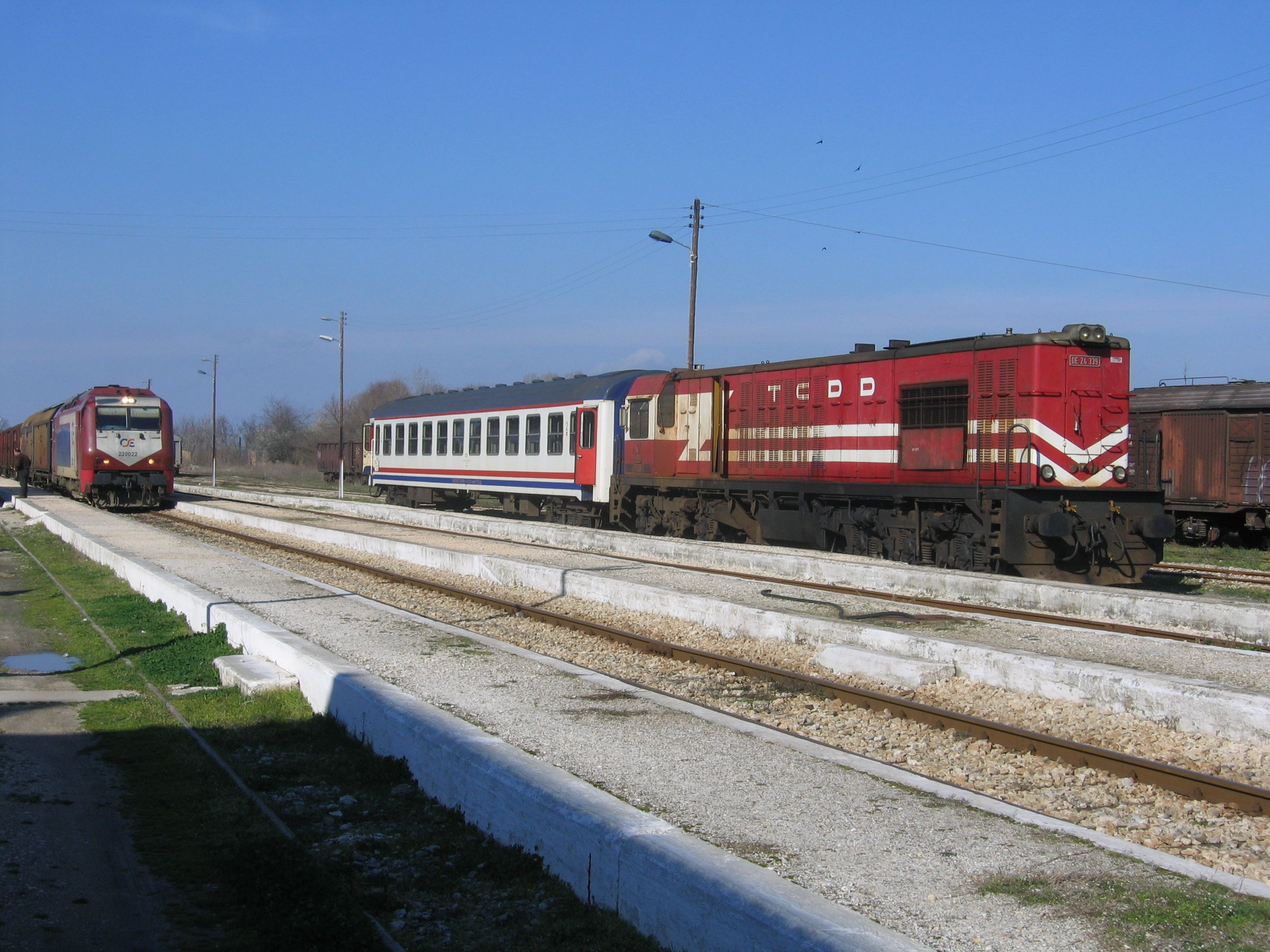
220 022 in Pithio in 2007, hauling a freight train along with a Turkish locomotive.

Class 220 serves long-distance express trains on the Piraeus-Thessaloniki line, in the section from Athens to Paleofarsalos, on trains 50, 51, 55, 56, 58, 59, 60 and 61, and in the section from Tithorea to Paleofarsalos, on trains 52 and 53, and in the Paleoparsalos-Kalampaka line.

== List ==
The following table summarizes the class:

List of DE2000s
Adtranz	33268	1997	DE 2000	Bo'Bo'-de	ΟΣΕ	220 001
Adtranz	33269	1997	DE 2000	Bo'Bo'-de	ΟΣΕ	220 002
Adtranz	33270	1997	DE 2000	Bo'Bo'-de	ΟΣΕ	220 003
Adtranz	33271	1997	DE 2000	Bo'Bo'-de	ΟΣΕ	220 004
Adtranz	33272	1997	DE 2000	Bo'Bo'-de	ΟΣΕ	220 005
Adtranz	33273	1997	DE 2000	Bo'Bo'-de	ΟΣΕ	220 006
Adtranz	33274	1997	DE 2000	Bo'Bo'-de	ΟΣΕ	220 007
Adtranz	33275	1997	DE 2000	Bo'Bo'-de	ΟΣΕ	220 008
Adtranz	33276	1997	DE 2000	Bo'Bo'-de	ΟΣΕ	220 009
Adtranz	33277	1997	DE 2000	Bo'Bo'-de	ΟΣΕ	220 010
Adtranz	33278	1997	DE 2000	Bo'Bo'-de	ΟΣΕ	220 011
Adtranz	33279	1997	DE 2000	Bo'Bo'-de	ΟΣΕ	A 482
Adtranz	33280	1997	DE 2000	Bo'Bo'-de	ΟΣΕ	220 013
Adtranz	33281	1997	DE 2000	Bo'Bo'-de	ΟΣΕ	220 014
Adtranz	33282	1997	DE 2000	Bo'Bo'-de	ΟΣΕ	220 015
Adtranz	33283	1997	DE 2000	Bo'Bo'-de	ΟΣΕ	220 016
Adtranz	33284	1997	DE 2000	Bo'Bo'-de	ΟΣΕ	220 017
Adtranz	33285	1997	DE 2000	Bo'Bo'-de	ΟΣΕ	220 018
Adtranz	33286	1997	DE 2000	Bo'Bo'-de	ΟΣΕ	220 019
Adtranz	33287	1997	DE 2000	Bo'Bo'-de	ΟΣΕ	220 020
Adtranz	33288	1997	DE 2000	Bo'Bo'-de	ΟΣΕ	220 021
Adtranz	33289	1997	DE 2000	Bo'Bo'-de	ΟΣΕ	220 022
Adtranz	33290	1997	DE 2000	Bo'Bo'-de	ΟΣΕ	220 023
Adtranz	33291	1997	DE 2000	Bo'Bo'-de	ΟΣΕ	220 024
Adtranz	33292	1997	DE 2000	Bo'Bo'-de	ΟΣΕ	220 025
Adtranz	33317	1997	DE 2000	Bo'Bo'-de	ΟΣΕ	220 026
Bombardier-ΜΕΤΚΑ	33798	2003	DE 2000	Bo'Bo'-de	ΟΣΕ	220 027
Bombardier-ΜΕΤΚΑ	33799	2003	DE 2000	Bo'Bo'-de	ΟΣΕ	220 028
Bombardier-ΜΕΤΚΑ	33800	2003	DE 2000	Bo'Bo'-de	ΟΣΕ	220 029
Bombardier-ΜΕΤΚΑ	33801	2003	DE 2000	Bo'Bo'-de	ΟΣΕ	220 030
Bombardier-ΜΕΤΚΑ	33802	2003	DE 2000	Bo'Bo'-de	ΟΣΕ	220 031
Bombardier-ΜΕΤΚΑ	33803	2004	DE 2000	Bo'Bo'-de	ΟΣΕ (Leased to RailCargo Goldair in 2019)	220 032
Bombardier-ΜΕΤΚΑ	33804	2004	DE 2000	Bo'Bo'-de	ΟΣΕ	220 033
Bombardier-ΜΕΤΚΑ	33805	2004	DE 2000	Bo'Bo'-de	ΟΣΕ	220 034
Bombardier-ΜΕΤΚΑ	33806	2004	DE 2000	Bo'Bo'-de	ΟΣΕ	220 035
Bombardier-ΜΕΤΚΑ	33807	2004	DE 2000	Bo'Bo'-de	ΟΣΕ	220 036

== History ==
=== 1990s: delivery to OSE ===
In 1998, OSE began to receive the Adtranz DE2000 diesel locomotives, which were ordered at a cost of DM 210 million in 1995. These dual-engine dual-cab locomotives were related to FS Class E.412 and EU43 series for PKP and were based on the Octeon platform. The MTU 12V396TC13 engine was virtually the same as that used in AEG/LEW-built InterCity DMUs (AEG DE IC-2000N) a decade ago, and this commonality was desirable; the engine pair delivered 2.1 MW (train heating could consume up to 500 KW of power from intermediate DC link as there was no separate head-end power generator).

The locomotives used steel from Poland's Pafawag, aluminium roof panels from Derby in the United Kingdom, AC motors and alternators from Adtranz Austria, while the bogies were Flexifloat (made in Kassel), also used in German InterCity Express. An interesting feature was that engines of these machines were "convertible" into clean 5.5 MW electric motors with a maximum speed of 200 km/h (120 mph) (engine's controller could already accommodate the highest speed and horsepower). They were numbered A.471 to A.496.

=== 2000s ===
Later, an order for ten more locomotives (this time, in meter gauge and with 6 axles) for the Peloponnese network was converted to an order for ten normal 4-axle range from Bombardier. The second batch was delivered in 2003–2004. In the same year, the gradual renovation of the older units began.

== Appearance ==
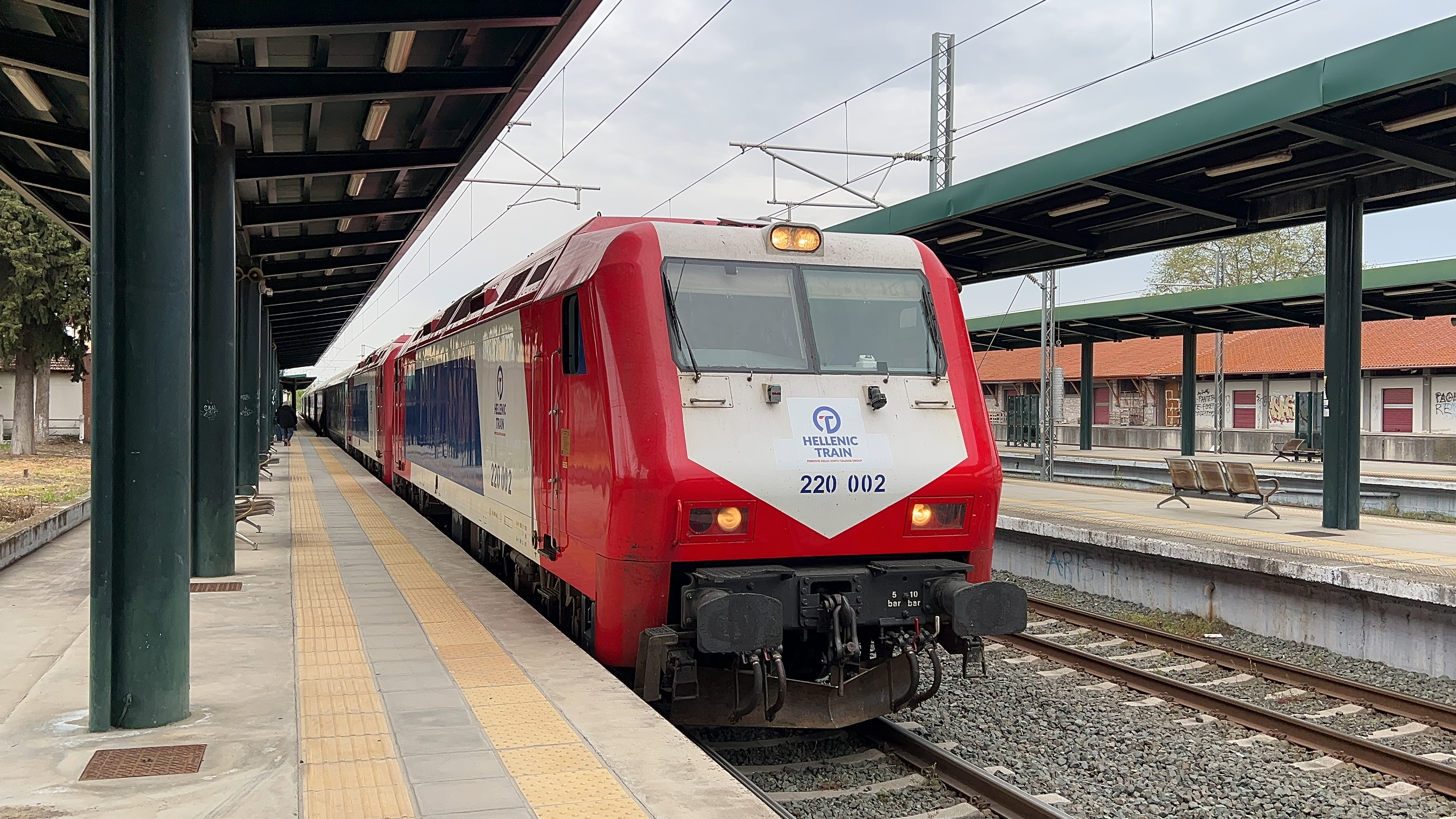
ADtranz DE2000 (220 002) with Hellenic Train logos paired with (220 013) at Katerni railway station, April 2026

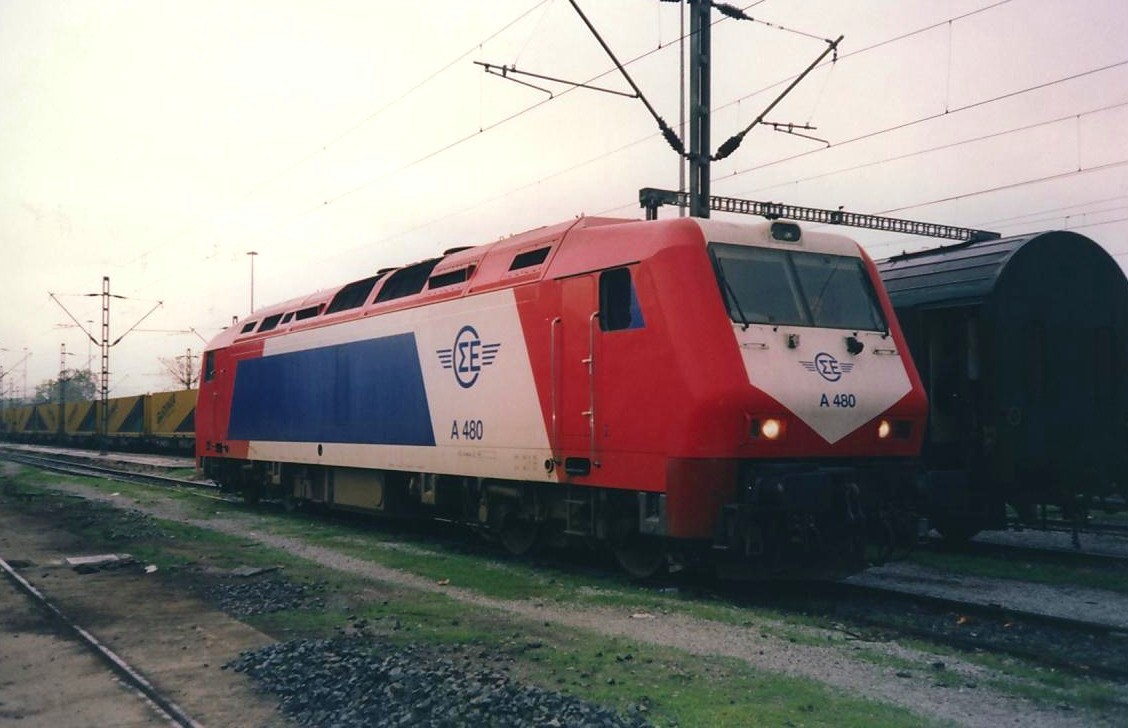
A.480 (now 220 010) at the Old Railway Station of Thessaloniki

Colour scheme of the diesel-electric locomotives consists of a blue trapezoid within a white trapezoid, with cabs painted red and cab fronts having large white polygons (giving rise to the nickname "Marlboro," from resemblance to the well-known brand of cigarettes).

== Sources ==
- Transport/Trains/Locomotives
- Verelis: Presentation of the new OSE trains
