= EU43 (disambiguation) =

EU43 may refer to:

- a class of electric multisystem locomotives similar to FS Class E412 ordered by the Polish State but today used in Italy
- a class of Bombardier TRAXX electric multisystem locomotives used by Polish State Railways
