= Metro M1 =

Metro M1 may refer to:

- Bucharest Metro Line M1
- M1 (Copenhagen)
- M1 (Istanbul Metro)
- Metro M1 (Prague)
- Milan Metro Line 1
