= E412 =

E412 may refer to:

- Guar gum, a food additive
- FS class E412, a powerful electric locomotive in use in Italy
