= 520 class =

520 class or Class 520 may refer to:

- OSE class 520, diesel multiple units
- South Australian Railways 520 class, 4-8-4 steam locomotives
