= FS Class E.405 =

Electric locomotive class

Class E.405
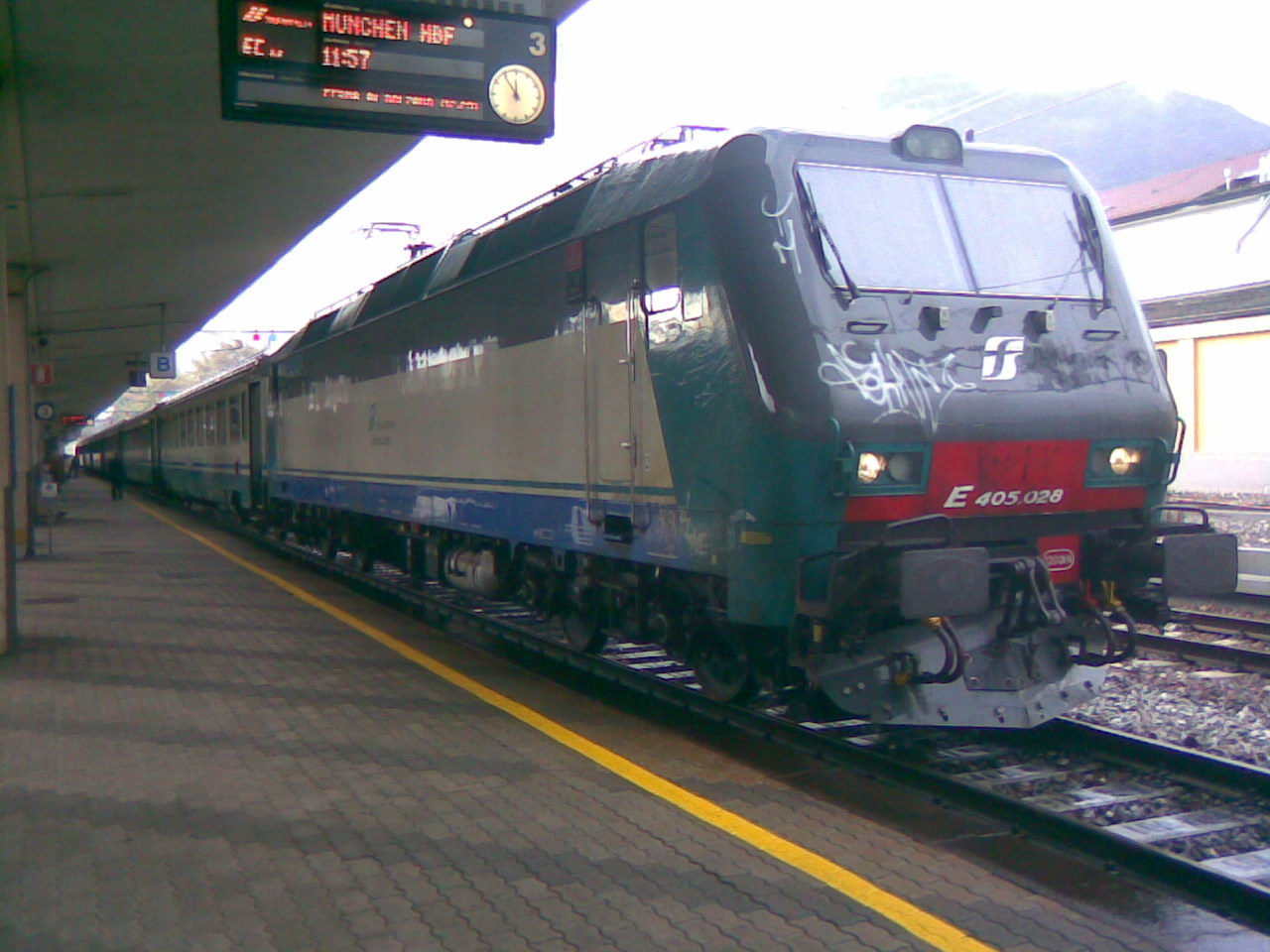
Type and origin
- Power type: electric
- Builder: Bombardier (former AdTranz)
- Build date: 1998-2004
- Total produced: 42
Specifications
- Configuration
  - UIC: Bo′Bo′
- Gauge: 1,435 mm (4 ft 8 1/2 in) standard gauge
- Driver dia.: 1.110 m (43.70 in)
- Wheelbase: 11.400 m (37 ft 4 7/8 in)
- Length: 19.400 m (63 ft 7 3/4 in)
- Adhesive weight: 82 t (81 long tons; 90 short tons)
- Loco weight: 82 t (81 long tons; 90 short tons)
- Electric system/s: 3,000 V DC Catenary
- Current pickup: Pantograph
- Traction motors: Three-phase
Performance figures
- Maximum speed: 160 km/h (99 mph)
- Power output: 6,000 kW (8,000 hp)
- Tractive effort: 250 kN (56,000 lb_{f})
Career
- Operators: FS
- First run: 2003

The FS Class E.405 is a class of electric locomotive built in 42 units by ADTranz (now Bombardier Transportation Italy) originally for the Polish State Railways (PKP), but later acquired by Trenitalia Italian state railways.

== History ==
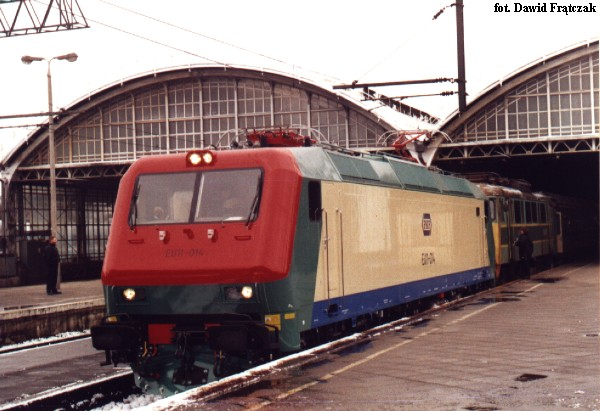
EU11-014 at Wrocław Główny railway station in the late-1990s.

The locomotives were originally commissioned by PKP in 1996 and the units were assembled in Poland at Wrocław Pafawag's plant, designated as PKP Class EU11 (manufacturer's designation: Adtranz-Pafawag 113E). After a short operational stint of 8 locomotives on the Warsaw-Berlin line, they were sold to Italy's Ferrovie dello Stato (FS), which later rechristened them as E.405 in May 2003.

They are a development of the similar E.412, which are however designed for international goods transport and have polycurrent motor equipment (E.405 can operate only on 3000 V direct current lines). They have a maximum speed of 200 km/h (120 mph) with trains up to 600 t (590 long tons; 660 short tons), although in Italy they can be used only up to 160 km/h (99 mph) (140 km/h or 87 mph for goods trains). Thanks to their relatively large initial tractive effort (250 kN or 56,000 lb_{f}), they can haul both heavy goods and fast passenger trains.

They are mainly in service on the Brenner Line for goods transport.
