= Rolf Eckrodt =

German automotive engineer and executive (1942–2019)

Rolf Eckrodt (25 June 1942 – 2 May 2019) was a German automotive engineer and executive, who started his career with Daimler-Benz in 1966 and was CEO of the Mitsubishi Motors from 2001 to 2005. As of May 2019, he is the only non-Japanese person who has held the position.

== Career ==
Eckrodt spent most of his professional life in the automotive industry, but he also spent 6 years as president and later Chairman of Adtranz, an ABB / DaimlerChrysler joint venture in the railway rolling stock and signalling business areas.

After the sale of Adtranz to Bombardier, Eckrodt took an executive position at Mitsubishi Motors in Japan. When DaimlerChrysler decided to sell their shares in Mitsubishi Motors in November 2005, Eckrodt stepped down and retired after 38 years in the auto industry.

From 2008 until 2013 Eckrodt was the chairman of the Board of the Frank Latzer Group and from 2010 until 2013 of Leclanche SA.
