= Metro M1 (Prague) =

Czech metro train

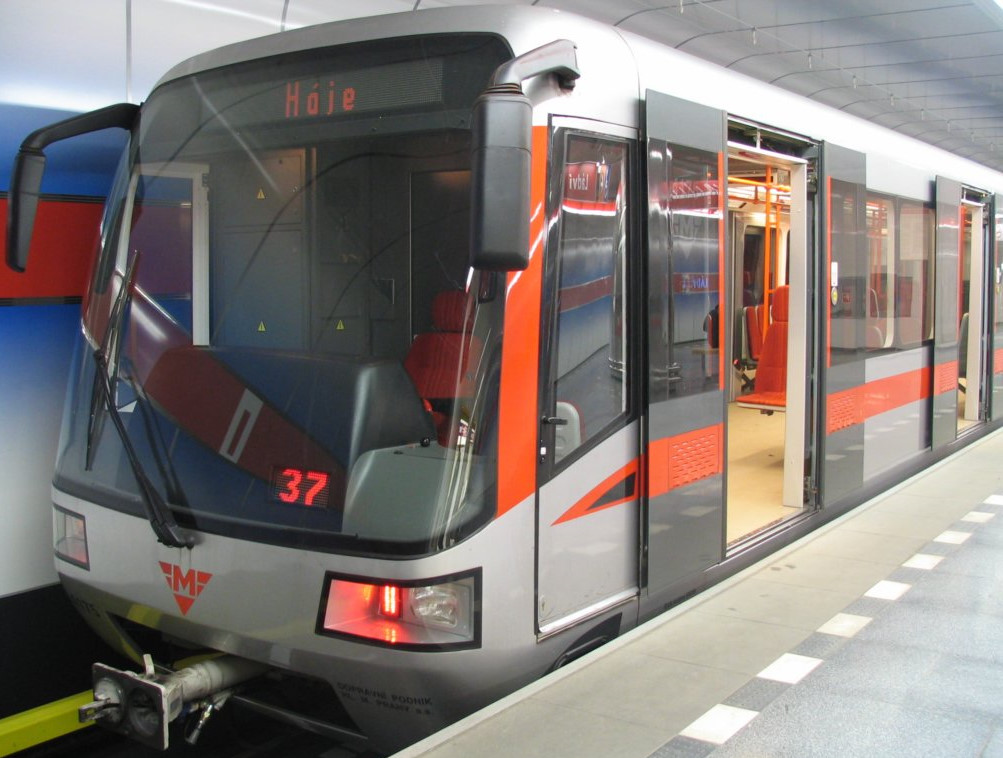
- Metro M1 at terminal station

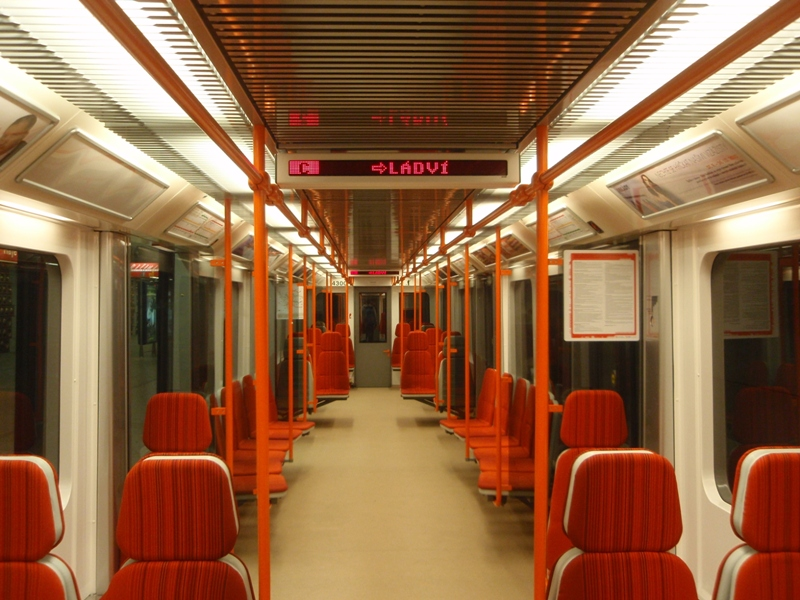
- Stock type: DC electric multiple unit
- In service: 2000 - present
- Manufacturers: ČKD/Siemens, Adtranz
- Designers: Patrik Kotas, Antonín Honzík
- Replaced: 81-71, 81-71M
- Constructed: 1998 - 2011
- Entered service: 27 January 2000
- Number built: 53 5-car trains
- Fleet numbers: 4100–4199
- Capacity: 1464
- Operator: Prague Public Transit Company
- Depot: Kačerov
- Line served: Line C

Specifications
- Train length: 96.66 m (317 ft 1 1/2 in)
- Car length: 19,521 mm (64 ft 9/16 in) (end cars); 19,206 mm (63 ft 1/8 in) (intermediate cars)
- Width: 2,712 mm (8 ft 10 3/4 in)
- Height: 3.8 m (12 ft 5 5/8 in)
- Floor height: 1.15 m (3 ft 9 1/4 in)
- Platform height: 1.1 m (3 ft 7 5/16 in)
- Doors: 4 per side
- Wheelbase: 2,100 mm (6 ft 10 11/16 in)
- Maximum speed: 90 km/h (56 mph) (design); 80 km/h (50 mph) (Prague service); 70 km/h (43 mph) (Maracaibo service)
- Weight: 140 t (140 long tons; 150 short tons) (unladen); 250 t (250 long tons; 280 short tons) (crush load)
- Traction system: Siemens IGBT–VVVF
- Traction motors: 12–20 × Siemens 160 kW (210 hp) asynchronous 3-phase AC
- Power output: 3,200 kW (4,300 hp) (Prague); 1,920 kW (2,570 hp) (Maracaibo)
- Gear ratio: 6.47 : 1
- Acceleration: 1.4 m/s^{2} (4.6 ft/s^{2})
- Electric systems: 750 V DC (nominal) from under-running third rail (Prague); 750 V DC (nominal) from overhead catenary (Maracaibo)
- UIC classification: Bo′Bo′+Bo′Bo′(+Bo′Bo′+Bo′Bo′)+Bo′Bo′
- Track gauge: 1,435 mm (4 ft 8 1/2 in) standard gauge

Notes/references
- Cited from

Metro M1 is a Czech type of metro train, which is used on line C of the Prague Metro. These Metro trains were made by the companies ČKD, Siemens and ADTranz mainly from 2000 to 2003 and were developed especially for Prague. These metro trains replaced the metro 81-71M.

== Description ==
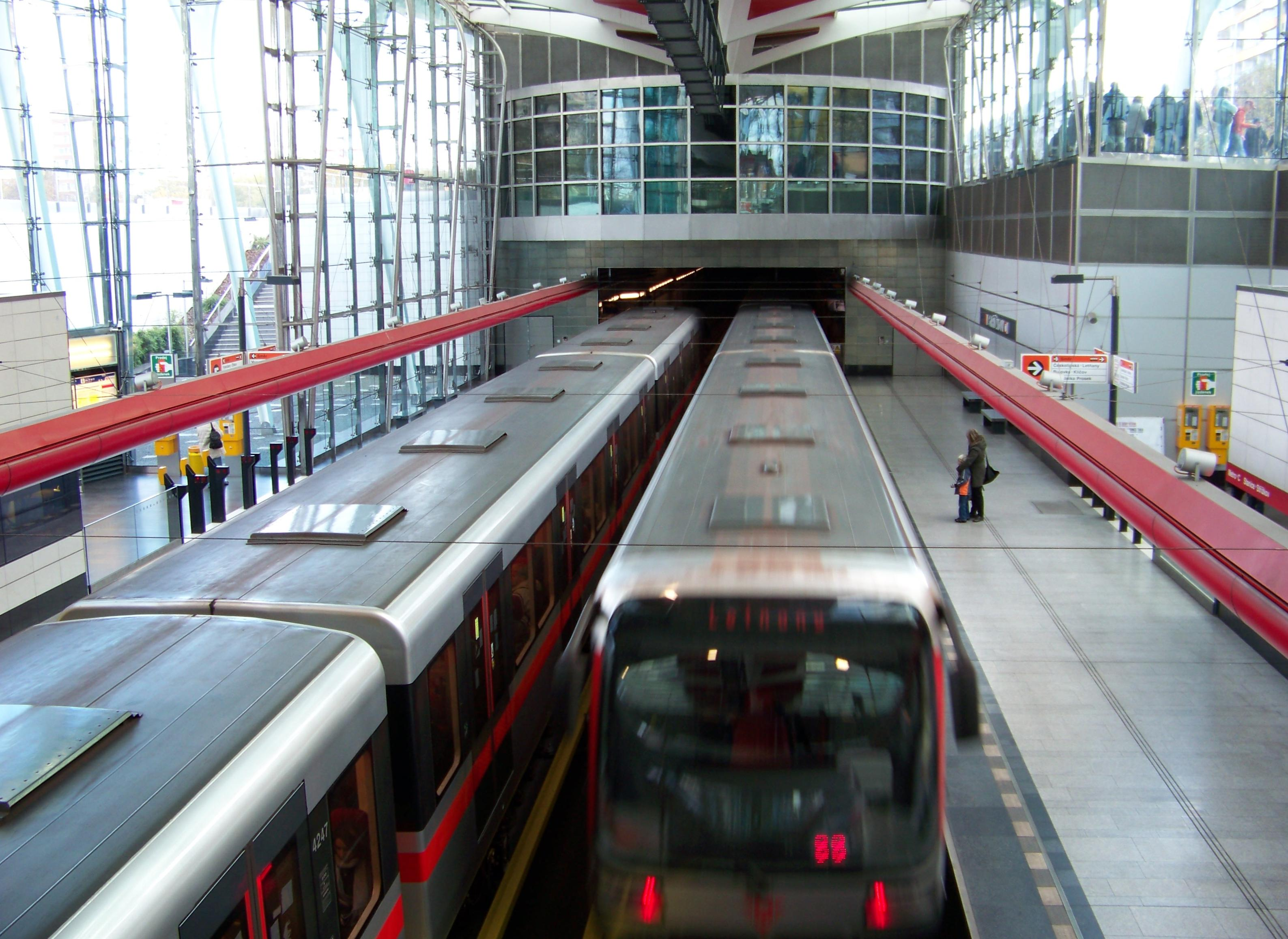
Metro M1, station Střížkov on line C

The Metro M1 train consists of five units. Because of differences in the technical equipment of each car, the train is indivisible. It is driven by asynchronous motors with microprocessor control, in contrast to the motors used in Soviet trains. The train has a central control system that allows the train crew, data collection and evaluation, including diagnostics. Maximum capacity of one car is 48 seats (40 for the first and last car) for sitting and 252 standing places (242 for the first and last car).

The metro runs automatically, the driver only ensures the door opening and closing and reporting of stations. The metro is checked from the central dispatching of the Prague metro. The maximum speed of Metro M1 is 90 km/h (56 mph), but the maximum speed in operation is reduced to 80 km/h (50 mph) Train service life is estimated at thirty years. The designer of the trains is Ing. Arch. Patrik Kotas. The width of the door is 160 centimetres (5 ft 3 in), the height from floor to ceiling is 210 centimetres (6 ft 11 in).

== M1 in Prague ==
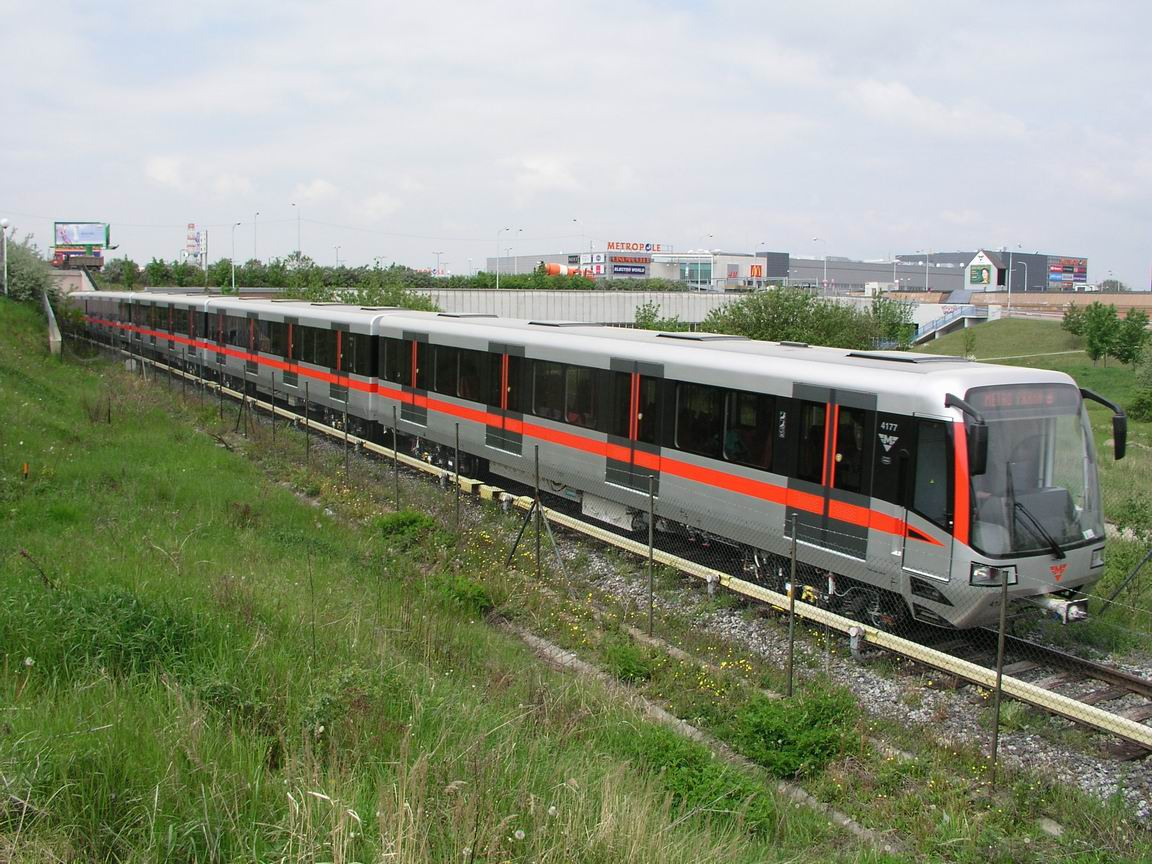
Metro M1 on a test track in 2000

Metro M1 has been developed as a light rail of the new millennium. In 1995, a contract for the delivery of M1 trains was signed between the companies Siemens, ADTranz, ČKD and Prague Transport Company (DPP). The first train appeared in Prague in July 1998 within test operation. Main serial production took place between 2000 and 2003. Since 2003, this type is the only train in use on line C. In 2003, 40 units operated on this line. Further deliveries of M1 took place in response to the extension of line C in 2004 and 2008. These trains were made only by Siemens, without ČKD and ADTranz.

Currently, there are 53 M1 trains in Prague, further deliveries are not planned. In the morning rush hour 42 metro trains are in operation, the minimum interval between 2 trains is 90 seconds.

== M1 in Maracaibo ==
As well as in Prague, for which it was specially developed, the M1 also runs in Maracaibo, Venezuela. In Maracaibo, trains only have three cars and green-white paint, and use overhead lines instead of third rail.

== Gallery ==
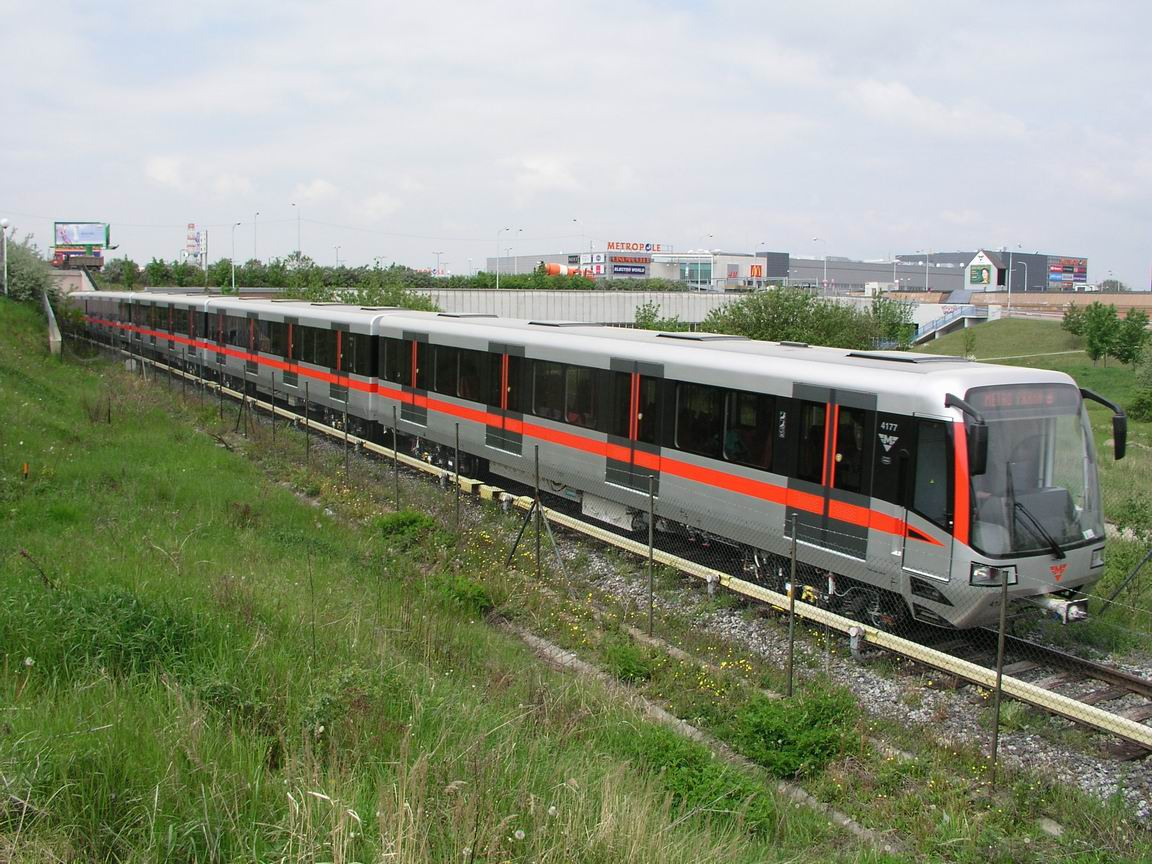
Metro M1 on a test track in 2000

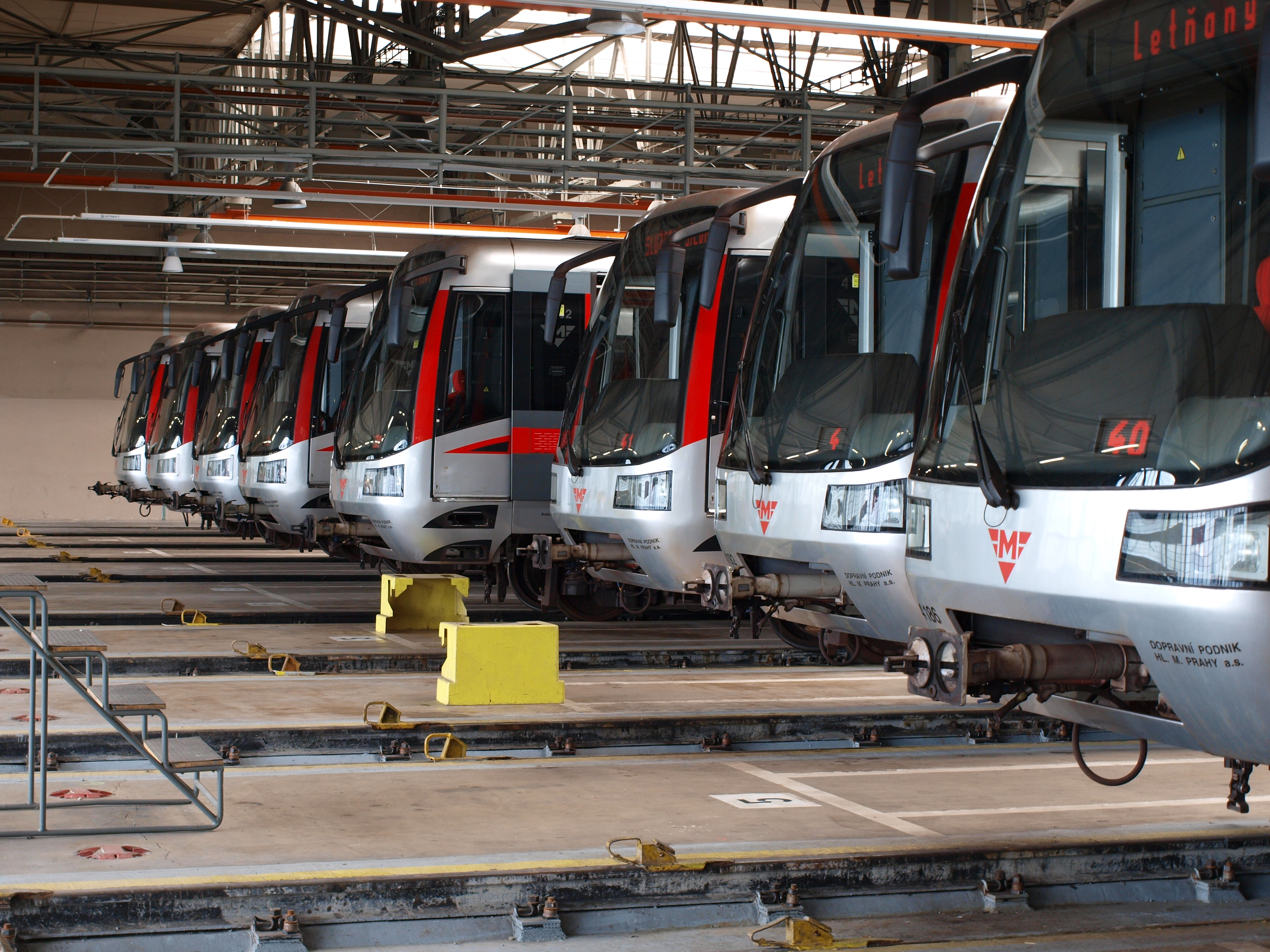
Metro M1 trains in Depo Kačerov

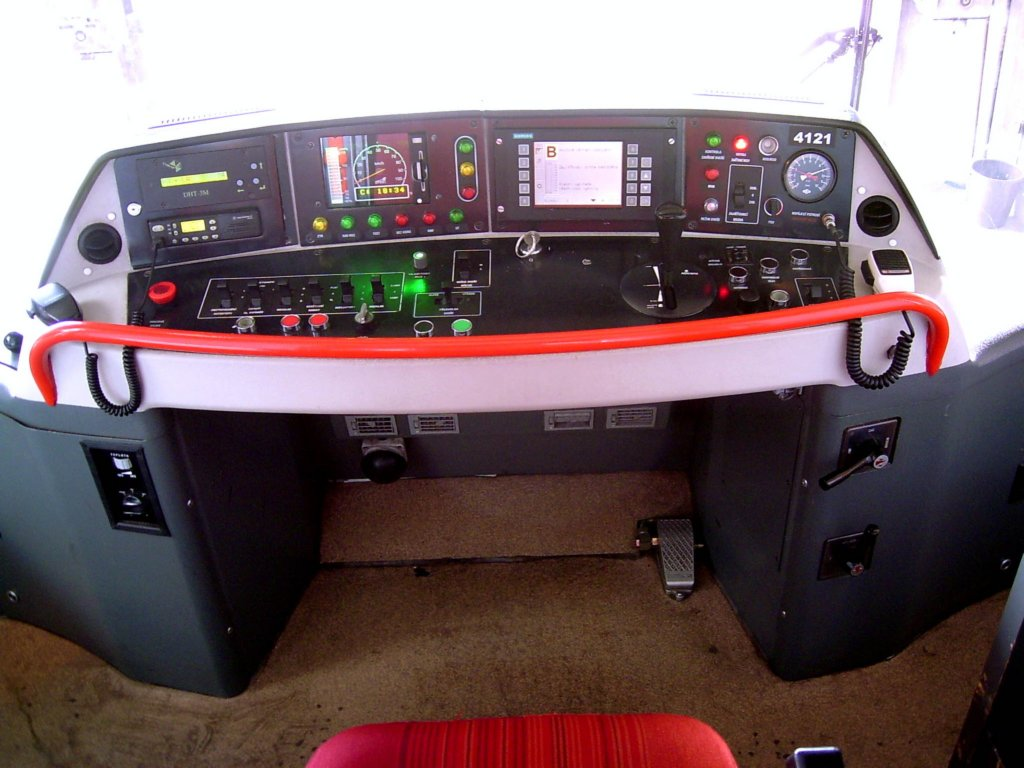
M1 metro - cabin of the driver

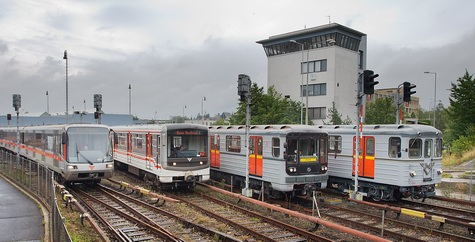
From left: Metro M1, 81-71M, 81-71 and Ečs (at present, in operation Metro M1 and 81-71M)

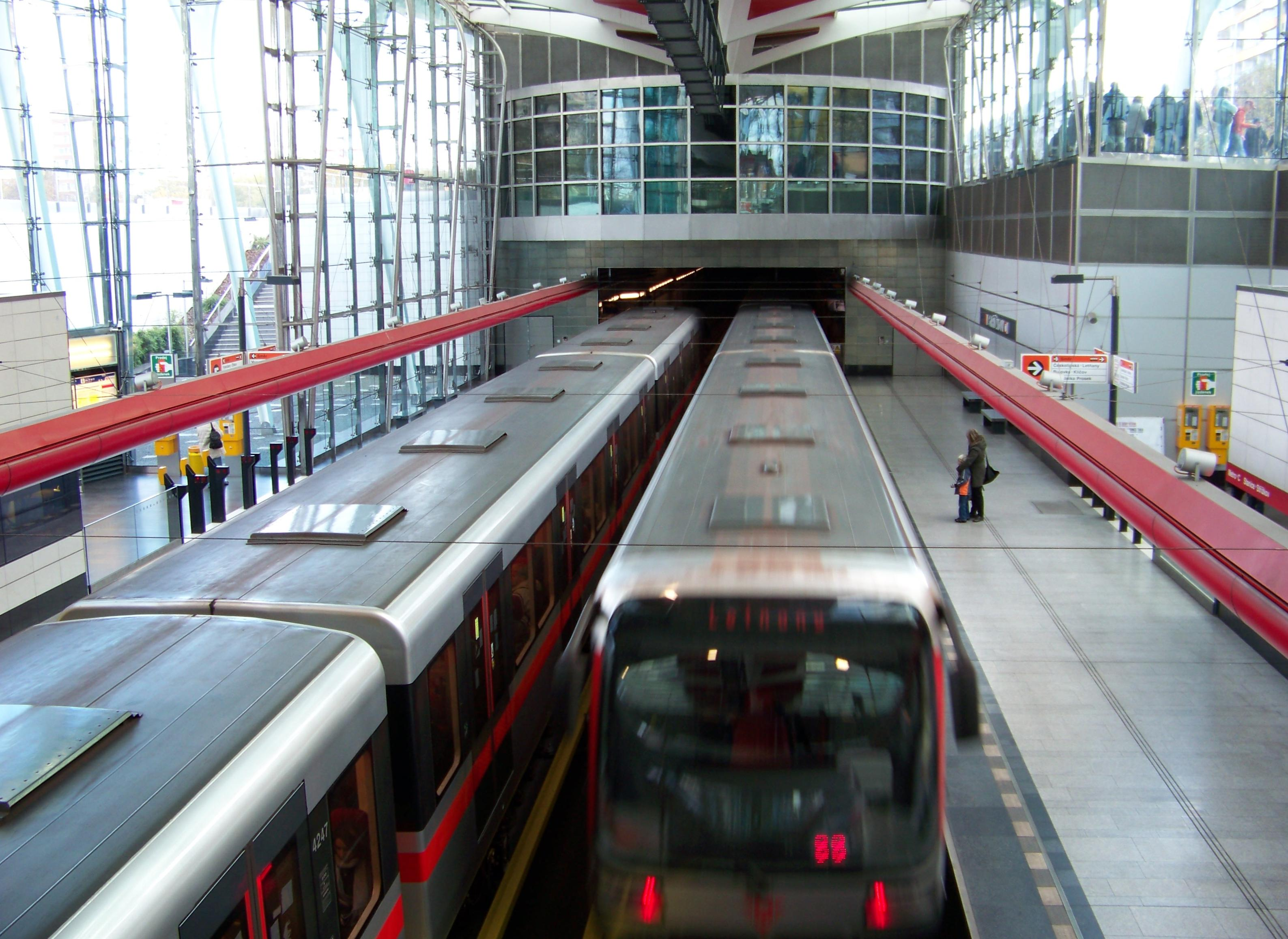
Metro M1, Střížkov station on line C

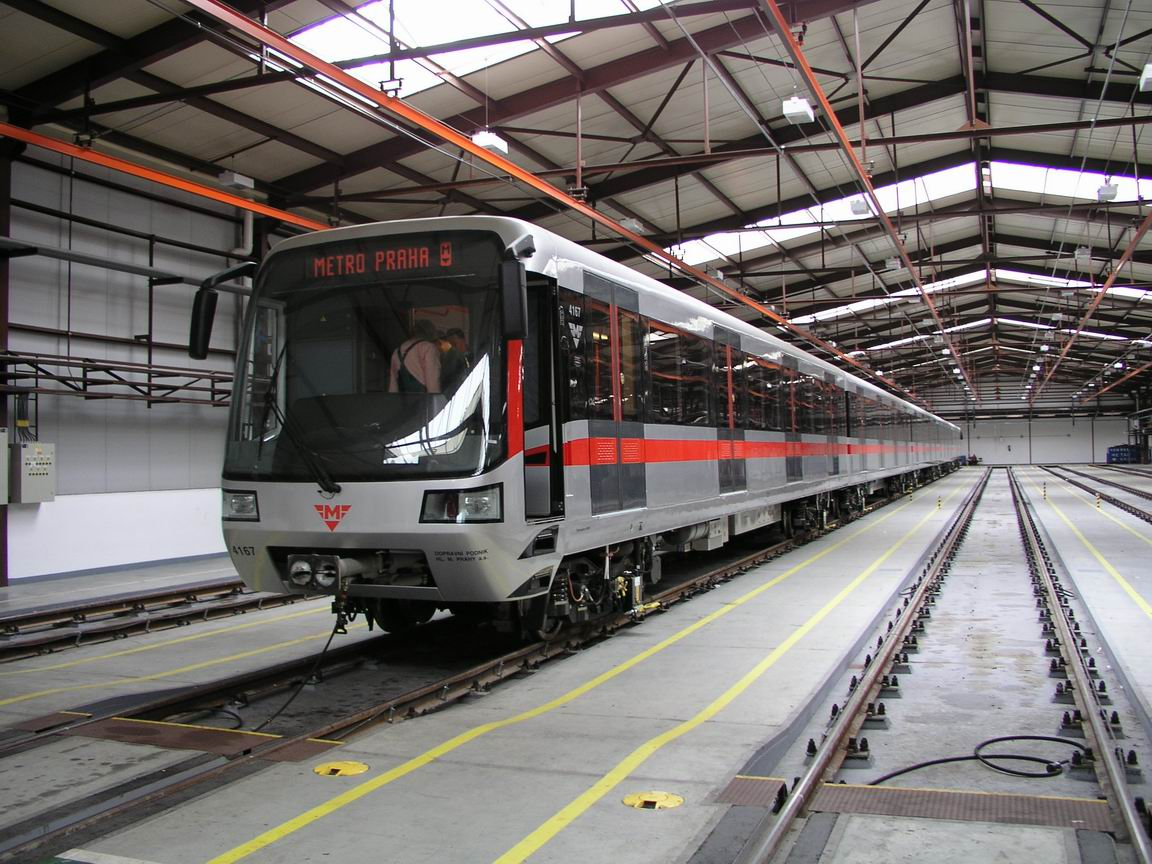
Metro M1 in Depo Zličín

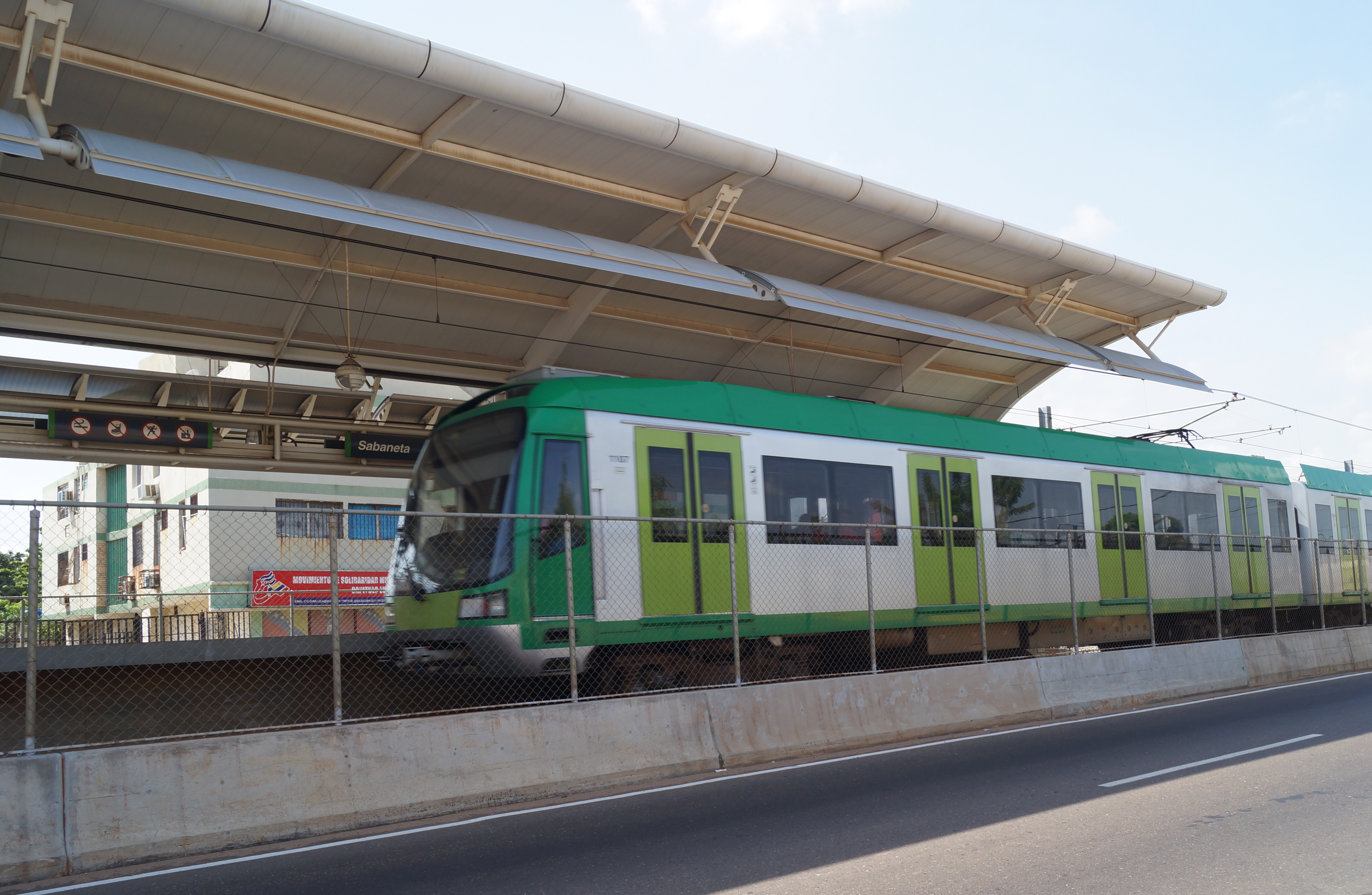
Metro M1 in Maracaibo, Venezuela
