= OSE class 520 =

OSE class 520 (ex 601/651)
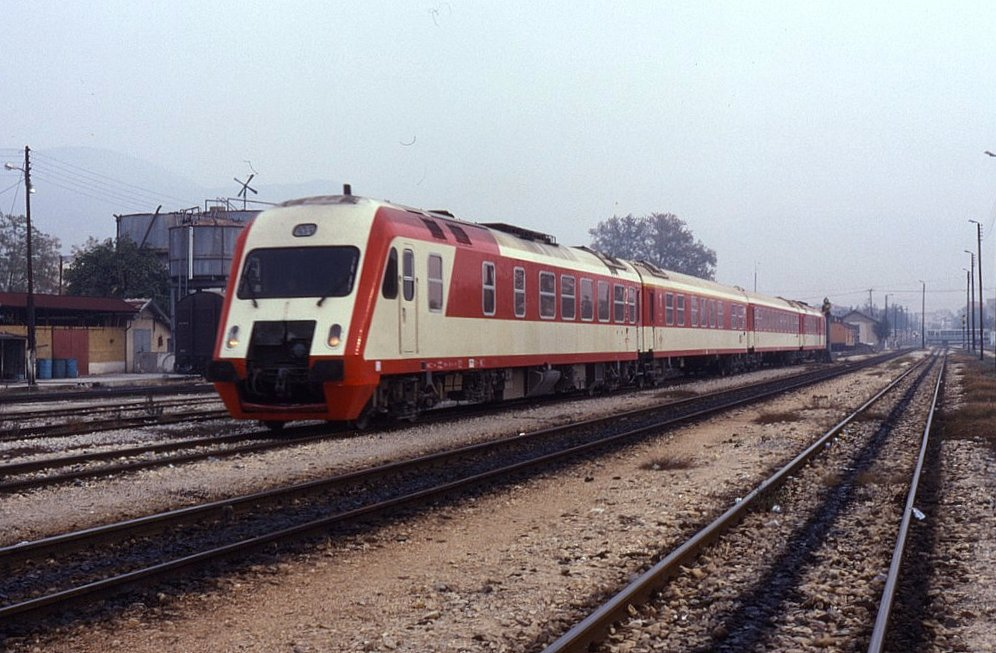
- 520 class trainset in 1992
Type and origin
- Build date: 1989/1995
Specifications
- Gauge: 1,435 mm (4 ft 8 1/2 in)
- Power supply: Diesel
- Transmission: Diesel electric
Performance figures
- Maximum speed: 165 km/h
- Power output: 2100 kW
Career
- Operators: Hellenic Train
- Numbers: 520 101-520 412, 520 151-520 558

The TRAINOSE Class 520, also known as the AEG DE IC-2000N, is the oldest class of trainsets operated by TRAINOSE. They are diesel-powered, and can be seen operating in DMU-5 or DMU-4 configurations. They were built in 1989 and 1995 as the class 601 and 651, respectively, from the cooperation of West Germany's AEG and East Germany's LEW, and for about two decades they were the spearhead of the InterCity services. Sometimes, DMU-4 trains can be seen operating coupled with another unit to increase capacity. In total, there are 20 such trainsets, 12 DMU-4 and 8 DMU-5.

The DMU-4 sets are numbered from 520 101 to 520 412, while the DMU-5's from 520 151 to 520 558. The first batch of trainsets can accommodate up to 180 seated passengers, 36 in the first class and 144 in the second, while the second batch can accommodate up to 214, 75 in the first class and 144 in the second. They are equipped with MTU diesel engines which produce a combined power of 2100 kW (1000 x 2 diesel motors MTU 12V396TC13 with supercharger) allowing the class 520 to reach speeds of up to 165 km/h.

== Route ==
The AEG DE IC-2000N's currently operate long-distance services on the Thessaloniki-Alexandroupolis and Alexandroupoli-Ormenio routes and local trains on the Alexandroupolis-Svilengrad line.

== History ==
=== 1980s: Beginning ===
In 1986, OSE, in the context of upgrading the fleet, proceeded to order new trainsets of high quality and specification. Under contract 5701/1986, 12 AEG (of FRG) / LEW (of GDR) trainsets were ordered which consisted of four coaches. Later vehicles were manufactured by the East German Bautzen.

As a product of co-operation between the (then) two German states, new trainsets brought many innovations to the greek rolling stock fleet. The new 12-cylinder MTU 396 TC 13 engines deliver 1450 horsepower each, thanks to the 1800 rounds per minute turbocharger. To meet the energy consumption of each train, 2 energy generation sets, consisting of a 250-horsepower MAN diesel engine were installed to provide power to all wagons. The trains are also equipped with a SIBAS control system, ergonomically controlled panoramic glass windows and air conditioning. Each diesel engine rotates a generator that supplies current to 2 electric motors under every carriage, which then transmit the movement to their respective bogeys with Cardan transmission bridges. The axle configuration is B0, B0 + 2,2 + 2,2 + B0, B0.

The interior of the trains was the most luxurious of the Greek railways at the time of their introduction. The seats, which are well padded and comfortable, are divided into 144 B class and 36 A class sitting spaces. There is also a canteen and a kitchen for the meal preparation in the intermediate vehicle between the A and B class wagons. At-Seat service was also available for some time in a manner similar to that of air travel, while the air conditioning system offered levels of comfort never experienced before on a Greek train. Finally, all wagons are well insulated against external noise and are equipped with an announcement system. The Class 520 was mainly used in long-distance services across the standard gauge railway network, specifically, on routes with high demand, such as the (Piraeus) Athens-Thessaloniki-Alexandroupolis, Athens-Volos, Athens-Kalampaka and Athens-Kozani intercity routes.

=== 90s-today ===
In 1993, OSE, in view of the small capacity of the trains, ordered additional trainsets. New trainsets are manufactured by AEG in Hennigsdorf. Differences are insignificant at both mechanical and operational levels. The addition of an intermediate coach with 54 A-seat seats gives the opportunity to create a space for the vehicle with a canteen. Thus, the new trains feature 144 class B seats, 75 class A seats and 12 unnamed seats as a dining room.

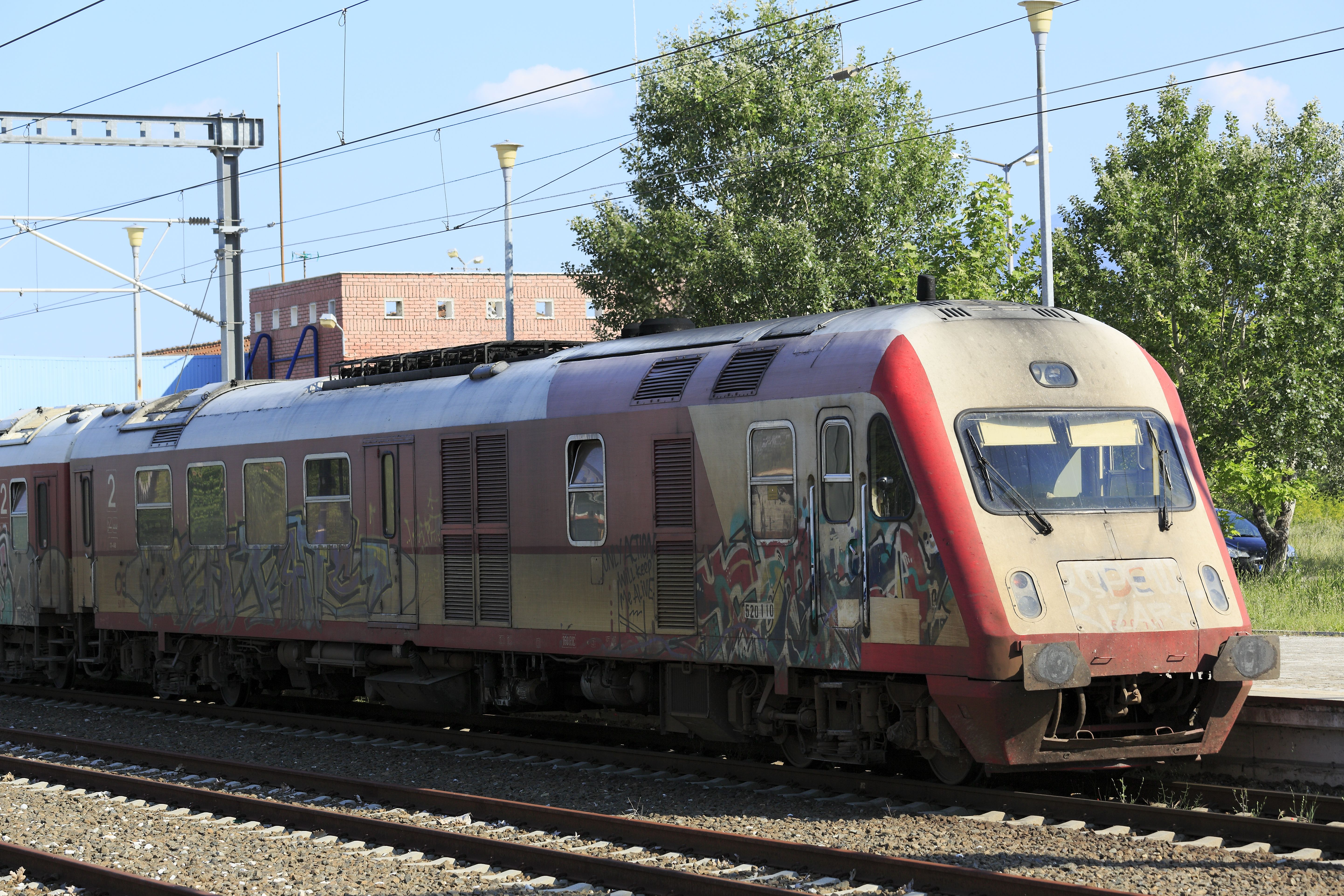
OSE Class 520 in 2016

Since 2004 and the launching of new passenger coaches on these routes, their role has been gradually reduced. In 2007 and with the departure of the Siemens Desiro Classic from the Greek network, they were launched on the new Athens-Corinth-Kiato dual line. During the following years, they were demoted on local and regional routes on the Athens-Halkida, Athens-Lianokladi-Stylida, Athens-Larissa, Thessaloniki-Larisa-Kalampaka and Larissa-Volos routes.

Until 2011, 520 class continued to run InterCity and ICE on the Thessaloniki-Athens route as well as various other types of service across the country. Following the OSE reorganization program, they were limited to local Athens-Lianocladi, Thessaloniki-Florina, Thessaloniki-Kalampaka and Alexandroupolis-Dikaia routes. From 2011, they only perform the local Athens-Lianocladi and Athens-Larissa and remain only in double couling of fast routes on the axis. These routes will cease to be secured by trainsets since August of that year to be reset in January 2017 on train 58/51. From 2012 they are re-established in the connection between Thessaloniki and Florina. Apart from a short return to InterCity Thessaloniki-Athens in the first half of 2017, today they are operating the routes listed in the section "Route"

In July 2017, the trainsets will carry out the last high-speed route on the Athens-Thessaloniki axis and will permanently abandon their 28-year seat, the Agios Ioannis Rentis Depot, to be transported to the Thessaloniki Depot where they continue to serve in Northern Greece.

== Livery ==
Trainset's coloring consists of a large red horizontal stripe on a white / cream color that covers most of the coaches.

== Bibliography ==
- Greek magazine "Σιδηροτροχια", issue 19, p:32-34 (1999)
- "Συλλογος Φιλων του Σιδηροδρομου: Οι Ελληνικοί Σιδηροδρομοι η διαδρομη τους απο το 1869 εως σήμερα" (The Greek Railways, their route from 1869 to date), σελ: 166-167, Εκδόσεις Μίλητος
