= FS Class E.412 =

FS class E.412
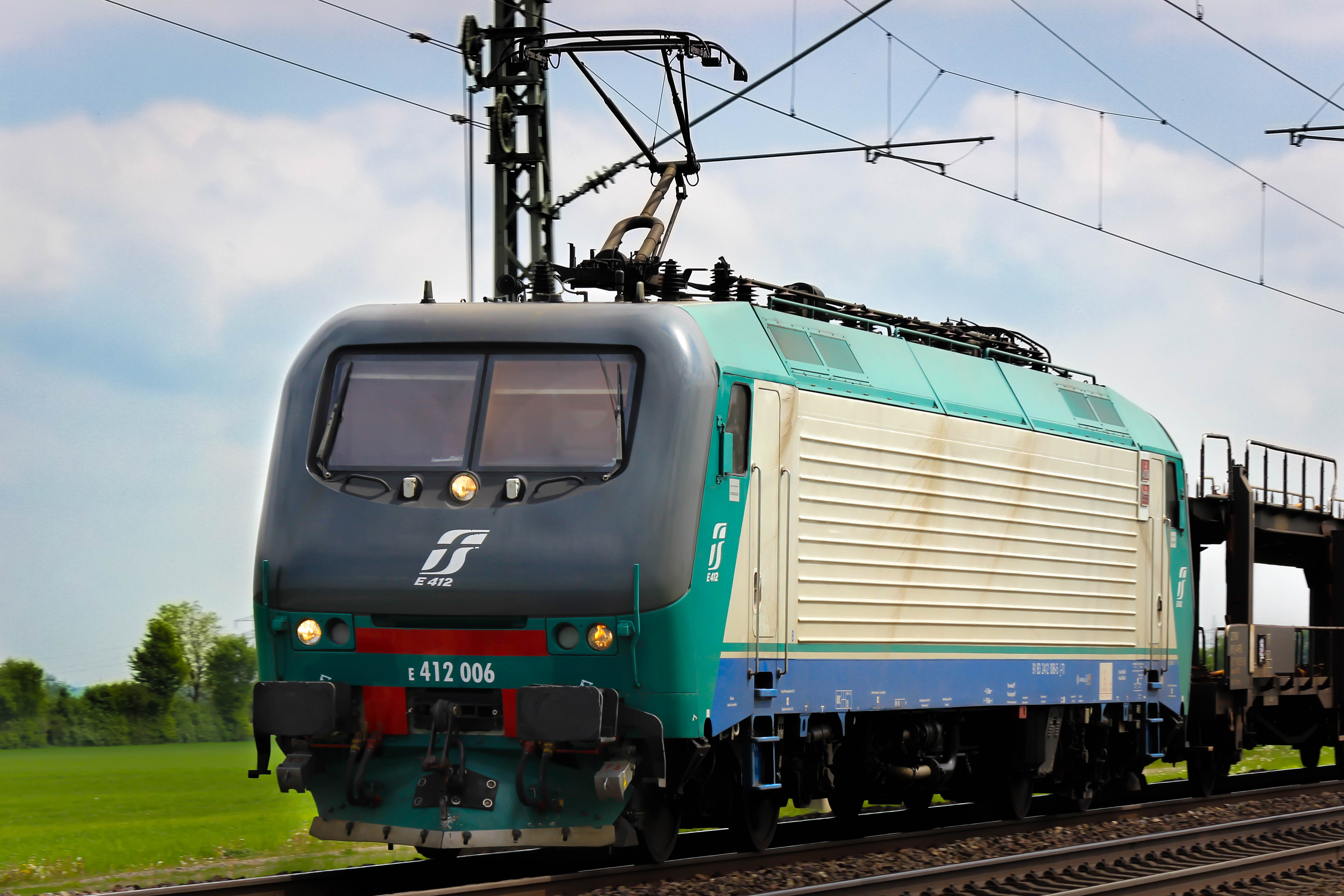
Type and origin
- Power type: Electric
- Builder: Adtranz, then Bombardier
- Build date: 1997 – 1998
Specifications
- Configuration
  - UIC: Bo′Bo′
- Gauge: 1,435 mm (4 ft 8 1/2 in) standard gauge
- Wheel diameter: 1.1 m (3 ft 7 1/4 in)
- Wheelbase: 11.4 m (37 ft 4 7/8 in) between bogie centers 2.65 m (8 ft 8 3/8 in) between axles in each bogie
- Length: 19.4 m (63 ft 7 3/4 in)
- Width: 2.85 m (9 ft 4 1/4 in)
- Height: 4.1 m (13 ft 5 3/8 in)
- Loco weight: 88.7 tonnes (87.3 long tons; 97.8 short tons)
- Electric system/s: Catenary; 3,000 V DC; 15 kV 16.7 Hz AC; 1,500 V DC
- Current pickup(s): Pantograph
- Traction motors: Three-phase asynchronous
- Transmission: 1/3.65 gear ratio
Performance figures
- Maximum speed: 220 km/h (140 mph) (limited to 200 km/h or 120 mph in Italy)
- Power output: 6,000 kW (8,000 hp) with 3 kV; 5,500 kW (7,400 hp) with 15 kV AC; 2,700 kW (3,600 hp) with 1.5 kV
- Tractive effort: 227 kN (51,000 lb_{f})
Career
- Operators: Trenitalia
- Number in class: 20 as model E.412, 8 as EU43
- First run: 1999
- Disposition: still in service

The E.412 class (factory name 112E) is a batch of multi-role electric locomotives built for the mountain lines, particularly for the northern Italian lines of the Brenner Pass. They are known as Brenner locomotives (also shortened to Brennerlok, "-lok" as German shorthand for locomotive). 28 units from both the groups have been acquired by Trenitalia, as part of a process of simplifying rail operation between Italy, Switzerland, Austria and Germany. The locomotives are qualified for running on French rails, too, making the E.412s potentially fit for service on most European lines except the high-speed rail lines.

They were initially produced by Adtranz (a consortium made up of ABB Trazione and AEG), but now are built by the Canadian company Bombardier.

== History ==
In the early 1990s, Ferrovie dello Stato started an operational plan to organize an integrated rail system with the countries on Italy's northern border, following the European political-economic unification process. Austria and Germany used different railway electrification systems, necessitating the use of a locomotive able to use a variety of electric systems: alternate and direct current, varying from 1,500 to 15,000 Volts.

The E.412 class was to be used on the longest, steepest and hardest mountain-crossing line, connecting Verona Porta Nuova and Munich via Brennero/Brenner, crowded with cargo and passenger trains and with different electrifications. Before the E.412's were introduced, the route required three locomotive changes. The Italian railroad's goal was for trains to reach Germany without changing locomotives.

The contract was signed in 1993 with an Italian-German consortium, Adtranz, headed by ABB Trazione and AEG, based in Vado Ligure. The first unit was delivered on 14 April 1997. It successfully passed its initial tests, showing excellent performance and strong reliability. The remaining 19 units in the first batch were delivered shortly after the completion of the test to the Italian railway administration. Another 8 (Polish class EU43, not to be confused with the designation later applied to Polish multisystem TRAXX locomotives) were ordered in 1996 by Polish State Railways (PKP), and they were even tested on the Żmigród test track and the German railway network, but in the end withdrew said order due to lack of financial resources and failure to find a lessor. Those locomotives were afterwards bought by the Italian company Rail Traction Company in 2001 and still have Polish EU43 designation.

In 1998 new trials were made to for service on Swiss lines. These trials resulted in failure when the deal between Trenitalia and the Logistics division of SBB was scrapped.

In 2004 the class was certified as backup power for malfunctioning locomotives. In 2005 talks began to move the class of locomotives to the passenger division, swapping them with older E.646 and E.656 class locomotives used for passenger service (but better suited for cargo). These machines could have been removed from passenger trains, and refitted as E.645 or E.655 by changing the transmission gears. Having 3 bogies instead of 2, these locomotives have better adhesion on steep grades and could be easily fitted with multiple traction control. However, those old machines have proven not very reliable, so they have been deemed not suited to the intense use on this line.

E.412.001 was the first Italian locomotive to be built with the new unified color scheme "XMPR".

The Italian E.464 class (for light commuter trains) is based on E.412, sharing part of their components to reduce building costs and to simplify maintenance.

== Technical ==
=== Engine and transmission ===
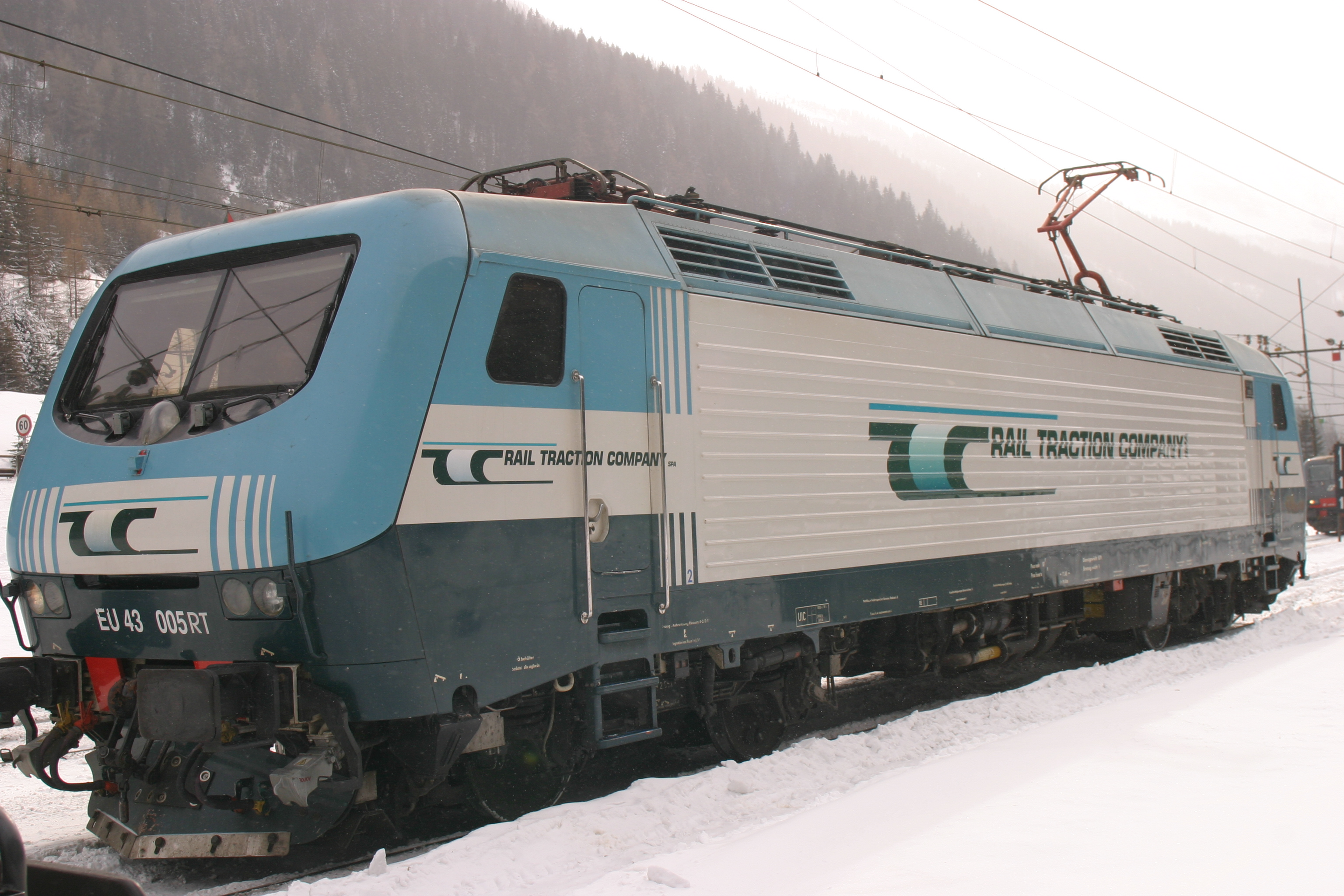
EU43.005, Rail Traction Company paintwork.

The E.412 has four very powerful three-phase asynchronous traction motors, with an electronic digital traction system based on experience on the E.632s, E.402s and experimental E.444s. The device was modified to adapt it for use with the different voltages, featuring technical innovations such as the use of a primary multitension converter as a front-end inducer to the filter feeding current.

The 6 megawatt of nominal power makes these the most powerful electric locomotives in Italy. They are 400 W more powerful than the previous record held by the E.402B.

=== Power supply ===
Pantographs are single-armed Y-shaped, built by the German company Schunk. The two pantographs are different, designed for use on two different electrification systems: one (WBL 85/15, on side B) for the 15 kV alternated, one (WBL 85/3 on side A) for the 3 kV / 1.5 kV continuous. The first can stand 0.8 kA, the second 3 kA.

The closed-circuit, liquid-cooled converters feed the triphase motors. Every converter gives energy to only one motor on every bogie, to reduce breakdown effects. Two more 450 V 60 Hz converters energize all the secondary devices, including a semiautomatic emergency fire-extinguishing system.

=== Running gear ===
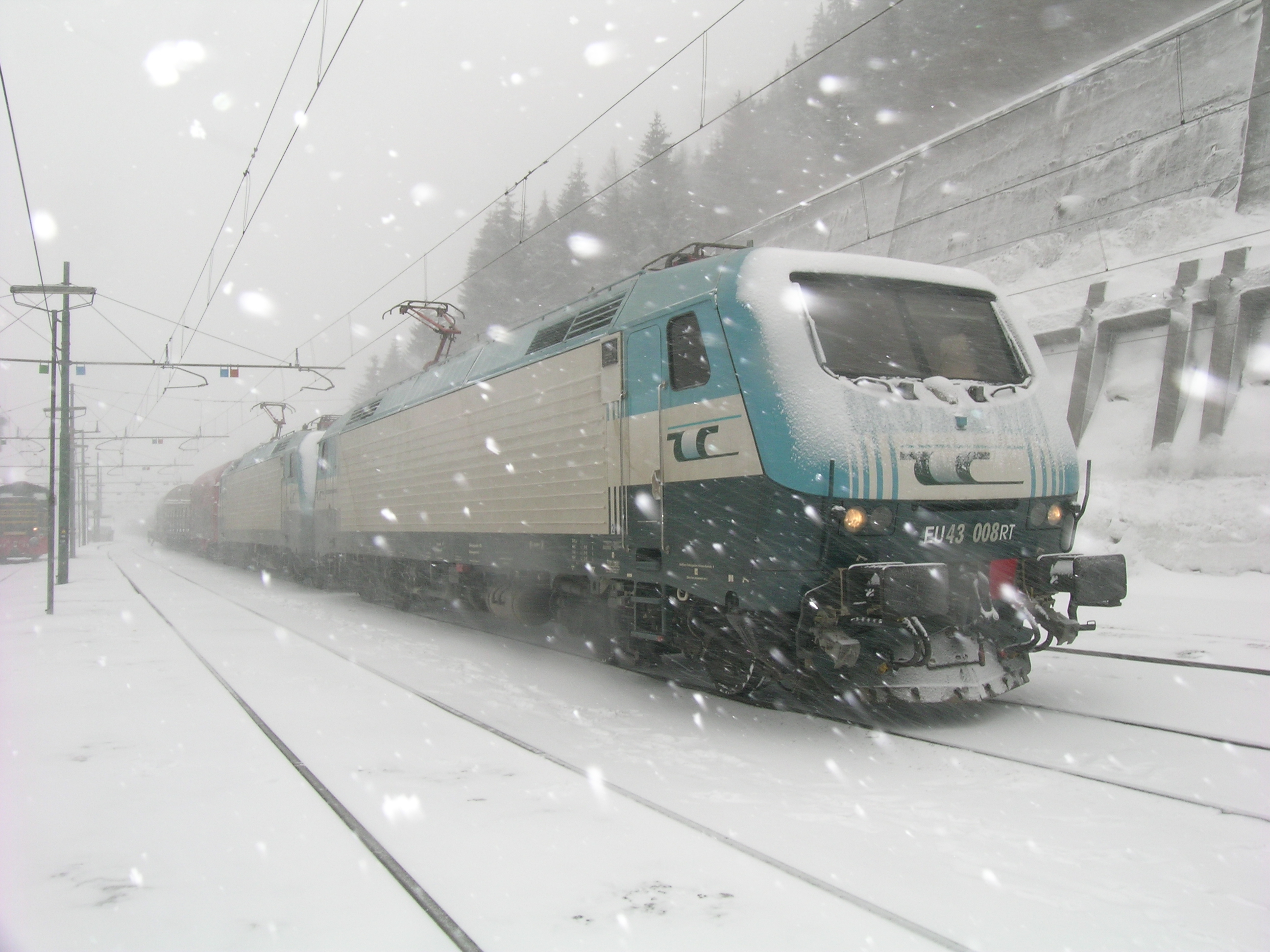
Two EU43 by Rail Traction Company cross a snow storm hauling a heavy freight train on the Brenner line.

Bogies are fixed to the chassis with Flexicoil suspension units, a solution that removes the necessity of a central rotation point. A low traction bar and an auxiliary bar hold the weight: the traction motors are partly placed on these, connected with the Adtranz bogies.

Braking on the bogies is made in two ways: mechanical and "energy recover". The first is a common system with eight self-venting discs on the four axles, automatically regulated. The second one is an advanced electric system that uses the traction motors as generators, recovering some electricity and sending it back to the line. This is a particularly efficient system on mountain lines, and is currently gaining market shares on different locomotives. The brake has different presets, fitted to cargo trains or passenger trains.

There is a third mechanic "station brake", controlled by electrovalve regulated coils. An emergency system enables the driver to totally shut down the machine pressing two big red buttons on the console, cutting off electricity and engaging the brakes.

=== Chassis ===
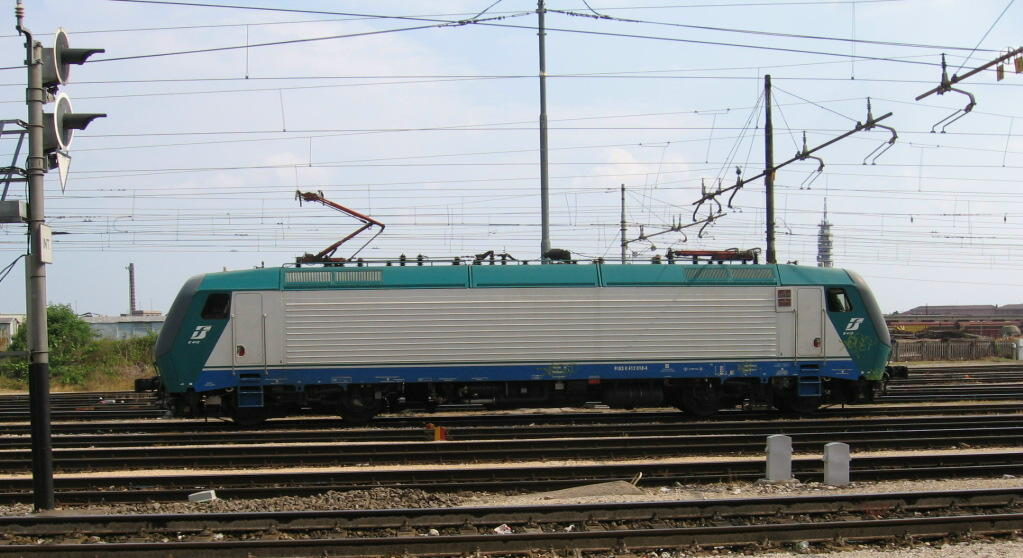
Side view of E.412.018 in Verona. The pantograph lifted is the WBL85/3, over cab "A".

The chassis is in steel beams with bent steel foils as coverings, except for the upper part in aluminium and the front shields in composite plastics. The front of the two control cabs have two characterizing "masks", styled by the designers Roberto Segoni and Paolo Pizzoccheri Des.Tech.studio made by thermoforming technology. The chassis is solid and compact, well isolated and responding to the strict standards of comfort needed by the new work laws.

=== Controls ===
The control console is made up of three different but similar parts, to follow Italian, Austrian and German laws. Movement controls are duplicated on both the left and right, and monitors for security systems of both Germany and Italy are present. Moreover, on the right side a third monitor is used for operation in Germany, where the main direction of travel on multiple track lines is the opposite from that of Italy. An on-board computer chooses the active controls, giving priority to one or another based on the electric frequency. The cabs are connected by a corridor, and have climate controls, while in the central body of the locomotive all the technical equipment that can be reached easily from the corridor are placed. The whole electric and electronic systems have a self-control system.

The E.412 locomotives have a remote control system made with a UIC TCN-18 cable for use with pilot cars, or for multiple unit operation (with a 78-wire cable). This could allow the locomotive's use with newer locomotives, but is now certified only for use with the E.405. When operating in multiple-unit working, an E.412 could serve as the lead unit (the locomotive controlled by a human operator), as a trailing unit (controlled in remote by another locomotive), or as a router (joining a modern 78-wire control connection and an older 18-wire connection).

== Railway computer games ==
- The E.412 appears in the computer games Railroad Tycoon 2 and Railroad Tycoon 3 as "Brenner E.412".
