= Adtranz =

Rail rolling stock manufacturer

DaimlerChrysler Rail Systems
- Formerly: ABB Daimler Benz Transportation
- Type: Subsidiary
- Industry: Rail transportation
- Founded: 1 January 1996; 30 years ago (through merger)
- Defunct: 1 May 2001
- Fate: Acquired by Bombardier
- Successor: Bombardier Transportation
- Headquarters: Berlin, Germany
- Key people: Rolf Eckrodt (President, Chairman)
- Products: Rail vehicles, railway electrification and signalling
- Revenue: DM5.7 billion (1996); DM6.4 billion (1997) €3.3 billion (DM6.5 billion) (1998) €3.6 billion (1999) €3.9 billion (2000)
- Owner: ABB and Daimler-Benz (1996–1999); Daimler Chrysler (1999–2001)
- Number of employees: 22,715 (1997)

Adtranz was a multi-national rail transportation equipment manufacturer with facilities concentrated in Europe and the US. The company, legally known as ABB Daimler-Benz Transportation, was created in 1996 as a joint venture between ABB and Daimler-Benz to combine their rail equipment manufacturing operations. In 1999, DaimlerChrysler (successor to Daimler-Benz) bought ABB's shares and changed the company's official name to DaimlerChrysler Rail Systems. The company was acquired by Bombardier in 2001, which merged it into its Bombardier Transportation division, which became the largest rail equipment manufacturer in the world at the time, and was ultimately acquired by Alstom in 2021.

Adtranz manufactured locomotives, high-speed, regional, metro and underground passenger trains, trams and people movers as well as freight wagons. Non-rolling stock businesses included railway electrification and signalling infrastructure.

== History ==
On 8 May 1995, ABB and Daimler-Benz proposed a merger of their rail industry-related activities into a single autonomous 50:50 joint venture; the combined group would be the largest rail-technology company in the world. In Germany the combined company, along with Siemens would have a duopoly or near-duopoly in the market areas of electric locomotives, mainline and regional electric and diesel multiple units, trams and metros, and catenary systems. In the EU, outside Germany, the merger would have meant no significant market share increase, including Scandinavia, where ABB had a dominant market share. The proposed merger was approved by government regulators on 18 October 1995, on the condition that both companies divest themselves of any shares in Kiepe, a traction components company. (Note: And other conditions relating to the company's influence and decisions regarding the Kiepe company until such time as the company's shares were sold.) The merger came into force on 1 January 1996.

The company's manufacturing facilities and product lines were rationalised, including a standard form of car body; after 18 months manufacturing costs had been reduced by 30%, revenues and orders also rose from 1996 to 1997. However the company continued to lose money, $111 million in 1997. Polish manufacturer Pafawag was acquired in 1997 and the facility modernised, controlling interests in MÁV Dunakeszi, (Note: See also Bombardier MÁV Kft. (in Hungarian)) Hungary and Schindler Waggon Switzerland were also acquired by the end of 1997.

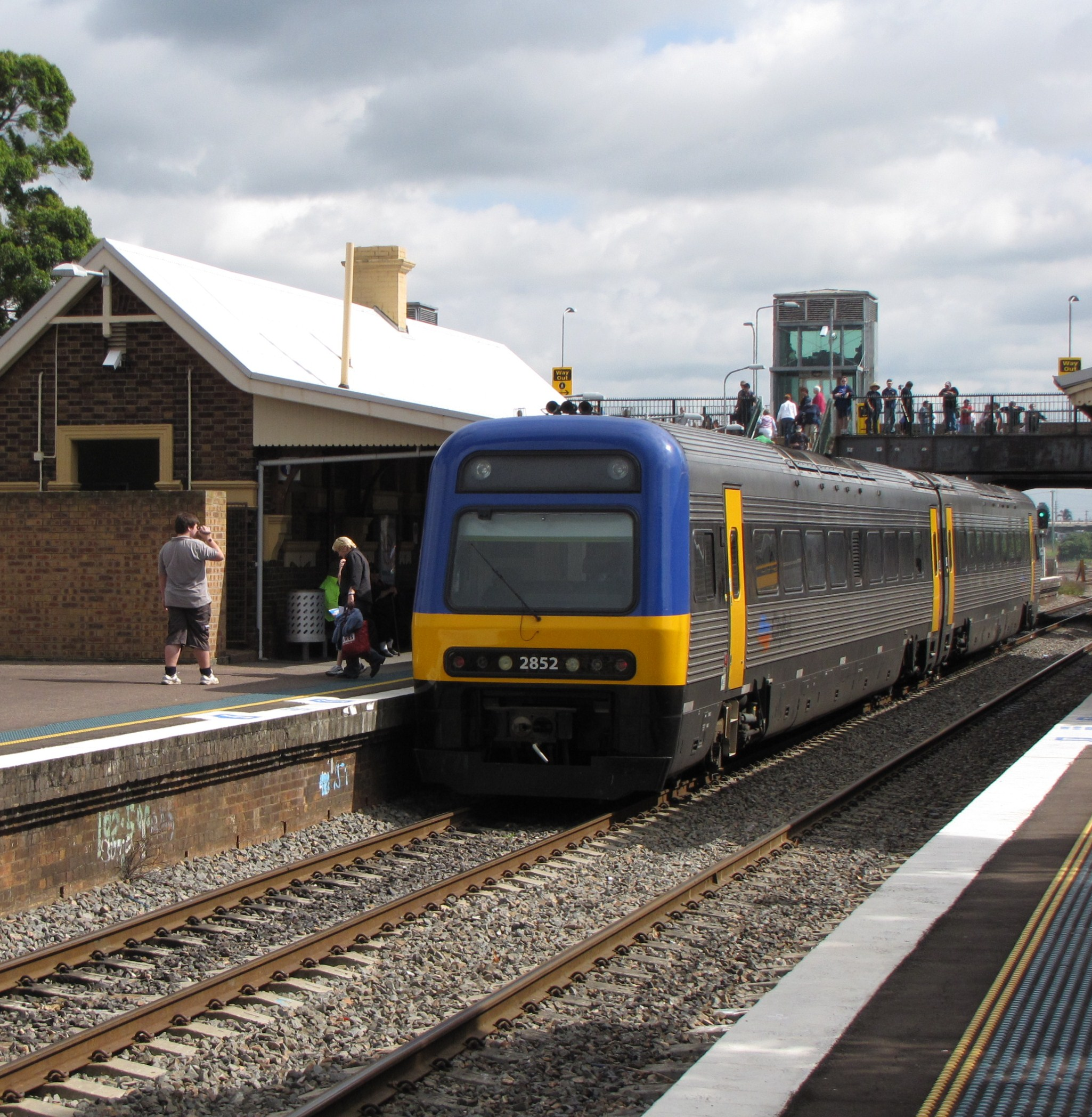
New South Wales Endeavour railcar manufactured by Adtranz

In March 1998 Adtranz presented a set of new product brands for modular product platforms, with designs that can be adapted for the specific requirements of different customers: the Innovia guided transport vehicle, the Incentro low floor tram, the Itino diesel multiple unit, the Crusaris medium-high speed train (based on the GMB Class 71 flytoget trains), and the Octeon electric locomotive. (Note: Derived from the DBAG Class 145 locomotives. See also section: DBAG Class 145 family, Adtranz Octeon platform in Traxx) A new diesel locomotive design with engine and electrical traction system provided by General Electric was introduced, named "Blue Tiger". Adtranz intended to consolidate its product range around these families once on-going deliveries were finished.

Adtranz continued operating at a loss in 1998, attributed to earlier contracts with underestimated costs, as well as technical problems with products, in spite of an order for 400 locomotives from Deutsche Bahn, necessitating the acquisition of Swiss Locomotive and Machine Works.

In January 1999, ABB sold its 50% stake in Adtranz to DaimlerChrysler for $472 million, taking up a previous agreement made on the formation of the joint venture whereby DaimlerChrysler was required to purchase ABB's stake.

Adtranz finally achieved profitability in 2000, as DaimlerChrysler prepared to sell off Adtranz. The Greenbrier Companies acquired the freight wagon manufacturing business in January 2000. The overhead electrification systems installations business was sold to Balfour Beatty in late 2000 for €153 million. No buyer was found for the railway signalling division.

The remaining assets of Adtranz were sold to Bombardier, in a $711 million deal announced in August 2000, a price considered to be low by industry analysts. (Note: The price would be subject to the acquired company entering profitability in the following year – if not the sale price would be reduced.) The sale was cleared by the European Union in April 2001 on the condition that Bombardier would license or sell the Adtranz regional train and tram products to Stadler Rail in the German market, due to the large market share of Bombardier and Adtranz in the country. The deal would make Stadler a viable independent company providing competition to Bombardier. The takeover came into legal effect on 1 May 2001 with a final price of $725 million and ADtranz was folded into the Bombardier Transportation division.

Within months of the sale, Bombardier said that it was misled about the financial situation of Adtranz. Bombardier sued DaimlerChrysler for providing misleading financial information. The companies settled in September 2004 with DaimlerChrysler agreeing to refund $209 million, making the final sale price for Adtranz just $516 million.

=== Brand ===
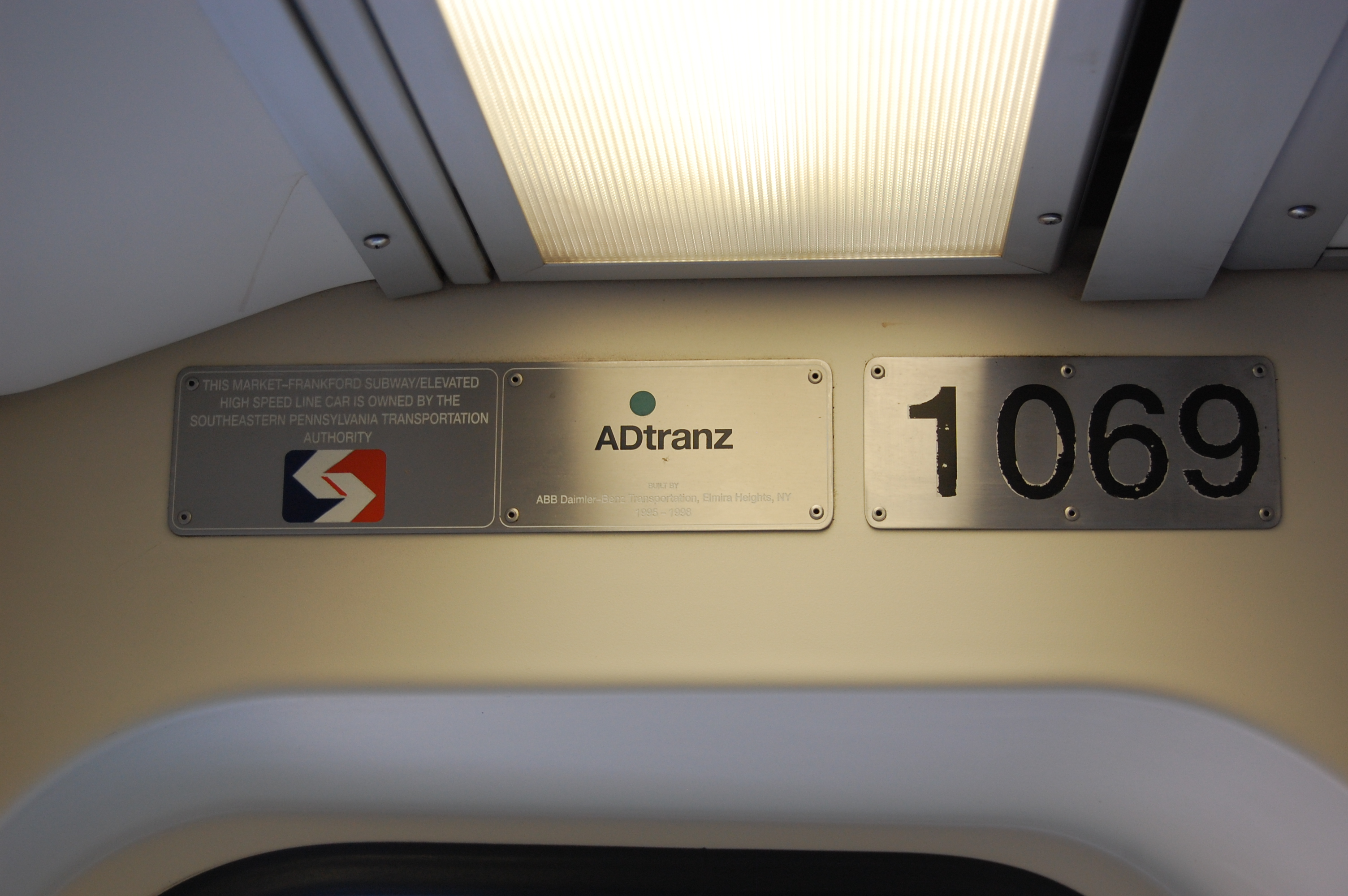
Nameplate of a SEPTA car showing the Adtranz company logo in the center

The brand Adtranz was created by Landor Associates as part of the corporate identity of ABB Daimler Benz Transportation. It is an acronym derived from selected letters of the complete name of the first company using it: ABB Daimler-Benz Transportation, with a z in place of an s at the end for the name to imply a complete product platform from A to Z. It was capitalised by the companies with a capital D as ADtranz, following the standard English text formatting and capitalisation rules it is spelled with a small d as Adtranz. Above the text ADtranz, the company logo included a green dot, symbolising a signal set on green, as well as the environmental friendliness of railways. The company also registered the slogan ADtranz – we speak railways. Rights on the brand and slogan were deleted in 2008 and 2007 respectively.

== Products ==
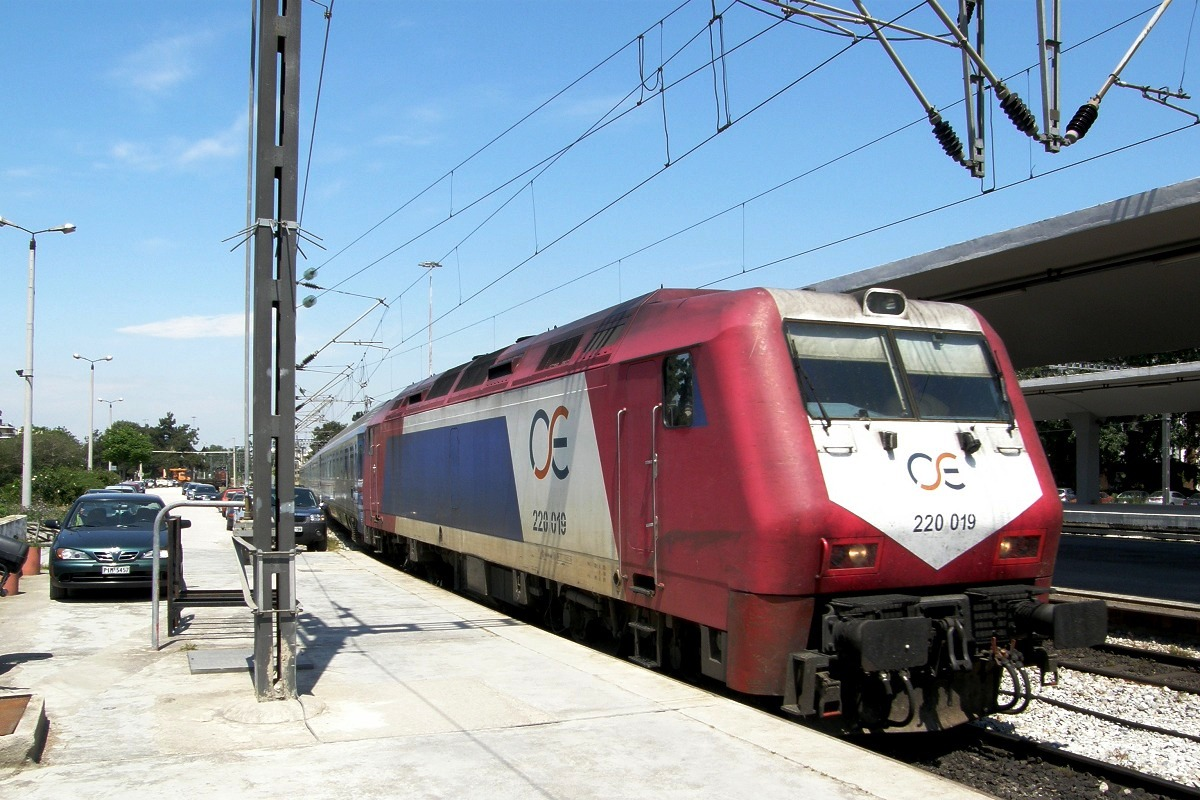
Adtranz DE2000 locomotive for Hellenic Railways Organization

Locomotives

- E464 electric locomotive
- Norges Statsbaner El 18 locomotive
- Indian Railways WAP-5 (with Chittaranjan Locomotive Works)
- DE2000 for Hellenic Railways Organisation, designated as OSE Class 220 (formerly designated as OSE A 471-496)
- DB Class 101

Subway rail vehicles

- M4 subway/elevated cars for SEPTA Market–Frankford Line, in Philadelphia
- Propulsion Systems for the New York City Subway R110A subway cars
- Propulsion Systems for the New York City Subway R142A subway cars (until 2001)
- Washington Metro 5000-series cars (with CAF)
- Hong Kong MTR Lantau Airport Railway Train (with CAF)
- DBAG Class 481 for Berlin S-Bahn
- Bilbao Metro 550 series EMUs (with CAF)
- Madrid Metro 2000B series metro cars (with CAF)
- Madrid Metro 6000 series metro cars (with CAF, Alstom and Siemens)
- Athens Metro Line 1 11th-generation metro cars (with Siemens and Hellenic Shipyards)
- Stockholm Metro C20
- Shanghai Metro AC01 and AC02 (with Siemens)
- Guangzhou Metro A1 metro cars (with Siemens)
- Prague Metro Metro M1 (Prague) metro cars (with Siemens and ČKD)

High speed trains

- German ICE 2 high speed train
- Swedish X 2000 high-speed train
- Vy BM73 and Flytoget BM71 high-speed EMUs

Passenger trains

- Swedish Regina intercity electric multiple units
- Adtranz-CAF Series 6000 trains (include MTR Adtranz-CAF EMU)
- IC3 Flexliner
- RegioSwinger tilting train
- NSW TrainLink Endeavour and Xplorer railcars in Australia
- Electrostar and Turbostars in the United Kingdom
- Queensland Rail Suburban Multiple Units and Interurban Multiple Units, Australia.
- CPTM 2000 series EMUs (with CAF and Alstom)
- Renfe Class 447 commuter EMUs (with CAF, Alstom and Siemens)

Trams

- Eurotram
- Flexity Outlook tram
- Variotram
- Incentro tram
- ADtranz low floor trams; GT6N for Berlin, Augsburg, Frankfurt (Oder), Bremen, Nurnberg, Munich, Braunschweig, Takaoka, Okayama and Toyama

Light rail passenger vehicles

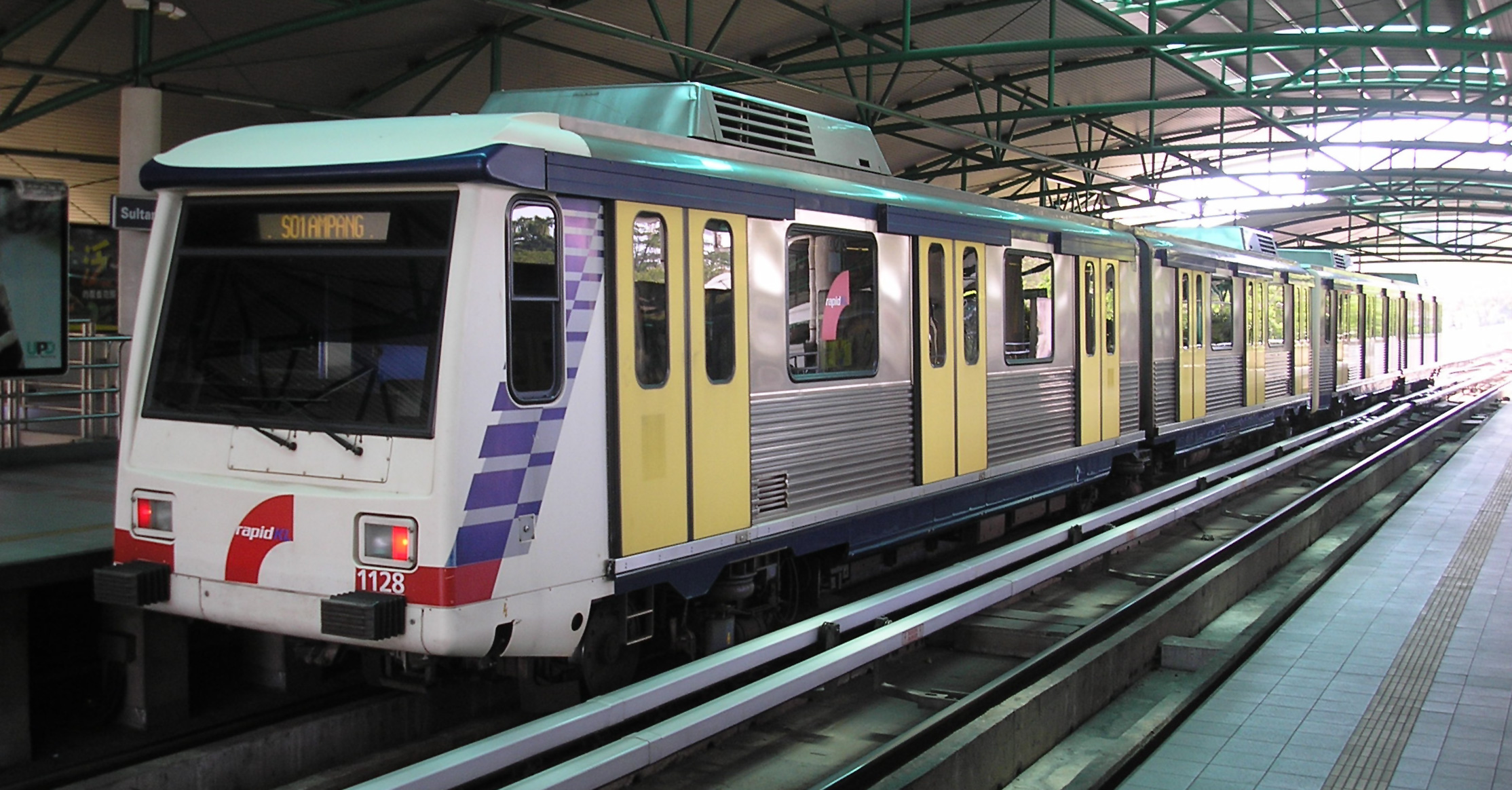
A former Kuala Lumpur Metro rolling stock of Adtranz-Walkers EMU

- Manila LRT light rail vehicles Line 1 1100 class (with Hyundai Precision)
- Ankara Metro Ankaray Light Metro Line A1 (with Siemens and AnsaldoBreda)
- İzmir Metro Line 1
- Rapid KL first-generation 6-car trains for Ampang and Sri Petaling lines (1996–2016)

Automated people movers

- Innovia APM 100

== Facilities inherited on foundation ==
- Kalmar Verkstad (Sweden)
- Strømmens Værksted (Norway)
- ABB Tecnomasio in Vado Ligure (Italy)
- Henschel-Werke
- Dandenong rolling stock factory, Australia)
- AEG Schienenfahrzeuge in Hennigsdorf (Germany)
- Derby Litchurch Lane Works, England)
- Sorefame (Portugal)
- Westinghouse Transportation (Pittsburgh, PA, US) – via AEG acquisition 1988
