= Alfa Romeo Avio =

- Industry: Aeronautics
- Founded: 1941
- Fate: Acquired by Fiat Avio
- Headquarters: Pomigliano d'Arco, Italy
- Products: Aircraft engines
- Revenue: 300 billion £ (1996)
- Operating income: £ 30 billion
- Number of employees: 1,500 (1996)

The Alfa Romeo Avio was an Italian aviation company producing aircraft engines active since 1941. It was founded as a division of Alfa Romeo but was sold to Aeritalia in 1986 and then to Fiat in 1996. It was merged with Fiat Avio in 2003 as Avio S.p.A.

== History ==
=== The early years ===
The first Alfa Romeo engine used on an airplane was installed in 1910. Designed and created by designer Antonio Santoni and Alfa Romeo driver Nino Franchini, the airplane was equipped with the engine from an ALFA 24 HP designed by Giuseppe Merosi with a maximum power of 36 horsepower (27 kW). The Santoni-Franchini biplane made its first flight on 1 November 1910 in Milan, taking off from Baggio and landing in San Siro.

Alfa Romeo's involvement in aviation continued after the takeover by Nicola Romeo. During the Nicola Romeo ownership, the company received orders from the Italian war ministry to build 300 license Isotta Fraschini V6 engines for bombers used in the First World War. However, after the war ended, having made a prototype of a 600 horsepower (450 kW) V12 engine, the Alfa Romeo aviation business was temporarily suspended.

Alfa Romeo resumed activity in aviation in 1924. Nicola Romeo purchased a license to build the Bristol Jupiter IV, an air-cooled nine cylinder radial engine. These engines were then used on reconnaissance and observation aircraft like the IMAM Ro.1, Meridionali Ro.1 and Caproni Ca.97. They were also used, experimentally, on the Caproni Ca.102 bomber and Ansaldo AC.3 fighter. In 1928, Pasquale Gallo, who replaced Nicola Romeo at the head of Alfa Romeo, also managed to win a contract to produce the Armstrong Siddeley Lynx seven and nine cylinder radials under license.

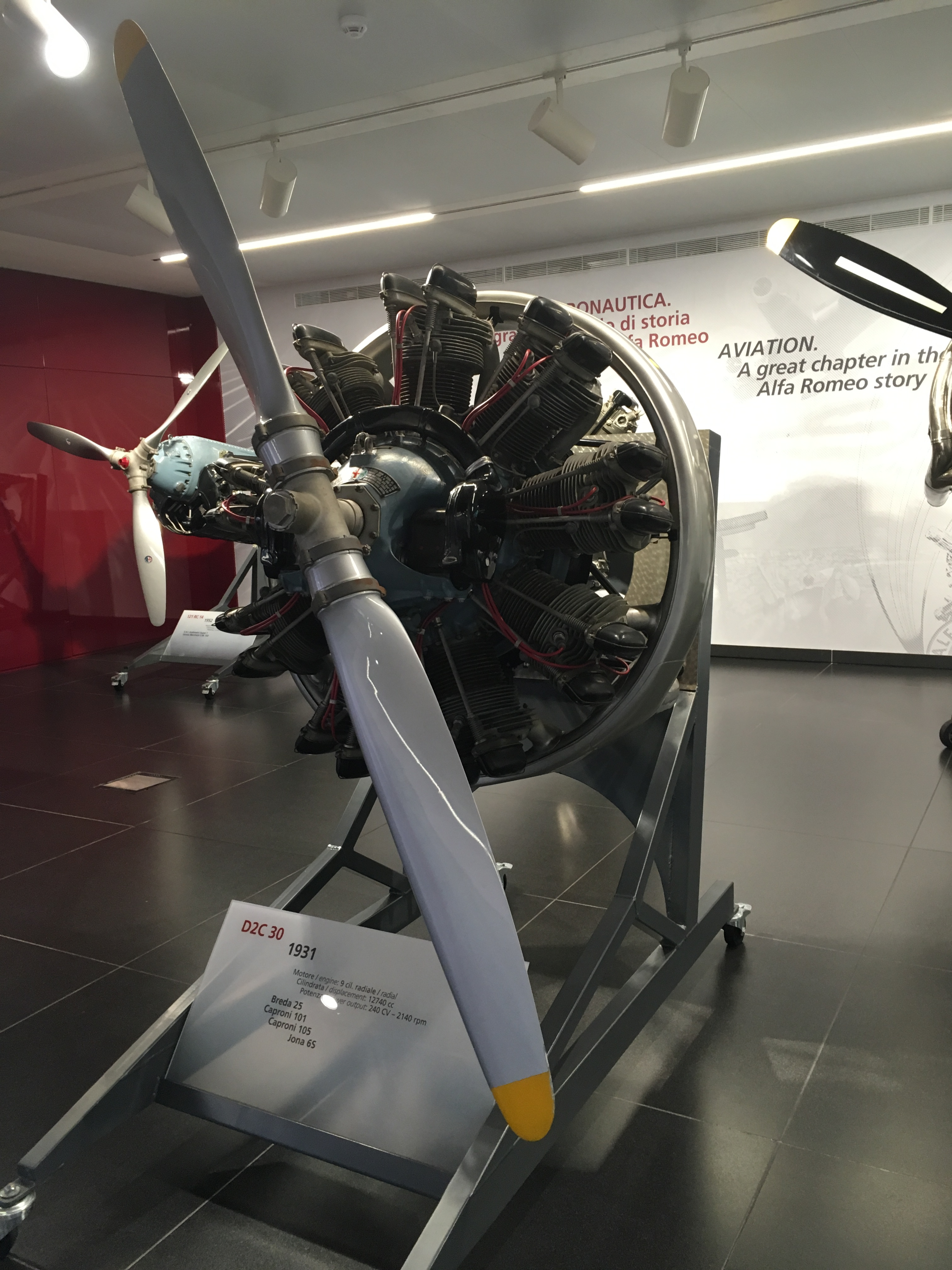
Alfa Romeo D2C engine

At the end of the twenties, Alfa Romeo director, Prospero Gianferrari, decided to diversify the company's business, and invest in the design and construction of aircraft engines in addition to trucks and buses. To demonstrate the new prowess, and the way that their expertise spread between aviation and motoring, in 1931 Alfa Romeo organized a race between an Alfa Romeo 8C 3000 Monza driven by Tazio Nuvolari and a Caproni Ca.100, also Alfa Romeo powered. Tazio Nuvolari beat the airplane by a small margin. The first big result of this change in strategy was the production, in 1932, of the first aircraft engine completely designed, developed and built by the Alfa Romeo, the D2.

Unfortunately, this development was too late for Alfa Romeo who were declared bankrupt in 1933. The state-owned Istituto per la Ricostruzione Industriale stepped in to take control and a new managing director, Ugo Gobbato, was appointed. Development and production of aircraft engines resumed. The D2 engine was used to power the Breda Ba.25, the most widely used Italian basic trainer of the 1930s, and the Caproni Ca.101. It was complemented by further development of the license-built Jupiter, the Alfa Romeo 125, 125 RC.35, 126 RC.10, 126 RC.34, 128 RC.18, 128 RC.21 and 129 RC.32, some of which saw widespread use. For example, the 126 RC.34 was installed on five different airplanes: the Savoia-Marchetti S.74, SM.75, SM.79, SM.81 and Cant Z.506. Other aircraft engines derived from foreign designs in this decade included the 110, based on the De Havilland Gypsy Major, the 115, based on the De Havilland Gypsy Six and the Mercurius, based on the Bristol Mercury. At the same time, Alfa Romeo developed and produced its own propellers, both fixed and variable pitch, made from duralumin.

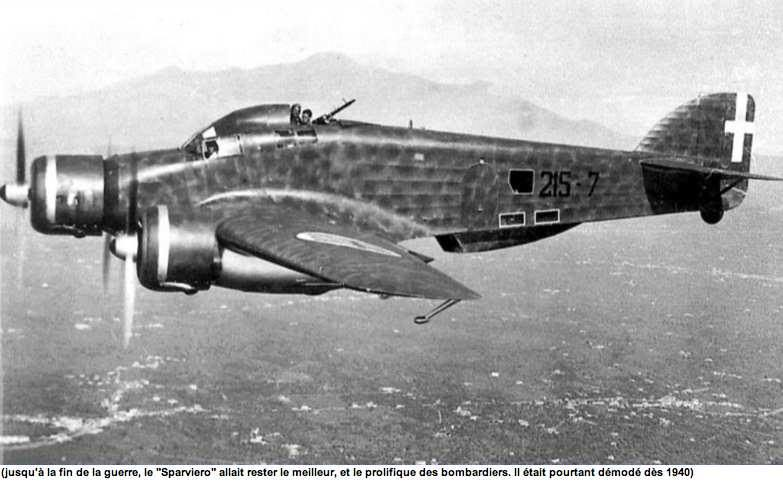
SM.79 "Sparviero" used Alfa Romeo 128 RC.18 radial engines

In the thirties, the Alfa Romeo engines for the aviation industry became famous for their successful participation in the various attempts to break world records in aviation and for their sporting triumphs. The Alfa Romeo aircraft engines of this period, used largely on the aircraft of the Regia Aeronautica, helped to write important pages in the history of Italian aviation.

Some of the metal alloys used in the aviation business were patented and later used in cars. One of the most famous metal alloys designed and developed by Alfa Romeo was "Duralfa".

=== The birth of Alfa Romeo Avio ===
Macchi C.202 "Folgore"

In the late thirties the political situation in Europe was changing as the winds of war brought many nations, including Italy, into an arms race. Alfa Romeo's production was directed away from civilian cars towards the assembly of the aircraft engines and trucks that would help Italy in a future armed conflict. Soon aircraft production was generating almost 80% of Alfa Romeo's sales revenue.

In this context, in 1938, it was decided to build a production plant in Pomigliano d'Arco, near Naples, dedicated to the design and assembly of aircraft engines. In the following years the plant in Pomigliano d'Arco reached levels of quality and technological achievement that put it among the leading factories of the period.

See Alfa Romeo Pomigliano d'Arco plant

After the outbreak of World War II, plant director Ugo Gobbato (1888–1945) decided to establish a separate division for aircraft products. Thus, in 1941, Alfa Romeo Avio was born. The aircraft engines produced by the Alfa Romeo in this period were almost all air-cooled radial engines. One exception was the RA 1000 RC.41, which was licensed from Daimler-Benz and used fighter planes like the Reggiane Re.2001 and Macchi M.C.202.

The Second World War left many signs in the Portello plant and the production site of Pomigliano d'Arco, which was considered a very important war supplier. Because of its strategic importance, the plant in Milan suffered two heavy bombing raids on 14 February and 13 August 1943. The final raid came on October 20, 1944, which was the heaviest bombardment that Milan had suffered, destroying more than 60% of the factory and closing the production site down. The plant in Pomigliano d'Arco suffered a similar fate on 30 May 1943, with the destruction of 70% of the factory by air attack.

=== Postwar developments ===
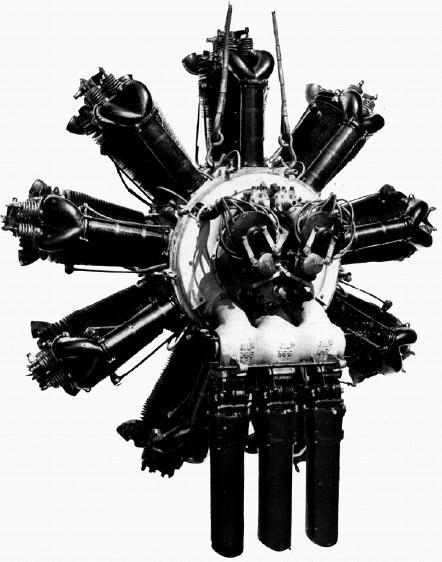
Alfa Romeo Jupiter

After the war, military production ceased and the factory in Pomigliano d'Arco was temporarily converted to produce cars, trucks, trolley buses, diesel engines, generators and marine engines, as well as testing car engines and chassis. Shortly after, the site reopened as a maintenance site for aircraft engines, but this activity was substantially smaller than even pre-war production, since the operations were initially only the repair of Bristol engines and production of replacement parts.

In 1947 the management of the plant in Pomigliano d'Arco passed from Alfa Romeo to Metalmeccanica Meridionale, but in 1948 Alfa Romeo returned to aircraft engine production. In 1949 Alfa Romeo made an alliance with Fiat, SAI Ambrosini and Aermacchi to produce de Havilland aircraft, with Fiat sharing responsibility for the engine with Alfa Romeo and the latter two companies taking responsibility for the rest of the aircraft. One product of this collaboration, an Alfa Romeo 110 powered Ambrosini S.1001 "Grifo" named Angelo dei Bimbi (Children's Angel), had a significant effect on the media. In 1949, the aircraft made the trip from Milan to Buenos Aires in 19 hours to raise funds for injured children injured, followed by a 7,600 km (4,700 mi) flight over the Andes in 1950 as a Missione di Italianità (Mission of the Italian Spirit). In 1953, the same aircraft flew across the arctic, raising the international profile of the Italian aerospace industry still further.

In the fifties Alfa Romeo continued to collaborate with Fiat, producing jet engines, but production remained below pre-war levels. In 1952, of the 500 employed at the factory in Pomigliano d'Arco, only 160 worked in activities primarily link to aviation. Although management of the operation returned to Alfa Romeo, activities at Pomigliano d'Arco were limited, reduced to the repair and the construction of combustion engines.

In 1962 it was decided to reorganize the plant. Alongside the "Vehicles" and "Diesel" sections, a "Avio" division was restored. The revived Alfa Romeo Avio began to diversify its operation. Its repair and maintenance side expanded to deal with repairing Curtiss-Wright R-1820 and R-3350 piston engines, Rolls-Royce Avon and Wright J65 turbojets, Rolls-Royce Dart turboprops and Rolls-Royce Conway turbofans mounted on Italian and Norwegian airplanes. Alfa Romeo license built the Bristol Siddeley Orpheus for the Fiat G.91 programme, one of a number of examples of cooperation between the companies during the decade, and was the European distributor of the General Electric J85 and CJ610 turbojets. It was also involved, alongside FIAT, FN of Belgium and BMW, in the European production programme for the production of a FIAT (General Electric) J79-GE-11A turbojet to power the Lockheed F-104 Starfighter that was being built in Europe and was used extensively by many NATO air forces.

Given that the activities at the plant were expanding, the leadership of the Alfa Romeo decided to invest in the training of workers and technicians. At the same time, politicians keen to see development in southern Italy, supported the creation of the Alfasud factory next to the Alfa Romeo Avio facility, greatly increasing the level of local skills. Turnover of Alfa Romeo Avio increased by 34% from 1968 to 1969 and in the second half of the sixties the company successfully exhibited its aircraft engines in various international air exhibitions.

In the seventies, in the civil field, Alfa Romeo repaired all the types of turbine engines used by Alitalia and other Italian airlines, while, in the military arena, Alfa Romeo concentrated mainly on piston engines used by the Italian Army. In 1974, Alfa Romeo began a collaboration with Rolls-Royce to design, develop and assemble gas turbines.

In 1975 the workforce employed by Alfa Romeo Avio had grown to 2,000 workers, although by 1980 this had settled to 1,300 employees. The company focused its work on supporting Pratt & Whitney, Rolls-Royce and General Electric engines. However, development of indigenous engines did not halt. In 1979, Alfa Romeo achieved another milestone as it was the first Italian company to design, develop and build a turboprop aircraft engine (the AR.318), which was installed on a Beechcraft King Air. In 1981, Alfa Romeo Avio took part, along with Oto Melara and Fiat Avio in the development of the supersonic Otomach missile derived from the successful Otomat.

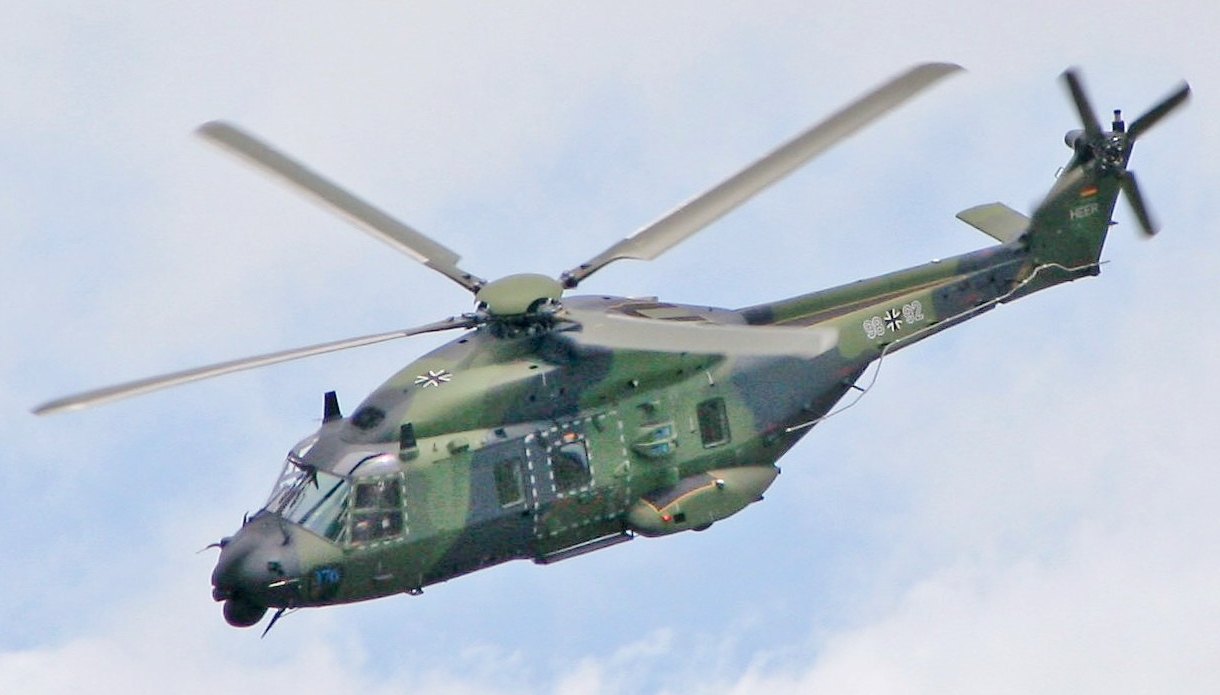
NH-90 TTH of Bundeswehr demonstrated at ILA 2006.

In 1982, Alfa Romeo transferred 10% of its shares in Alfa Romeo Avio to Aeritalia, that share grew to 60% in 1984. In 1986, when Alfa Romeo was sold to Fiat, the remaining shares still owned by Alfa Romeo was bought by Aeritalia. As a result, Alfa Romeo Avio became part of Finmeccanica, the owner of Aeritalia and at the time state-owned. With the privatization of state-owned companies, including Finmeccanica, in 1996, the ownership of Alfa Romeo Avio was passed to Fiat Avio, bringing with it a turnover of 300 billion lire and 1,500 workers. Since 2003, Alfa Romeo Avio has been part of the Avio group. The combined company was involved in 2005 in the development of T700-T6E1 engine for the NH90 NHI helicopter.

== Bibliography ==
- Archivio Storico Alfa Romeo. Vol. II. Torino. 1998.
- Jotti da Badia Polesine (1934). Libreria Aeronautica (ed.). Annuario dell'Aeronautica Italiana. Milano.
- Pellegrini, Gianlucai (2003). Editoriale Domus (ed.). Enciclopedia dell'auto – Quattroruote. Rozzano.
- Sannia, Alessandro (2010). Gribaudo (ed.). Alfa Romeo – 100 anni di leggenda. Milano. ISBN 978-887906-972-4.
- Tabucchi, Maurizio (2010). Giorgio Nada Editore (ed.). Alfa Romeo 1910-2010. Milano. ISBN 978-88-7911-502-5.
