= Macchi M.C.100 =

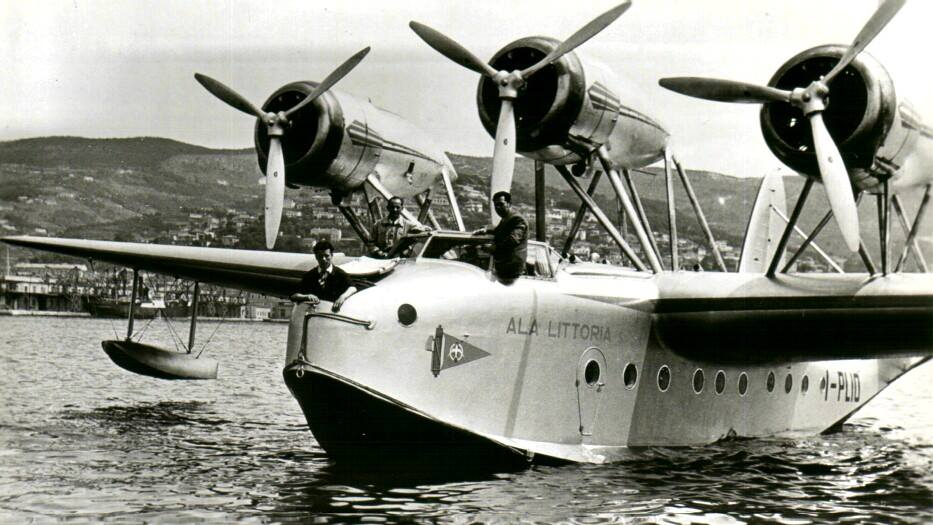

General information
- Type: Passenger flying boat
- Manufacturer: Macchi
- Designer: Mario Castoldi
- Primary user: Ala Littoria
- Number built: 3

History
- First flight: 1939

The Macchi M.C.100 was an Italian commercial flying boat designed and built by Macchi.

== Design and development ==
The M.C.100 was a shoulder-wing cantilever monoplane flying boat, with a family resemblance to the military twin-engine M.C.99 and earlier M.C.94. It was powered by three Alfa Romeo 126 RC 10 radial engines strut-mounted above the wing, each driving a three-bladed tractor propeller. The pilot and co-pilot sat side by side in a raised and enclosed control cabin forward of the wing, while the radio operator sat in the aircraft's nose. A main cabin in the hull had accommodation for 26 passengers.

The prototype first flew on 7 January 1939. The prototype was followed by two more aircraft, and all three were in service by June 1940 with Ala Littoria operating between Rome-Algiers-Barcelona. With the start of World War II, the aircraft was used for liaison and communication duties, and to maintain a daily Rome-Marsala-Tripoli service.

== Operators ==
Kingdom of Italy

- Ala Littoria

== Specifications (M.C.100) ==
Data from Wings of Peace: Macchi C.94 and C.100.

General characteristics

- Crew: three
- Capacity: 26 passengers
- Length: 17.40 m (57 ft 1 in)
- Wingspan: 24.35 m (79 ft 10.25 in)
- Wing area: 100 m^{2} (1,076 sq ft)
- Empty weight: 8,568 kg (18,849 lb)
- Gross weight: 13,130 kg (28,880 lb)
- Powerplant: 3 × Alfa Romeo 126 RC 10 radial engine , 597 kW (800 hp) each

Performance

- Maximum speed: 310 km/h (193 mph, 168 kn)
- Cruise speed: 262 km/h (163 mph, 142 kn)
- Range: 1,400 km (869 mi, 755 nmi)
- Service ceiling: 6,102 m (20,013 ft)

== See also ==
Related lists

- List of seaplanes and flying boats
