= Ambrosini SAI.2 =

SAI.2

General information
- Type: Racing aircraft
- Manufacturer: Ambrosini
- Designer: Sergio Stefanutti
- Number built: 1

History
- First flight: 1934

The Ambrosini SAI.2 was a light monoplane built in Italy in 1934. Like the SAI.1, it was designed to participate in the Avioraduno del Littorio rally of 1935. Compared with that aircraft, the SAI.2's wing area was only 1.4 m^{2} (15 ft^{2}) less, but the reduction in drag as a result of the monoplane configuration versus that of a biplane resulted in a top speed 20 km/h (12 mph) higher. Both aircraft used the same engine type.

Despite the similarity in designation, the subsequent SAI.2S was a completely unrelated design.

== Specifications ==
General characteristics

- Crew: one pilot
- Capacity: 4 passengers
- Length: 7.1 m (23 ft 3 in)
- Wingspan: 10.24 m (33 ft 7 in)
- Height: 2.4 m (7 ft 10 in)
- Wing area: 15.8 m^{2} (170 sq ft)
- Empty weight: 695 kg (1,530 lb)
- Gross weight: 1,065 kg (2,350 lb)
- Powerplant: 1 × Fiat A.54 radial , 100 kW (140 hp)

Performance

- Maximum speed: 240 km/h (150 mph, 130 kn)
