= Gobbato =

Gobbato is a surname. Notable people with the surname include:

- Giuseppe Gobbato (born 1904, date of death unknown), Italian racewalker
- Ugo Gobbato (1888–1945), Italian engineer and business executive
- Pier Ugo Gobbato (1918–2008), Italian racing driver, engineer and general manager of Ferrari and Lancia, son of Ugo Gobbato.
