= CA 97 =

CA 97 may refer to:

- U.S. Route 97 in California, a US highway
- Caproni Ca.97, an experimental aircraft
