= Alfa Romeo 125 =

125, 126, 127, 128, 129 and 131
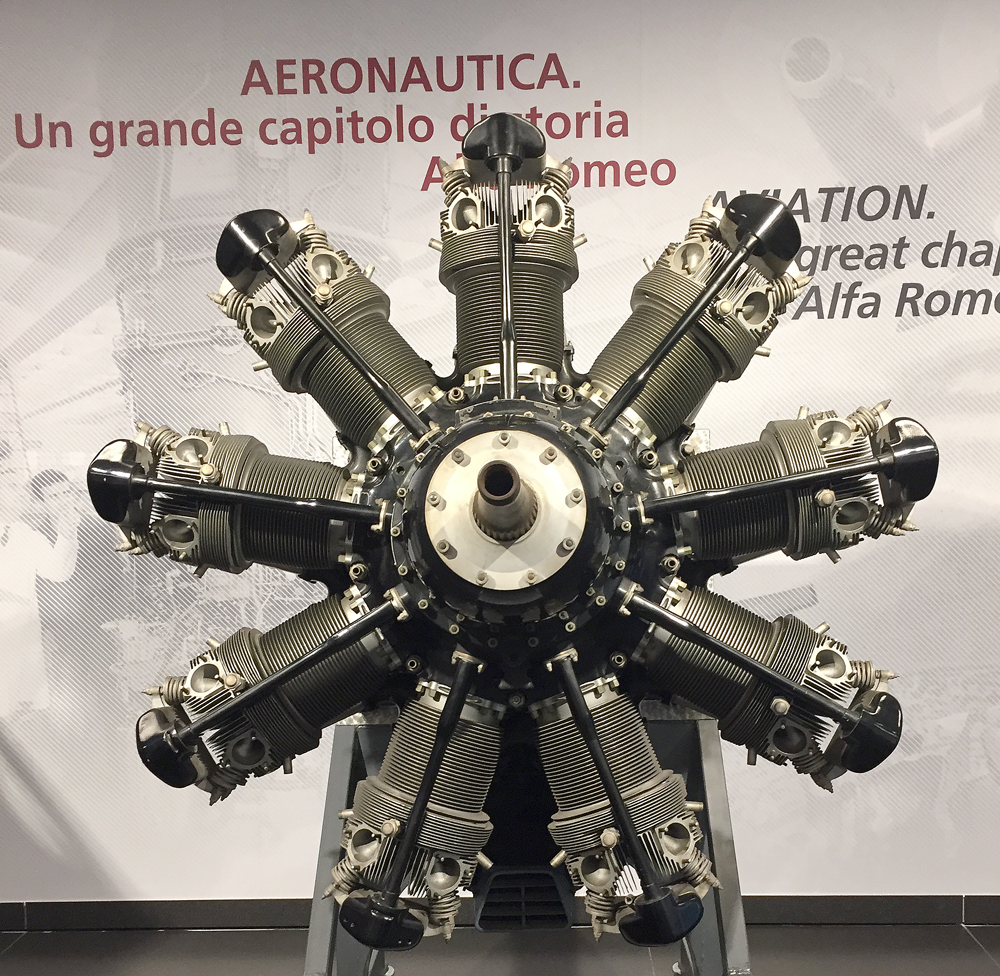
- A 610 kW (820 hp) Alfa Romeo 128 R.C.18 from ca1939.
- Type: Piston aircraft engine
- Manufacturer: Alfa Romeo
- First run: 1930s
- Major applications: Savoia-Marchetti SM.79
- Number built: ~11,000

Alfa Romeo built/designed a range of aircraft engines based on the Bristol Jupiter and Bristol Pegasus designs, designated Alfa 125, Alfa 126, Alfa 127, Alfa 128, Alfa 129 and Alfa 131. All these essentially similar engines were mainly fitted to Italian bombers in World War II, Alfa Romeo building around 11,000 units between 1934 and 1944

== Design and development ==
Alfa Romeo adapted the Jupiter / Pegasus (which are very closely related) to metric measurements, local materials and indigenous equipment.

== Variants ==
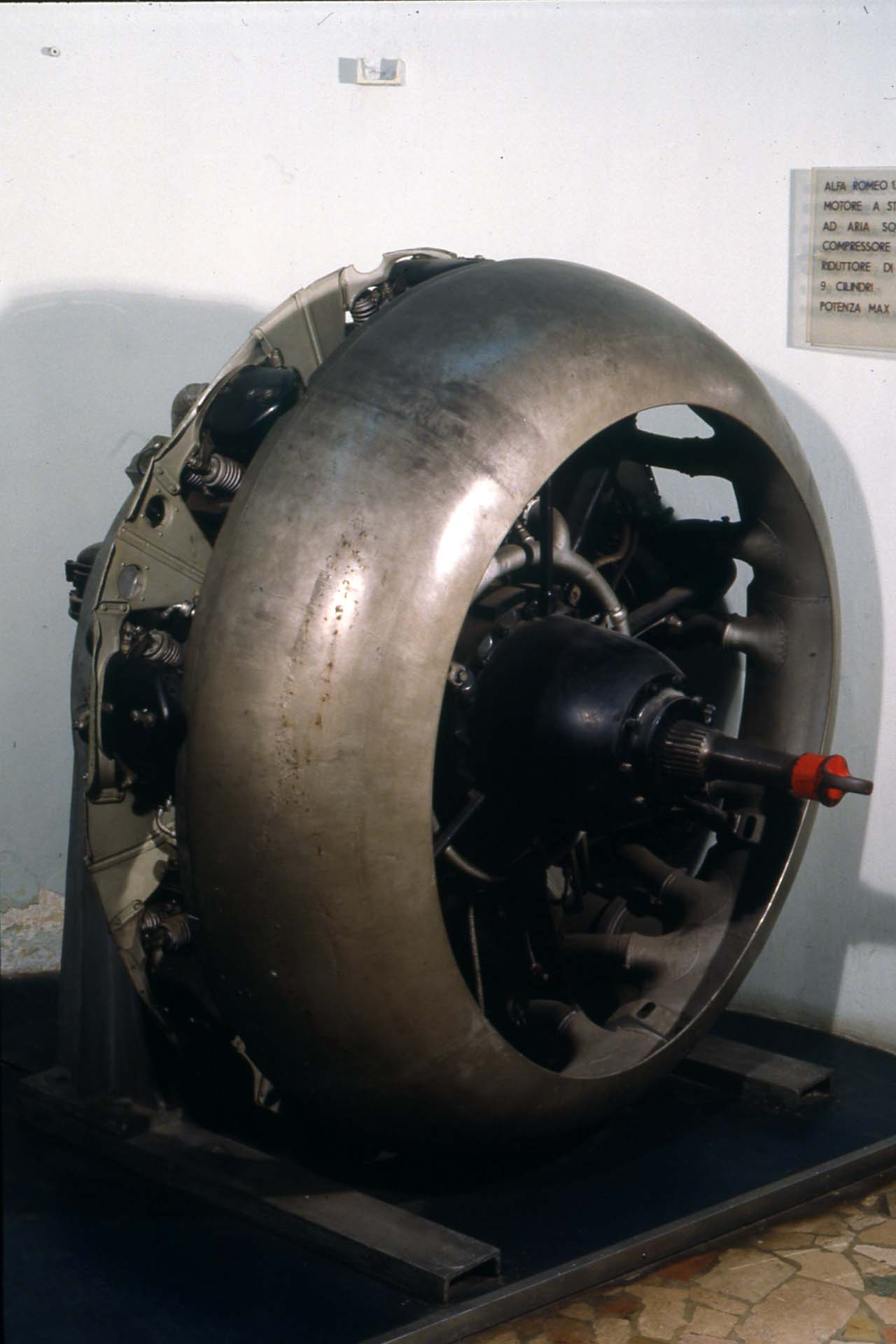
Alfa Romeo 131, 9-cyl radial engine.

(The Italian engine designation system includes a suffix indicating major components or attributes. The most common were R for Riduttore - reduction gear and C for Compressore - compressor/supercharger, followed by a number indicating the rated altitude in hundreds of metres, two speed superchargers were indicated by a double figure such as 10/34).

Alfa Romeo Jupiter

The standard 313 kW (420 hp) Jupiter engine built under licence from the Bristol Aeroplane Company.

Alfa 125 R.C.10
rated at 1,000 m (3,300 ft)

Alfa 125 R.C.35
1934 — 485 kW (650 hp) rated at 3,500 m (11,500 ft)

Alfa 126 R.C.10
1935 — Civilian version of 126 R.C.34 559–597 kW (750–801 hp) rated at 1,000 m (3,300 ft)

Alfa 126 R.C.32
rated at 3,200 m (10,500 ft)

Alfa 126 R.C.34
1935 — 507–582 kW (680–780 hp) rated at 3,400 m (11,200 ft)

Alfa 127 R.C.50
rated at 5,000 m (16,000 ft)

Alfa 127 R.C.55
1937 — 560 kW (750 hp) rated at 5,500 m (18,000 ft)

Alfa 128 R.C.18
641–717 kW (860–962 hp) rated at 1,800 m (5,900 ft)

Alfa 128 R.C.21
1938 — 708 kW (949 hp) rated at 2,100 m (6,900 ft)

Alfa 129 R.C.32
rated at 3,200 m (10,500 ft)

Alfa 131 R.C.14/50
1943 — Two speed supercharger, rated at 1,400 m (4,600 ft) in low gear and 5,000 m (16,000 ft) in high gear.

== Applications ==
- Breda Ba.64 (Alfa125 R.C.35)
- CANT Z.506A Airone (Alfa 126 R.C.10)
- CANT Z.506B Airone (Alfa 126 R.C.34 / Alfa 127 R.C.50 / Alfa 127 R.C.55)
- CANT Z.506C Airone (Alfa 126 R.C.10)
- Caproni Bergamaschi AP.1 (Alfa126 R.C.34)
- Caproni Ca.97 (AlfaJupiter)
- DAR-10A (prototype) (Alfa126 R.C.34)
- Fiat G.12 (Alfa 128 R.C.18)
- Junkers Ju 52 (Alfa126 R.C.34)
- Macchi M.C.94 (Alfa 126 R.C.10)
- Macchi M.C.100 (Alfa 126 R.C.10)
- Savoia-Marchetti S.73 (Alfa 126 R.C.10 / Alfa 126 R.C.34)
- Savoia-Marchetti S.74 (Alfa126 R.C.34)
- Savoia-Marchetti SM.75 Marsupiale (Alfa 128 R.C.18 / Alfa 128 R.C.21)
- Savoia-Marchetti S.77 (Alfa 126 R.C.10)
- Savoia-Marchetti S.M.79 Sparviero (Alfa 128 R.C.18 / Alfa 125 R.C.35 / Alfa126 R.C.34)
- Savoia-Marchetti S.M.79-II Sparviero (Alfa 126 R.C.34)
- Savoia-Marchetti S.M.79B Sparviero (Alfa 128 R.C.18)
- Savoia-Marchetti S.M.81 Pipistrello (Alfa 125 R.C.35 / Alfa 126 R.C.34)
- Savoia-Marchetti S.M.82 Canguru (Alfa 128 R.C.18 / Alfa 128 R.C.21 / Alfa 129 R.C.32)
- Savoia-Marchetti S.M.83 (Alfa126 R.C.34)
- Savoia-Marchetti S.M.84 (Alfa 128 R.C.21)
- Savoia-Marchetti S.M.95 (Alfa 128 R.C.18 / Alfa 131 R.C.14/50)

== Specifications (Alfa 128 R.C.21) ==
Data from Aircraft Engines of the World 1945 Archivio Storico Alfa Romeo - Volume II

=== General characteristics ===
- Type: 9-cylinder air-cooled radial engine
- Bore: 146 mm (5.75 in)
- Stroke: 190 mm (7.48 in)
- Displacement: 28.6 L (1,745.28 cu in)
- Length: 1,329 mm (52.3 in)
- Diameter: 1,400 mm (55.1 in)
- Dry weight: 516 kg (1,138 lb)
- Frontal Area: 1.54 m^{2} (16.6 sq ft)

=== Components ===
- Valvetrain: 2 x inlet valves and 2 x exhaust valves per cylinder operated by pushrods and rockers
- Supercharger: Gear-driven 1-speed, 8.8:1 ratio, supercharger
- Fuel system: 1 x Mona-Hobson AVT85MC updraught carburettor with automatic boost control
- Fuel type: 87 octane
- Oil system: 551.6 kPa (80 psi), dry sump.
- Cooling system: Air-cooled
- Reduction gear: Epicyclic bevel reduction gear, 0.65:1 ratio.
- Starter: Garelli compressed air starter
- Ignition: 2 x Marelli MF9 magnetos, 2 x spark plugs per cylinder, fed by a shielded harness.

=== Performance ===
- Power output:
  - Take-off: 708 kW (950 hp) at 2,300 rpm with 1,000 mm (39.37 in) Hg boost
  - Military: 641 kW (860 hp) at 2,300 rpm at 2,100 m (6,900 ft)
  - Cruising: 492 kW (660 hp) at 1,800 rpm at 2,500 m (8,200 ft)
- Specific power: 24.57 kW/L (0.54 hp/cu in)
- Compression ratio: 7:1
- Specific fuel consumption: 0.31 kg/kW/hr (0.51 lb/hp/hr) (take-off)
- Oil consumption: 0.0078 kg/kW/hr (0.013 lb/hp/hr)
- Power-to-weight ratio: 0.782 kW/kg (0.775 hp/lb)

== See also ==
Comparable engines

- BMW 132
- Bristol Pegasus
- Nakajima Hikari
- Wright R-1820 Cyclone

Related lists

- List of aircraft engines
