= Caproni Ca.133 =

Italian transport and bomber aircraft (1935–1948)

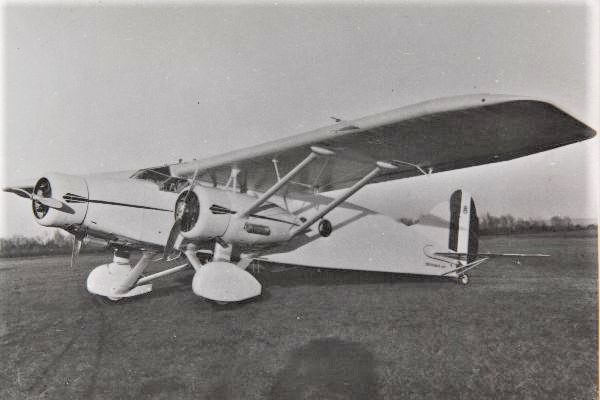

General information
- Type: Transport/Light bomber
- Manufacturer: Caproni
- Primary users: Regia Aeronautica Ala Littoria
- Number built: 505 + 1 prototype

History
- Introduction date: 1935
- First flight: 1934
- Retired: 1948

The Caproni Ca.133 was a three-engined transport/bomber aircraft used by the Italian Regia Aeronautica from the Second Italo-Abyssinian War until World War II.

Originally developed as a civilian airliner and successor to the Ca.101, the Ca.133 prototype first flew in December 1934, and production began in 1935. The military versions of the aircraft were used as transports and light bombers and saw action on all fronts.

A stretched transport version of the aircraft was produced as the Caproni Ca.148.

== Design ==
Designed by ingegnere Rodolfo Verduzio, the Caproni 133 was aerodynamically and structurally an improved Ca.101. Like its predecessor, the Ca.101, was a robust and inexpensive aircraft, designed to be easily maintained in difficult conditions and economical to operate. It had a welded steel-tube structure, mixed construction, with metal and fabric covering, main wheel spats, flaps and modified tail surfaces.

The wing was high-mounted, roughly elliptical, and made of wood and steel. The undercarriage was spatted and fixed. The aircraft was powered by three engines, one in the nose, and one under each wing mounted in faired nacelles, with NACA cowlings, supported by steel tubes.

The civil version could accommodate up to 16 passengers. It was used by Ala Littoria. The military version was widely used by Regia Aeronautica, mostly in Italian East Africa. As a bomber it incorporated two small internal bomb bays where it could hold up to 500 kg (1,100 lb). Larger ordnance could be mounted externally. It was armed with four 7.7 mm (.303 in) Breda-SAFAT machine guns, one dorsal, one ventral, and two lateral. Bomber aircraft operated as military transports, redesignated Ca 133T, had their interiors modified to accommodate 18 fully equipped soldiers.

== Operational service ==
=== Second Italo-Abyssinian War (1935–1936) ===
The Ca.133 was well-suited for colonial use, and it became the most successful of all Italian colonial aircraft.

The more advanced Savoia-Marchetti SM.81s were too valuable to be used in 'low level wars' and were also more costly. The war was thus fought mainly with the Ca.101, Ca.111 and Ca.133.

Around 100 Ca.133s took part in the conflict, and as well as 'normal' bombing and strafing, they were often equipped with mustard gas and Phosgene chemical bombs. These weapons were forbidden by the Geneva Protocol of 1925, but in this war (and in Libya) Italy ignored the convention.

The Ca.133s were also used as transports to support the army, as well as reconnaissance aircraft.

Without any air opposition, and flak almost exclusively based on small-calibre arms, air power was a decisive factor in Italy's final victory, culminating in the capture of Addis Ababa in early 1936. Even so, COIN (COunter INsurgency) operations continued until the start of World War II.

=== Spanish Civil War (1936–1939) ===
While in Ethiopia they were widely used, in Spain the Ca.133 was found to be too slow, and highly vulnerable to enemy Polikarpov I-15 and I-16 aircraft, also to heavy anti-aircraft fire.

=== World War II (1939–1945) ===
In mainland Italy, the Ca.133 was used mostly as a light transport aircraft supporting fighter and bomber squadrons by carrying supplies, personnel and spare parts. The Regia Aeronautica soon realized that due to improvements, the type was suitable for combat in North and East Africa. At the outbreak of war the Ca.133 equipped 14 Squadriglie da Bombardamento in these theatres.

In East Africa, it was still used as bomber and attack aircraft. Occasionally it even managed to shoot down enemy aircraft. On 12 June 1940, in the south region, three Ca.133s of 66ª Squadriglia from Yavello attacked an Allied column of half a dozen trucks and 200 men. Ca.133s of 65ª Squadriglia, from Neghelli, attacked the Allied positions around Moyale on two occasions, each time with three aircraft. That night, ten Caproni Ca.133s bombed the port of Aden and Khormaksar airfield, already attacked during daylight hours by seven SM.81s of 29° Gruppo. Three other Capronis attacked Cassala airfield in the Sudan. On 23 January 1941 a Ca.133 shot down an Avro Anson flown by Lt E.A. Gebhardt of 60 SAAF Squadron; the Anson crashed before anyone could bale out.

It was also used as an air ambulance with the Ca.133S (Sanitary) variant. Over 250 Ca.133s were in service in September 1939, when the war broke out. Some survived until the Armistice in 1943.

=== Postwar ===
A handful were retained for civilian service with the airline Ala Littoria. Some were exported to Austria.

The last Ca.133 was phased out by the Aeronautica Militare in 1947, and the last Ca.148 flew until 1956 with the Italian Aeroclub.

== Variants ==
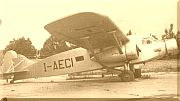
Caproni Ca.148

Ca.133
Bomber and transport; 76 aircraft produced
Ca.133S
Medical transport, 30 aircraft produced
Ca.133T
Troop transport, 283 aircraft produced
Ca.148
Stretched eight-seat civil/military transport, 54 aircraft produced

== Operators ==
=== Military operators ===
Austria

- Kommando Luftstreitkräfte received five aircraft.
  - Fliegerregiment 1
  - Fliegerregiment 2

Kingdom of Italy (Wartime)

- Regia Aeronautica
- Italian Co-Belligerent Air Force

Italian Social Republic

- Aeronautica Nazionale Repubblicana

Spain

- Spanish Air Force

United Kingdom (Wartime)

- Royal Air Force
  - No. 117 Squadron RAF

Italy (Postwar)

- Italian Air Force
  - Air Staff Liaison Flight

=== Civil operators ===
Italy

- Ala Littoria operated a fleet of at least twelve Ca.133s, using them on routes to East Africa.

== Specifications (Ca.133) ==
Data from World Encyclopedia of Civil Aircraft

General characteristics

- Crew: 5 (bomber); 2 (transport)
- Capacity: 16 pax (transport)
- Length: 15.36 m (50 ft 5 in)
- Wingspan: 21.24 m (69 ft 8 in)
- Height: 4 m (13 ft 1 in)
- Wing area: 65 m^{2} (700 sq ft)
- Empty weight: 4,190 kg (9,237 lb)
- Gross weight: 6,700 kg (14,771 lb)
- Powerplant: 3 × Piaggio Stella P.VII C.16 7-cylinder air-cooled radial piston engines, 343 kW (460 hp) each
- Propellers: 3-bladed variable-pitch propellers

Performance

- Maximum speed: 230 km/h (140 mph, 120 kn)
- Cruise speed: 200 km/h (120 mph, 110 kn)
- Range: 1,350 km (840 mi, 730 nmi)
- Service ceiling: 5,500 m (18,000 ft)
- Wing loading: 100 kg/m^{2} (20 lb/sq ft)
- Power/mass: 0.210 kW/kg (0.128 hp/lb)

Armament

- Guns: 4 × 7.7 mm (0.303 in) Breda-SAFAT machine guns
- Bombs: 1,200 kg (2,646 lb) of bombs

== See also ==
Related development

- Caproni Ca.101

Related lists

- List of aircraft of World War II
- List of bomber aircraft
- List of civil aircraft
- List of interwar military aircraft
- List of Regia Aeronautica aircraft used in World War II
