= CA-111 =

CA-111 may refer to:

- California State Route 111, a highway in the U.S. state of California
- Caproni Ca.111, an experimental aircraft
