= Ambrosini SAI.2S =

SAI.2S
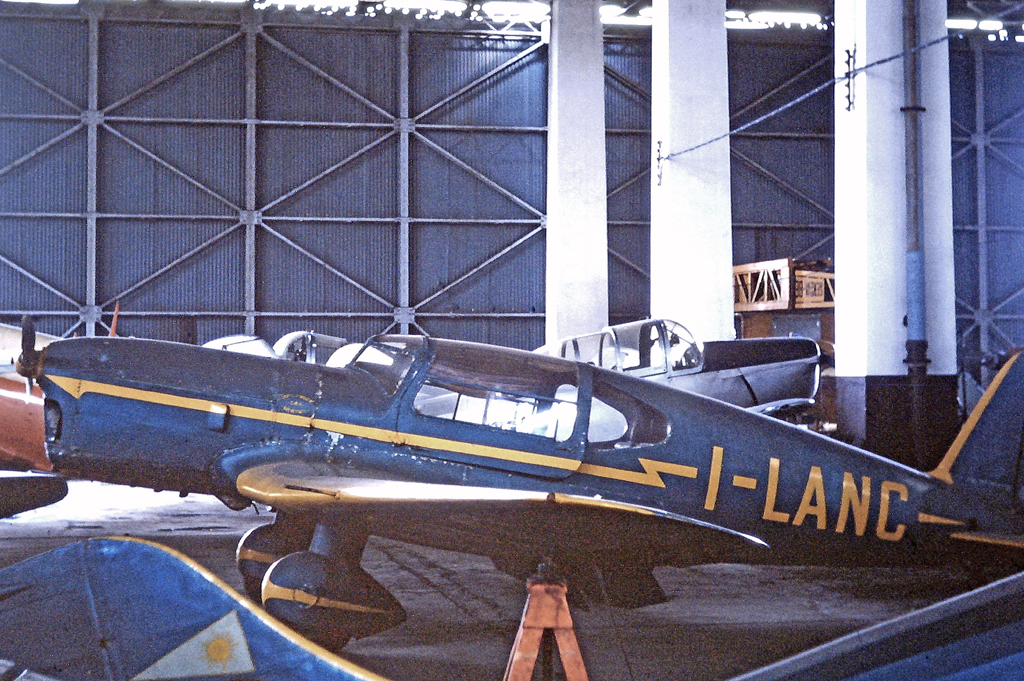
- Operational SAI 2S at Milan (Bresso) Airport in 1965

General information
- Type: Utility aircraft
- Manufacturer: Ambrosini
- Designer: Sergio Stefanutti
- Primary user: Private pilot owners

History
- First flight: 1937

The Ambrosini SAI.2S was a four-seat light aircraft produced in Italy shortly before World War II.

== Design and construction ==
It was a low-wing, cantilever cabin monoplane of conventional configuration with fixed, tailwheel undercarriage. It first appeared in 1937 and was initially powered by the Alfa Romeo 115-I engine of 185 horsepower (138 kW). At least one example was converted postwar with the de Havilland Gipsy Six Series II of 205 horsepower (153 kW).

The aircraft was primarily of wooden construction, the fuselage being a wooden monocoque and the two-spar wing having a duralumin-covered centre-section built integral with the fuselage and internally reinforced with steel tubes. The wing carried Handley Page slots and split flaps, and dual controls were fitted.

== Operation ==
The type was produced in small numbers, for use by private pilot owners. Two examples were operational in 1965. One aircraft was still extant as of 2006, and is preserved at the Gianni Caproni Museum of Aeronautics at Trento Airport.

Despite the similar designation, this design was unrelated to the earlier SAI.2

== Specifications ==
Data from Italian Civil and Military Aircraft 1930–1945

General characteristics

- Crew: One
- Capacity: Three passengers
- Length: 7.77 m (25 ft 6 in)
- Wingspan: 10.64 m (34 ft 11 in)
- Height: 2.79 m (9 ft 2 in)
- Wing area: 17.9 m^{2} (193 sq ft)
- Empty weight: 888 kg (1,958 lb)
- Gross weight: 1,417 kg (3,124 lb)
- Powerplant: 1 × Alfa Romeo 115-I air-cooled inverted straight-six engine, 150 kW (200 hp)

Performance

- Maximum speed: 249 km/h (155 mph, 135 kn)
- Cruise speed: 216 km/h (134 mph, 116 kn)
- Range: 969 km (602 mi, 523 nmi)
