= Fiat A.54 =

1930s Italian piston aircraft engine

A.54
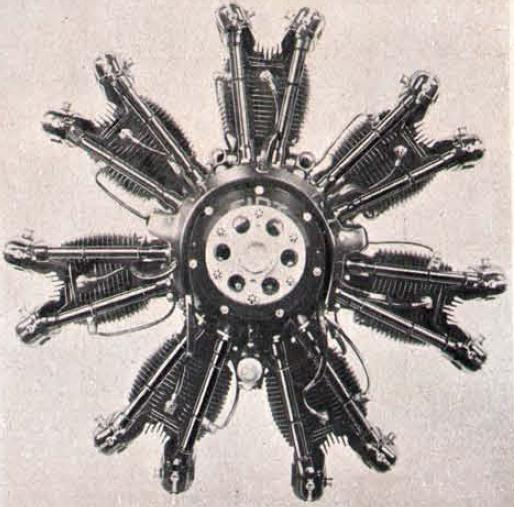
- Type: Piston engine
- Manufacturer: Fiat

The Fiat A.54 was a seven-cylinder, air-cooled radial engine developed in Italy in the 1930s as a powerplant for aircraft. Amongst others, it powered the Ambrosini SAI.1 and SAI.2 racing aircraft.

== Applications ==
- Ambrosini SAI.1
- Ambrosini SAI.2
- Caproni Ca.100
- FIAT G.2/4
- FIAT G.8
- Magni J.6
- Nuvoli N.5 Cab
- Savoia-Marchetti S.56

== Specifications ==
Data from

=== General characteristics ===
- Type: 7-cylinder air-cooled radial
- Bore: 105 mm (4.13 in)
- Stroke: 120 mm (4.72 in)
- Displacement: 7.27 L (443.9 cu in)
- Length: 1,770 mm (69.69 in)
- Width: 734 mm (28.93 in)
- Height: 1,065 mm (41.93 in)
- Dry weight: 150 kg (330.7 lb)

=== Components ===
- Valvetrain: One intake and one sodium-cooled exhaust valve per cylinder
- Fuel system: 1 Stromberg carburettor
- Fuel type: 74 octane
- Cooling system: Air-cooled

=== Performance ===
- Power output: 140 hp (104 kW) at 2,100 rpm
- Compression ratio: 5.5:1
- Power-to-weight ratio: 0.42 hp/lb (0.7 kW/kg)

== See also ==
Related lists

- List of aircraft engines
