= Ambrosini SS.4 =

Italian fighter prototype

SS.4
- The Ambrosini SS.4

General information
- Type: Fighter
- Manufacturer: SAI-Ambrosini
- Designer: Sergio Stefanutti
- Number built: 1

History
- First flight: 7 March 1939

The SAI-Ambrosini SS.4 was an Italian fighter prototype developed in the late 1930s, featuring a canard-style wing layout and a pusher propeller. Development of the SS.4 was abandoned after the prototype crashed on its second flight.

== Development ==
Sergio Stefanutti had already experimented with canard aircraft with the S.C.A. SS.2 and S.C.A. SS.3 Anitra ("Duck" (Note: Canard comes from the French word for 'duck' and the 1920s German canard design by Focke-Wulf, the Focke-Wulf F 19 Ente name also translated to 'duck',)), light aircraft built by Stabilimento Costruzioni Aeronautiche at Guidonia (a new municipality and location of a large Italian air force base).

The single-seat SS.2 had a canard wing configuration, fixed undercarriage, and was powered by a two-cylinder Keller engine rated at 16 hp (11.93 kW).

The SS.2 first flew in 1935, and one of the two prototypes was converted into a two-seater with a larger 38 hp (28.34 kW) CNA II engine built by Compagnia Nazionale Aeronautica. This new aircraft first took to the air on 2 October 1937, and was officially revealed in Milan at an international air exposition; the small fixed-undercarriage SS.2 was sent to Ambosini's facilities at Passignano sul Trasimeno for evaluation.

The SS.3 Anitra had a span of 12.77 m (41.9 ft), and was 6.00 m (19.7 ft) long, with an overall height of 2.01 m (6.6 ft). With a 16 hp (12 kW) engine, it was capable of a maximum speed of 87 mph (140 km/h) and able to reach an altitude of 13,120 ft (4,000 m). Stalling speed was 34 mph (55 km/h):

Experience with this machine and the study of its aerodynamics led Stefanutti to design a canard-style interceptor and air-superiority fighter, designated SS.4, very similar in layout to the SS.2 and SS.3.

A prototype SS.4 was built at the Società Aeronautica Italiana - Ambrosini factory in Passignano sul Trasimeno, Umbria. The first flight took place on 7 March 1939, but during its second flight next day, the aircraft crashed, killing Ambrosini's chief test pilot Ambrogio Colombo. A second prototype was ordered, but development priority was placed on more easily developed wooden aircraft, and the SS.4 design was abandoned in 1942.

== Design ==
The SS.4 was a single-seat fighter of all-metal construction with a canard configuration wing, with twin fins mounted on the wing trailing edges, retractable tricycle undercarriage, and short fuselage with a rear-mounted engine driving a pusher propeller.

The pilot was accommodated in an enclosed cockpit in the centre of the fuselage forward of the two fuel tanks and aft of the armament in the nose. Visibility from the cockpit was excellent to the sides and front, but restricted to the rear by the large main wing, engine, and large twin fins positioned at roughly the half-span position. Flying controls consisted of elevators on the trailing edges of the canard fore-plane controlling pitch, rudders on the large fins controlling yaw, and ailerons on the main wings to control roll. Pitch trim was set by adjusting a trim tab on the starboard elevator.

The moderately swept, tapered, high-aspect ratio wings had no sweep on the trailing edge and a cut-back to give clearance for the propeller, with the large fins with rudders extending past the trailing edge at the ends of the cut-backs, to ensure enough moment to give adequate control and stability. The delta fore-plane was of low aspect ratio with the elevators sited below the trailing edge similar to the method used by contemporary Junkers aircraft like the Junkers Ju 87.

The engine was a powerful, liquid-cooled Isotta Fraschini Asso XI R.C.40 engine capable of 960 hp (720 kW) driving a three-bladed metal propeller. The engine was cooled by two radiators either side of the fuselage in ducts just behind the cockpit. Fuel for the engine was housed in two fuel tanks located mid-fuselage, along with an oil tank.

Armament was to be two 20 mm (0.787 in) cannon and one 30 mm (1.181 in) cannon, clustered in the nose.

== Operational history ==
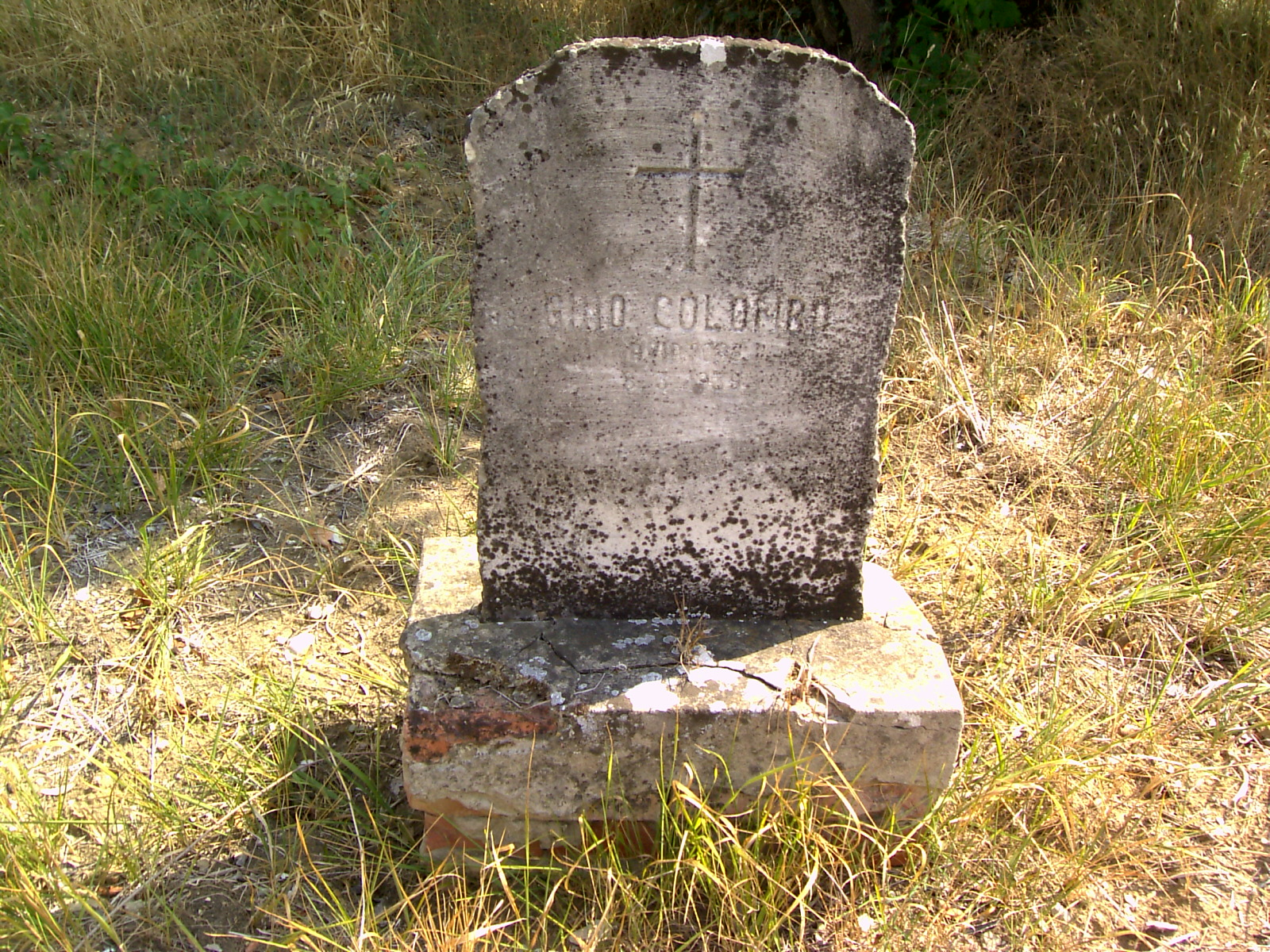
Colombo's memorial at the crash site also commemorates the "death" of the SS.4.

The prototype SS.4 was built by SAI Ambrosini, Passignano sul Trasimeno, and then sent to nearby Eleuteri airport, Castiglione del Lago, also in the Trasimeno area. There, the aircraft was successfully flown for the first time on 7 March 1939. The next day, the SS.4 prototype was scheduled to be transported to Aviano airbase by rail, but Ambrosini's chief test pilot, Ambrogio Colombo, wanted a second test flight. After 45 minutes, an aileron malfunctioned just 2 km (1.2 mi) from Eleuteri. Colombo attempted to land, but was unable to reach the runway and crashed near Campagna, hitting a tree. Colombo was killed when the engine pushed through the rear bulkhead and crushed him against the front of the cockpit.

A memorial to Colombo was erected near the site of the crash. The investigation into the crash concluded that the accident was due to imperfect construction, which led to a faulty installation of the aileron that had failed. The study also pointed out the excessive vibrations transmitted by the engine to the wing.

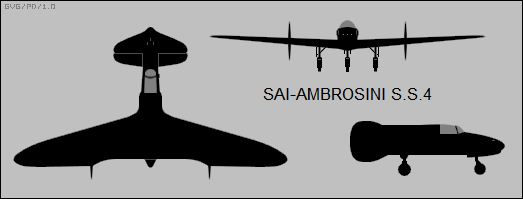

== Specifications (SS.4) ==
Data from Italian Civil and Military Aircraft 1930–1945

General characteristics

- Crew: 1
- Length: 6.74 m (22 ft 1 in)
- Wingspan: 12.32 m (40 ft 5 in)
- Height: 2.49 m (8 ft 2 in)
- Wing area: 17.5 m^{2} (188 sq ft)
- Gross weight: 2,449 kg (5,400 lb)
- Powerplant: 1 × Isotta Fraschini Asso XI R.C.40 V-12 liquid-cooled piston engine, 720 kW (960 hp)
- Propellers: 3-bladed metal pusher propeller

Performance

- Maximum speed: 571 km/h (355 mph, 308 kn)
- Stall speed: 110 km/h (68 mph, 59 kn)

Armament

- Guns: 2 × 20 mm cannon, 1 × 30 mm cannon (mounted in nose)

== See also ==
Aircraft of comparable role, configuration, and era

- Curtiss-Wright XP-55 Ascender
- Kyushu J7W
- Miles M.35 Libellula
- Northrop XP-56 Black Bullet
- SAAB 21
- Vultee XP-54 Swoose Goose
