= Jona J-6 =

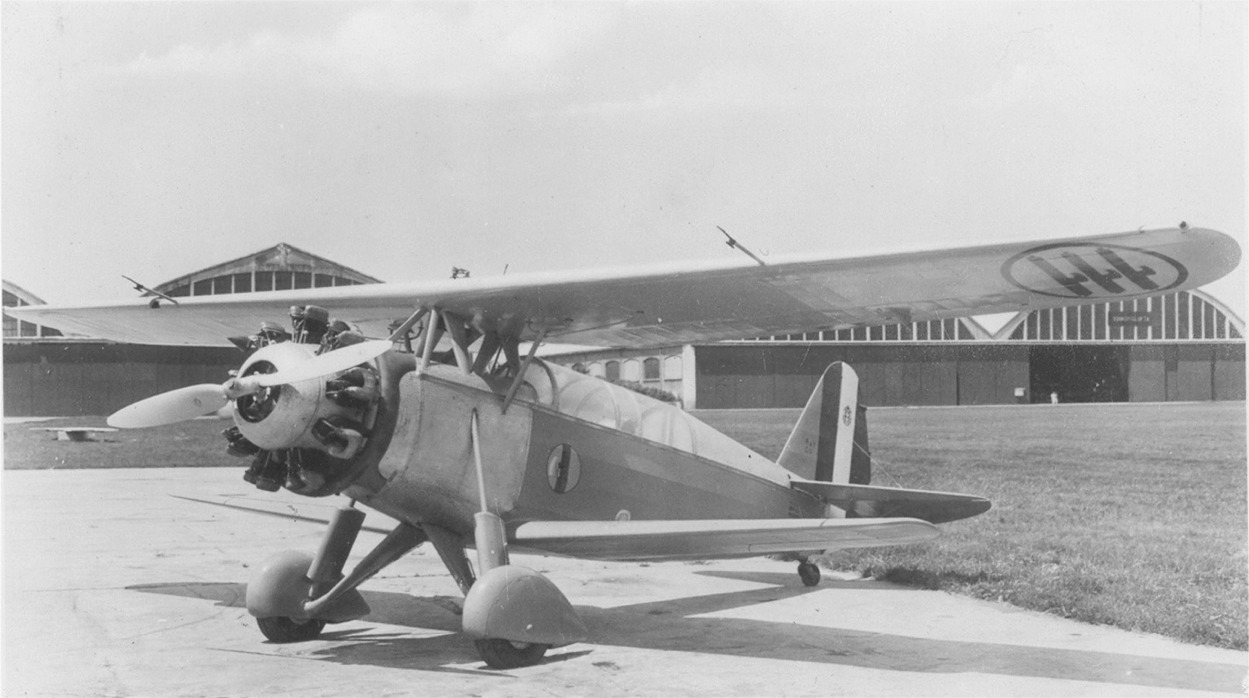
- Jona J-6S

General information
- Type: Experimental sequiplane
- National origin: Italy
- Manufacturer: Jona
- Designer: Alberto Jona
- Number built: 7, including the J-6S

History
- First flight: 24 May 1936

The Jona J-6 was an experimental Italian sesquiplane built in 1936 to demonstrate a novel, tilting wing stabilisation system. A military trainer development without the moving wing was produced in small numbers.

== Design and development ==
The Jona J-6 was a very unusual design: not only was it a cantilever sesquiplane, its lower wing having a span about two thirds that of the upper wing and having a narrower chord but, uniquely, the upper plane was mounted to the fuselage so that it could tilt about a longitudinal axis with respect to the rest of the aircraft. The objective was lateral stability; the ailerons were linked to the fuselage so that if the port wing was raised by a gust its aileron was also raised and that of the starboard wing lowered, automatically correcting the roll.

Because the upper wing tilted, it had to be a cantilever structure. It was built around two wooden spars and was mounted at its centre on a chordwise circular cross-section rod, fixed to the fuselage, which acted as a hinge and allowed the wing to see-saw. When the Jona J-6 appeared at the Milan show in 1935, the year before its first flight, this hinge was held above the fuselage on a faired column, but before it flew this was replaced by four pairs of faired V-form struts with their eight ends fixed to it. Control wires from the ailerons were attached to the fixed hinge rod, providing the required automatic deflections as the wing tilted. The rate of tilt was limited by a pair of telescopic, sprung struts from mid-chord quite close to the centreline, which met at the bottom centre of the fuselage after passing in through the upper sides. These could be hydraulically locked for aerobatics and spins or when stabilisation was not wanted. Leading edge automatic Handley Page slots were fitted to prevent spinning via wingtip stalling. The wing was plywood-covered and straight-tapered in plan form, with semi-elliptical tips. The lower wing was generally similar, though much smaller and rigidly mounted. Though not required when the automatic lateral control system was engaged, conventional, pilot operated ailerons were later added to the lower wing.

The fuselage was built around a rectangular section steel tube structure, shaped into an oval with metal covering forward of the lower wing leading edge and for the decking behind the cockpit, with fabric elsewhere. At the front a 140 hp (104 kW) Fiat A.54 radial engine was mounted forward of the fuselage within a Townend ring. The tandem cockpits were under continuous glazing with the forward seat under the midwing, where a large cutout eased visibility. The glazing was faired into the rear decking. The externally braced tailplane had a swept, straight leading edge and was mounted on top of the fuselage. It carried separate elevators, between which moved a deep, curved edged rudder.

The mainwheels of the J-6 were mounted on split axles from the lower central fuselage, with shock absorbers fixed to the upper longerons. The wheels were spatted and the shock absorbers, though not their upper extension rods, were faired. The conventional undercarriage had a steerable, partly faired tailskid.

The Jona J-6 first flew on 24 May 1936. Its designer claimed that it could be flown without using the rudder, which was only needed on takeoff or landing. It could not be spun or side-slipped when the upper wing was free to move, though with the wing locked it could be spun and looped at will.

After successfully completing its flight testing, the J-6 prototype was bought by the Italian government, though no more were built. It was transferred to the civil register and was flown by Leonardo Bonzi until its registration was cancelled in 1943.

The prototype of a development, the J-6S, built for Jona by Piero Magni Aviazione was flying by 1938. This aircraft, intended as a military trainer, was powered by a 240 hp (180 kW) Alfa Romeo D2C.30 radial engine and did not have the tilting wing but was otherwise closely similar to the J-6. The J-6S lacked a Townend ring cowling on the nine-cylinder radial, was slightly shorter with the front cockpit set slightly further aft and had a tailwheel instead of a skid. Six J-6S were built and used by the Staff Training Squadron at Centocelle Airport. One was armed in April 1940. They were later stored at Milan-Bresso and destroyed in an air raid in early 1942.

== Variants ==
J-6
Built to test the stabilising wing system.
J-6S
Military trainer development with conventional wing and more powerful engine. Six delivered to Italian Air Force.

== Specifications (J-6) ==
Data from Jane's All the World's Aircraft 1938

General characteristics

- Capacity: two
- Length: 7.4 m (24 ft 3 in)
- Upper wingspan: 10.2 m (33 ft 6 in)
- Lower wingspan: 6.71 m (22 ft 0 in)
- Height: 2.55 m (8 ft 4 in)
- Wing area: 18.3 m^{2} (197 sq ft) total
- Empty weight: 645 kg (1,422 lb)
- Gross weight: 970 kg (2,138 lb)
- Powerplant: 1 × Fiat A.54 7-cylinder radial, 100 kW (140 hp)
- Propellers: 2-bladed metal, fixed pitch

Performance

- Maximum speed: 200 km/h (120 mph, 110 kn)
- Stall speed: 80 km/h (50 mph, 43 kn)
- Endurance: 7 hr with 2 crew plus baggage
- Rate of climb: 4.2 m/s (830 ft/min) to 1,000 m (3,050 ft)
