= Ambrosini SAI.1 =

SAI 1

General information
- Type: Racing aircraft
- Manufacturer: Ambrosini
- Designer: Sergio Stefanutti
- Number built: 1

History
- First flight: 1935

The Ambrosini SAI 1 was a two-seat biplane aircraft built in Italy to compete in the 1935 Avioraduno del Littorio ("Littorio Aviation Rally)" air rally. It was of conventional configuration, and featured a neatly cowled radial engine and a long canopy fairing for added streamlining.

== Specifications ==
General characteristics

- Crew: one pilot
- Capacity: 1 passenger
- Length: 6.5 m (21 ft 4 in)
- Wingspan: 8.6 m (28 ft 2 in)
- Height: 2.5 m (8 ft 2 in)
- Wing area: 17.2 m^{2} (185 sq ft)
- Empty weight: 610 kg (1,350 lb)
- Gross weight: 930 kg (2,050 lb)
- Powerplant: 1 × Fiat A.54 radial , 100 kW (140 hp)

Performance

- Maximum speed: 220 km/h (140 mph, 120 kn)
