= Macchi M.C.99 =

M.C.99
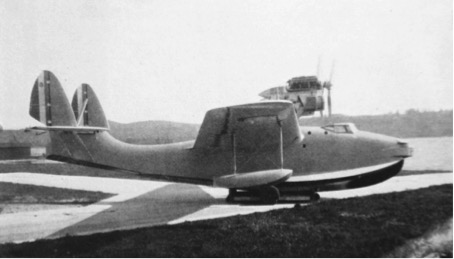

General information
- Type: Torpedo-bomber flying boat
- Manufacturer: Macchi
- Number built: 1

History
- First flight: 1937

The Macchi M.C.99 was a prototype 1930s Italian twin-engined torpedo-bomber flying boat designed and built by Macchi.

== Development ==
The M.C.99 was designed by Mario Castoldi as a military flying boat, resembling the earlier commercial M.C.94 and was a wooden twin-engined shoulder-wing cantilever monoplane. Constructed mainly of wood, it was a high-wing cantilever monoplane flying boat. With a crew of five, it had an enclosed cabin and had defensive gun positions in the bow, amidships and in the tail. The prototype and only M.C.99 was powered by two 890 kW (1,190 hp) Isotta Fraschini Asso XI R.2C.15 engines, strut-mounted above the wings. Briefly flown in 1937 it did not enter production.

== Specifications ==
Data from Orbis.

General characteristics

- Crew: five
- Wingspan: 25.34 m (83 ft 2 in)
- Max takeoff weight: 11,600 kg (25,574 lb)
- Powerplant: 2 × Isotta Fraschini Asso XI R.2C.15 water-cooled, supercharged V12 piston engine, 660 kW (890 hp) each

Performance

- Maximum speed: 282 km/h (175 mph, 152 kn)
- Range: 3,000 km (1,900 mi, 1,600 nmi)

Armament

- Guns: 4 x light machine-guns
- Bombs: either 1500kg of bombs or two torpedoes.

== See also ==
Related lists

- List of seaplanes and flying boats
