= Ambrosini S.1001 =

Italian light airplane shortly after the end of World War II

S.1001 Grifo
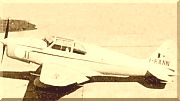
- S.1001 Grifo

General information
- Type: Utility aircraft
- Manufacturer: Ambrosini

History
- First flight: 1947

The Ambrosini S.1001 Grifo ("Griffin") was an Italian light airplane that appeared shortly after the end of World War II. The first plane built by SAI Ambrosini postwar, the prototype flew in 1947 and was derived from the pre-war SAI.2S. It was a four-seat monoplane with spatted fixed undercarriage. A small series was produced for the Italian aeroclubs with an Alfa Romeo 110-ter engine of 97 kW (130 hp). Three examples were even bought by the Italian Aeronautica Militare (AMI), which used them between 1948 and 1950.

== Distance record ==
From 28 to 29 April 1948, Leonardo Bonzi and Maner Lualdi established a distance record for aircraft in this class, flying from Campoformido, Italy to Massawa, Eritrea - 4,650 km (2,890 mi) without stopover. On January 10, 1949, on board the same aircraft, now christened Angelo dei Bimbi, they headed for Dakar in an attempt to reach South America. After having overcome the opposition of the French authorities, they took off from Yoff on January 29, 1949, dispensing with radio and parachutes to be able to load 800 litres (176 imp gal, 211 us gal) of fuel. Seventeen hours later, they were in Parnaiba, Brazil.

By the end of a triumphal tour through Brazil, Uruguay and Argentina, they had collected 500 million lire from the Italian community living in these countries to contribute to the economic restarting of Italy. Their plane I-ASSI is preserved today at the Museum Romeo Esparto of Milan-Arese.

== Variants ==
S.1002 Trasimeno

A two-seater version powered by a de Havilland Gipsy Major of 120 kW (160 hp) was offered to the AMI as a trainer. The AMI were not interested, but a few aircraft were built as the S.1002 Trasimeno for aeroclubs.

== Operators ==
Italy

- Italian Air Force operated three aircraft until the 1950s

== Specifications (S.1001) ==
Data from Jane's All The World's Aircraft 1951–52

General characteristics

- Crew: one, pilot
- Capacity: 3 passengers
- Length: 7.80 m (25 ft 7 in)
- Wingspan: 9.90 m (32 ft 6 in)
- Height: 2.76 m (9 ft 1 in)
- Wing area: 15.2 m^{2} (164 sq ft)
- Empty weight: 700 kg (1,543 lb)
- Max takeoff weight: 1,060 kg (2,337 lb)
- Fuel capacity: 140 litres (37 US gal; 31 imp gal)
- Powerplant: 1 × Alfa Romeo 110 4-cylinder inverted air-cooled piston engine, 97 kW (130 hp)

Performance

- Maximum speed: 240 km/h (150 mph, 130 kn)
- Cruise speed: 210 km/h (130 mph, 110 kn)
- Range: 850 km (530 mi, 460 nmi)
- Service ceiling: 5,000 m (16,000 ft)
- Rate of climb: 3.5 m/s (690 ft/min)
- Time to altitude: 16 minutes to 4,000 m (13,000 ft)

== See also ==
Aircraft of comparable role, configuration, and era

- Miles Falcon
