= Caproni Ca.101 =

Ca.101
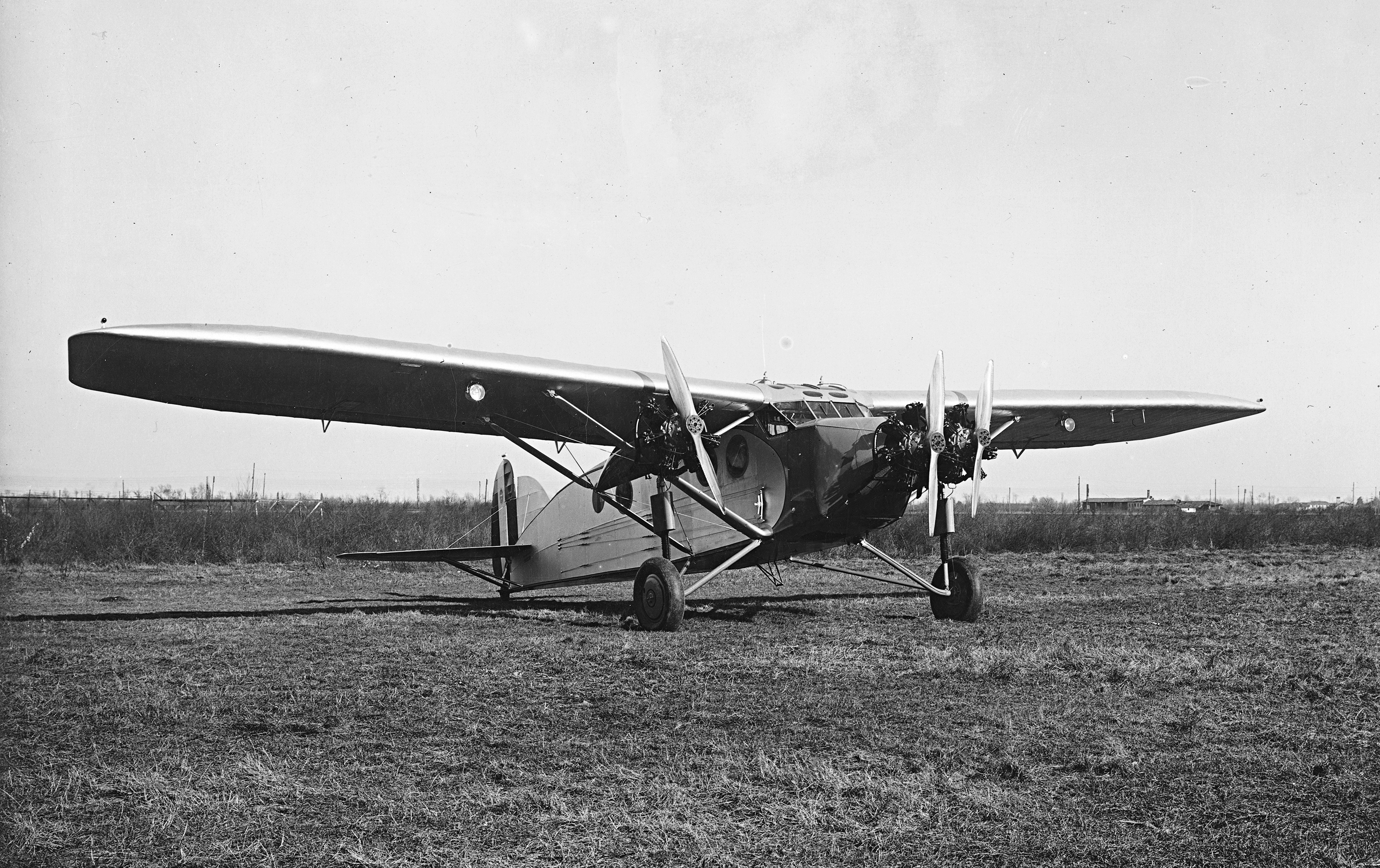
- Caproni Ca.101

General information
- Type: Transport/bomber
- Manufacturer: Caproni
- Designer: Rodolfo Verduzio
- Primary user: Regia Aeronautica

History
- First flight: 1928
- Retired: 1939

The Caproni Ca.101 was a three-engine Italian airliner which later saw military use as a transport and bomber. It was designed in 1927 and first flown in 1928.

== Design and development ==
The Ca.101 was a derivative of the Caproni Ca.97, with an enlarged airframe, which increased the payload from 574 kg (1,265 lb) to 800 kg (1,760 lb). This made the payload 20% of the maximum weight, compared to only 9% for the Ca.74G, which was heavier, smaller and inferior in performance.

Initially planned as a civil airliner, it was soon converted to the bomber/transport role. The aircraft was a typical 1920s design. It had three engines, one in the nose and one under each wing, high wings and a fixed undercarriage. The fuselage, of quadrangular cross-section, was made of steel tubes covered with fabric, as were the wings and tail. The floor was made of wood.

It was initially fitted with the 149 kW (200 hp) Armstrong Siddeley Lynx engine, driving a two-bladed metal propeller 2.88 m (9.45 ft) in diameter. The 1,200 L (317 US gal) fuel tank was located in the upper part of the central fuselage. Fuel was fed to the engines by means of copper pipes. All three engines had 44 L (12 US gal) of oil in a tank located behind the engine. The compressed air and fire extinguisher systems were also centrally located.

A variety of engines were used, sometimes with a composite layout: The Piaggio P.VII (276 kW/370 hp), the Alfa Romeo Jupiter (313 kW/420 hp), and other models of 179 kW (240 hp) and 201 kW (270 hp).

Exports of the Ca.101 were made to Australia, China and Paraguay. Hungary bought 20 aircraft for use as air mail aircraft.

The Ca.101bis, designed for use in Italy's colonies, had a slightly larger (56 m^{2}/603 ft^{2} wing area, 19.7 m/64.6 ft span and 13.54 m/44.42 ft length) and was heavier than the original model. It had an empty weight of 3,000 kg (6,610 lb), and a payload of 1,986 kg (4,378 lb).

It was fitted with an Alfa Romeo Jupiter in the nose, and an Armstrong Siddeley Lynx under each wing, giving it over 597 kW (800 hp) in total. The ceiling was improved to 5,500 m (18,045 ft), but the greater drag and weight reduced the maximum speed to 205 km/h (127 mph), and the endurance to only six hours.

The D2 version, was produced replacing the motors with three more powerful Alfa Romeo D.2 motors. In operations in Eritrea, they guaranteed good performance in the tropics. From the opening of hostilities in East Africa in 1935, various versions of the Ca. 101 were used during all of the conflict, carrying out tactical support missions for the infantry and bombing. The D.2 version, in particular, operated with the 14th Bomber Flight "Hic Sunt Leones" and 15th Bomber Flight "La Disperata" of the 4th Bombers Squadron.

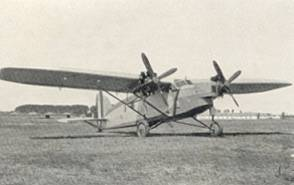
Caproni Ca.102

A further development was the Ca.102, with the original airframe, but only two Bristol Jupiter engines, fitted with four-blade propellers, delivering 746 kW (1,000 hp). This greatly enhanced the performance of the aircraft, almost to the level of the three-engined Ca.133. It had a maximum speed of 234 km/h (145 mph), ceiling of 6,000 m (19,690 ft), payload of 1,800 kg (3,968 lb) and an empty weight of 2,500 kg (5,510 lb). The Ca.102 carried an additional 600 L (159 US gal) of fuel in a mid-fuselage tank under the passenger seats.

The removal of the engine in the nose made the aircraft more aerodynamic, improved visibility for the pilots, and allowed the fitting of four machine guns. Its long slim nose, housing the bombsight, gained it the nickname Pinocchio.

An interesting development was the Ca.102quarter, a four-engine variant, with two engines on each wing, one facing forwards, the other backwards, all with two-blade propellers. Only one model was built, as performance was unimpressive.

== Operational service ==
The Regia Aeronautica ordered 72 Ca.101 and 34 Ca.102. These aircraft served with 8 and 9 Wing (Ca.102) and 7 Wing (Ca.101).

Though the Ca.102 was more advanced, only the Ca.101 served in the Second Italo-Abyssinian War. Though vulnerable to small arms fire, the aircraft proved generally effective. Several were also used as airliners, flying from Italy to Africa.

In 1939, the Regia Aeronautica retired their Ca.101's. The Ca.102's were apparently retired before that, possibly because the twin-engine layout gave less overall reliability.

== Variants ==
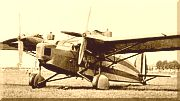
Caproni Ca.102

- Ca.101 – Production model
  - Ca.101bis – Slightly larger and with more powerful engines designed for colonial service.
- Ca.102 – Ca.101 airframe with two Bristol Jupiter engines (34 built)
  - Ca.102quarter – Ca.102 with four engines (one built)

== Operators ==
=== Civil operators ===
Kingdom of Italy

- Ala Littoria
- Società Aerea Mediterranea
- Società Nord-Africa Aviazione

=== Military operators ===
Austria
China

- Republic of China Air Force

Kingdom of Italy

- Regia Aeronautica

Hungary

- Royal Hungarian Air Force

== Specifications (Ca.101) ==
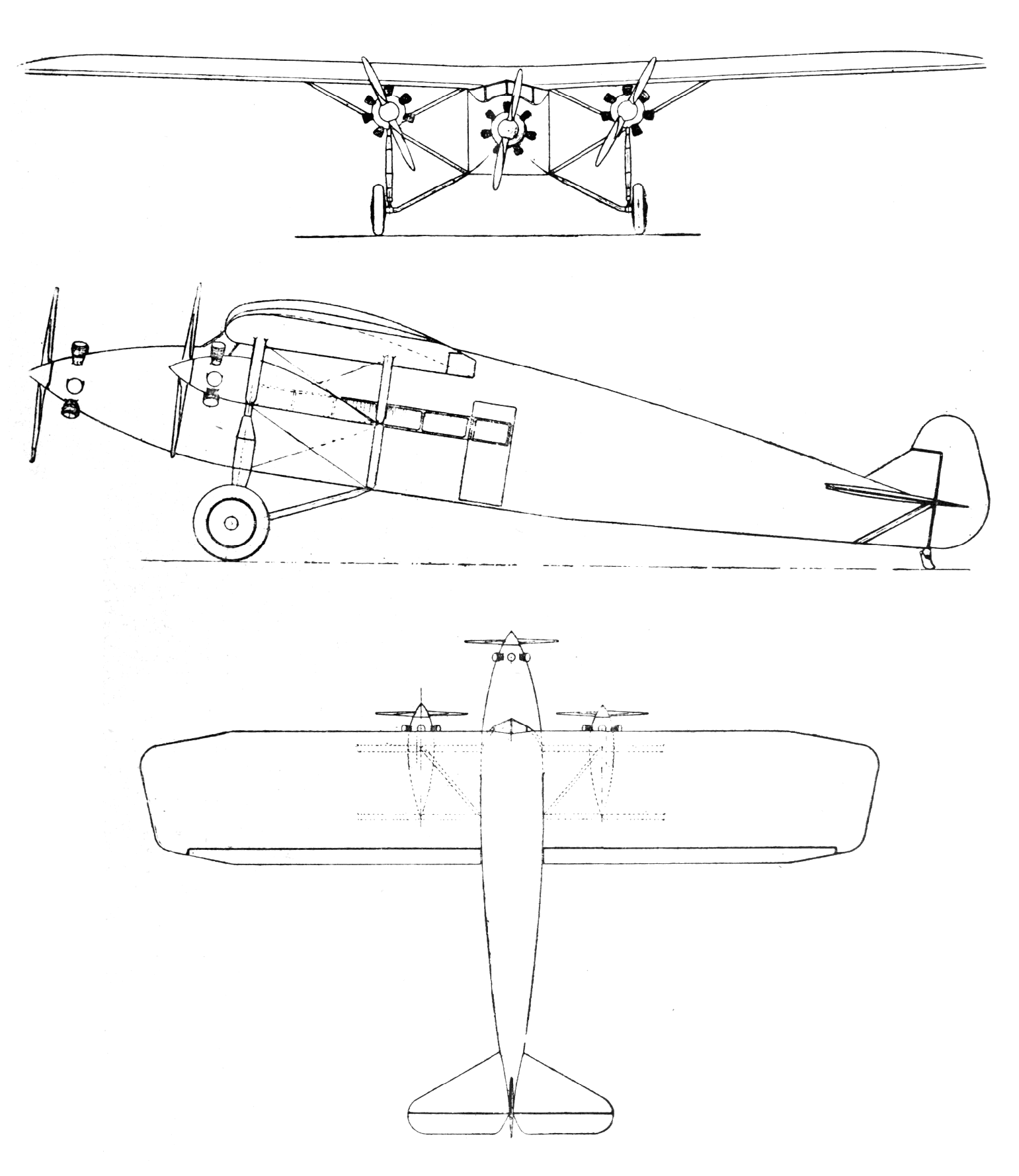
Caproni Ca.101 3-View drawing from L'Air January 1, 1929

General characteristics

- Crew: three (pilot, co-pilot, gunner/observer)
- Capacity: eight soldiers or four wounded or 1,500 kg (3,300 lb) of cargo
- Length: 13.5 m (44 ft 4 in)
- Wingspan: 18.8 m (61 ft 8 in)
- Height: 3.6 m (11 ft 10 in)
- Wing area: 52 m^{2} (560 sq ft)
- Empty weight: 2,450 kg (5,390 lb)
- Gross weight: 3,950 kg (8,690 lb)
- Powerplant: 3 × Alfa Romeo licence-built Armstrong Siddeley Lynx , 149 kW (200 hp) each

Performance

- Maximum speed: 210 km/h (130 mph, 110 kn)
- Range: 1,000 km (621 mi, 540 nmi)
- Service ceiling: 5,000 m (16,400 ft)
- Rate of climb: 2.6 m/s (512 ft/min)

Armament

- 2 × 7.7 mm (.303 in) Lewis Guns in the nose and ventral position. There was sometimes a twin forward installation and a dorsal defensive turret mounted.
- 250 × 2 kg (4.4 lb) or 40 × 12 kg (26.4 lb) bombs carried internally.

== See also ==
Related development

- Caproni Ca.97
- Caproni Ca.111

Aircraft of comparable role, configuration, and era

- Ford Trimotor
- Fokker F.VII

Related lists

- List of Interwar military aircraft
- List of Regia Aeronautica aircraft used in World War II
