= Breda Ba.25 =

Italian two-seat biplane trainer

Ba.25
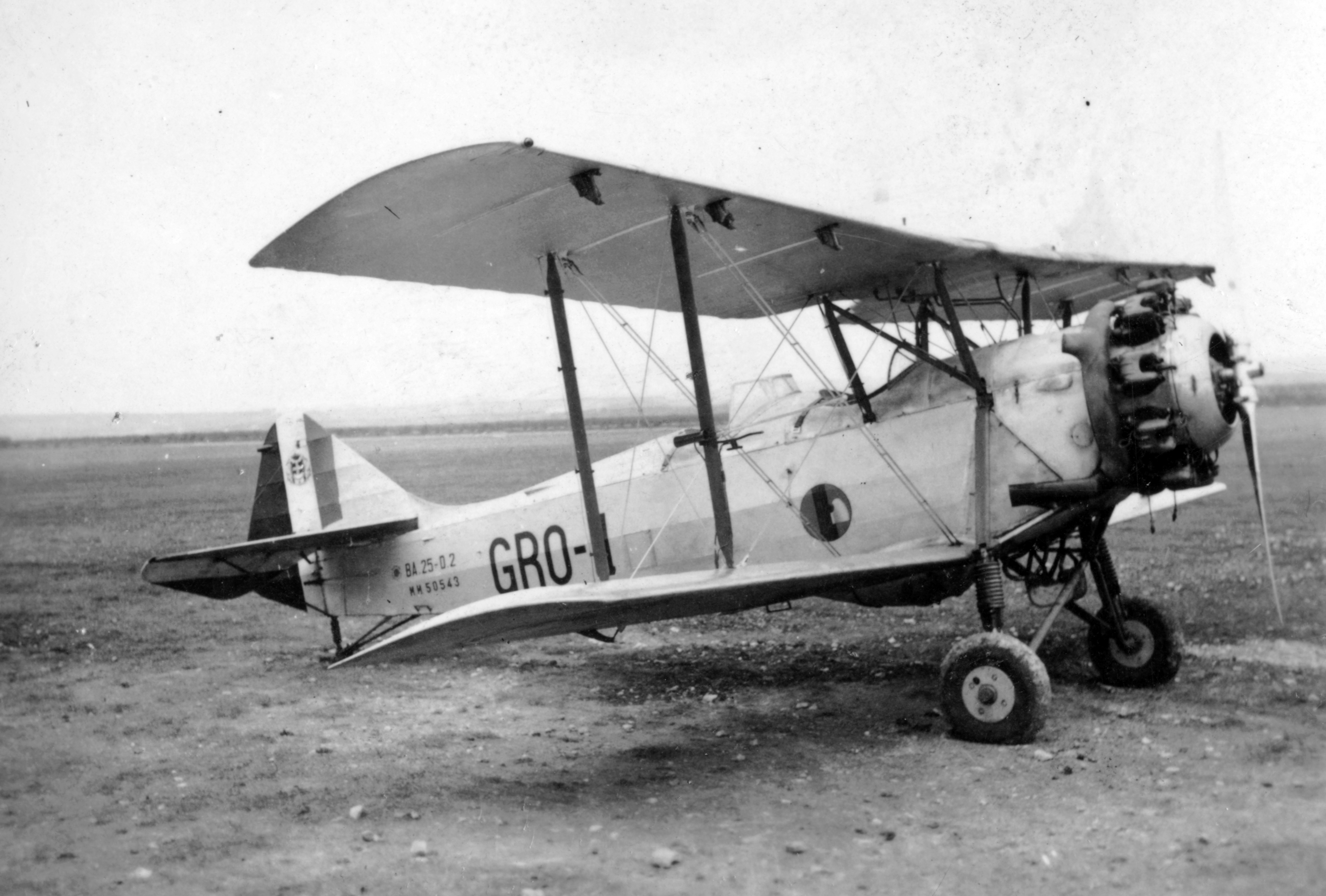
- Ba.25/D.2 of Regia Aeronautica

General information
- Type: Trainer aircraft
- Manufacturer: Società Italiana Ernesto Breda
- Primary users: Regia Aeronautica Royal Hungarian Air Force
- Number built: 763 + 3 prototypes

History
- Manufactured: 1931–1938
- Introduction date: 1932
- First flight: 1931

The Breda Ba.25 was an Italian two-seat biplane trainer designed and built by the Breda company. It was the most widely used Italian basic trainer of the 1930s.

== Design and development ==
The first flight took place near Milan in 1931. Initially designed as a single-seat aircraft, the prototype was later converted to a two-seat fuselage. Flight testing of the two-seat variant was successful, and in late 1931 Regia Aeronautica ordered a series of 100 Ba.25 training aircraft. The student and instructor sat in open tandem cockpits, although some versions had a single-bay cockpit.

The initial production order was completed by 1935, but demand for the aircraft increased and production for the Regia Aeronautica totalled 719 by the end of 1938. Many others were produced for export or for private use with different radial engines like the Alfa Romeo Lynx or Walter Castor.

== Operational history ==
The Ba.25 remained in service of the Regia Aeronautica as a training aircraft during World War II. Some of the aircraft were seized and handed over to the Allies. Paraguay bought four Breda Ba.25, one of them a Ba.25Idro. They were used as primary trainers from 1939 to 1945.

== Variants ==
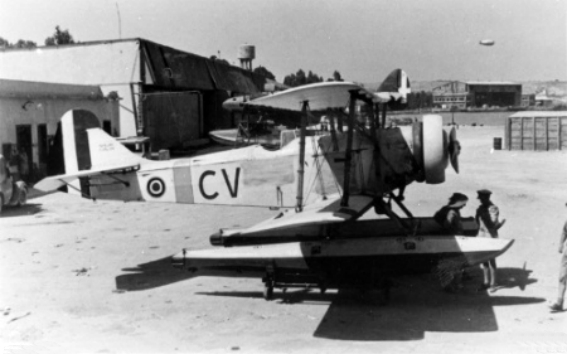
Ba.25 in single-seat seaplane configuration.

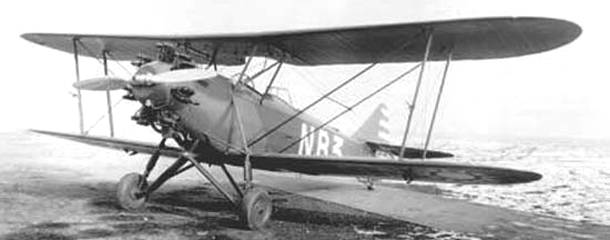
Ba.28 in Republic of China Air Force (Nationalist Chinese) service.

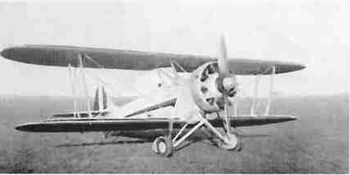
Ba.28

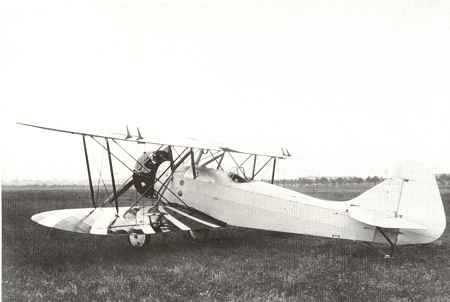
A Ba.28 prior to application of its markings, probably just after completion by the factory.

There were many minor variants:

Ba.25
Main production version.
Ba.25/Lynx
Fitted with a 149 kW (200 hp) Alfa Romeo Lynx engine.
Ba.25/D.2
Fitted with a 179 kW (240 hp) Alfa Romeo D2 engine.
Ba.25/Mezzo-Asso
Fitted with a 164 kW (220 hp) Isotta Fraschini Asso 200 engine.
Ba.25 Ridotto'
Reduced-span aerobatic version.
Ba.25-I (I for Idro)
Floatplane version (42 built, one for Paraguayan Naval Aviation)
Ba.26
Primary trainer with a longer wingspan and Walter NZ 120 engine, prototype only.
Ba.28
Export version with Piaggio-built Gnome-Rhône 7K engine for Norway, China and Ethiopia, among others.

The Ba.28 training aircraft was developed from the earlier Ba.25. It was also a biplane with a new, more powerful Piaggio Stella P.VII Z radial engine of 272 kW (365 hp) and had ailerons on the upper wing. In June 1936 the prototype was shown at the air show in Venice. The Italian Air Force in the same year ordered a series of 50 aircraft. During use in flight schools the Ba.28 proved not to be among the best – it was difficult to manage in the air. However, orders for the type arrived from abroad – were duly delivered to the following countries: Afghanistan (2), China (18), Norway (6), Austria (12) and Spain (6).

== Operators ==
Kingdom of Afghanistan

- Afghan Air Force

Austria

- Austrian Air Force (1927-1938)

Bolivia

- Bolivian Air Force operated 6 aircraft (1939)

China

- Republic of China Air Force

Ecuador

- Ecuadorian Air Force

Ethiopia

- Ethiopian Air Force

Hungary

- Royal Hungarian Air Force operated 3 aircraft

Kingdom of Italy

- Regia Aeronautica
- Aviazione Legionaria
- Italian Co-Belligerent Air Force

Italy

- Aeronautica Nazionale Repubblicana

Norway

- Royal Norwegian Navy Air Service

Paraguay

- Paraguayan Military Aviation used three Ba.25.
- Paraguayan Naval Aviation used one Ba.25 Idro.

Spain

- Spanish Air Force

== Specifications (Ba.25) ==
Data from

General characteristics

- Crew: 2
- Length: 7.80 m (25 ft 7 in) (Breda 25 Idro – 9.1 m (29.86 ft))
- Wingspan: 9.98 m (32 ft 9 in)
- Height: 2.8278 m (9 ft 3.33 in) (Breda 25 Idro – 3.6 m (11.81 ft))
- Wing area: 25.0 m^{2} (269 sq ft)
- Empty weight: 788 kg (1,738 lb)
- Gross weight: 2,288 kg (5,044 lb)
- Powerplant: 1 × Alfa Romeo D2 9-cyl. air-cooled radial piston engine, 180 kW (240 hp)

Performance

- Maximum speed: 205 km/h (127 mph, 111 kn)
- Cruise speed: 195 km/h (121 mph, 105 kn) (Breda 25 Idro – 150 km/h (93 mph))
- Stall speed: 71 km/h (44 mph, 38 kn) (Breda 25 Idro – 90 km/h (56 mph))
- Range: 500 km (310 mi, 270 nmi)
- Service ceiling: 7,500 m (24,600 ft)
- Rate of climb: 2.87 m/s (565 ft/min)

== See also ==
Aircraft of comparable role, configuration, and era

- de Havilland Tiger Moth
- Naval Aircraft Factory N3N
- Yokosuka K5Y

Related lists

- List of Interwar military aircraft
