= Pier Ugo Gobbato =

Italian racing driver, engineer and general manager of Ferrari

- Born: Pier Ugo Gobbato; 12 June 1918; Florence, Kingdom of Italy
- Died: 20 December 2008 (aged 90); Turin, Italy
- Education: Polytechnic University of Milan
- Parent(s): Ugo Gobbato, Dianella Mairsaj

Mille Miglia
- Years active: 1937 – 1939; 1952
- Teams: Scuderia Ferrari

Pier Ugo Gobbato (12 June 1918 – 20 December 2008) was an Italian racing driver, engineer and general manager of Ferrari and Lancia.

== Early life and career ==
Pier Ugo Gobbato was born on 12 June 1918 in Florence, Italy, son of Ugo Gobbato and Dianella Mairsaj. In 1919 the family moved to Turin, his father Ugo started working at Fiat, becoming the first director of the Lingotto factory, with the task of organizing the conversion of plants from war production to civil production. In 1924 Gobbato attended elementary school in Turin and high school at the Real Collegio Carlo Alberto, Moncalieri. In 1936 he attended the Politecnico di Milano.

=== Car racing ===
In 1937 he participated in the Mille Miglia with Mario Camellini on Fiat 508 CS Balilla Sport n. 42 (Turismo Category 701-1,100 cc) made by Scuderia Ferrari. Retired after Florence.
