= Caproni Ca.111 =

1930s Italian recon aircraft and light bomber

Ca.111
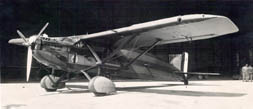
- Caproni Ca.111bis

General information
- Type: Reconnaissance aircraft and light bomber
- Manufacturer: Caproni
- Designer: Rodolfo Verduzio
- Primary user: Regia Aeronautica
- Number built: 152 + 2 prototypes

History
- First flight: February 1932

The Caproni Ca.111 was a long-range reconnaissance aircraft and light bomber produced in Italy during the 1930s. It was a derivative of the Ca.101.

== Design and development ==
A robust and simple aircraft, it was meant to be used in harsh conditions with minimal support. It was designed by the engineer Rodolfo Verduzio of Gianni Caproni in 1931, and first flew in February 1932 as MM 205.

This aircraft was a high-wing monoplane, built with a robust but simple structure consisting of a tubular steel skeleton with a fabric and wood skin. Derived from the earlier Ca.101, it used a different engine. The fuselage was of square section, and the wing was practically rectangular, with the extremities sloped and the ailerons running the whole length of the trailing edge. Steel tubing was also used for the undercarriage. This was fixed and had a complex structure that had two legs supported by several steel tubes between the fuselage and the wings.

The crew consisted of three men. The pilot, a co-pilot/observer and a flight engineer/gunner.

The main innovation was the engine. While the previous Ca.101 had three units, the newer type had only one. This was a risk because the engines of the time were not very reliable. It seems that the gamble paid off as the Ca.111 was faster than the three-engine Ca.101 and even the Ca.133. The engine was a water-cooled Isotta Fraschini Asso 750RC 18-cylinder in a 'W' layout. The first examples were equipped with a four-blade wooden propeller. Later models were fitted with a three-blade metal propeller with variable pitch. The required pitch had to be set on the ground and was not variable in flight. It was heavier and more expensive but provided a worthwhile improvement.

Fuel capacity was 1,960 L (446 US gal) in two tanks, one of 1,060 L (280 US gal) and two of 450 L (116 US gal). Range was 2,000 km (1,240 mi). The oil tank was below the engine and contained 150 L (40 US gal).

Maximum payload was 2,000 kg (4,410 lb), but if necessary could be raised to 2,500-2,800 kg (5,510-6,170 lb).

The cockpit instruments were repeated for each pilot. The instrument panel included a 'Pezzoni' compass, a 'Sonia' aerometer, a variometer, 'OMI' altimeters and fire detectors with extinguisher controls. The canopy was detachable to allow for exit in an emergency. There was also a rice-transmitter radio, for the wireless-operator/gunner. This consisted of a RE 350 and AR 5 transmitter-receiver. This allowed both telegraphic and voice transmissions. To make this possible, there were two radio antennas: one fixed, one flexible. There were two accumulators and two air-generators. Finally, there was a photographic, photoplanimetric O.M.I. 13x18 camera, or an OMI APR 3 panoramic. Sometimes, a cine-machine-gun was also fitted.

Defensive armament varied between three and six 7.7 mm (.303 in) machine guns. Initially, the armament was quite weak, one 7.7 mm (.303 in) Lewis Gun in the dorsal position, and one in each beam position. This was a serious failing as the gunner could only man one weapon at a time. One improvement was the replacement of the single dorsal gun by a turret fitted with two 7.7 mm (.303 in) Bredas. Another machine gun was sometimes fitted in the ventral position, both for offensive and defensive tasks. Some examples also had a machine gun fixed in the nose, firing with a synchronizer through the propeller disk.

Bombload, theoretically was up to 600 kg (1,320 lb), in practice, it was more. This load was held vertically inside the fuselage, and consisted of two launchers for:

- 6 × 100 kg/220 lb (total practical, 780 kg/1,720 lb)
- 6 × 50 kg/110 lb (total practical, 420 kg/930 lb)
- 6 × 24, 20, 15, 12, 10 kg (50, 40, 33, 26, 20 lb).

Up to 15 × 12 kg (26 lb), 15 kg (33 lb) or 24 kg (50 lb) bombs could be carried in a third launcher. It was also possible to carry two bombs of 250 kg (550 lb) or 500 kg (1,100 lb) or incendiaries (144 × 1 kg/2 lb and 144 × 2 kg/4 lb). Finally, chemical bombs could also be dropped.

The door for entry into the aircraft was on the left-hand side.

A civil version was built with seven seats. The Caproni Ca.140 was, instead, a retractable version of the basic project, but remained prototype. Another prototype was a version with a 3,000 km (1,860 mi) range, but the redesigned Ca.112 was not put into production. Its most notable difference was a new elliptic and enlarged wing.

One example had a 746 kW (1,000 hp) A.80 engine.

Caproni Ca.111Idro floatplane

Possibly the most important version was the seaplane, fitted with two floats under the belly. It had been tested in 1932 and was called the Ca.111 Idro. The Idro version was the first to enter service. It was almost identical to the land version, but weighed 3,500 kg (7,720 lb) and had a 2,000 kg (4,410 lb) payload. The two floats were made of cedarwood. The engine remained the same but with 1,940 L (510 US gal) of fuel. Range was greater, but speed was reduced. Defensive weapons were four 7.7 mm (.303 in) Lewis guns with 2,000 cartridges each. Bombload was similar to that shown above. An 800 kg (1,760 lb) torpedo could also be carried.

== Operational history ==
=== Italy ===
The first examples were used by 146 and 183 Squadriglia, 85° Gruppo, to perform maritime reconnaissance, followed by the 142. They had six machines each. After just a year, these machines were replaced by CANT Z.501s. The aircraft were not scrapped but converted for land use, complete with undercarriage. Over 100 machines were rebuilt between 1934 and 1936. 25 were Idro versions.

The Ca.111 was used as a long-range work-horse by the Regia Aeronautica. Its main employment was in the Second Italo-Abyssinian War. This aircraft was, like all other machines, sent to the Ethiopian theatre by sea. The aircraft performed a variety of tasks, such as long-range reconnaissance, ground attack, bombing, and as a refuelling machine. It was even used to drop live animals to the troops. The aircraft was well suited to this kind of environment. It was relatively simple to maintain and could often be repaired with local materials. In this theatre, it was second only to the SM.81, which was much more sophisticated.

On the whole, this machine was cheap, robust and reliable. It had good performance and could be armed with a variety of ordnance. It was also highly vulnerable and so was not deployed to places like Spain.

Nevertheless, the machine served until the early 1940s, when it was replaced as a reconnaissance aircraft by the Cant Z.501 and the IMAM Ro.37. It was then used in the photoplannimetric role and as a supplier of isolated troops, this time in the Balkans, after the conquest of Yugoslavia.

=== Peru ===
In 1934, as a result of continued tensions with Columbia following the 1932–1933 Colombia–Peru War, the Peruvian government sought to expand its armed forces, and in March 1934 signed a contract with Caproni for twelve Ca.111 bombers and twelve Caproni Ca.114 fighters. Both types were to be operable on wheels or floats, and delivery was required by 23 June that year. To meet these timescales, at least some of the order was met by Regia Aeronautica aircraft, and still carried some Italian markings, including the Fasces symbol, when delivered. Initially, the Peruvians found significant problems with its Ca.111s, (which were nicknamed "Panchos" after an elephant at a zoo in Lima) particularly associated with the engines, with power being limited to 80% to prevent engine damage. In 1936, Peru ordered six Caproni Ca.135 bombers which entered Peruvian Air Force service in 1937, and the opportunity was taken to replace the engines of the Ca.111s by Isotta Fraschini Asso XI R.C.40 as used by the Ca.135. These were more powerful and lighter than the original engines, and improved the aircraft's performance and reliability. In January 1941, a reorganisation of the Peruvian Air Force saw the Ca.111 replaced by Caproni Ca.310s in front line bomber squadrons, with the remaining Ca.111s transferring to second line duties, including training, aerial photography and transport duties. The outbreak of the Ecuadorian–Peruvian War saw Peru's Ca.111s being used to support the Peruvian offensive, transporting troops and supplies to the frontline and evacuating casualties. On 31 July, shortly before a ceasefire was due to come into place, Peruvian commanders decided to seize the cities of Santa Rosa and Machala and the port of Puerto Bolívar, which had been evacuated by Ecuadorian troops. Ca.111s landed troops at Santa Rosa and Macala airfields, and one Ca.111 dropped a small number of paratroopers at Puerto Bolívar. This was the first combat use of paratroopers in South American history. Following the end of the Ecuadorian–Peruvian War, spares shortages caused availability of the Ca.111s to decline considerably, and one aircraft was re-engined with a Wright R-1820 Cyclone in an attempt to improve reliability. While the modification proved successful, plans to reengine the remainder of Peru's Ca.111s (and its Ca.135s) were cancelled as the United States was unwilling to supply the required engines. The last Peruvian Ca.111 continued to fly until 1944.

=== China ===
Two Caproni Ca.111RCs were demonstrated to China in 1934, with one, fitted out as a transport, donated to Chiang Kai-shek. Six Ca.111RCs were purchased by the Chinese Nationalist government in 1934, and these were delivered in early 1935. The Ca.111s were operated, along with six Savoia-Marchetti S.72 bomber-transports, by the 8th Bombardment Group based at Nanchang, although both types were mainly used as troop transports. Some Ca.111s were reported by American sources as still being in service in July 1937, on the outbreak of the Second Sino-Japanese War.

== Operators ==
China

- Chinese Nationalist Air Force

Italy

- Regia Aeronautica

Peru

- Peruvian Aviation Corps

== Specifications (Ca.111) ==
Data from Dimensione Cielo, Aerei Italiani nella 2ª Guerra Mondiale: 7: Trasporto

General characteristics

- Crew: 3
- Length: 15.30 m (50 ft 2 in)
- Wingspan: 19.70 m (64 ft 8 in)
- Height: 3.75 m (12 ft 4 in)
- Wing area: 61.48 m^{2} (661.8 sq ft)
- Empty weight: 3,418 kg (7,535 lb)
- Gross weight: 5,418 kg (11,945 lb)
- Powerplant: 1 × Isotta Fraschini Asso 750 RC.35 water-cooled W18 engine, 630 kW (850 hp) (at 3,500 m (11,500 ft))

Performance

- Maximum speed: 280 km/h (170 mph, 150 kn) at 4,000 m (13,000 ft)
- Stall speed: 100 km/h (62 mph, 54 kn) (minimum speed)
- Range: 2,000 km (1,200 mi, 1,100 nmi)
- Service ceiling: 6,700 m (21,980 ft)
- Time to altitude: 17 min 5 sec to 4,000 m (13,000 ft)

Armament

- 4 × 7.7 mm (.303 in) Breda-SAFAT machine gun in flexible positions in dorsal, ventral, and beam positions
- Up to 600 kg (1,323 lb) of bombs

== See also ==
Related lists

- List of Interwar military aircraft
