= Alfa Romeo D2 =

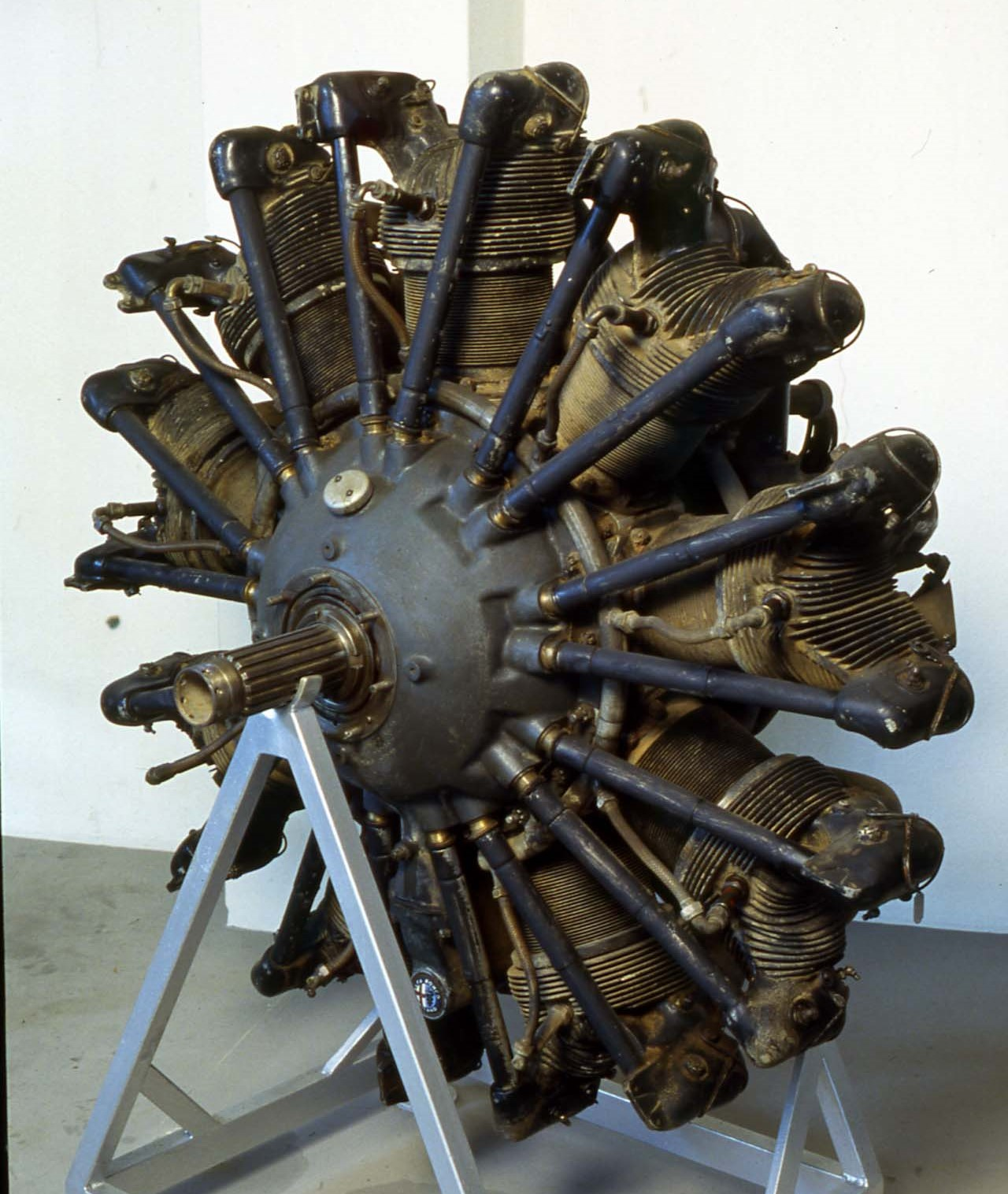
- Type: nine-cylinder radial engine
- Manufacturer: Alfa Romeo
- First run: 1930s
- Number built: ~600

The Alfa Romeo D2 was a nine-cylinder radial engine for aircraft use produced in Italy. It was typically rated between 240 and 270 hp. The engine was designed by Vittorio Jano, 600 units were produced between 1931 and 1934. This engine was also the first purpose-built aircraft engine produced by Alfa Romeo, previous Alfa engines used in aircraft were derived from engines used in cars. A supercharged derivative was produced as the D2 C.30.

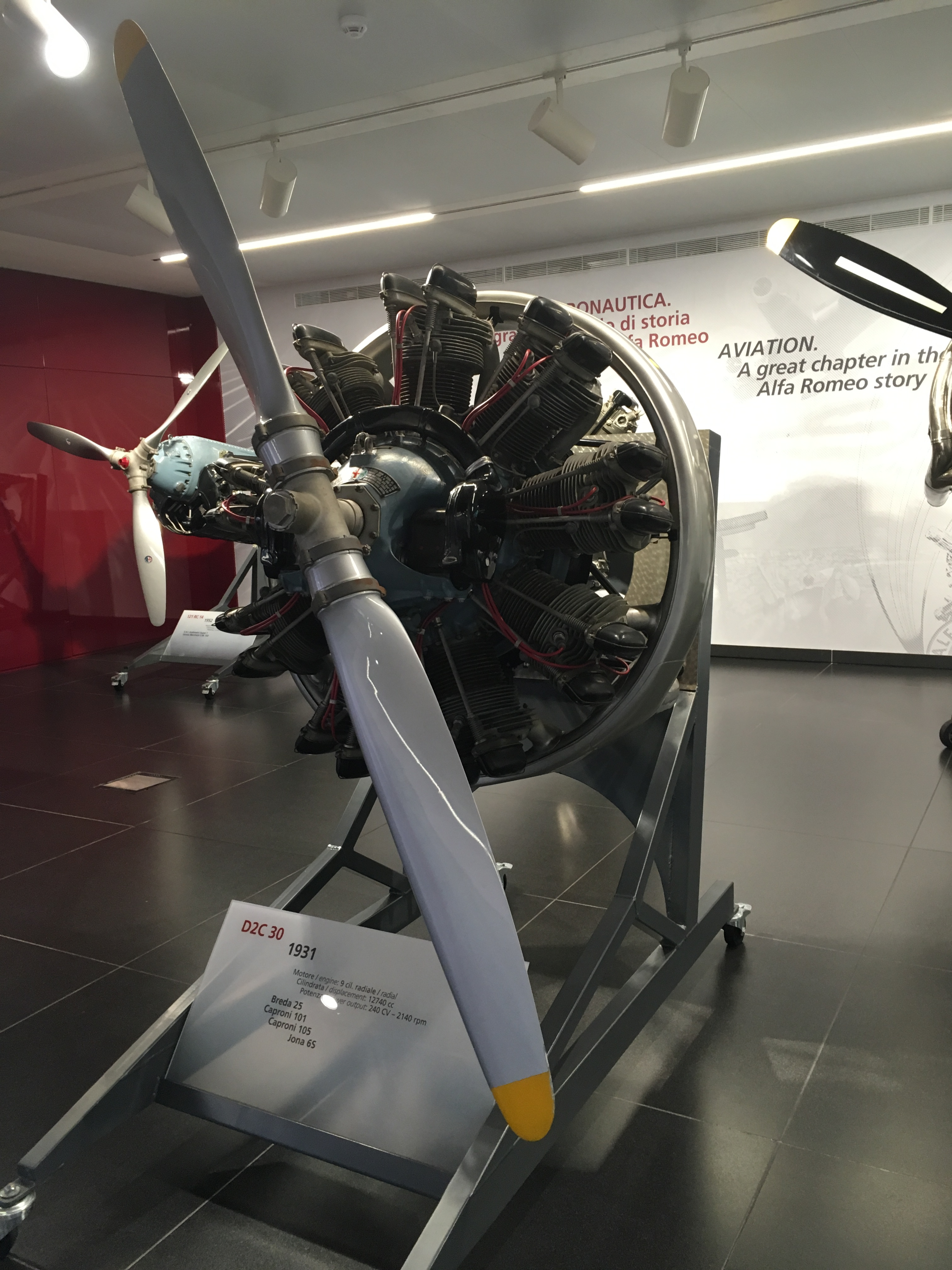
D2C supercharged derivative

== Applications ==
- Breda Ba.25
- Caproni Ca.101
- Caproni Ca.105
- Jona J-6S

== Specifications (D2 C.30) ==
Data from Jane's.

=== General characteristics ===
- Type: Nine-cylinder radial engine
- Bore: 120 mm (4.72 in)
- Stroke: 135 mm (5.31 in)
- Displacement: 13.74 L (838.47 cu in)
- Dry weight: 275 kg (606 lb)

=== Components ===
- Valvetrain: dual cam ring driving 2 overhead valves per cylinder via push-rods and rockers
- Supercharger: 2.5:1
- Fuel system: Memini carburettor with automatic servo-boost control
- Oil system: dual gear pumps
- 2x Marelli MF.9 magnetos

=== Performance ===
- Power output: normal 205 kW (275 hp) at 2,000 rpm at 2,500 m (8,200 ft); maximum 230 kW (310 hp) at 2,200 rpm at 2,250 m (7,380 ft)
- Compression ratio: 5:1

== See also ==
Related lists

- List of aircraft engines
