= Macchi M.C.94 =

1930s Italian commercial flying boat

M.C.94
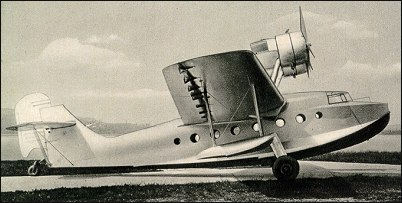
- The prototype M.C.94 Anfibio

General information
- Type: Commercial flying boat
- Manufacturer: Macchi
- Designer: Mario Castoldi
- Status: Retired
- Primary users: Ala Littoria (Italy) Corporación Sudamericana de Servicios Aéreos (Argentina)
- Number built: 12

History
- Introduction date: 1936
- First flight: 1935

The Macchi M.C.94 was a 1930s Italian commercial flying boat built by Macchi.

== Development ==
The M.C.94 was designed by Mario Castoldi as a commercial passenger transport flying boat to replace the Ala Littoria airline's elderly CANT 10s. Constructed mainly of wood, it was a high-wing cantilever monoplane with a two-step hull and single fin and rudder. The prototype, which was an amphibian with a retractable wheeled undercarriage which swung forward into streamlined casings in the leading edges of the wings, was powered by two 574 kilowatts (770 hp) Wright SGR-1820-F Cyclone nine-cylinder air-cooled radial engines mounted above the wing, each driving a tractor propeller. It was followed by 11 production aircraft, which were all pure flying boats. From the seventh aircraft, 570 kilowatts (760 hp) Alfa Romeo 126 R.C.10 radial engines were fitted. The three-man crew was accommodated in a raised and enclosed cockpit and the main cabin could accommodate 12 passengers.

Ala Littoria purchased the prototype and first five production aircraft in 1936. The Regia Aeronautica (Italian Royal Air Force) declined purchase of the final six production aircraft, which Ala Littoria then also bought.

== Operational history ==
The M.C.94 entered service with Ala Littoria in 1936 on Adriatic routes, and a number were still in service during World War II. In 1939, Ala Italia sold three of its M.C.94s to its Argentinian partner, Corporación Sudamericana de Servicios Aéreos.

The prototype set a number of international world records for flying boats in 1937, including a new altitude record of 6,432 metres (21,102 ft) carrying a payload of 1,000 kilograms (2,200 lb), a speed record of 248.967 kilometres per hour (154.701 mph) over a 2,000 kilometres (1,200 mi) closed circuit, and a speed record of 257.138 kilometres per hour (159.778 mph) carrying a 1,000 kilograms (2,200 lb) payload over a 1,000 kilometres (620 mi) closed circuit.

== Variants ==
M.C.94 Anfibio
Prototype amphibian version with Wright engines.
M.C.94 I
The first five production aircraft built as pure flying boats with Wright engines.
M.C.94 II
The final six production aircraft, also built as flying boats with Alfa Romeo 126 R.C.10 engines. In 1939, three were exported to Argentina.

== Operators ==
ARG
Corporación Sudamericana de Servicios Aéreos
A.L.F.A. (Aviación del Litoral Fluvial Argentino)
Kingdom of Italy
Ala Littoria
Regia Aeronautica

== Specifications (MC.94) ==
Data from Italian Civil & Military Aircraft 1930-1945 World Encyclopedia of Civil Aircraft

General characteristics

- Crew: 3
- Capacity: 12
- Length: 16.167 m (53 ft 0.5 in) (Anfibio 15.5 m (51 ft))
- Wingspan: 22.924 m (75 ft 2.5 in) (Anfibio 22.8 m (75 ft))
- Height: 5.448 m (17 ft 10.5 in)
- Wing area: 75.79 m^{2} (815.8 sq ft)
- Empty weight: 5,339 kg (11,770 lb) (Anfibio 5,987.5 kg (13,200 lb))
- Gross weight: 7,534 kg (16,610 lb) (Anfibio 8,233 kg (18,151 lb))
- Powerplant: 2 × Alfa Romeo 126 R.C.10 9-cyl. air-cooled radial piston engine, 580 kW (780 hp) each - Take-off rating 596.6 kW (800 hp)

Performance

- Maximum speed: 291 km/h (181 mph, 157 kn) at 1,000 m (3,281 ft) (Anfibio 282 km/h (175 mph))
- Cruise speed: 245 km/h (152 mph, 132 kn) (Anfibio 240 km/h (149 mph))
- Range: 1,387 km (862 mi, 749 nmi) (Anfibio 901 km (560 mi))
- Endurance: 5 hours 30 minutes
- Service ceiling: 6,000 m (19,680 ft) (Anfibio 5,798 m (19,022 ft))
- Rate of climb: 4.18 m/s (823 ft/min) (Anfibio 3.55m/s (698ft/min))
- Time to altitude: 7min 58 sec to 2,000 m (6,562 ft) and 19min 30sec to 4,000 m (13,123 ft)

== See also ==
Related lists

- List of seaplanes and flying boats
