= SAI Ambrosini =

Italian aircraft manufacturer established in Passignano sul Trasimeno (1922-1992)

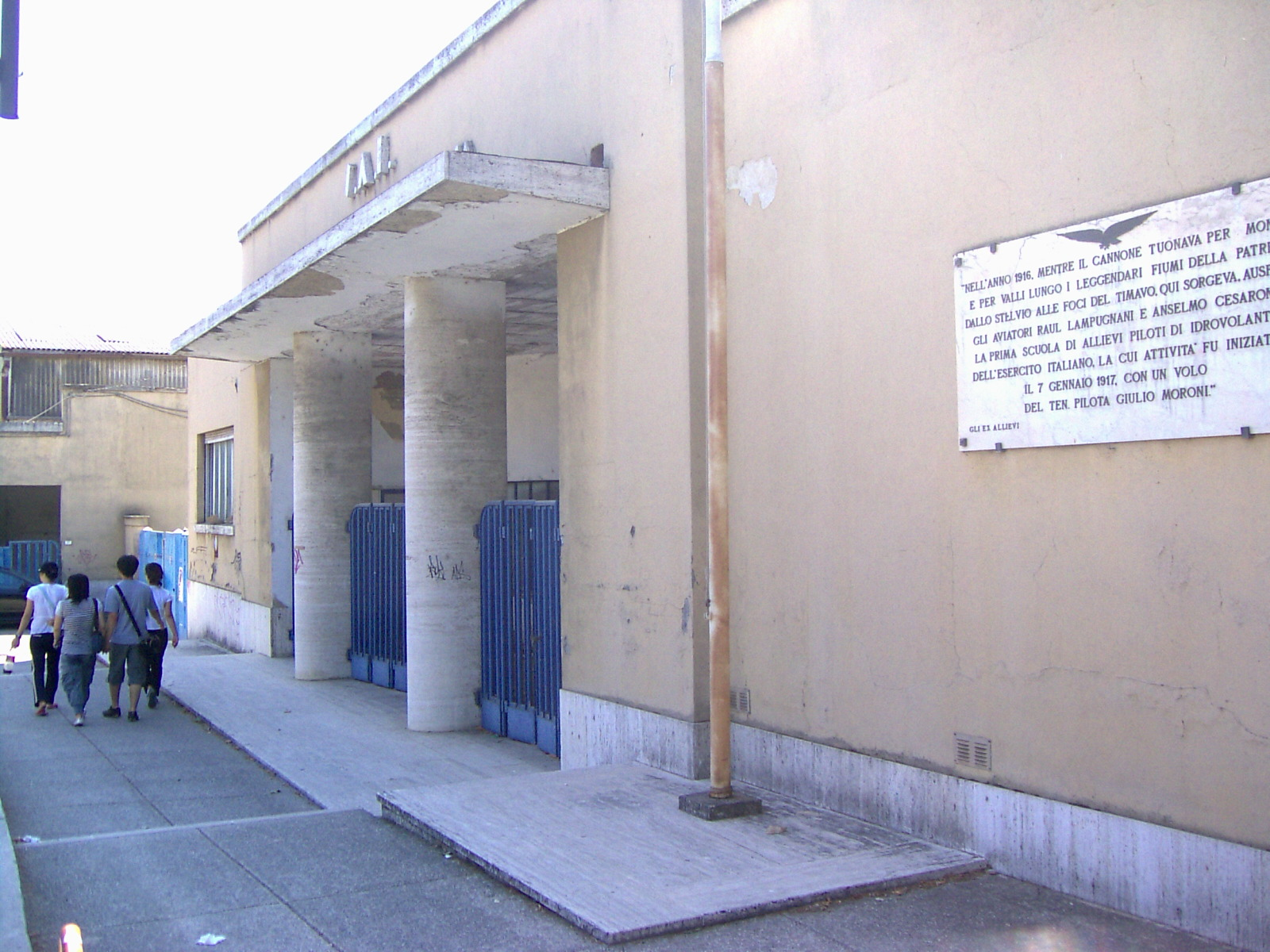
- The former SAI Ambrosini factory in Passignano
- Company type: Private
- Founded: 1922
- Defunct: 1992
- Headquarters: Passignano sul Trasimeno, Italy
- Area served: Worldwide

SAI Ambrosini was an Italian aircraft manufacturer. The company was established in Passignano sul Trasimeno, Italy, in 1922 as the Società Aeronautica Italiana. It became SAI Ambrosini when it was acquired by the Ambrosini group in 1934. Prior to World War II, the firm built a number of light touring and racing aircraft, the most successful of which was the SAI.7. During the war, this design served as the basis for some light fighter designs, but these did not enter mass production.

Ambrosini was reformed in 1946 and continued with the development and manufacture of the SAI.7 design, eventually producing jet fighter prototypes based on it, but these were not successful. During the 1980s, the firm ventured into boatbuilding (including Azzurra, Italy's first America's Cup contender) and eventually into oil rigs before closing in 1992.

== Aircraft ==
Aircraft built by Ambrosini
Model name	First flight	Number built	Notes
Ambrosini SAI.1	1935	1	biplane built for 1935 Avioraduno del Littorio air rally
Ambrosini SAI.2	1934	1	monoplane built for 1935 Avioraduno del Littorio air rally
Ambrosini SAI.2S	1937		four seat general aviation light aircraft
Ambrosini SAI.3	1937	10	General aviation
Ambrosini SS.4	1939	1	canard layout fighter
Ambrosini SAI.7 & S.7	July 1939	159	2 pre-war racing aircraft, 10 SAI.7T wartime military trainer and 145 post war
Ambrosini SAI.10 Grifone	8 July 1939	10	Trainer
Ambrosini SAI.10 Gabbiano			Floatplane
Ambrosini SAI.11			Trainer
Ambrosini SAI.207	1940	14	lightweight interceptor developed from SAI.7
Ambrosini SAI.403 Dardo	1943	1	Fighter
Ambrosini S.1001 Grifo	1947		General aviation
Ambrosini S.1002 Trasimeno			General aviation
Ambrosini Sagittario	1953	1	Experimental swept wing jet design
Ambrosini Rondone	1951	20	General aviation

== See also ==
- List of Italian aircraft companies
