= Sergio Stefanutti =

Italian aerospace engineer (1906–1992)

Sergio Stefanutti (1906–1992) was an Italian engineer who specialized in the design of aircraft.

== Biography ==
He joined aircraft manufacturer Società Aeronautica Italiana (later renamed SAI Ambrosini following a takeover) in the 1920s. He was the designer of the first Italian canard fighter, the Ambrosini S.S.4, and then a touring monoplane, the Ambrosini S.7. He developed the S.7 into the Ambrosini SAI.207 and Ambrosini SAI.403; these aircraft were lightweight fighters made entirely of wood.

Stefanutti is also the first planner of a war aircraft of series operating by remote control, built by Aerolombarda and ready for operations during the period of armistice. In the postwar Stefanutti was applied to the reaction flight, coming to plan and then to realize the first hunting jet plane of national planning, that takings the name of Aerfer Sagittario 2. This aircraft is visible in the Italian Air Force Museum near Bracciano (Rome); together with the following development that it also foresaw the use of a rocket besides the turbojet to increase the push and the speed of interception. This aircraft, in the second variation, is the first Italian aircraft to break the sound barrier; subsequently it was not adopted by Italian Air Force.

== Bibliography ==
- Ciampaglia, Giuseppe: "Dal SAI Ambrosini Sagittario all'Aerfer Leone. Storia dei primi caccia supersonici italiani realizzati da Sergio Stefanutti". IBN editore Roma 2004 ISBN 88-7565-000-4.
