= Ugo Gobbato =

Italian businessman

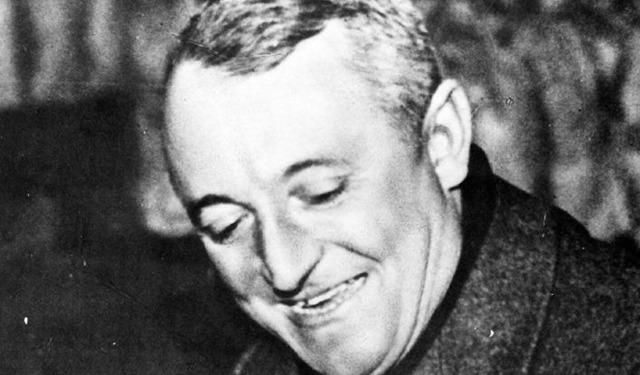
Ugo Gobbato

Ugo Gobbato (Volpago del Montello, 16 July 1888 – Milan, 28 April 1945) was an Italian engineer and Managing Director of Alfa Romeo 1933 to 1945.

Gobbato studied in Germany where he graduated in mechanical engineering at the Technical University of Zwickau in Saxony. After having fulfilled his military service between 1915 and 1918 during World War One, he was hired by Fiat in Turin and was appointed the first director of the Lingotto factory. From 1929 to 1931 he oversaw the construction of Fiat factories in Germany and Spain. In 1931, Fiat founder and senator Giovanni Agnelli (1866–1945) entrusted Gobbato with the construction of the first Fiat factory in Moscow. Gobbato moved with his family to Moscow, where he lived for over two years.

In 1933 Gobbato moved back to Italy, when the government and the Istituto per la Ricostruzione Industriale (IRI) gave him the task of reorganizing Alfa Romeo which at the time was on the brink of bankruptcy. From 1938 he directed the development of a new factory in Alfa Romeo Pomigliano d'Arco plant outside Naples, which had been bombed in 1943. Towards the end of World War Two Gobbato was relocated to Milan. Gobbato led the company until the end of the Italian Civil War, when he was assassinated by one of Alfa Romeo's workers, Antonio Mutti, in Milan on 28 April 1945. He was followed as Alfa director by Pasquale Gallo (1887–1982).

In 1916 Gobbato married Dianella Marsiaj. Their son, Pier Ugo Gobbato (1918–2008), was a racing driver. The football stadium in Pomigliano d'Arco is named after him.

== Literature ==
- Marino Parolin, Ugo Gobbato - La leggenda di un innovatore senza epoca, Volpago del Montello, 2009 (see gobbatougo.it, the book's homepage)
