= Caproni Ca.97 =

Ca.97
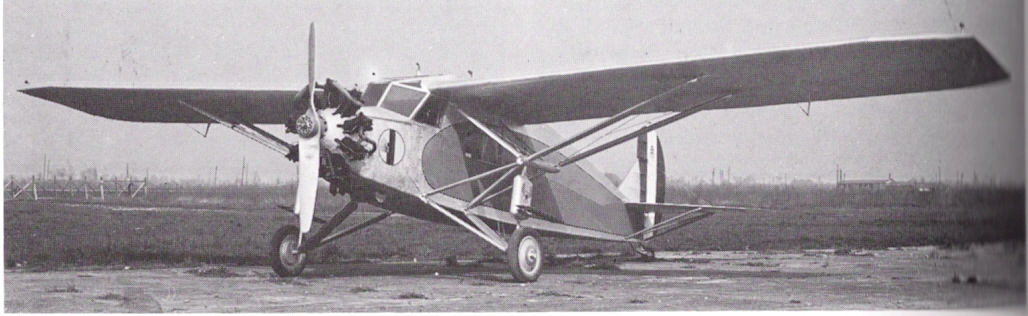
- The single-engine version of the Caproni Ca.97.

General information
- Type: Utility aircraft
- Manufacturer: Caproni
- Number built: 13

History
- First flight: 1927

The Caproni Ca.97 was a utility monoplane aircraft designed and produced by the Italian aircraft manufacturer Caproni. It had a range of powerplant arrangements, the aircraft could be flown with many as three radial engines, however, many were built with only the nose engine present or with only the two nacelle-mounted engines.

The Ca.97 was originally designed during the latter half of the 1920s as a high-wing braced trimotor monoplane of conventional configuration with one engine mounted on the nose and the other two carried on strut-mounted nacelles at the fuselage sides. It was adopted by both civilian and military operators, and thus saw a diverse range of uses from utility transport to limited use as an airliner. The Regia Aeronautica routinely used the Ca.97 to conduct colonial policing in North Africa.

== Design ==
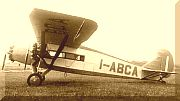
A Ca.97 in a trimotor configuration

The Caproni Ca.97 monoplane utility aircraft of all-metal construction. Provisions were made to make use of a wide range of engine installations, permitting the use of between one and three engines, and thus provide a range of power outputs to suit various purposes. The aircraft had a relatively large fuselage for its size that was designed from the onset to be adaptable and compatible with various installations as to permit the aircraft to be used effectively across a variety of roles.

The structural design principles of the Ca.97 was considerable different from those of prior metal aircraft, not only domestically but also internationally. Caproni extensively studied various metal construction techniques then in use by numerous companies before deciding to pursue two complimentary fabrication principles, these being material homogeneity and initial tensioning. Homogeneity extended beyond the type of material used; certain fabrication techniques, such as thermal treatment and autogenous welding of key members, were avoided entirely due to their tendency to cause annealing and localised weaknesses in the material. Fabrication of principal structural elements under tension offset settling, which had been a common cause of permanent deformation. These two principles were attributed to the lightweight yet sturdy structure of the Ca.97. Tests conducted on both the complete airframe and individual parts demonstrated their possession of a relatively high degree of elasticity, similar to that of wood.

The structure of the Ca.97 was almost entirely composed of carbon steel; specifically, steel tubing was used for the spars and girders alike. A few critically important joints were made from chromium steel. The tubes were joined by a combination of soldering and steel screws, internal lubrication was applied to the tubing as an anti-corrosion measure; both construction and repair work were eased via the use of an identical manner of assembly for every joint. Canvas coverings were used for the wings, fuselage, and tail for its simplicity and economic qualities. The entirely enclosed fuselage was supported by four longerons along with various crosspieces and uprights composed of steel tubing; rigidity was achieved via the use of adjustable brace wires. The junctions between the longerons, struts, cross-pieces and brace wires were made from tubing and sheet steel while the junctions of the wings and landing gear used nickel steel instead. The forward centre section of the fuselage contained eight junctions, composed of high-resistance steel, as attachment points for the wings, undercarriage, and (via struts) the cradles for the lateral engines.

Each of the wings was half overhung and stiffened both fore and aft by struts that transmitted stresses to the centre of the spars. The wing structure was relatively orthodox, comprising two spars and numerous ribs composed of tubular steel and stiffened using brace wires. The central portion of the wing, which attached to the four upper junctions of the fuselage, was horizontal across the width of the fuselage and then formed a slight dihedral. The spars consisted of two tubular stringers joined to tubular uprights and adjustable steel crosspieces. The bottom flange of the lattice type ribs was entirely straight from the front spar to the trailing edge. Several ribs with central compression struts supported the reactions of the wing's interior crosspieces. The leading edge of the wing had a sheet duralumin covering while the trailing edge consisted of a steel wire. The wings were equipped with ailerons, each being controlled by a single central lever.

The Ca.97 could be flown by a single pilot using a control stick, although a wheel was sometimes installed instead. The cockpit was provided with sliding windows and was shielded by a hood that connected to the leading edge of the wing. The cabin was located in the central of the fuselage, which could accommodate up to six passengers in comfortable seats arranged in two rows along the sides. Lengthy slide windows were provided. The floor was comprised corrugated sheet duralumin while the doors were made of wood. One door, at the rear of the cabin, provided access to the baggage hold and toilet while a separate door on the left-hand side was used for boarding and disembarking.

As many as three engines could be install on the Ca.97, one on the nose and the other two within strut-mounted nacelles at the fuselage sides. The mounting for the nose engine, if present, was installed on a tubular pyramid-shaped area on the forward-most portion of the fuselage. The mounting of the lateral engines was secured via two struts that united at the top in a single attachment to the forward wing spar along with triangular supports that attached to the apexes of the supports of the wing struts. The fuel tanks were located within the wings; fuel was gravity-fed to the engines. If additional fuel capacity was required, the installation of a single central tank had already been provisioned for. The tail unit of the aircraft had a structure composed entirely of steel tubing. A variable incidence stabilizer was present, which could be adjusted by the pilot mid-flight and was rigidly attached to the vertical fin and the lower fuselage longerons via multiple steel wires. A balanced rudder was also present.

Below the tail unit, the terminal upright of the fuselage was the mounting point for the skid, which was furnished with rubber shock absorbers. The aircraft was furnished with a relatively wide track undercarriage, the struts of which formed an integral part of the framework of the cell. Large balloon-tyred wheels were fitted upon an axis; these could be easily removed and exchanged as required. The undercarriage arrangement made it extremely unlikely for the aircraft to overturn even when encountering rough terrain. A shock absorber was hinged to the top of the undercarriage to handle any vertical oscillations generated.

== Operational history ==
Some aircraft were used by airlines in small numbers. Military versions were used by the Regia Aeronautica in colonial policing roles, particularly in Libya, from November 1929.

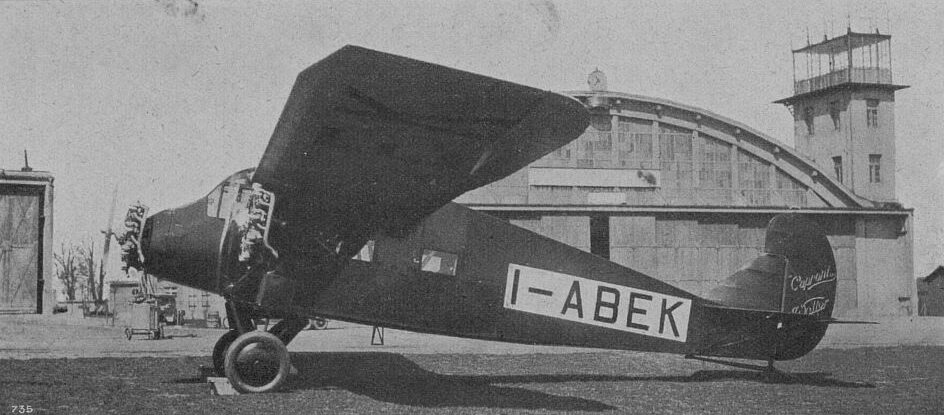
Caproni Ca.97 with Walter Mars engines, 1931

== Variants ==
Ca.97
Three-engined prototype, powered by three 75 kW (100 hp) Lorraine-Dietrich 5P five-cylinder radial engines; one built.
Ca.97 C.Tr.
(C.Tr. - coloniale trasporto - colonial transport), colonial transports similar to the Ca.97, powered by three 108 kW (145 hp) Walter Mars radial engines; two built.
Ca.97 C.Mo
Powered by a single 370 kW (500 hp) Alfa Romeo Jupiter VIII Ri.
Ca.97 M
Powered by a single 310 kW (420 hp) Alfa Romeo Jupiter IV.
Ca.97 Co
Colonial reconnaissance-bomber, powered by a single 310 kW (420 hp) Alfa Romeo Jupiter IV; five aircraft built.
Ca.97 Ri
Armed reconnaissance aircraft, powered by a single 370 kW (500 hp) Alfa Romeo Jupiter VIII Ri; four built for the Regia Aeronautica.
Ca.97 Idro
Twin-float seaplane version, powered by a single 370 kW (500 hp) Alfa Romeo Jupiter VIII Ri; one aircraft built.

== Operators ==
=== Civil ===
Italy

- Salvatore Castelli
- Società Aerea Mediterranea
- Ala Littoria

Hungary

- Malért (Magyar Légiforgalmi R.T.)

=== Military ===
Italy

- Regia Aeronautica

Hungary

- Magyar Légierő (Hungarian Air Force)

== Specifications (Ca.97 Ri) ==
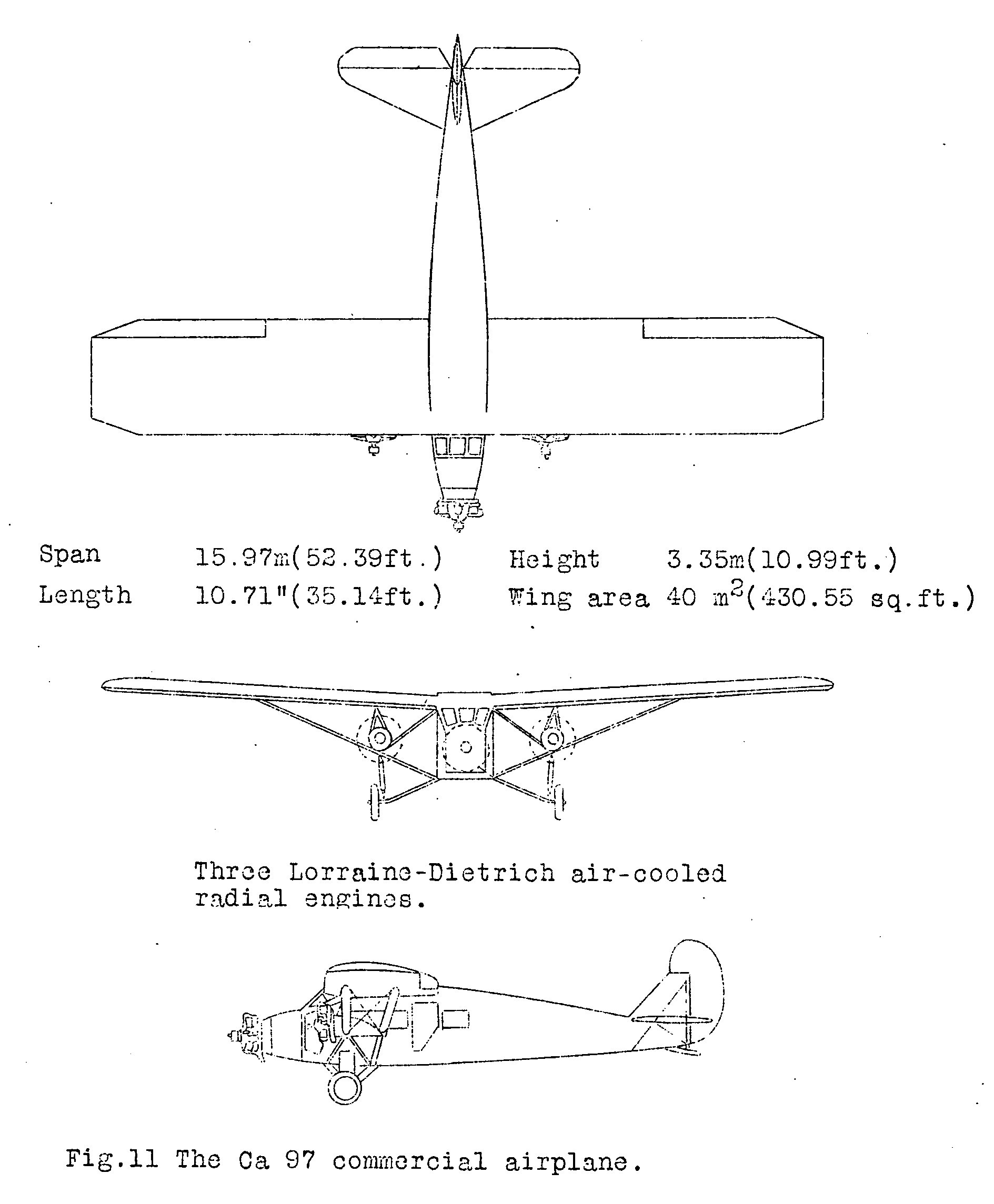
Caproni Ca.97 3-view drawing from NACA Aircraft Circular No.84

Data from Aeroplani Caproni, Jane's all the World's Aircraft 1928

General characteristics

- Crew: 1
- Capacity: 4-5 crew
- Length: 11.35 m (37 ft 3 in)
- Wingspan: 16 m (52 ft 6 in)
- Height: 3.5 m (11 ft 6 in)
- Wing area: 40 m^{2} (430 sq ft)
- Empty weight: 1,650 kg (3,638 lb)
- Gross weight: 2,650 kg (5,842 lb)
- Powerplant: 1 × Alfa Romeo Jupiter VIII Ri nine-cylinder air-cooled radial piston engine, 370 kW (500 hp)
- Propellers: 2-bladed fixed pitch propeller

Performance

- Maximum speed: 230 km/h (140 mph, 120 kn)
- Range: 1,000 km (620 mi, 540 nmi)
- Service ceiling: 5,750 m (18,860 ft)

Armament

- Guns: 2x 7.7 mm (0.30 in) machine guns in dorsal and ventral positions
