= List of Regia Aeronautica aircraft used in World War II =

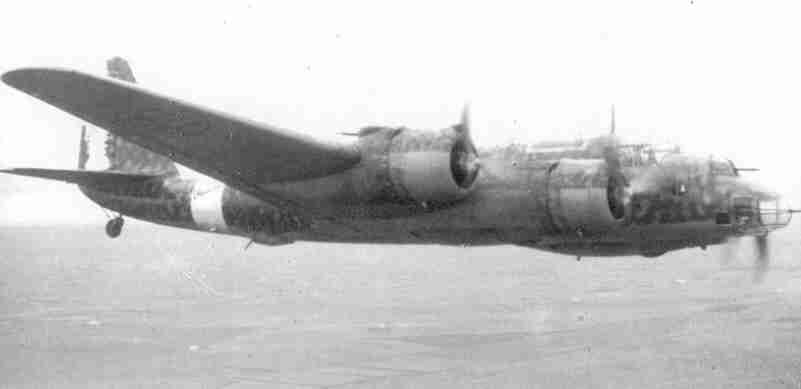
Italian Piaggio P.108 bomber in 1942

A list of aircraft used by Italy during World War II until its capitulation to the Allies in September 1943. After that Italy was divided in two states, the Axis Italian Social Republic in the north and the Allied Kingdom of Italy in the south. Both countries had their own Air Force fitted with formerly used Italian aircraft and other nations' planes. Meanwhile, the Italian National Republican Air Force continued fighting against the Allies till the last months of 1945, and the Italian Co-Belligerent Air Force begun operation against the Nazi forces in the Balkans. Aircraft marked in pink were captured, while aircraft in blue did not progress past prototypes.

== Aircraft ==
Aircraft Model	Name	Role	1st flight	Service entry	# Used	Refs
Aeronautica Lombarda AL-12P	-	glider	1943	1943	16	
Aeronautica Umbra Trojani AUT.18	-	fighter	1939	n/a	1	
Ambrosini A.R.	-	flying bomb	1943	n/a	5	
Ambrosini CVV-6 Canguro	-	glider	1941	1943	36	
Ambrosini S.7T	-	trainer	1939	1943	10	
Ambrosini SAI.10	Grifone (griffon)	trainer	1939	1940	10	
Ambrosini SAI.207	-	fighter	1941	1942	14	
Ambrosini SAI.403	Dardo (dart)	fighter	1943	n/a	1	
Ambrosini SS.4	-	fighter	1939	n/a	1	
Arado Ar 96B-2	-	trainer	1938	1943	2	
AVIA FL.3	-	trainer	1939	1940	335	
Breda Ba.25	-	trainer	1931	1932	763	
Breda Ba.28	-	trainer	1936	1938	59	
Breda Ba.39	-	liaison	1932	n/a	60	
Breda Ba.44	-	transport	1934	1936	5	
Breda Ba.64	-	ground attack	1935	1937	42	
Breda Ba.65	-	ground attack	1935	1937	200	
Breda Ba.75	-	reconnaissance / ground attack	1939	n/a	1	
Breda Ba.82	-	medium bomber	1937	n/a	1	
Breda Ba.88	Lince (lynx)	fighter / bomber	1936	1938	149	
Breda Ba.201	-	dive bomber	1941	n/a	2	
Bücker Bü 131	Jungmann (young man)	trainer	1934	1941	41	(Note: Captured from Yugoslavia)
CANSA C.5	-	trainer	1939	1939	62	
CANSA C.6	-	trainer	1941	n/a	2	
CANSA FC.12	-	trainer	1940	n/a	10+1	
CANSA FC.20	-	reconnaissance / bomber	1941	1943	8	
CANT Z.501	Gabbiano (gull)	maritime patrol	1934	1936	454	
CANT Z.506B	Airone (heron)	maritime patrol / bomber	1935	1939	314	
CANT Z.506C	Airone (heron)	transport / rescue	1935	1939	57	
CANT Z.511	-	transport seaplane	1940	n/a	2	
CANT Z.515	-	reconnaissance / bomber	1939	n/a	11	
CANT Z.1007	Alcione (kingfisher)	bomber	1937	1939	582	
CANT Z.1011	-	heavy bomber / transport	1936	1938	6	
CANT Z.1012	-	liaison	1937	1938	5	
CANT Z.1018	Leone (lion)	bomber	1939	1943	15	
Caproni Ca.100	-	trainer	1928	1930	650	
Caproni Ca.111	-	reconnaissance	1932	1933	152	
Caproni Ca.133	-	transport / bomber	1934	1935	443	
Caproni Ca.135	-	bomber	1935	1937	69	
Caproni Ca.148	-	transport		1938	54	
Caproni Ca.164	-	liaison	1938		280	
Caproni Ca.165	-	fighter	1938	n/a	1	
Caproni Ca.308/A.P.1	Boreas (north wind)	light bomber	1934	1936	53	
Caproni Ca.309	Ghibli (south wind)	reconnaissance	1937	n/a	243	
Caproni Ca.310	Libeccio (s.w. wind)	reconnaissance / bomber	1937	1938	193	
Caproni Ca.311	-	bomber	1939	1939	284	
Caproni Ca.312	-	bomber	1939	n/a	39	
Caproni Ca.313	-	bomber	1939	n/a	338	
Caproni Ca.314	-	bomber / maritime patrol	n/a	1942	200	
Caproni Ca.316	-	reconnaissance / patrol	1940	n/a	14	
Caproni Ca.331	Raffica (gust)	bomber / night fighter	1940	n/a	3	
Caproni Campini N.1	-	engine testbed	1940	n/a	2	
Caproni Vizzola F.4	-	fighter	1940	n/a	1	
Caproni Vizzola F.5	-	fighter	1939	1939	13	
Caproni Vizzola F.6	-	fighter	1941	n/a	2	
Caudron C.440	Goéland (seagull)	transport	1934	1943	7	(Note: Captured from France)
Caudron C.635	Simoun (south east wind)	liaison	1934	1943	2	
CNA PM.1	-	trainer	1939	n/a	1	
Dewoitine D.520 C.1	-	fighter	1938	1940	60	(Note: received in exchange for LeO 451 given to Germany)
Dornier Do 217J	-	night fighter	1938	1942	11	
Douglas DC-2	-	transport	1934	1940	2	
Douglas DC-3	-	transport	n/a	n/a	1	
Fiat B.R.20	Cicogna (stork)	bomber	1936	1936	233	
Fiat B.R.20M	Cicogna (stork)	bomber	1936	1936	279	
Fiat C.R.25	-	reconnaissance / transport	1937	1939	12	
Fiat C.R.32	-	fighter	1933	1933	1052	
Fiat C.R.42	Falco (falcon)	fighter	1938	1939	1551	
Fiat G.8	-	trainer	1934	n/a	51	
Fiat G.12	-	transport	1940	1941	28	
Fiat G.18	-	transport	1935	1943	9	
Fiat G.50	Freccia (arrow)	fighter	1937	1938	683	
Fiat G.55	Centauro (centaur)	fighter	1942	1943	30	
Fiat RS.14	-	reconnaissance	1939	1941	186	
Fieseler Fi 156	Storch (stork)	liaison	1936	n/a	24	
Gotha Go 242	-	transport glider	1941	1943	4	
IMAM Ro.10; Fokker F.VII	-	transport	1924	n/a	1; 2	
IMAM Ro.37	Lince (lynx)	reconnaissance	1933	1935	617	
IMAM Ro.41	-	fighter / trainer / liaison	1934	1935	743	
IMAM Ro.43	-	reconnaissance	1934	1935	193	
IMAM Ro.44	-	floatplane fighter	1936	1937	35	
IMAM Ro.51	-	fighter	1937	n/a	1	
IMAM Ro.57bis	-	dive bomber	1939	1943	50	
IMAM Ro.58	-	dive bomber	1942	n/a	1	
IMAM Ro.63	-	reconnaissance / liaison	1940	n/a	6	
Junkers Ju 52/3m g7e	-	transport	1930	1943	4	
Junkers Ju 87B-2 & D-1	Stuka (dive bomber)	dive bomber	1935	1940	210	
Junkers Ju 88A-4	-	bomber	1936	1943	46	
Klemm Kl 35	-	liaison / trainer	1935	1943	1	
Liore et Olivier LeO 451 B.4	-	bomber	1937	1941	27	
Macchi M.C.94	-	transport	1936	n/a	6	
Macchi M.C.100	-	transport	1936	n/a	6	
Macchi C.200	Saetta (lightning)	fighter	1937	1939	1151	
Macchi C.201	-	fighter	1940	n/a	1	
Macchi C.202	Folgore (thunderbolt)	fighter	1940	1941	1172	
Macchi C.205N	Orione (orion)	fighter	1942	n/a	2	
Macchi C.205V	Veltro (greyhound)	fighter	1942	1943	199	
Messerschmitt Bf 108B-2	Taifun (typhoon)	liaison	1934	1941	1	
Messerschmitt Bf 109G/K	-	fighter	1935	1943	225	
Messerschmitt Bf 110C-4/G-4	-	night fighter	1936	1942	3	
Morane-Saulnier MS.230 Et.2	-	trainer	1929	1943	8	
Morane-Saulnier MS.406 C.1	-	fighter	1935	1943	25	
Nardi FN.305	-	trainer	1935	1935	208	
Nardi FN.315	-	trainer	1938	1943	31	
Nardi FN.316	-	trainer	1941	1943	49	
Piaggio P.32	-	bomber	1936	1937	28	
Piaggio P.50	-	heavy bomber	1937	n/a	3	
Piaggio P.108B	-	bomber	1939	1942	24	
Piaggio P.108T	-	transport	1939	1942	12	
Piaggio P.111	-	high altitude research	1941	n/a	1	
Piaggio P.119	-	fighter	1942	n/a	1	
Potez 63-11	-	reconnaissance	1938	1943	77	
Potez 630/631 C.3	-	heavy fighter	1936	1943	13	
Reggiane Re.2000	Falco I (falcon)	fighter	1939	1940	26	
Reggiane Re.2001	Falco II (falcon)	fighter	1940	1941	243	
Reggiane Re.2002	Ariete (ram)	fighter	1940	1942	140	
Reggiane Re.2003	-	reconnaissance	1941	n/a	1	
Reggiane Re.2004	-	fighter / bomber	n/a	n/a	1	
Reggiane Re.2005	Sagittario (archer)	fighter	1942	1943	37	
Rogožarski SIM-XIV-H	-	coastal reconnaissance / trainer	1938	1941	8	
SAIMAN 200	-	trainer	1938	1940	140	
SAIMAN 202	-	liaison	1938	1939	390	
Savoia-Marchetti S.55X	-	maritime patrol flying boat	1924	1931	25	
Savoia-Marchetti S.56	-	flying-boat trainer	1924	1927	4	
Savoia-Marchetti S.66	-	search and rescue flying boat	1931	1940	6	
Savoia-Marchetti S.73	-	transport	1934	1935	28	
Savoia-Marchetti S.74	-	transport	1934	1935	3	
Savoia-Marchetti SM.75	Marsupiale (marsupial)	transport	1937	n/a	32	
Savoia-Marchetti SM.79	Sparviero (sparrowhawk)	bomber / transport	1934	1936	1240	
Savoia-Marchetti SM.81	Pipistrello (bat)	bomber	1934	1935	534	
Savoia-Marchetti SM.82	-	transport / bomber	1939	1940	726	
Savoia-Marchetti SM.83	-	transport	1937	1939	20	
Savoia-Marchetti SM.84	-	bomber	1940	1941	329	
Savoia-Marchetti SM.85	-	dive bomber	1936	1939	32	
Savoia-Marchetti SM.86	-	dive bomber	1939	n/a	1	
Savoia-Marchetti SM.87	-	transport floatplanes	1939	1940	4	
Savoia-Marchetti SM.88	-	heavy fighter	1939	n/a	1	
Savoia-Marchetti SM.89	-	bomber	1941	1942	1	
Savoia-Marchetti SM.91	-	heavy fighter / bomber	1943	n/a	2	
Savoia-Marchetti SM.92	-	heavy fighter / bomber	1943	n/a	1	
Savoia-Marchetti SM.93	-	dive bomber	1944	n/a	1	
Savoia-Marchetti SM.95	-	transport	1943	n/a	5	

== Captured ==
Repainted in Italian markings. Primarily used for evaluation. Other aircraft were captured but were not flyable.

- Breguet 19 B.2 (1)
- Breguet 693 AB.2 (2+)
- Bristol Beaufighter Mk.IF (1) (Note: Captured from British Royal Air Force during desert war.)
- Bristol Blenheim Mk.IV
- Consolidated B-24D Liberator (1) (Note: Captured from United States Army Air Forces following accidental landing at the wrong airfield.)
- Dornier Do 17Kb-1 (1)
- Fairey Albacore (1) (Note: Captured from British Fleet Air Arm.)
- Fairey Swordfish (1 – not flyable)
- Hawker Fury (4)
- Hawker Hurricane Mk.I (1)
- Lockheed P-38 Lightning (1)
- Rogožarski Fizir (3)
- Rogožarski PVT (1)
- Zmaj Fizir FP-2
