= Caproni AP.1 =

Italian attack aircraft

AP.1

General information
- Type: Attack aircraft
- Manufacturer: Caproni
- Designer: Cesare Pallavicino
- Primary user: Regia Aeronautica
- Number built: 54 + 3 prototypes

History
- Introduction date: 1936
- First flight: 27 April 1934
- Variants: Caproni Ca.335

The Caproni Bergamaschi AP.1 was an Italian monoplane attack aircraft designed by Cesare Pallavicino, coming from the Breda firm.

== Design and development ==
Developed from the Ca.301, a single-seat fighter version of a similar design that was not put into production, the AP.1 was a two-seater version, fitted with a more powerful Alfa Romeo radial engine. Designed to serve both as a fighter and an attack aircraft, it was a low-wing monoplane with a fixed landing gear of mixed construction, having trouser-covered legs. Although it was a monoplane at a time when many of the air forces of the world were flying biplanes, the Caproni was still an anachronism with fixed landing gear (at that time, most new aircraft designs featured retractable landing gears).

The AP.1 prototype first flew on 27 April 1934. An initial series of 12 aircraft was delivered within 1936. In the same year, the Regia Aeronautica ordered a second series with improvements including a more powerful Alfa Romeo engine and more aerodynamic landing gear. In service, the large landing gear trousers were often removed for ease of maintenance.

== Operational history ==
The Caproni AP.1 equipped a total of eight squadriglie (Italian air unit equivalent to half an RAF squadron) of the assault wings of the Regia Aeronautica. It took part in the Spanish Civil War, but its unsatisfactory performance led to its quick replacement with the Breda Ba.64, Ba.65 and Ba.88 types.

Four examples were purchased by El Salvador in 1938 for use in the Escuadrilla de Caza of the Salvadoran Air Force, in response to Honduras buying North American NA-16. A fifth aircraft was supplied for no additional cost to replace an aircraft which crashed during an air display by an Italian test pilot to celebrate delivery of the AP.1s. The AP-1s at first proved popular in service, and after El Salvador's entry into the Second World War in December 1941, were used to carry out anti-submarine patrols along El Salvador's coast. Shortage of spare parts for the aircraft's engines and damage to the wooden structure due to the tropical conditions and termites limited serviceability by mid-1943, and they were withdrawn from use in December 1944. In 1937, Paraguay placed an order for 22 AP.1s (18 landplanes and 4 floatplanes) as part of a re-equipment programme following the end of the Chaco War, but after the overthrow of Rafael Franco's government in August 1937 led to the order being cut to seven landplanes, with 10 landplanes and four floatplanes joining the Regia Aeronautica. Paraguay's AP.1s entered service in 1939, with three aircraft remaining in service during the Paraguayan Civil War in 1947, flying a few reconnaissance and ground attack missions against the rebel forces. They were withdrawn from use in 1949.

== Variants ==
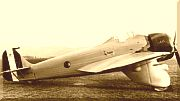
Caproni Ca.301 fighter prototype

- Ca.301 - Two single-seat fighter prototypes
- Ca.305 - AP.1bis - Initial production version
- Ca.307 - Second production version
- Ca.308 - Seven aircraft sold to Paraguay

== Operators ==
- Kingdom of Italy: Regia Aeronautica
  - 7° Gruppo (5° Stormo Assalto)
    - 86° Squadriglia
    - 98° Squadriglia
  - 19° Gruppo (5° Stormo Assalto)
    - 100° Squadriglia
    - 102° Squadriglia
  - 12° Gruppo (50° Stormo Assalto)
    - 160° Squadriglia
    - 165° Squadriglia
  - 16° Gruppo (50° Stormo Assalto)
    - 168° Squadriglia
    - 169° Squadriglia
- Aviazione Legionaria
- Paraguay: Paraguayan Military Aviation
  - 2° Escuadrilla de Caza
- El Salvador: Salvadoran Air Force
- Spanish State : Spanish Air Force

== Specifications ==
Data from Italian Civil and Military Aircraft 1930–1945

General characteristics

- Crew: two
- Length: 9.22 m (30 ft 3 in)
- Wingspan: 13.02 m (42 ft 8 1/2 in)
- Height: 3.61 m (11 ft 10 in)
- Wing area: 26.99 m^{2} (290.5 sq ft)
- Empty weight: 1,846 kg (4,070 lb)
- Gross weight: 2,744 kg (6,050 lb)
- Powerplant: 1 × Alfa Romeo 126 RC.34 , 480 kW (650 hp)

Performance

- Maximum speed: 389 km/h (242 mph, 210 kn) at 4,000 metres (13,120 ft)
- Range: 1,500 km (932 mi, 810 nmi)
- Service ceiling: 8,090 m (26,540 ft)
- Time to altitude: 7 min 50 sec to 4,000 metres (13,120 ft)

Armament

- 2 × 7.7 mm (.303 in) Breda SAFAT machine guns
- 1 × 12.7 mm (.50 in) machine gun
- 400 kilograms (880 lb) of bombs

== See also ==
Aircraft of comparable role, configuration, and era

- Breda Ba.64
- Henschel Hs 123
- Junkers Ju 87

Related lists

- List of Interwar military aircraft
