= Breda Ba.27 =

Italian fighter

Ba.27
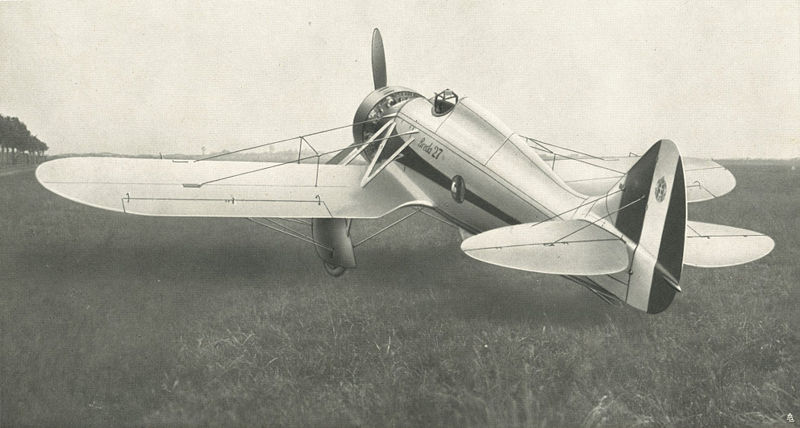
- Metallico

General information
- Type: Fighter
- Manufacturer: Breda
- Primary user: Chinese Nationalist Air Force
- Number built: 14

History
- First flight: 1933
- Variant: Breda Ba.65

The Breda Ba.27 was a fighter produced in Italy in the 1930s, used by the Chinese Nationalist Air Force in the Second Sino-Japanese War.

== Design and development ==
The Ba.27 was a low-wing braced monoplane with fixed tailwheel undercarriage. As originally designed, the Ba.27 had a fuselage of steel tube construction, skinned with light corrugated alloy metal, and wooden wings and tailplane. Evaluation of the two prototypes by the Regia Aeronautica in 1933 was strongly negative, resulting in an extensive redesign of the aircraft. The fuselage shape was made more rounded and the pilot's open cockpit was moved higher and forward to improve visibility. The corrugated skinning was also replaced with smooth sheet metal.

A prototype of this revised version, known as the Metallico, was first flown in June 1934, but Regia Aeronautica's appraisal was only a little more positive.

== Operational history ==
Despite the lack of domestic interest, the type was ordered by the Republic of China for use against Japan. Out of eighteen machines ordered, only eleven were actually delivered.

== Variants ==
Ba.27
Initial prototype, two built.
Ba.27 Metallico
Second improved version, twelve built.

== Operators ==
China

- Chinese Nationalist Air Force received eleven aircraft.

== Specifications (Metallico) ==
General characteristics

- Crew: one pilot
- Length: 7.67 m (25 ft 2 in)
- Wingspan: 10.80 m (35 ft 5 in)
- Height: 3.40 m (11 ft 2 in)
- Wing area: 18.9 m^{2} (203 sq ft)
- Empty weight: 1,320 kg (2,910 lb)
- Gross weight: 1,850 kg (4,078 lb)
- Powerplant: 1 × Alfa Romeo Mercurius radial engine , 403 kW (540 hp)

Performance

- Maximum speed: 380 km/h (236 mph, 205 kn)
- Range: 750 km (466 mi, 405 nmi)
- Service ceiling: 9,000 m (29,530 ft)
- Rate of climb: 11.1 m/s (2,180 ft/min)

Armament

- 2 × fixed, forward-firing 12.7 mm (.5 in) Breda-SAFAT machine guns

== See also ==
Related lists

- List of Interwar military aircraft

== Bibliography ==
- Curami, Andrea (1981). "Il Breda 27: Un monoplano da caccia moderno e veloce che non ebbe seguito". Aerofan (in Italian). No. 4. pp. 2–12.
- Passingham, Malcolm (April 1995). "Le Breda 27: 1ère partie". Avions: Toute l'aéronautique et son histoire (in French). No. 25. pp. 10–15. ISSN 1243-8650.
- Robanesccu, Iulian (June 1995). "Le Breda 27M: écorché". Avions: Toute l'aéronautique et son histoire (in French). No. 27. pp. 27–29. ISSN 1243-8650.
- Soulard, Stéphane (May 1995). "Le Breda 27 (2^{e} partie): Le Breda 27 en Chine" [The Breda 27 in China]. Avions: Toute l'aéronautique et son histoire (in French). No. 26. pp. 30–32. ISSN 1243-8650.
- Taylor, Michael J. H. (1989). Jane's Encyclopedia of Aviation. London: Studio Editions. p. 195.
- World Aircraft Information Files. London: Bright Star Publishing. pp. File 890 Sheet 77.
