= Caproni Ca.314 =

Italian attack/torpedo bomber

Ca.314
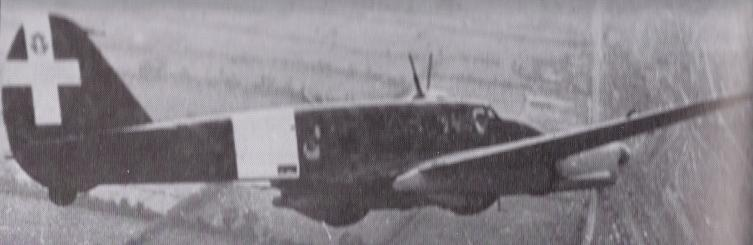

General information
- Type: Attack aircraft/light bomber/torpedo bomber
- Manufacturer: Caproni
- Primary user: Italian Air Force

History
- Developed from: Caproni Ca.310

The Caproni Ca.314 was an Italian twin-engine attack/torpedo bomber aircraft, used in World War II.

Derived from the similar Ca.310, the Ca.314 was used mainly for ground attack and torpedo bomber missions. It was the most extensively-built Ca.310 derivative, and included variants dedicated to light bomber, convoy escort/maritime patrol, torpedo bomber, and ground-attack.

== Design and development ==
Caproni Ca.314 was developed in parallel with the Ghibli, the Ca.310 Libeccio. It was structurally similar to the earlier machine powered by two 350kW Piaggio P.VII C.35 radial engines. The prototype of Ca.310bis served as the development aircraft for Ca.311. It was similar to Ca.310bis, but most were later modified by the introduction of windshields, then redesigned Ca.311Mis.

== Variants ==
Ca.314

Ca 314A
Light bomber.
Ca 314-SC (Scorta)
The Ca.314Sc ("Scorta" - escort) was a machine for convoy escort and maritime patrol duties. This version was made in 1942, due to the factory's difficulties, deliveries were sparse and irregular.
Ca 314B
Ca.314B or Ca.314-RA - was a torpedo bomber carrying one torpedo weighing up to 900 kg, a 500 kg bomb or two 250 kg bombs.80 built.
Ca 314C
It provided close support to ground forces, for this purpose it was equipped with two 12.7 mm machine guns mounted under the wings. At the expense of fuel supplies, the bomb load capacity was also increased. Most machines of this version had Delta RC.35I-DS engines. series III with a power of 780 Horse power.254 built.

Ca.314G

It was the most heavily armed, but excessive weight reduced its performance.

== Operators ==
Kingdom of Italy

- Regia Aeronautica

Italy

- Italian Air Force

== Specifications (Ca.314A) ==
Data from Italian Civil and Military aircraft 1930–1945

General characteristics

- Crew: three
- Length: 11.8 m (38 ft 9 in)
- Wingspan: 16.65 m (54 ft 8 in)
- Height: 3.7 m (12 ft 2 in)
- Wing area: 39.2 m^{2} (422 sq ft)
- Empty weight: 4,560 kg (10,053 lb)
- Gross weight: 6,620 kg (14,595 lb)
- Powerplant: 2 × Isotta-Fraschini Delta R.C.25 (I-DS) inverted air-cooled V-12 piston engine, 540 kW (724 hp) each

Performance

- Maximum speed: 395 km/h (245 mph, 213 kn)
- Range: 1,690 km (1,050 mi, 910 nmi)
- Service ceiling: 6,400 m (21,000 ft)

Armament

- Guns:
  2 × 12.7 mm (0.500 in) fixed forward-firing Breda SAFAT machine-guns in the wing roots
  1 × 7.7 mm (0.303 in) Breda SAFAT machine gun in a dorsal turret
- Bombs: Up to 500 kg (1,100 lb)

== See also ==
Related development

- Caproni Ca.310

Aircraft of comparable role, configuration, and era

- Bristol Beaufighter
- Douglas A-20 Havoc
- Dornier Do 215
- Heinkel He 219
- Kawasaki Ki-45
- Martin Baltimore
- Petlyakov Pe-3

Related lists

- List of Regia Aeronautica aircraft used in World War II
- List of aircraft of World War II
