= Class 345 =

Class 345 may refer to:

- British Rail Class 345, electrical multiple unit trains
- FS Class D.345, Italian diesel-electric locomotives
