= Breda Ba.201 =

Italian dive bomber prototype

Ba.201
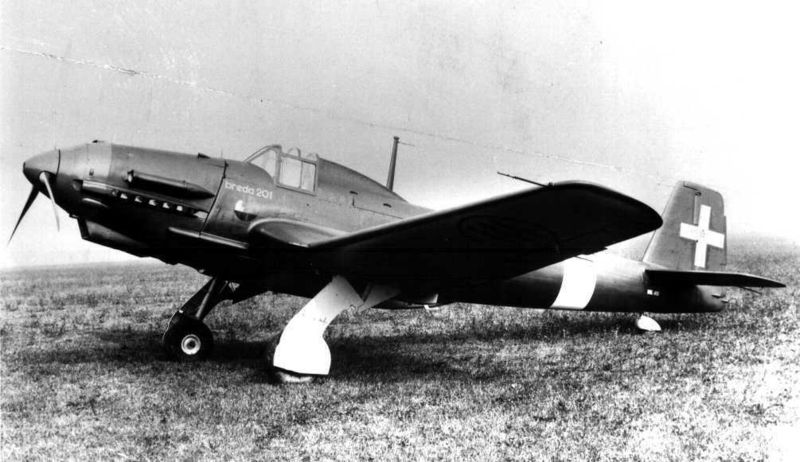

General information
- Type: Dive bomber
- Manufacturer: Breda
- Number built: 2
- Flights: 34 (July-September 1941,) unknown from January 1942
- Total hours: ≈ 40 hours

History
- First flight: 3 July 1941

The Breda Ba.201 was an Italian dive bomber designed during World War II, that never entered production.

== Development ==
In 1939, a new contest for a dive bomber was called, requiring a single-engine aircraft with a maximum speed of 500 km/h (310 mph), or 450 km/h (280 mph) if twin-engined, capable of carrying 500 kg (1,100 lb) bombs, with an endurance of 1,200 km (750 mi) with a single engine, or 2,400 km (1,490 mi) with two engines. There was only one twin-engine proposal, the Piaggio P.122, which despite its all-metal construction, dorsal-wing airbrakes, two Piaggio P.XI R.C.40 engines giving a total of 1,491 kW (2,000 hp), and the lack of competitors, was considered unfit for service and was unbuilt.

The Ba.201 first entered testing in July 1941, and had 13.5 hours of flight time over 34 test flights. After revisions the Ba.201 re-entered testing in March 1942. These two testing phases gave the Ba.201 a total of about 40 hours of flight time.

Two single-engined types were proposed, the Caproni Ca.355, a single seat derivative of the Ca.335 light bomber that first flew in January 1941 and the Breda Ba.201.

== Design ==
The Ba.201 was a single-engined cantilever monoplane of all-metal construction. It had inverted gull wings with split flaps that doubled as dive-brakes, and was fitted with a retractable tailwheel undercarriage. It had a long slim fuselage, with a low mounted tailplane. The cockpit was set as far forward as possible to give a good view for the pilot.

The dive capabilities were found to be satisfactory, and the air brakes were highly effective, perhaps too effective – with the risk of slowing the aircraft down so much it became too easy a target. It was capable of carrying a single 500 kg (1,100 lb) bomb and was armed with two 12.7 mm (.5 in) Breda-SAFAT machine guns fixed in the wings. After such engines as the 895 kW (1,200 hp) Fiat A.38, the 716 kW (960 hp) Isotta-Fraschini IF L.121, and the powerful 839 kW (1,125 hp) Isotta-Fraschini Zeta, were evaluated, the Daimler-Benz DB 601 engine was chosen, because it was compact, and allowed free dives thanks to its direct injection system.

The prototype first flew on 3 July 1941, and after an initial series of test flights at Breda's works, (34 test flights with a total flight time of 13 hours, 30 minutes) was demonstrated in front of General Mario Bernasconi on 26 September 1941 before being transferred to the Centro Sperimentale, the flight test centre, at Guidonia. The aircraft showed that it had enough agility, once freed of its bombload, to hold its own against other Italian fighters. However speed was disappointing, only 460 km/h (290 mph) – slower than the requested for 500 km/h (310 mph) – and slightly slower than older front-line fighters. The aircraft was barely capable of defending itself against enemy fighters, and then only after releasing its bomb. It had very good forward visibility, but rear visibility was poor.

In comparison, the Junkers Ju 87D had a top speed of only 410 km/h (260 mph), but was armed with two new 7.92 mm (.312 in) MG 81z machine guns, with 3,200 rounds per gun instead of 1,050. The Junkers rear-gunner gave it a greater defensive capability, while the Ba.201 pilot relied on himself alone. The Reggiane Re.2001 fighter bomber fitted with the same DB 601 engine was able to reach almost 550 km/h (342 mph), and carry 640 kg (1,411 lb) bombs.

The first prototype MM.451 was followed by only one other before the programme was cancelled.

== Specifications (Ba.201) ==
Data from Tuffatore

General characteristics

- Crew: 1
- Length: 11.09 m (36 ft 5 in)
- Wingspan: 13 m (42 ft 8 in)
- Height: 3.1 m (10 ft 2 in)
- Wing area: 24.84 m^{2} (267.4 sq ft)
- Empty weight: 2,380 kg (5,247 lb)
- Max takeoff weight: 3,650 kg (8,047 lb)
- Powerplant: 1 × Daimler-Benz DB 601A V-12 inverted liquid-cooled piston engine, 867 kW (1,163 hp)
- Propellers: 3-bladed constant-speed propeller

Performance

- Maximum speed: 460 km/h (290 mph, 250 kn) at 4,000 m (13,000 ft)
- Range: 1,200 km (750 mi, 650 nmi)
- Time to altitude: 4,000 m (13,000 ft) in 7 min 50 s

Armament

- Guns: 2 × 12.7 mm (.5 in) Breda-SAFAT machine guns
- Bombs: 1 × 500 kg (1,102 lb) bomb

== See also ==
Aircraft of comparable role, configuration, and era

- Junkers Ju 87
- Loire-Nieuport LN.401

Related lists

- List of Regia Aeronautica aircraft used in World War II
