= Piaggio P.119 =

Italian experimental fighter

General information
- Type: Fighter
- Manufacturer: Piaggio
- Designer: Giovanni Casiraghi
- Status: Prototype only
- Number built: 1

History
- First flight: 19 December 1942

The Piaggio P.119 was an Italian experimental fighter of World War II. It had a relatively novel layout, with a "buried" radial engine mounted mid-fuselage. Only a single prototype was built before the Armistice between Italy and the allied armed forces, which ended the project.

== Development ==
Among the many Italian aircraft manufacturers, during World War II, the majority (such as Savoia-Marchetti and Caproni) designed and built mixed-construction aircraft, or, in the case of CANT, completely made of wood. While Fiat and Macchi built more advanced aircraft, they still tended to have conventional, often obsolete structures, even if of all-metal construction. Only Reggiane and Piaggio mastered advanced, all-metal structures. Of them, Piaggio tended to explore the innovative concepts. The Piaggio P.119 was one of the best examples of these projects. The '5' series fighters are well known, especially the Fiat G.55 and the Macchi C.205, but there were two other fighters on the same level, the Caproni Vizzola F.6 and the Piaggio P.119, neither of which entered production.

The P.119 was designed (in 1939), to minimise drag by fitting the engine in mid-fuselage in a similar layout to the P-39 Airacobra. It was hoped to improve maneuverability by positioning the engine near the aircraft's centre of gravity, which would also allow a heavy nose-mounted armament. In 1940, Piaggio still had to solve three major issues: contra-rotating propellers, power transmission, and engine cooling.

Giovanni Casiraghi, chief designer of Piaggio, tried to solve the first issue with the P.118 fighter, but without success. It was intended to be powered by two Piaggio P.XI RC 40 engines, each connected to a propeller, but it was not built. The P.119 was built instead and first flew at the end of 1942. Three different configurations were studied before one was chosen.

== Design ==
The P.119 was a cantilever monoplane, constructed completely of metal, with a conventional wide undercarriage. It had a forward-mounted cockpit, with the weapons mounted just behind the three-bladed propeller. It had advanced construction for the time, with many removable panels for internal inspection. The number of components were reduced to a minimum, and also standardized, to make construction as easy as possible. No other Italian aircraft was so advanced in these details.

The P.119 was powered by a 1,119 kW (1,500 hp) Piaggio P.XV RC 45 radial engine located behind the cockpit. Air intakes for cooling were fitted under the nose. The propeller was a 3.3 m (10 ft 10in) diameter Piaggio P.1002 driven by a shaft running under the cockpit. A further development was planned with a Piaggio P.XV RC 50, giving 1,230 kW (1,650 hp) at takeoff and 1,099 kW (1,475 hp) at 5,000 m (16,400 ft) altitude, with a planned maximum speed of 630 km/h (390 mph) maximum speed but never implemented.

The aircraft had a 330 L (90 US gal) fuel tank in each wing, and a 340 L (90 US gal) tank in the fuselage, giving a total of 1,000 L (260 US gal), a 2½ times greater capacity than that of a Bf 109 or a MC.205.

Overall weight of the aircraft was quite high, but the wing was wide, with a 13 m (43 ft) wingspan. The surface area was almost 28 m^{2} (300 ft^{2}), giving a wing loading of around 150 kg/m^{2}. The wing was built on a single spar which also supported the engine, and a semi-spar/semi-monocoque skin.

The armament was concentrated in the nose; a 20 mm Breda cannon with 110 rounds and four 12.7 mm (0.5 in) Breda heavy machine guns with 2,000 rounds. The Breda gun was more powerful than the German 20 mm MG 151, but had a lower rate of fire. There was also provision to install another four 7.7 mm (0.303 in) Breda machine guns in the wings with 1,200 rounds in total. An anti-tank version was proposed with a Breda 37 mm (1.46 in) gun, but not built.

== Operational history ==
The machine was flight-tested, but it was found that firing all the weapons produced excessive vibration. A landing accident slightly damaged one wing on 2 August 1943. One month later, the armistice with the Allies brought an end to the project.

All in all, the P.119 was an interesting and somewhat mysterious aircraft, for many years totally unknown to the public. It was not sent to Guidonia for official evaluation.

Performance could have been very good. The engine and the weapons were built under foreign license, but they could have been called 'authentic' in respect to the German DB 605 engine and 20 mm MG 151 guns mounted in the '5' series fighters. Performance was good enough to compete with other Italian fighters and endurance was much better. However, the aircraft was not ready until eight months after the other '5' fighters, and this was catastrophic for the program. The aircraft was not rated officially by the Regia Aeronautica, and MM.496 was the only one built. Apart from this, the range, endurance and overall visibility were superior, and the performance and weaponry were not so different.

== Specifications (P.119) ==
Data from The Complete Book of Fighters.

General characteristics

- Crew: one
- Length: 9.7 m (31 ft 10 in)
- Wingspan: 13 m (42 ft 8 in)
- Height: 2.9 m (9 ft 6 in)
- Wing area: 27.8 m^{2} (299 sq ft)
- Empty weight: 2,438 kg (5,375 lb)
- Gross weight: 4,091 kg (9,019 lb)
- Fuel capacity: 1,000 L (220 imp gal; 260 US gal)
- Powerplant: 1 × Piaggio P.XV RC.45 18-cyl. air-cooled radial piston engine, 1,120 kW (1,500 hp)

Performance

- Maximum speed: 644 km/h (400 mph, 348 kn) at 6,795 m (22,300 ft)
- Range: 1,513 km (940 mi, 817 nmi)
- Service ceiling: 12,603 m (41,348 ft)
- Time to altitude: 3,050 m (10,000 ft) in 3 minutes 15 seconds
- Wing loading: 147 kg/m^{2} (30 lb/sq ft)
- Power/mass: 0.27 kW/kg (0.17hp/lb)

Armament

- Guns: *1 × 20 mm (0.787 in) Breda-SAFAT cannon
- 4 × 12.7 mm (0.500 in) Breda-SAFAT machine gun

== See also ==
Aircraft of comparable role, configuration, and era

- Bell P-39 Airacobra
- Bell P-63 Kingcobra

Related lists

- List of fighter aircraft
- List of Regia Aeronautica aircraft used in World War II
