= FS Class ETR 240 =

Italian electric train

ETR 240
- In service: 1980s–1990s (as ETR 240)
- Manufacturer: Società Italiana Ernesto Breda
- Number built: 5 trainsets
- Formation: Four-car trainset
- Operator: Ferrovie dello Stato

Specifications
- Train length: 86 m (282 ft 1 7/8 in)
- Maximum speed: 180 km/h (110 mph)
- Weight: 160 t (160 long tons; 180 short tons)
- Power output: 1,050 kW (1,408 hp)
- Electric system: 3000 V DC catenary
- Current collection: Pantograph
- Track gauge: 1,435 mm (4 ft 8 1/2 in) standard gauge

The ETR 240 (Italian: ElettroTreno Rapido 240; meaning Fast Electric Train, series 240) is an Italian electric multiple unit (EMU) introduced in the 1980s.

== Development ==
In the 1930s, the Italian state railways, Ferrovie dello Stato, electrified the main line Milan-Bologna-Florence-Rome-Naples and needed a fast train to use on it and on other newly electrified ones. The first ETR 200 was built by Società Italiana Ernesto Breda, (now AnsaldoBreda), in 1936, with three cars on four bogies, two of which had a single T 62-R-100 motor while the others were provided with two similar motors each. The ETR 200 entered in service in 1937. In the early 1960s the remaining sixteen ETR 200 units were converted to ETR 220 by adding a fourth car and other changes.

The ETR 240 entered in service in the late 1980s and remained in service until the late 1990s and were used for charter trains up and in the Civitavecchia -Rome line.

There were obtained by modification (mainly in interior trims and contents) of 6 of ETR220 (AV version).
