= Breda Ba.64 =

Italian ground-attack aircraft (1936–39)

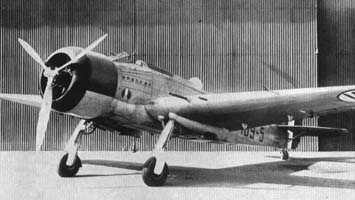
- A Ba.64 in its standard two-seat configuration.

General information
- Type: Ground attack aircraft
- Manufacturer: Ernesto Breda
- Designer: Antonio Parano and Giuseppe Panzeri
- Primary user: Regia Aeronautica
- Number built: 42

History
- Introduction date: 1937
- First flight: 1934
- Retired: 1939

The Breda Ba.64 was an Italian single-engine ground-attack aircraft used by the Regia Aeronautica during the 1930s.

Designed by Antonio Parano and Giuseppe Panzeri, it saw limited service in two units from 1936, together with the contemporary Caproni A.P.1. It was retired from active service in 1939, replaced by the more powerful derivative, the Ba.65.

== Design and development ==
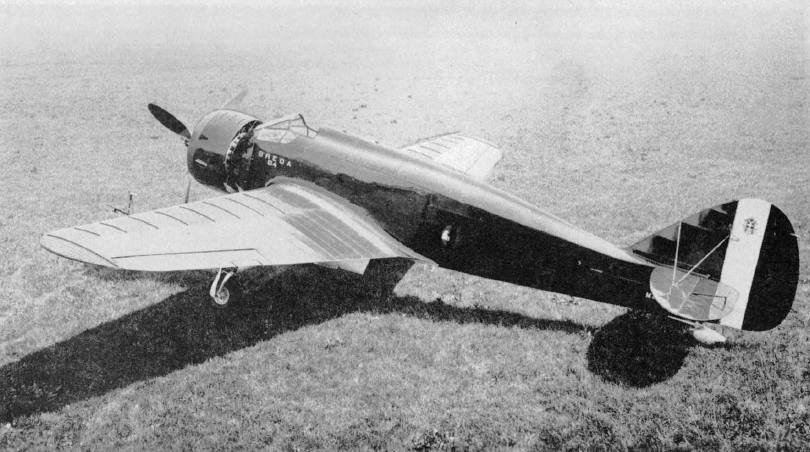
The Ba.64 (MM 250) second prototype in its original single-seat configuration.

A development of the earlier Ba.27 fighter (1932), the Ba.64 was designed in 1933 to requirements set out by the Regia Aeronautica for an aircraft able to undertake multiple roles: fighter, bomber and reconnaissance. The aircraft featured an all-metal, low-wing cantilever monoplane with a wire braced tail unit and fixed tail wheel. The open cockpit was placed well forward on the fuselage in line with the wing roots to provide an excellent field of vision down as well as forward. The headrest behind the cockpit was extended as a streamlined fairing all the way down the fuselage upper decking to the tail.

Two prototypes powered by a 522 kW (700 hp) Bristol Pegasus were developed, the first (MM 249) was a two-seater with fixed landing gear. The second (MM 250) was a single-seater fitted with a semi-retractable main landing gear that when in its rearward retracted position, provided less drag as well as protection in case of a wheels-up landing.

The first prototype flew in 1934 but flight tests revealed a lacklustre performance. Nonetheless, a limited production order was placed as two-seater with the semi-retractable landing gear. The production variant was powered by a 485 kW (650 hp) Alfa Romeo 125. Production of the 42 Ba.64s was complete by 1936.

== Operational history ==
Production aircraft were sent to 5° and 50° Stormos but pilots considered them ill-equipped to undertake missions as a bomber or fighter. The faults including being underpowered, heavy handling characteristics and a tendency to enter high-speed stalls that led to a number of fatal crashes. After limited use in front-line service, the Ba.64s were converted into two-seat trainers and relegated to second-line duties although a small number survived until March 1943.

== Variants ==
Ba. 64 (Alfa W125)
First engine type used in the production variant, the Alfa W 125 was the production license version of the Walter Pegasus.
Ba. 64 (Alfa 125 RC 35)
Second engine type used in the production variant, the Alfa W 125 and the Alfa 125 RC 35, although similar, were not interchangeable.
Ba. 64 (Fiat A.74)
A single prototype tested in 1937.
Ba. 64 d.c.
Doppio Comando (Dual Control) aircraft modified into two-seat trainers since 1938.

== Operators ==
Kingdom of Italy

== Specifications (Ba.64) ==
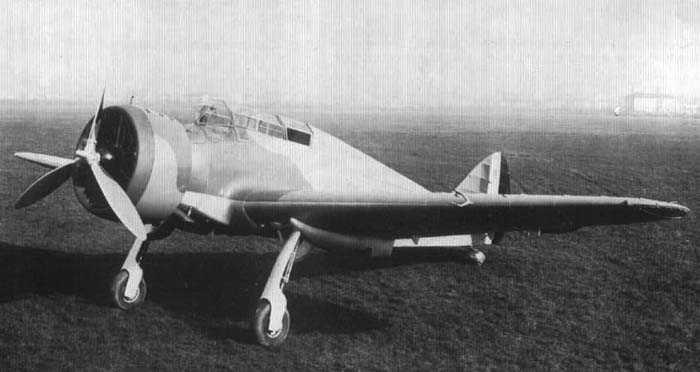
MM-250, the second prototype of the Ba.64, here depicted after its modification into two-seat trainer.

Data from

General characteristics

- Crew: 2 (pilot and tail gunner)
- Length: 9.72 m (31 ft 11 in)
- Wingspan: 12.1 m (39 ft 8 in)
- Height: 3.14 m (10 ft 4 in)
- Wing area: 23.5 m^{2} (253 sq ft)
- Empty weight: 2,030 kg (4,475 lb)
- Max takeoff weight: 3,034 kg (6,689 lb)
- Powerplant: 1 × Alfa Romeo 125 R.C.35 9-cylinder air-cooled radial piston engine, 485 kW (650 hp)
- Propellers: 3-bladed variable-pitch propeller

Performance

- Maximum speed: 363 km/h (226 mph, 196 kn)
- Range: 900 km (560 mi, 490 nmi)
- Service ceiling: 7,000 m (23,000 ft)

Armament

- Guns:

- 2 × 12.7 mm (.50 in) Breda-SAFAT machine guns
- 3 × 7.7 mm (.303 in) Breda-SAFAT machine guns

- Bombs:

- 544 kg (1,200 lb)

== See also ==
Aircraft of comparable role, configuration, and era

- Junkers Ju 87

Related lists

- List of aircraft of World War II
- List of attack aircraft
- List of Interwar military aircraft
- List of Regia Aeronautica aircraft used in World War II
