= Fiat CR.25 =

Italian twin-engine reconnaissance-fighter aircraft, 1937

CR.25
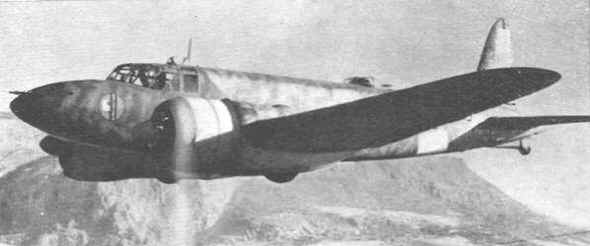
- Fiat CR.25 over the Alps c. 1941

General information
- Type: Fighter
- Manufacturer: Fiat
- Primary user: Regia Aeronautica
- Number built: 12

History
- First flight: 22 July 1937

The Fiat CR.25 was an Italian twin-engine reconnaissance-fighter aircraft which served in small numbers for the Regia Aeronautica during World War II.

== History ==
40 CR.25s were ordered (later reduced to ten, the two prototypes and other eight airplanes) after the operative failure of the apparently more promising Breda Ba.88 bomber. Later, it was decided to use the CR.25 as a reconnaissance plane and as escort fighter, with a total of nine aircraft (a prototype and the eight pre-production aircraft) for this role. It was used during the war by the 173^{a} Squadriglia Ricognizione Strategica Terrestre (Strategic Land Reconnaissance Squadron), operating from Sicily. Despite positive reports from the pilots, and a proposal by Fiat to resume production, no further aircraft were produced.

The prototype MM 332, refurbished as personnel transport, was assigned to the Italian embassy in Berlin.

== Variants ==
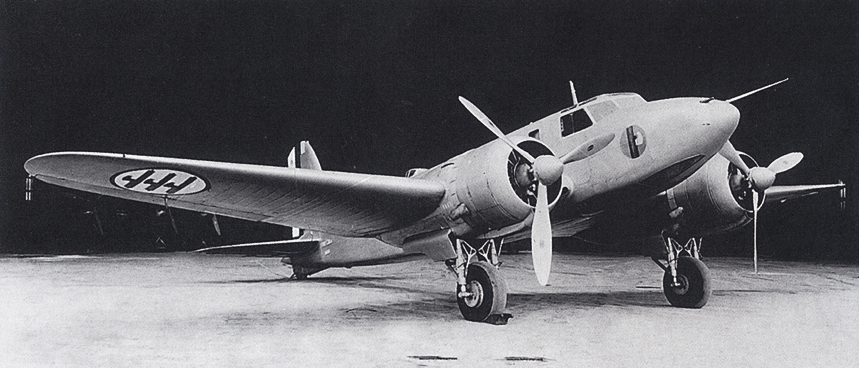

- CR.25 : Twin-engined reconnaissance bomber aircraft, two prototypes built.
- CR.25bis : Strategic reconnaissance aircraft, long-range escort fighter aircraft, eight preproduction aircraft built.
- CR.25 D : The prototype MM (Matricola Militare) 332 aircraft, redesignated CR.25 D as a transport for the Italian air attaché in Berlin.
- CR.25quater : The CR.25quater, was a more heavily armed version with a slight increase in wing area and 1175 HP engines proposed from FIAT in the spring of 1943. It remained on the drawing tables.

== Operators ==
Kingdom of Italy

- Regia Aeronautica

== Specifications (CR.25bis) ==

Data from The Complete Book of Fighters

General characteristics

- Crew: 3
- Length: 13.56 m (44 ft 6 in)
- Wingspan: 16.00 m (52 ft 6 in)
- Height: 3.40 m (11 ft 2 in)
- Wing area: 39.20 m^{2} (421.9 sq ft)
- Empty weight: 4,375 kg (9,645 lb)
- Gross weight: 6,525 kg (14,385 lb)
- Powerplant: 2 × Fiat A.74 R.C.38 14-cylinder air-cooled radial piston engine, 630 kW (840 hp) each
- Propellers: 3-bladed variable-pitch propellers

Performance

- Maximum speed: 460 km/h (290 mph, 250 kn) at 5,500 m (18,000 ft)
- Range: 2,100 km (1,300 mi, 1,100 nmi)
- Service ceiling: 8,100 m (26,575 ft)
- Time to altitude: 16 min 39 sec to 6,000 m (20,000 ft)

Armament

- Guns: 3 × 12.7 mm (0.5 in) Breda-SAFAT machine guns

== See also ==
Aircraft of comparable role, configuration, and era

- Breda Ba.88
- Caproni Ca.310
