= Breda-Pittoni BP.471 =

Italian twin-engine airliner/military transport aircraft, 1950

B.P.471
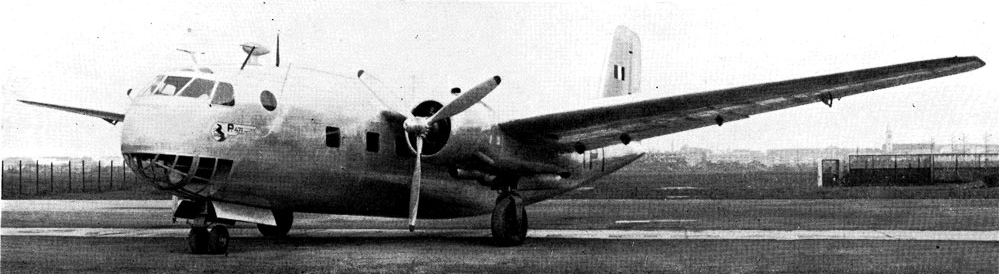

General information
- Type: Utility transport/airliner
- Manufacturer: Breda
- Designer: Mario Pittoni
- Number built: 1

History
- First flight: 1950
- Retired: 1954

The Breda-Pittoni B.P.471 was an Italian twin-engine airliner/military transport produced by Breda.

== Design and development ==
As part of its efforts to get back into aircraft manufacturing following the war, Breda commissioned Mario Pittoni to develop a twin-engine medium transport designated the Breda-Pittoni B.P.471. The prototype first flew in 1950. It was an all-metal twin-engine monoplane of stressed-skin construction. It had a retractable tricycle undercarriage and wings were of an inverted-gull configuration, this allowed the main landing gear to be short and light. The cabin had room for 18-passengers or freight. The company proposed many uses for the aircraft including a civil airliner and freighter, military navigation trainer or utility freighter. With no interest from buyers the prototype was operated by the Italian Air Ministry as a staff transport.

== Operators ==
Italy

- Italian Air Force

== Specifications (B.P.471) ==
Data from Jane's All The World's Aircraft 1951–52

General characteristics

- Crew: 2
- Capacity: 18 passengers
- Length: 17.5 m (57 ft 5 in)
- Wingspan: 23.0 m (75 ft 6 in)
- Height: 5.75 m (18 ft 10 in)
- Gross weight: 10,000 kg (22,046 lb)
- Powerplant: 2 × Pratt & Whitney R-1830-92 Twin Wasp 14-cylinder air-cooled radial engine, 890 kW (1,200 hp) each (take off power), 780 kW (1,050 hp) at 2,300 m (7,500 ft)

Performance

- Maximum speed: 473 km/h (294 mph, 255 kn)
- Cruise speed: 412 km/h (256 mph, 222 kn)
- Range: 2,000 km (1,200 mi, 1,100 nmi) at 395 km/h (245 mph; 213 kn)
- Service ceiling: 7,500 m (24,600 ft)
- Time to altitude: 9 min 39 sec to 4,000 m (13,100 ft)
