= Breda-Zappata BZ.309 =

Italian twin-engined airliner project, late 1940s

B.Z.309

General information
- Type: Twin-engined airliner
- National origin: Italy
- Manufacturer: Breda
- Designer: Filippo Zappata
- Number built: None

The Breda-Zappata B.Z.309 was an Italian twin-engined airliner project by Breda.

== Design and development ==
Aircraft designer Filippo Zappata developed a short range twin-engined civil transport for 11 to 15 passengers and a crew of two. The BZ.309 was a twin-engined all metal high wing transport aircraft that was designed for short-range airline routes within Italy. The aircraft was envisioned to be powered by two inline engines of an unspecified make producing between 900 and 1000 horsepower each, with a top speed of 217 mph. The empty weight was designed to be 8,050 lb, and maximum gross takeoff weight was 12,125 lb. It had tricycle landing gear, and single fin and rudder. The completion of the design phase was announced by the company in July 1947. The Breda company had financial problems which led to the project being abandoned.

== Specifications (estimated) ==
Data from Jane's all the World's Aircraft 1947

General characteristics

- Crew: 2
- Capacity: 11-15
- Length: 14.75 m (48 ft 5 in)
- Wingspan: 20 m (65 ft 7 in)
- Wing area: 36.7 m^{2} (395 sq ft)
- Empty weight: 3,650 kg (8,047 lb)
- Gross weight: 5,450 kg (12,015 lb)
- Max takeoff weight: 6,450 kg (14,220 lb)
- Powerplant: 2 × unspecified , 750 kW (1,000 hp) each

Performance

- Maximum speed: 400 km/h (250 mph, 220 kn)
- Cruise speed: 330 km/h (210 mph, 180 kn) at 2,500–3,000 m (8,200–9,800 ft)
- Service ceiling: 7,000 m (23,000 ft) +
- Wing loading: 161 kg/m^{2} (33 lb/sq ft) at 5,950 kg (13,120 lb)
