= Breda Ba.82 =

Italian medium bomber prototype

Ba.82
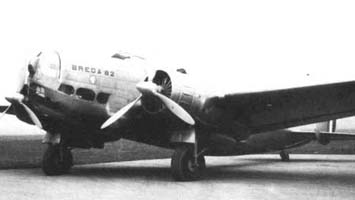
- The prototype in the late 1930s

General information
- Type: bomber
- Manufacturer: Breda
- Primary user: Italy
- Number built: 1

History
- First flight: 1937

The Breda Ba.82 was an Italian medium bomber prototype of the late 1930s; it was designed and built by the Breda company.

== Design and development ==
The Breda company began design work on the Ba.82 high-speed medium bomber in 1937. It was a four-seat mid-wing twin-engine monoplane with retractable landing gear, powered by two 745-kilowatt (1,000-horsepower) Fiat A.80 RC 41 engines. It was armed with three 7.7-millimeter (0.303-inch) Breda-SAFAT machine guns. Breda constructed a single Ba.82 prototype, which it presented publicly for the first time at the Aeronautica di Milano ("Aviation Milan") air show in 1937.

Even before its first flight, the Ba.82 ran into trouble with the Italian Air Ministry, which after examining its design decided that it was outdated. However, the Ministry considered placing a small production order with Breda provided that the Ba.82's performance and flight characteristics could be improved enough to allow it to complete official trials successfully.

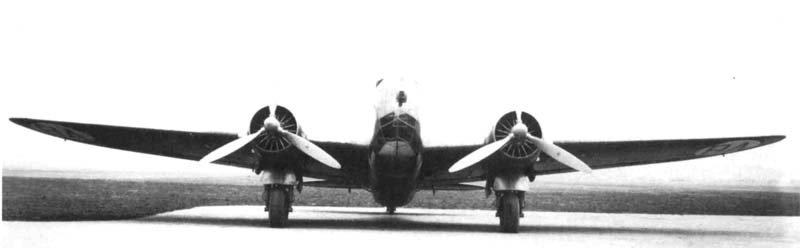
Head-on view of the prototype

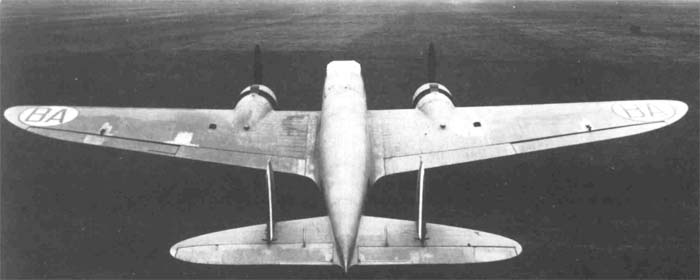
Another view of the prototype

During company test flights, the prototype suffered from frequent engine problems, and the company was forced to make numerous alterations to it. The problems delayed official testing of the prototype until 1939. By that time, the Air Ministry had decided that a trimotor layout would be standard for Regia Aeronautica (Italian Royal Air Force) medium bombers, making the Ba.82 prototype's twin-engine design undesirable; moreover, by 1939 the prototype fell short of Regia Aeronautica requirements for maximum speed, range, and bombload. No production order for the Ba.82 materialized, and the single prototype was soon scrapped.

== Specifications (Ba 82) ==
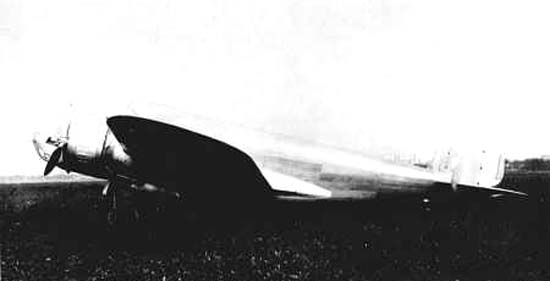
Side view

Data from Italian Civil & Military Aircraft 1930–1945

General characteristics

- Crew: 4
- Length: 14 m (45 ft 11 in)
- Wingspan: 21 m (68 ft 11 in)
- Height: 4.5 m (14 ft 9 in)
- Wing area: 66 m^{2} (710 sq ft)
- Empty weight: 6,840 kg (15,080 lb)
- Gross weight: 10,400 kg (22,928 lb)
- Powerplant: 2 × Fiat A.80 RC 41 air-cooled radial piston engine, 750 kW (1,000 hp) each

Performance

- Maximum speed: 425 km/h (264 mph, 229 kn)
- Cruise speed: 368 km/h (229 mph, 199 kn)
- Service ceiling: 9,800 m (32,200 ft)

Armament

- Guns:
- 3 x 7.7 mm (0.303 in) Breda-SAFAT machine guns

== See also ==
Aircraft of comparable role, configuration, and era

- Bristol Blenheim
- Tupolev SB
