= Breda Ba.75 =

Italian prototype two-seat reconnaissance and ground-attack aircraft

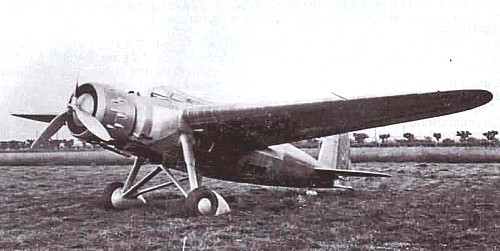

General information
- Type: Reconnaissance and ground-attack monoplane
- National origin: Italy
- Manufacturer: Breda
- Number built: 1

History
- First flight: 1939

The Breda Ba.75 was an Italian prototype two-seat reconnaissance and ground-attack aircraft designed and built by the Società Italiana Ernesto Breda. Only one aircraft was built and the type did not enter production.

== Development ==
Based on the design of the earlier Ba.65 the Ba.75 was slightly larger and was a mid-wing cantilever monoplane and unlike the Ba.65 had a fixed tailwheel landing gear. The Ba.75 was powered by a 900 hp (670 kW) Isotta-Fraschini K.14 radial piston engine. The bottom and lower sides of the fuselage were glazed to allow observation of the ground. The only Ba.75 was built and test flown in 1939.

== Specifications ==
Data from

General characteristics

- Crew: 2
- Length: 11.30 m (37 ft 1 in)
- Wingspan: 15.60 m (51 ft 2 in)
- Height: 3.10 m (10 ft 2 in)
- Powerplant: 1 × Isotta-Fraschini K.14 radial piston engine, 670 kW (900 hp)

Performance

- Maximum speed: 375 km/h (233 mph, 202 kn)
- Cruise speed: 300 km/h (190 mph, 160 kn)
- Range: 1,700 km (1,100 mi, 920 nmi)

Armament

- Guns: 2 × 12.7mm (0.5in) Breda-SAFAT machine guns
