= Breda A.4 =

Biplane trainer produced in Italy

A.4
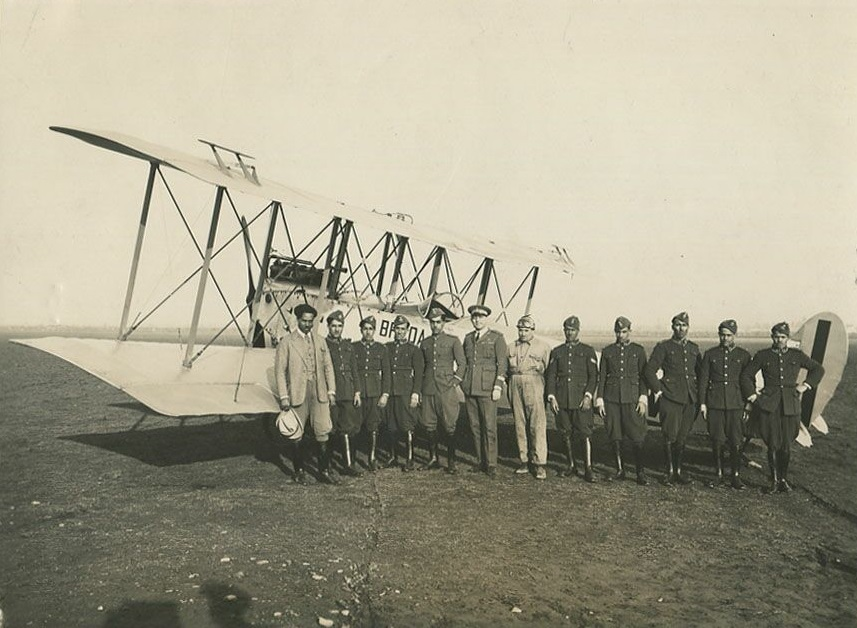
- Yemeni student pilots with a Breda A.4 trainer

General information
- Type: Training biplane
- Manufacturer: Breda

History
- First flight: 1926

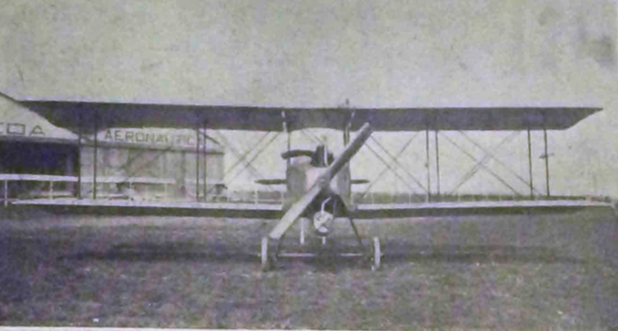
Breda A.4 front view

The Breda A.4 was a biplane trainer produced in Italy in the mid-1920s. It was of conventional configuration with a two-bay unstaggered wing cellule and seating for the pilot and instructor in tandem open cockpits. Apart from civil use, the A.4 was also adopted by the Regia Aeronautica as a trainer. At least some examples were produced in floatplane configuration as the A.4idro.

== Variants ==
A.4
Two-seat primary training biplane, powered by a 97 kW (130 hp) Colombo D.110 6-cylinder water-cooled in-line engine.
A.4 HS
Similar to the A.4, powered by a 134 kW (180 hp) Hispano-Suiza 8 V-8 water-cooled piston engine.
A.4idro
Floatplane version of A.4 HS.

== Operators ==
Kingdom of Italy

- Regia Aeronautica

== Specifications (A.4 HS landplane) ==
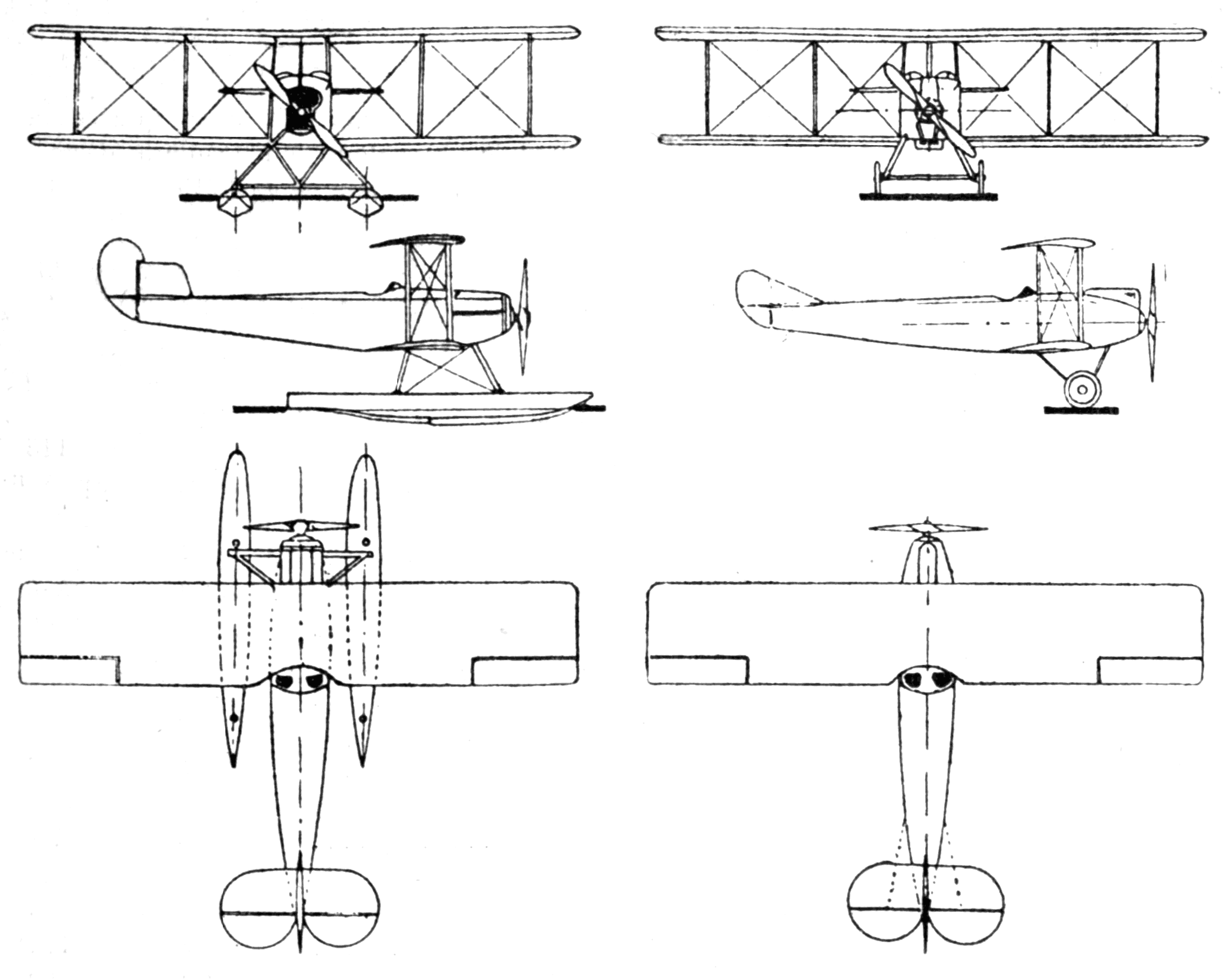
Breda A.4 3-view drawing from Le Document aéronautique May,1927

Data from Jane's all the World's Aircraft 1928

General characteristics

- Crew: 2
- Length: 8.25 m (27 ft 1 in) ; seaplane 9.3 m (31 ft)
- Wingspan: 10.9 m (35 ft 9 in)
- Height: 3.3 m (10 ft 10 in) ; seaplane 3.85 m (12.6 ft)
- Wing area: 40 m^{2} (430 sq ft)
- Empty weight: 750 kg (1,653 lb) landplane; 950 kg (2,090 lb) seaplane
- Gross weight: 1,010 kg (2,227 lb) landplane; 1,210 kg (2,670 lb) seaplane
- Powerplant: 1 × Hispano-Suiza 8 V-8 water-cooled piston engine, 130 kW (180 hp)
- Propellers: 2-bladed fixed pitch propeller

Performance

- Maximum speed: 160 km/h (99 mph, 86 kn) landplane; 140 km/h (87 mph; 76 kn) seaplane
- Stall speed: 60 km/h (37 mph, 32 kn) landplane; 65 km/h (40 mph; 35 kn) seaplane
- Endurance: 4 hours
- Service ceiling: 4,500 m (14,800 ft) landplane; 3,000 m (9,800 ft) seaplane
- Wing loading: 6.8 kg/m^{2} (1.4 lb/sq ft)
- Power/mass: 0.13 kW/kg (0.08 hp/lb) landplane; 0.0934 kW/kg (0.0568 hp/lb) floatplane

== See also ==
Related lists

- List of Interwar military aircraft
