= Breda A.14 =

Prototype three-engined biplane

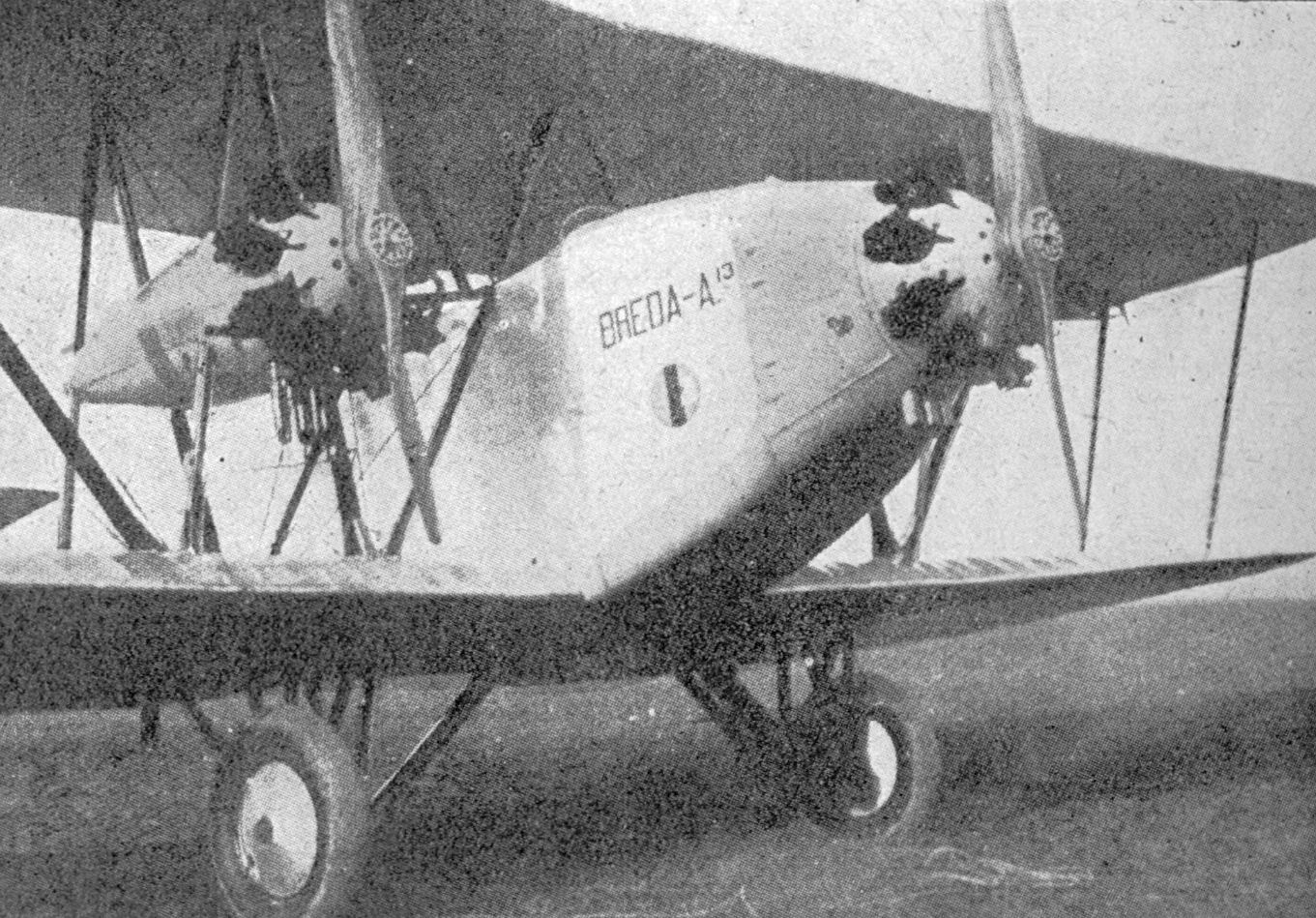

General information
- Type: Night bomber
- National origin: Italian
- Manufacturer: Società Italiana Ernesto Breda

History
- First flight: 1928

The Breda A.14 was a prototype three-engined biplane, designed by Società Italiana Ernesto Breda as a night bomber in 1928.

== Design and development ==
The aircraft was proposed to the Regia Aeronautica, but failed assessments, and was abandoned. The aircraft was designed to solve the flight problems experienced on the A.8. The A.14 was tested in 1928, powered by three 340 kW (450 hp) Alfa Romeo Jupiter engines. Although performance was improved, the Regia Aeronautica decided not to accept the A.14. To make up for the costs, it was suggested that a demilitarised version be sold to civilians, but a lack of civilian interest resulted in the abandonment of the project.

== Specifications ==
Data from Jane's all the World's Aircraft 1928

General characteristics

- Crew: 5-6
- Capacity: 2,600 kg (5,700 lb)
- Length: 15.7 m (51 ft 6 in)
- Wingspan: 23.06 m (75 ft 8 in)
- Height: 5.7 m (18 ft 8 in)
- Wing area: 148 m^{2} (1,590 sq ft)
- Empty weight: 3,900 kg (8,598 lb)
- Gross weight: 6,500 kg (14,330 lb)
- Powerplant: 3 × Alfa Romeo Jupiter piston radial engine, 340 kW (450 hp) each
- Propellers: 2-bladed fixed pitch wooden propellers

Performance

- Maximum speed: 190 km/h (120 mph, 100 kn)
- Stall speed: 80 km/h (50 mph, 43 kn)
- Endurance: 6h 30min
- Service ceiling: 5,000 m (16,000 ft)
- Wing loading: 44 kg/m^{2} (9.0 lb/sq ft)
- Power/mass: 0.1404 kW/kg (0.0854 hp/lb)

Armament

- Guns: 3x 7.7 mm (0.30 in) Lewis machine-guns
- Bombs: 800 kg (1,800 lb) of bombs
