= Breda A.2 =

Early 20th century aircraft

A.2
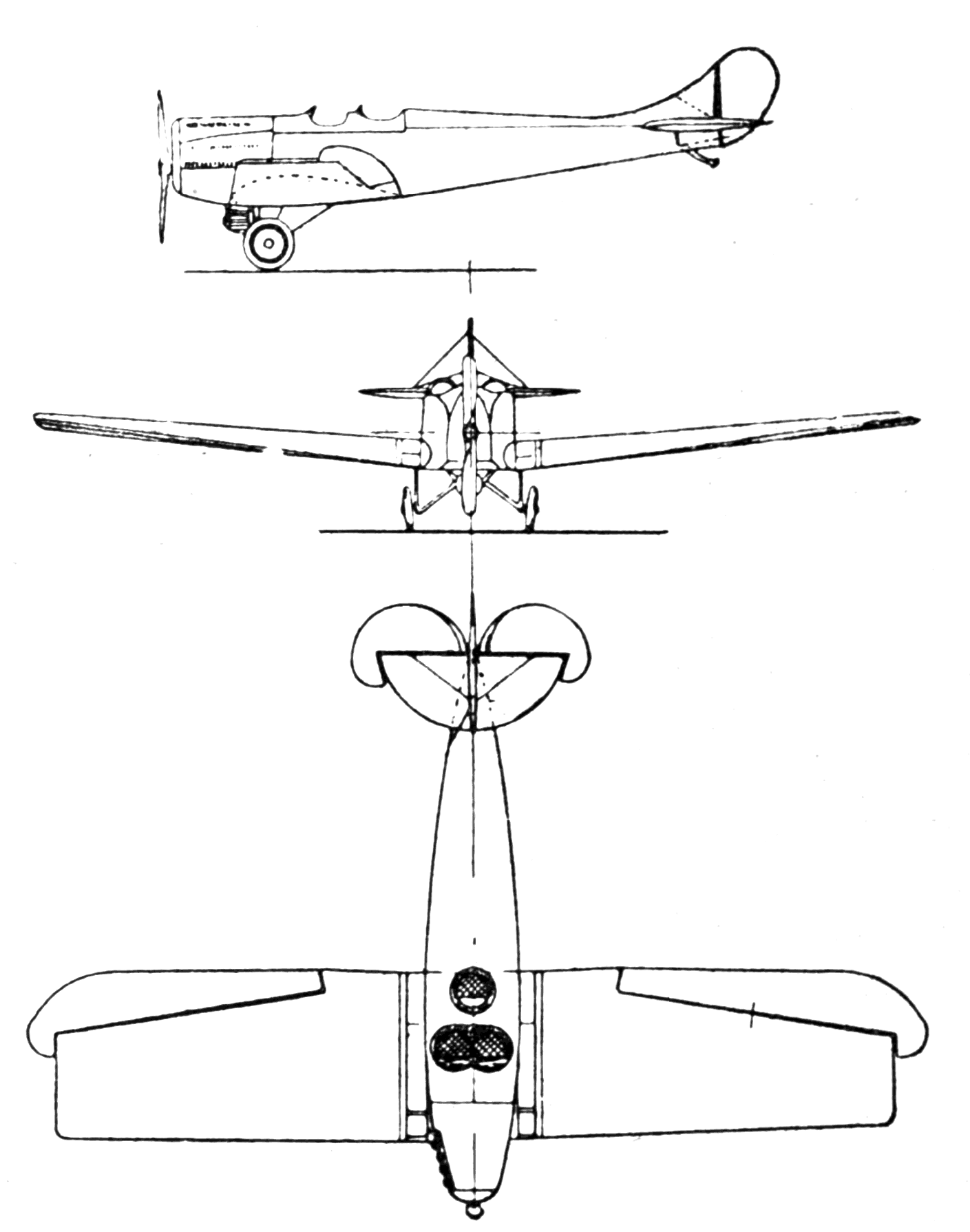

General information
- Type: Sports plane
- Manufacturer: Breda

History
- First flight: 1921

The Breda A.2 was a small sport and touring aircraft developed in Italy in 1921.

== Design and development ==
An advanced design for its time, the A.2 was a low-wing cantilever monoplane with fixed tailskid undercarriage. The pilot and passenger sat in tandem, open cockpits. Originally powered by an inverted inline engine of 97 kW (130 hp), a more powerful version was developed with a 187 kW (250 hp) engine as a reconnaissance aircraft.

== Operators ==
Kingdom of Italy

== Specifications (variant) ==
General characteristics

- Crew: 2
- Capacity: 340 kg (750 lb)
- Wing area: 34 m^{2} (370 sq ft)
- Empty weight: 950 kg (2,094 lb)
- Gross weight: 1,400 kg (3,086 lb)
- Powerplant: 1 × inverted in-line engine , 97 kW (130 hp) - 190 kW (250 hp)

Performance

- Service ceiling: 6,000 m (20,000 ft)
