= Breda Ba.88 Lince =

1936 Italian aircraft

Ba.88 Lince
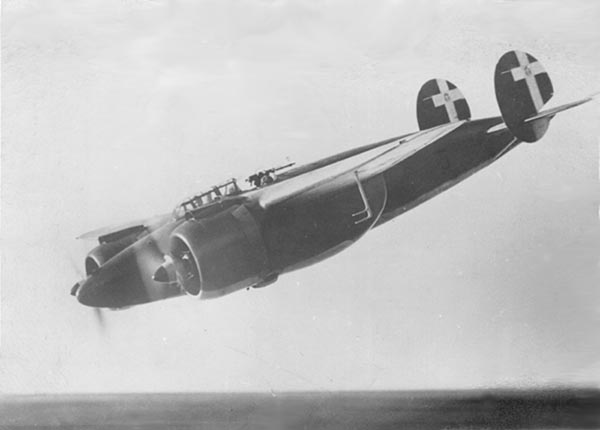
- A Breda Ba.88 "gondole grandi" entering a shallow dive

General information
- Type: Attacker
- National origin: Italy
- Manufacturer: Società Italiana Ernesto Breda
- Designer: Antonio Parano; Giuseppe Panzeri
- Status: Retired
- Primary user: Regia Aeronautica
- Number built: 149

History
- Manufactured: 1936–1940
- Introduction date: 1939
- First flight: October 1936
- Retired: 1941

The Breda Ba.88 Lince ("Lynx") was a ground-attack aircraft used by the Italian Regia Aeronautica during World War II. Its streamlined design and retractable undercarriage were advanced for the time, and after its debut in 1937 the aircraft established several world speed records. When military equipment was installed on production examples, problems of instability developed and the aeroplane's general performance deteriorated. Eventually its operational career was cut short, and the remaining Ba.88 airframes were used as fixed installations on airfields to mislead enemy reconnaissance. It represented one of the most remarkable failures of operational aircraft to see service in World War II.

== Design and development ==
The Breda Ba.88 was designed to fulfill a 1936 requirement by the Regia Aeronautica for a heavy fighter bomber capable of a maximum speed of 530 km/h (330 mph)—faster than any other aircraft existing or being planned at the time)—armament of 20 mm cannons and range of 2,000 km (1,200 mi). It first flew in October 1936. The project was derived from the aborted Ba.75 also designed by Giuseppe Panzeri and Antonio Parano.

=== Technical description ===
The Ba.88 was an all-metal, twin-engine, two-crew monoplane, with a high-mounted wing. It employed a "concentric" fuselage design, with a framework of steel tubes and a metallic skin covering which was both streamlined (having a very small fuselage cross-section) and strong. However, this internal load-bearing structure was very complex and of outdated design, as monocoque designs were starting to be developed elsewhere. The internal struts resulted in excessive weight compounded by manufacturing delays. The narrow confines of the fuselage would require the Ba.88 to carry bombs in a semi-external structure - to the detriment of the aircraft's aerodynamics. The all-metal wings had two longerons, and housed the engine nacelles, undercarriage main elements, and the majority of the 12 self-sealing fuel tanks (the only protection in the aircraft), providing 1,586 L (419 US gal) total capacity. All three undercarriage units were retractable, which was unusual for the time.

The aircraft was powered by two Piaggio P.XI air-cooled radial engines. They were of the same type as used in other projects such as the Re.2000, and drove two three-blade, constant-speed 3.2 m (10.4 ft) diameter Breda propellers. The engine nacelles also carried the two main undercarriage units. The aircraft had a twin tail to provide the dorsal 7.7 mm (0.303 in) Breda-SAFAT machine gun with a better field of fire.

The aircraft had three nose-mounted 12.7 mm (0.5 in) Breda-SAFAT machine guns with 400, 450 and 400 rounds of ammunition respectively. A 7.7 mm (0.303 in) Breda machine gun (500 rounds) with a high arc of fire, was fitted in the rear cockpit and controlled by a complex motorised electrical system. A modern "San Giorgio" reflector gunsight was fitted, and there was also provision to mount a 20 mm cannon instead of the central machine gun in the nose. The payload was three bombs of 50 kg (110 lb) or three of 100 kg (220 lb) or two of 250 kg (550 lb), or a Nardi dispenser for 119 2 kg (4.4 lb) bomblets. Together these weapons gave the Ba.88 impressive armament for its time.

The forward pilot's cockpit was fully instrumented, with an airspeed indicator capable of reading to 560 km/h (350 mph), gyroscope and an altimeter (useful to 8,000 m (26,000 ft).

=== Testing and evaluation ===
Despite its structural weight liabilities, the single-tailed prototype set a speed record over a 100 km (62 mi) circuit on 1 April 1937 by reaching 517.84 km/h (321.77 mph), taking the record away from France. Another record was obtained on 10 April 1937 when it achieved 475 km/h (295 mph) over 1,000 km (620 mi). Piloted by Furio Niclot Doglio, the Ba.88 prototype had two 671 kW (900 hp) Isotta Fraschini K 14 engines. This record speed was increased to 554 km/h (344 mph) when the modified prototype, using a double tail, was re-equipped with the definitive engines; the 746 kW (1,000 hp) Piaggio P.XI-RC40s. This time it broke German records in a 100 km (62 mi) stage at an average speed of 554.4 km/h (344.5 mph) (with 1,000 kg (2,200 lb) load) on 5 December 1937. Finally on 9 December 1937, another world record was set when averaging 524 km/h (326 mph) over 1,000 km (620 mi) with a 1,000 kg (2,200 lb) load.

The Ba.88 had all the design specifications to be a very effective heavy fighter-bomber. It had a slim, streamlined shape (noted by all aviation observers), a rugged structure, heavy firepower, long range and high speed, with the same horsepower of medium bombers such as the Br.20 (but at 9 tonnes/10 tons vs. 5 tonnes/6 tons). Despite its promising beginning, the addition of military equipment in the production series aircraft resulted in high wing loading and detrimental aerodynamic effects with a corresponding loss of performance, below any reasonable level. The contract was subsequently canceled, but production was later resumed, mostly for political reasons to avoid closing production lines of Breda and its satellite company IMAM.

=== Production ===
Production numbers of the first series (production started in 1939) were 81 machines (MM 3962–4042) made by Breda, and 24 by IMAM (MM 4594–4617). The first series included eight trainers, with an elevated second pilot's seat. This was one of the few combat aircraft to have a dedicated trainer version, but it was not enough to prevent the overall failure of the programme.

The second series totalled 19 Breda (4246-4264) and 24 IMAM (MM:5486-5509) machines fitted with small engine cowling rings. There was a limited evolution in this series, with the second series mainly being sent straight to the scrapyard.

== Operational history ==
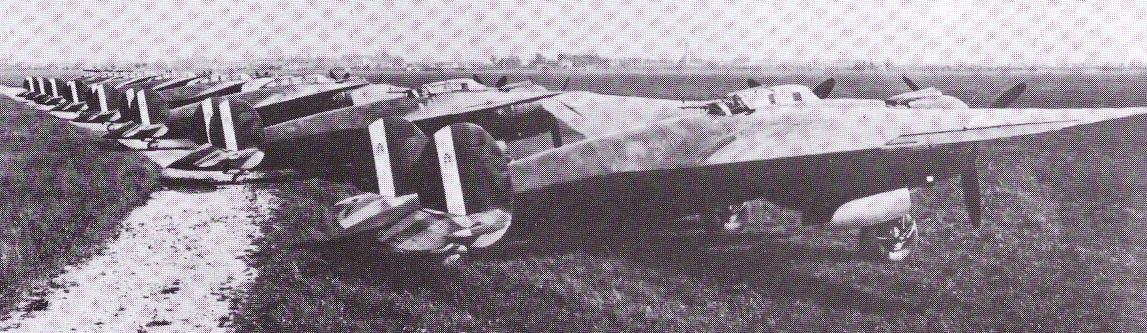
A line-up of Breda Ba.88 aircraft

Two Gruppi (Groups) were equipped with the Breda Ba.88 in June 1940, operating initially from Sardinia against the main airfield of Corsica, with 12 aircraft on 16 June 1940 and three on 19 June 1940. The crews soon found that the Bredas were extremely underpowered and lacked agility, but the lack of fighter opposition resulted in them being able to perform their missions without losses.

Later, 64 aircraft became operational serving 7º Gruppo in the North African Theatre with 19º Gruppo stationed in Sardinia, but their performance remained extremely poor, resulting in 7º Gruppo being grounded from the end of June until September, when the Italian offensive against British forces started. Of three aircraft used, one was not even capable of taking off, and another could not turn and was forced to fly straight from their base at Castelvetrano to Sidi Rezegh.

With anti-sand filters fitted, a maximum level speed of 250 km/h (155 mph) was reported in some cases and several units were even unable to take off at all. These machines were fitted with "Spezzoniera" Nardi dispensers with 119 2 kg (4 lb) bomblets, 1,000 rounds for the three 12.7 mm (0.5 in) machine guns and 500 rounds for the 7.7 mm (0.303 in) Bredas. Although the weapons were not loaded to full capacity and the aircraft was lightened by eliminating the rear machine gun, observer, bombs and some fuel, lessening the weight did not substantially affect the aircraft's performance.

By mid-November, just five months after the start of the war on 10 June 1940, most surviving Ba.88s had been phased out as bombers and stripped of useful equipment, and were scattered around operational airfields as decoys for attacking aircraft. This was a degrading end for the new and theoretically powerful aircraft. It forced the Regia Aeronautica to use totally outdated aircraft in North Africa, such as the Breda Ba.65 and Fiat C.R.32. As an additional problem, the Regia Aereonautica remained without any suitable heavy fighter, a notable weakness for a major air arm.

Similar "heavy fighter-destroyer" projects were developed in several countries. In France, the Breguet Br.690 even with only 1,044 kW (1,400 hp) was more capable than the Ba.88. Despite some problems of reliability, the Br.690 showed a practical usefulness that the Breda never achieved. The Ba.88 was also a contemporary of the Messerschmitt Bf 110, with no great differences in horsepower, weight, power to weight ratio or wingload but the difference in success was immensely in the Bf 110's favour.

Niclot was the only pilot capable of flying this machine at its best and only in the racer version which was much lighter, while the average pilot was not capable of using it effectively. Despite its impressive world records and aggressive, slim shape, the Ba.88 was a failure and unable to undertake combat missions. Its structure was too heavy, wing loading too high, and the engines were quite unreliable with insufficient power. The Piaggio P.XI was quite powerful, but never reliable, leading also to the overall failure of the Reggiane Re.2000. Hungary substituted the engines with similar ones for the first license-produced examples.

At the beginning of 1942, the first modification of the Ba.88s already built was attempted. The aim was to lighten them and transform them into dive bombers. The modification consisted of: reducing them to a single-seater by eliminating the dorsal turret and all related equipment, replacing the P.XIs with Fiat A.74s, removing the lower fuel tank, reducing the front weapons to just two 12.7 mm machine guns, removing the photographic system, opening a new window in the lower part of the nose, installing shutter-type dive brakes, and creating a new bomb attachment system to allow the installation of a single 500 kg bomb in addition to the previously available configurations. Four aircraft were thus modified and were designated Ba. 88 A.74.

Agusta subsequently developed a second modified Ba.88 variant that attracted greater interest. Differences from the previous modified version included: an 80 cm increase in fuselage length, a 2 m increase in wingspan through the addition of wooden wingtips, a frontal armament increased to four 12.7 mm machine guns, a notch in the left wing to increase downward visibility before diving, and provision for the installation of armor for the pilot.

At least 25 aircraft were modified for this purpose. Designated Ba.88M (modificato - modified), these aircraft were delivered mainly to the 1° Nucleo Addestramento Tuffatori, except for two delivered to the 103° Gruppo Autonomo Tuffatori at Lonate Pozzolo, on 7 September 1943, the day before Italian Armistice. Later they were evaluated by Luftwaffe pilots and that was the last heard of the aircraft.

== Variants ==
Ba.88 Lince
The production two-seater ground attack and reconnaissance aircraft. Built in two sub-variants: "gondole grandi" (large nacelles), 97 of which were built, and "gondole ridotte" (reduced nacelles), 43 of which were built.
Ba.88 bicomando
Two-seater dual control training version, featuring a raised cockpit for the instructor and built in 8 units.
Ba.88 A.74
First attempt to modify the existing Ba.88s, modifying them in single-seaters, with only two 12.7 mm machine guns in the nose, replacing the P.XIs with A.74s, and installing dive brakes. 4 aircraft converted.
Ba.88 A.74 Bic
A single dual-control aircraft modified with the replacement of the P.XIs with the A.74s.
Ba.88M
Second modified version, single-seater with wing lengthened by 2 m and fuselage lengthened by 80 cm, also re-engined with Fiat A.74s, with four 12.7 mm machine guns, two placed in the front part of the fuselage and two in the wing roots and dive brakes. At least 25 aircraft modified.

== Operators ==
Kingdom of Italy

- Regia Aeronautica

== Specifications (Ba.88) ==
Data from Aircraft of the Third Reich

General characteristics

- Crew: 2
- Length: 10.60 m (34 ft 9 in)
- Wingspan: 15.6 m (51 ft 2 in)
- Height: 3.0 m (9 ft 10 in)
- Wing area: 33.30 m^{2} (358.4 sq ft)
- Empty weight: 4,650 kg (10,251 lb)
- Max takeoff weight: 6,750 kg (14,881 lb)
- Powerplant: 2 × Piaggio P.XI RC.40 Stella 14-cyl. air-cooled radial piston engines, 746 kW (1,000 hp) each for take-off
- Propellers: 3-bladed variable-pitch propellers

Performance

- Maximum speed: 490 km/h (300 mph, 260 kn) at 4,000 m (13,000 ft)
- Range: 1,640 km (1,020 mi, 890 nmi)
- Service ceiling: 8,000 m (26,000 ft)
- Time to altitude: 3,000 m (9,800 ft) in 7 minutes 30 seconds

Armament

- Guns: 3 × fixed 12.7 mm (0.50 in) Breda-SAFAT machine-guns in the nose + 1 × manually aimed 7.7 mm (0.303 in) Breda-SAFAT machine-gun in the rear cockpit
- Bombs: max. 500 kg (1,102 lb) of bombs semi-recessed in the fuselage belly

== See also ==
Aircraft of comparable role, configuration, and era

- Breguet 693
- Curtiss A-18 Shrike
- Fiat CR.25
- Focke-Wulf Fw 187
- Tupolev SB

Related lists

- List of interwar military aircraft
- List of aircraft of World War II
- List of Regia Aeronautica aircraft used in World War II
