= Tebaldi-Zari =

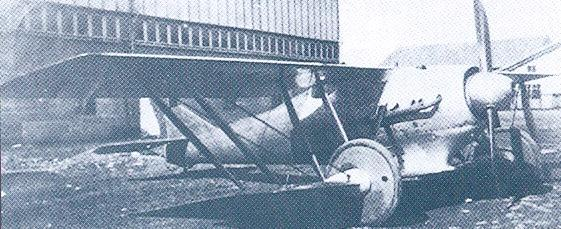
- The Tebaldi-Zari prototype with its lower outer wing panels attached. Breda's redesign of the aircraft allowed them to be removed for testing of the fighter as a sesquiplane.

General information
- Type: Fighter
- National origin: Italy
- Manufacturer: Zari and Società Italiana Ernesto Breda
- Designer: Ing Tebaldi
- Primary user: Italy
- Number built: 1

History
- First flight: 1919

The Tebaldi-Zari was an Italian fighter prototype of 1919. The Breda company later acquired the rights to it.

== Design and development ==
An engineer named Tebaldi designed the Tebaldi-Zari, which was a single-seat wooden sesquiplane with heavily staggered wings and a 142 kW (190 hp) Isotta Fraschini V.6, water-cooled 6-cylinder in-line engine, driving a two-bladed tractor propeller. Its fixed, tailskid landing gear was of very unusual configuration; the main gear was of very wide track and had oversized main wheels with their axle incorporated into the lower wing.

The Zari brothers' factory in Bovisio-Masciago, Milan, manufactured the Tebaldi-Zari prototype in 1919, but Breda soon bought both the prototype and the design rights to the aircraft from Zari. Breda re-engined the prototype with a 224 kW (300 hp) Hispano-Suiza HS-42 V-8 water-cooled engine. In 1922 and drafted an agreement with the Italian government to produce three more aircraft, but no production order followed.

Undaunted, Breda modified the original prototype by arming it with two fixed, forward-firing 7.7 mm (0.303 in) Vickers machine-guns, modifying its upper wing so that it had a longer span and narrower chord, reducing the wing stagger, increasing the gap between the upper wing and fuselage, and increasing the angle of the outer struts so that they attached to the axle of the main wheels allowing the outer wing panels to be removed whenever a desire existed to test the Tebaldi-Zari as a sesquiplane. After these modifications were complete, Breda set about another redesign of the aircraft, this time increasing the size of the ailerons and the chord of the upper wing and removing the outer panels of the lower wing permanently.

Thus modified, the original Tebaldi-Zari prototype was entered in the Italian 1923 fighter contest. The Regia Aeronautica (Italian Royal Air Force) took no interest in a production order, and no further aircraft were built.

== Operators ==
Kingdom of Italy

== Specifications (with HS-42 engine) ==
Data from The Complete book of fighters

General characteristics

- Crew: 1
- Length: 7.8 m (25 ft 7 in)
- Wingspan: 9 m (29 ft 6 in)
- Height: 2 m (6 ft 7 in)
- Wing area: 22 m^{2} (240 sq ft)
- Empty weight: 825 kg (1,819 lb)
- Gross weight: 1,100 kg (2,425 lb)
- Powerplant: 1 × Hispano-Suiza HS-42 V-8 water-cooled piston engine, 220 kW (300 hp)
- Propellers: 2-bladed fixed pitch propeller

Performance

- Maximum speed: 255 km/h (158 mph, 138 kn) at 2,000 m (6,600 ft)
- Endurance: 3 hours
- Time to altitude: 5,000 m (16,000 ft) in 16 minutes

Armament

- Guns: 2 × fixed forward-firing 7.7 mm (0.303 in) machine-guns

== See also ==
- Società Italiana Ernesto Breda
