= FS Class D.345 =

Type of locomotive

Class D.345
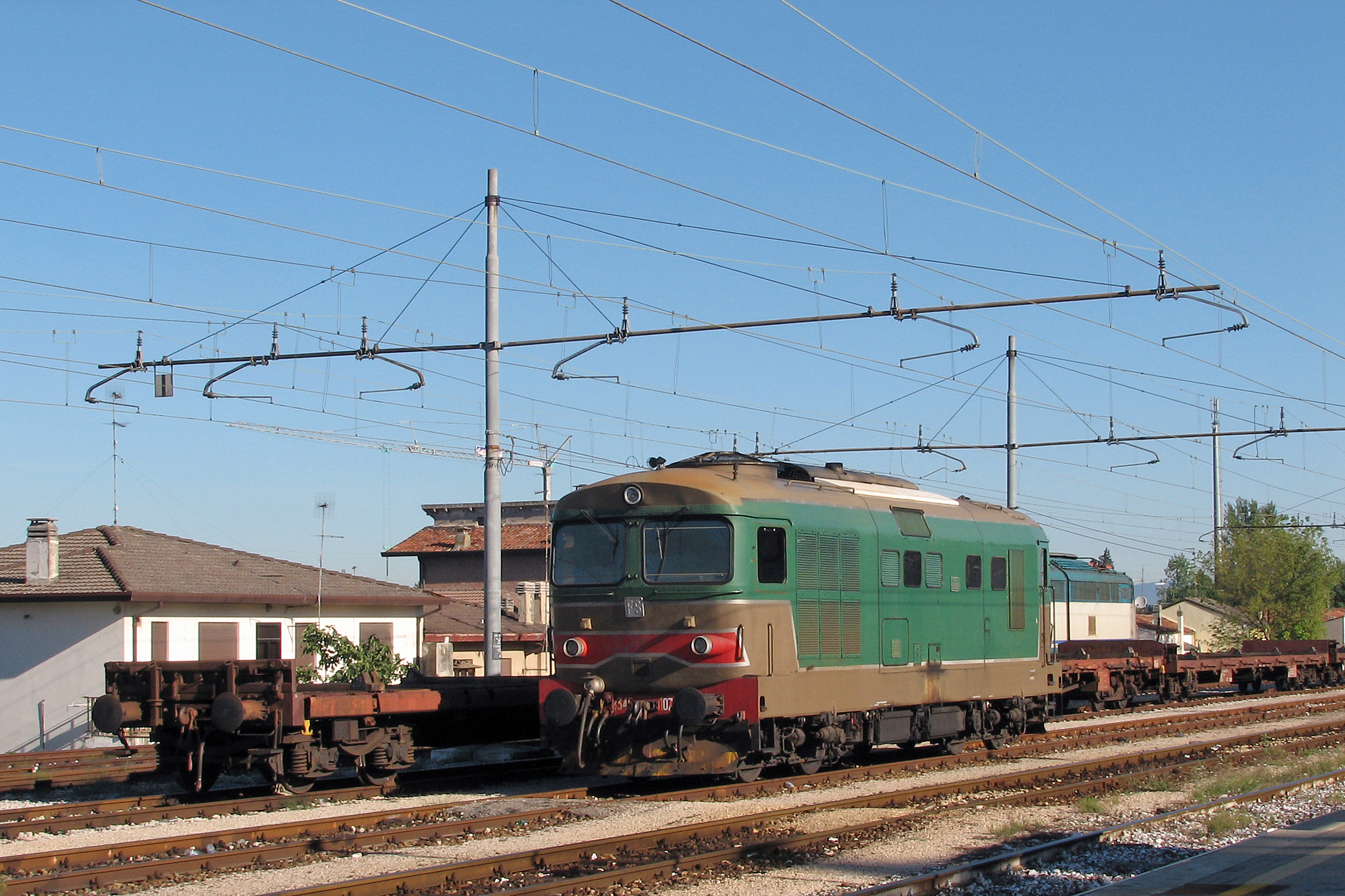
- D.345 locomotive in the original livery.
Type and origin
- Power type: Diesel
- Builder: FIAT Grandi Motori, Breda, SOFER
- Build date: 1970-1979
- Total produced: 145
Specifications
- Configuration
  - UIC: Bo′Bo′
- Gauge: 1,435 mm (4 ft 8 1/2 in) standard gauge
- Length: 13.24 m (43 ft 5 1/4 in)
- Width: 3.00 m (9 ft 10 1/8 in)
- Height: 4.25 m (13 ft 11 3/8 in)
- Loco weight: 62 t (61 long tons; 68 short tons)
- Fuel type: Diesel
- Transmission: Electric
Performance figures
- Maximum speed: 130 km/h (81 mph)
- Power output: 750 kW (1,010 hp)
Career
- Operators: FS/Trenitalia and others
- Disposition: in service

The FS Class D.345 is a class of diesel-electric locomotive used in Italy, introduced in the 1970s and still in service.

== History ==
After the positive experience with class D.343, in 1970, Italian state railways, Ferrovie dello Stato, ordered further 70 diesel locomotives with some minor improvements. The FIAT engine was confirmed, while the Breda-engine was to be abandoned and a new, more reliable cooling system was fitted. The locomotives were manufactured by FIAT, Breda and SOFER, with electrical equipment provided by Magneti Marelli, TIBB and Italtrafo. The last unit was delivered in 1979.

== Description ==
The D.345's structure is very similar to that of D.343. The central compartment, housing the engine, the generator and the cooling system, is missing the baggage room, which had been never used in the previous class. The engine is a 4+4 V cylinder FIAT 218SSF with direct fuel injection, with a power output of 1,350 HP at 1500 rpm.

The electric generator is a DC one produced by Tecnomasio Italiano Brown Boveri (TIBB), with a power of 750 kW (1,010 hp). The electric motors, one for each bogie, were produced by Ansaldo.

The command circuit includes electro-pneumatic switches and relays, located in a large cabin in the front cab. D345 also introduced a static regulation with field-weakening (shunting) of the traction motors, which is divided in five levels that are automatically inserted (one at a time on each motor) when the throttle controller (which looks like a steering wheel and has 13 positions) is in any notch between 10 and 13.
