= FS Class ETR 200 =

Electric multiple unit

ETR 200
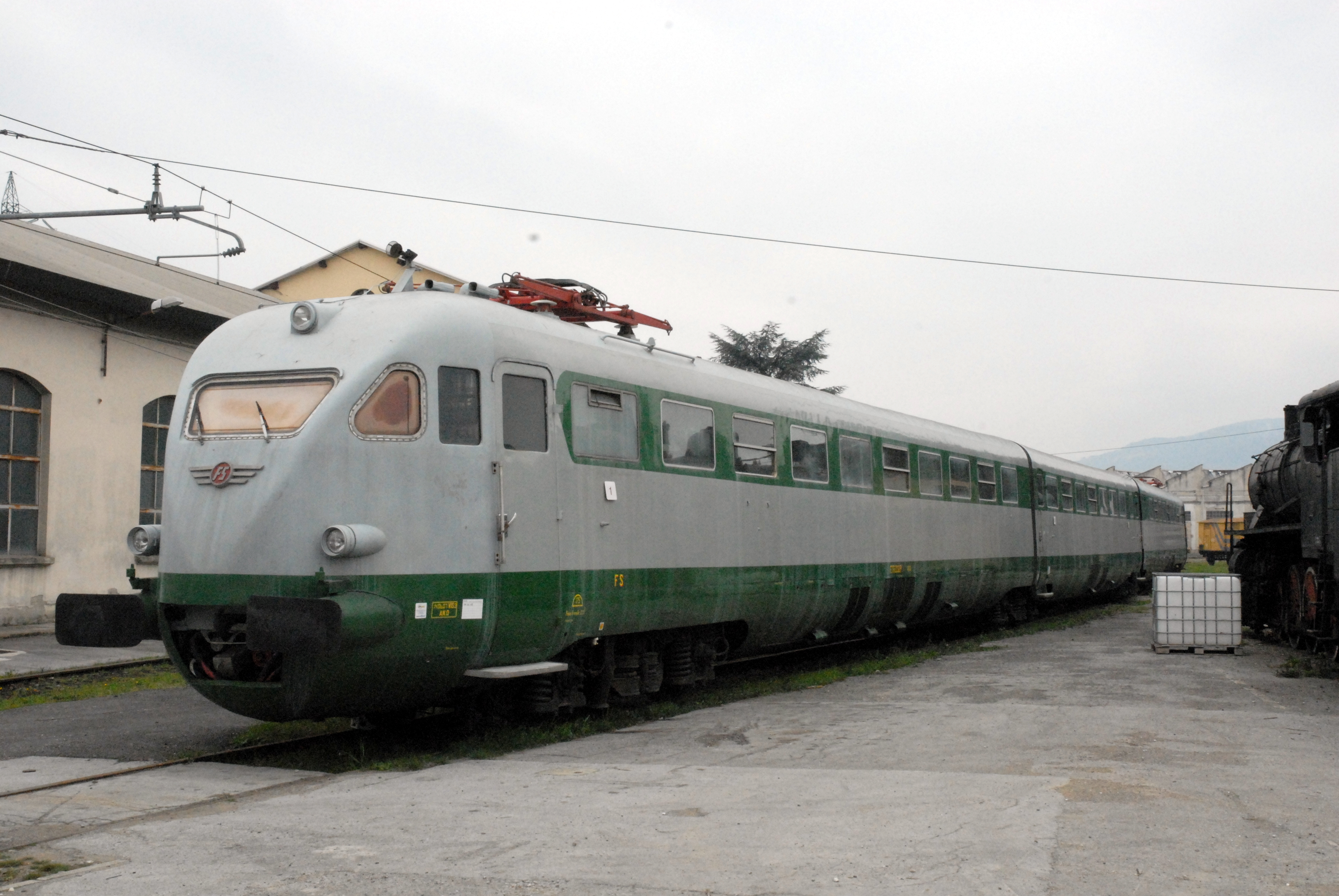
- The original trainset of the speed world record (203 km/h (126 mph)) in 1938, now preserved as historical train, was re-numbered ETR 232 in the 1960s
- In service: 1937–1997 (as ETR 220)
- Manufacturer: Società Italiana Ernesto Breda
- Refurbished: 1960, rebuilt to ETR 220
- Number built: 18 trainsets
- Formation: Three-car trainset
- Capacity: ETR 201-206: 35 1st class, 69 2nd class ETR 207-218: 100 1st class
- Operator: Ferrovie dello Stato

Specifications
- Train length: 62.8 m (206 ft 1/2 in)
- Maximum speed: 160 km/h (100 mph)
- Weight: 116.8 t (115.0 long tons; 128.7 short tons)
- Power output: 1,050 kW (1,408 hp)
- Electric system: 3000 V DC catenary
- Current collection: Pantograph
- Track gauge: 1,435 mm (4 ft 8 1/2 in) standard gauge

The ETR 200 (for "Elettro Treno Rapido 200", in Italian meaning "Rapid Electric Train series 200") is an Italian electric multiple unit (EMU) introduced in 1936 and withdrawn from revenue service in 1997. They are considered the first high-speed trains by some railway historians.

On 20 July 1939 the ETR 200 unit 212 obtained the railway speed record, between Bologna and Milan.

== Development and records ==
In the 1930s, the Italian state railways, Ferrovie dello Stato, electrified the main line Milan-Bologna-Florence-Rome-Naples and needed a fast train to use on it and on other newly electrified ones. The project was started in 1934, using new technologies for steel and aerodynamics. The innovative nose of the train was developed after studies in the wind tunnel at the Politecnico di Torino engineering university.

The first example was built by Società Italiana Ernesto Breda, (now AnsaldoBreda), in 1936, an articulated and traction-distributed train with three cars on four bogies, two of which were Jacobs bogies, had a single T 62-R-100 motor, while the others—at the front and rear—were provided with two similar motors each.

They were equipped with air conditioning and had only first-class seats.

The train had been designed for speeds up to 175 km/h (109 mph), but the first pantographs caused problems over 130 km/h (81 mph). The ETR 200 entered service in 1937 on the Bologna-Rome-Naples line. They were considered the most comfortable and fast trains in Europe, and Benito Mussolini had one sent to 1939 New York World's Fair. On 6 December 1937 the ETR 201 (Note: The numbering of FS high speed trainsets is historically different from the "standard" trainset codification, and is composed by a first number, identifying the group, plus a progressive 2-digit number identifying the unit. For example, 212 is the 12th unit of group 200. Later, the group was upgraded to group 220/230/240, and unit 212 became 232) reached a top speed of 201 km/h (125 mph) on the Rome-Naples line (between the stations of Campoleone and Nettunia).

On 20 July 1939, the ETR 212, driven by driver Alessandro Cervellati, established a new world record running (on the average speed for the whole run) between Florence and Milan at 165 km/h (103 mph), and also improving the absolute top speed record up to 203 km/h (126 mph) in the stretch from Pontenure to Piacenza. A popular myth held that Benito Mussolini himself was at the controls, but this does not hold to historical evidence.

== Later history ==
The production of the ETR 200 was halted by World War II. In 1940 they were withdrawn from service due to wartime exgencies; some were damaged by Allied bombing raids. The surviving units re-entered service between 1946 and 1952.

In the early 1960s, the remaining sixteen units were converted to ETR 220/230/240 by adding a fourth car and making other improvements. They remained in service until the early 1980s, and were later used for charter trains until the 1990s.

The ETR 232, formerly 212 (the unit making the 1939 record run), has been preserved as a historical train and is in full working order, having undergone a full refit in 2025. Another non-working unit was first stored in Ancona until its scrapping in September 2012.

== See also ==
- High-speed rail in Italy
- Land speed record for railed vehicles
- Treno Alta Velocità
