= Società Italiana Ernesto Breda =

Locomotive, machinery, aircraft, and armaments manufacturer

- Industry: Engineering
- Founded: 1886; 140 years ago
- Defunct: 2001; 25 years ago
- Fate: merged with Gio. Ansaldo & C. to form AnsaldoBreda
- Successor: AnsaldoBreda; BredaMenarinibus
- Headquarters: Milan, Italy
- Products: Transport aircraft Bombers; Experimental planes Air force trainers Seaplanes; Ships; Locomotives
- Subsidiaries: Breda Meccanica Bresciana; IMAM

Società Italiana Ernesto Breda (lit. 'Ernesto Breda Italian Society'), more usually referred to simply as Breda, was an Italian mechanical manufacturing company founded by Ernesto Breda in Milan in 1886.

== History ==
The firm was founded by Ernesto Breda in Milan in 1886. It originally manufactured locomotives and other railway machinery, but later branched out into armaments and aircraft. Occasionally, not continuously, the company also built trolleybuses. In 1935, it acquired the railway division of Officine Ferroviarie Meridionali and, soon afterwards, the aircraft division of the same company.

Breda-designed machine guns such as the Breda Model 30 and Breda Model 37 were standard issue weapons for the Royal Italian Army during the Second Italo-Abyssinian War, the Italian Invasion of Albania and World War 2. At the peak of its wartime production, the company had 26,000 employees. By 1954, its workforce had been reduced to around 8,000.

In 1962, Breda was nationalised as part of EFIM, but was liquidated in the 1990s. The train and tram manufacturing division fused with Ansaldo to form AnsaldoBreda, the armaments division became an independent entity as Breda Meccanica Bresciana, as did the research division as Istituto Scientifico Breda.

== Products ==
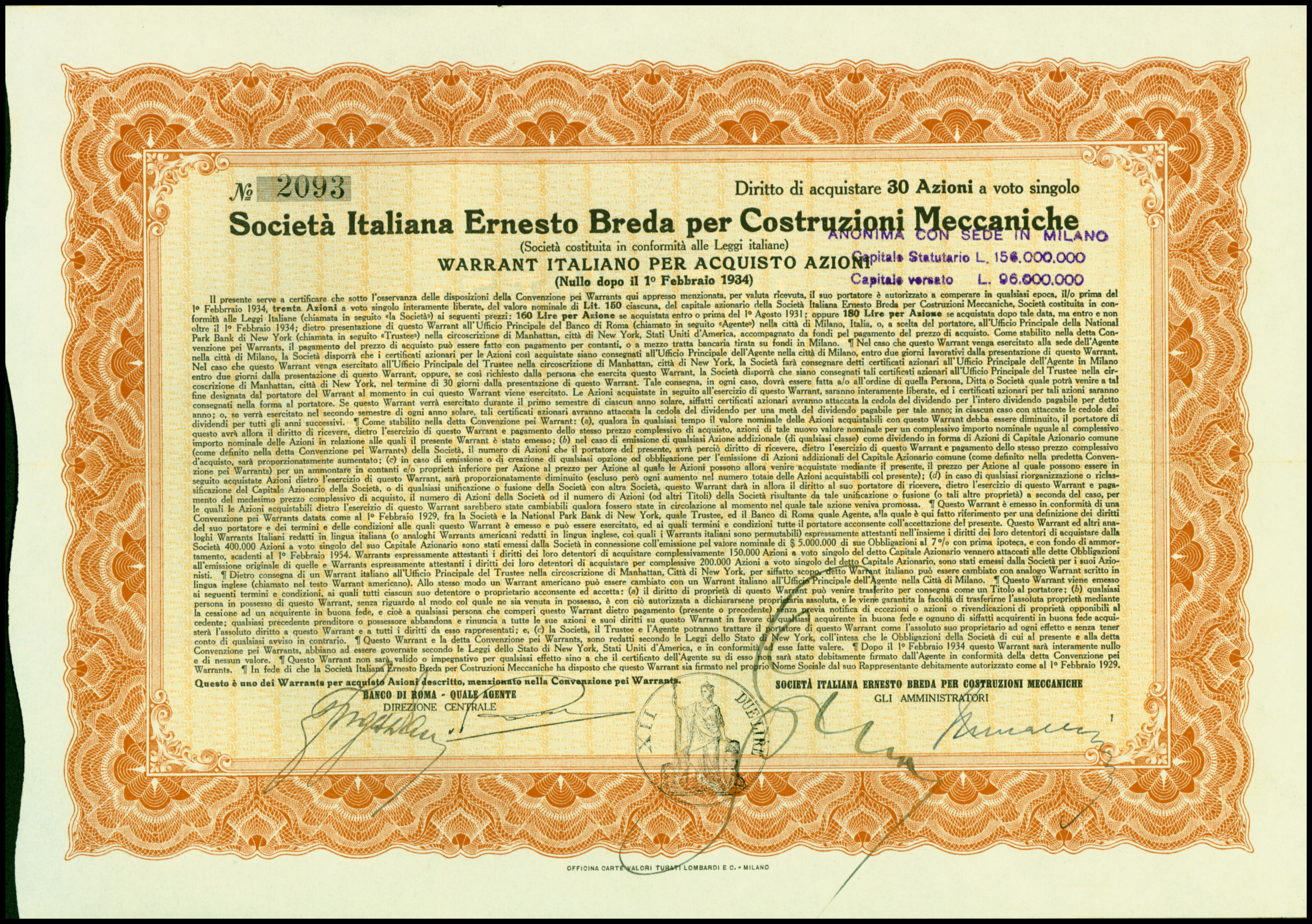
Warrant of the Società Italiana Ernesto Breda per Costruzioni Meccaniche, issued 1st February 1929

=== Aircraft products ===
- A.2
- A.4
- A.7
- A.8
- A.9
- A.10
- A.14
- Ba.15
- Ba.19
- CC.20
- Ba.25
- Ba.26
- Ba.27
- Ba.28
- Ba.32
- Ba.33
- Ba.39
- Ba.42
- Ba.44
- Ba.46
- Ba.64
- Ba.65
- Ba.75
- Ba.79S
- Ba.82
- Ba.88
- Ba.92
- Ba.201
- Ba.205
- BP.471
- BZ.308
- BZ.309
- Tebaldi-Zari

=== Rolling stock products ===
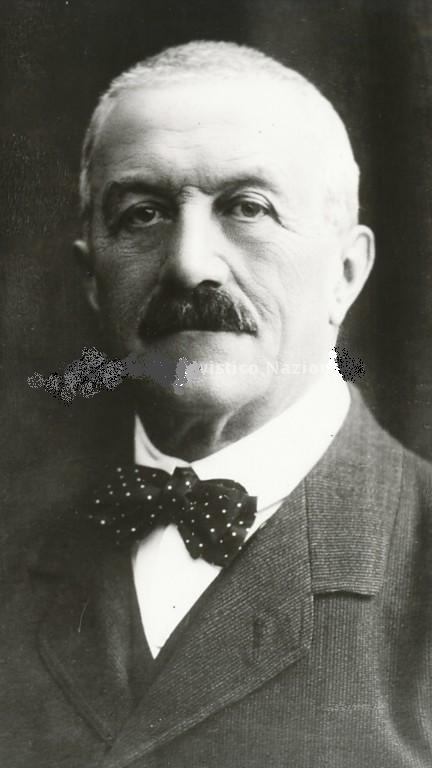
Ernesto Breda, c. 1920

==== Locomotives ====
- South African Class 15CA 4-8-2
- SEK class Μα
- E.330
- D.341
- D.345
- D.443
- E.424
- E.428
- E.636
- HŽ series 1061

==== DMU and EMU ====
- ETR 200
- ETR 240
- ETR 300
- FNM Class E.750

==== Metro ====
- Washington Metro 2000-Series, 3000-Series, 4000-series
- Breda A650

==== Tram and light rail ====
- ATM Class 1500
- ATM Class 4600 and 4700
- LRVs for RTA Rapid Transit (Cleveland)
- MBTA Green Line Type 8 (production continued after merger)
- LRV2 and LRV3 for Muni Metro (San Francisco)

=== Trolleybuses ===
The production of trolleybuses was a small part of Breda's output, carried out through its subsidiary Breda Costruzioni Ferroviarie (it), and was not under way continuously. Between 1936 and 1940, the company built a total of 28 trolleybuses, most for the Rome system but including six for Genoa. At various times between 1938 and 1956, more trolleybuses were built, but totalling only 16. Production resumed in 1988. Almost all of Breda's customers for trolleybuses were Italian trolleybus systems, but a notable exception was an order of 236 dual-mode buses that Breda built for the Downtown Seattle Transit Tunnel between 1988 and 1991.

== See also ==
- Leonardo S.p.A.
