= Breda Ba.65 =

Italian ground-attack aircraft in World War II

Ba.65
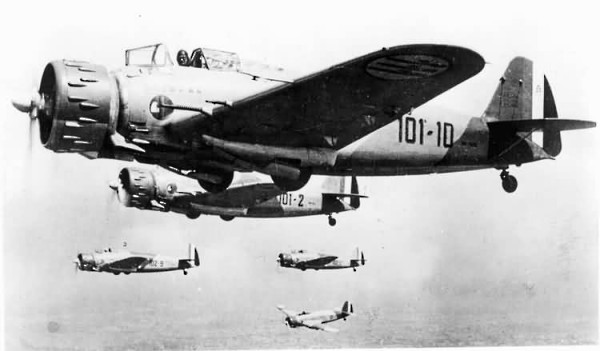
- Italian Breda 65 K.14.

General information
- Type: Ground attack aircraft
- Manufacturer: Breda
- Primary users: Regia Aeronautica Iraq; Chile; Portugal
- Number built: 218

History
- Manufactured: 1935–1939
- First flight: September 1935
- In service: 1937-1941 (Italy) -1946 (Chile)

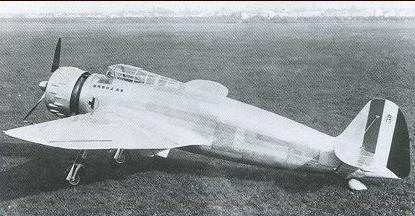
Breda Ba.65 K.14 prototype (MM.325) on the ground

The Breda Ba.65 was an Italian all-metal single-engine, low-wing monoplane that was used by Aviazione Legionaria during the Spanish Civil War and Regia Aeronautica in the first half of World War II. It was the only Italian ground-attack aircraft that saw active service in this role. It saw service almost exclusively in the North African and Middle-Eastern theatre. In addition to more than 150 aircraft operated by the Italian forces, a total of 55 were exported and used by the air forces of Iraq, Chile and Portugal.

== Design and development ==
An evolution of Ba.64, the Ba.65 was designed by Antonio Parano and Giuseppe Panzeri. It was a single-seat, all-metal, low-wing cantilever monoplane with aft-retracting main undercarriage. Like its predecessor, it was intended to undertake aeroplano da combattimento multiple roles as a fighter, attack and reconnaissance aircraft. The Ba.65 carried wing-mounted armament of two 12.7 mm (0.5 in) and two 7.7 mm (0.303 in) Breda-SAFAT machine guns, with internal stowage for a 400 kg (440 lb) bombload. The prototype, which was first flown in September 1935, like the initial production aircraft, used the 522 kW (700 hp) Gnôme-Rhône K-14 radial engine produced under license by Isotta Fraschini. Starting from the 82nd aircraft, the more powerful Fiat A.80 RC.41 18-cylinder, twin-row radial engine with a takeoff rating of 746 kW (1,000 hp) was adopted. Production ceased in July 1939 after 218 aircraft were built by Breda and Caproni.

== Operational history ==
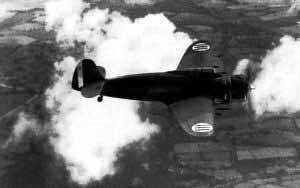
Breda Ba.65

The first deployment of the Ba.65 was during the Spanish Civil War. Thirteen Series I aircraft, powered by the Gnôme-Rhône engine, equipped the 65a Squadriglia of the Aviazione Legionaria (Legionary Air Force). The unit made its combat debut in operations over the Santander front in August 1937. On 24 August, in a unique engagement, a pilot of a Ba.65 on patrol over the unit's base at Soria encountered a lone Republican Tupolev SB bomber over Soria and shot it down. In December 1937 – February 1938, the unit took part in the Battle of Teruel, being heavily deployed in operations against the Republican offensive and supporting the subsequent Nationalist counter-offensive, and during March–April 1938 took part in the Aragon Offensive. From June 1938, the Breda 65s added dive bombing attacks to their tasks, and from July, the squadron took part in the Battle of the Ebro, receiving reinforcements from new Fiat-powered Ba.65s from August. Of the 23 Ba.65s sent to Spain, 12 were lost in the course of the civil war. They flew 1,921 sorties, including 368 ground-strafing and 59 dive bombing attacks. When the Aviazione Legionaria returned to Italy in May 1939, they transferred their 11 surviving Ba.65s to the Spanish Air Force. Shortages of spare parts meant that the Spanish Bredas saw little use, with no unit completely equipped with the type, and they were gradually cannibalized for spare parts before being sold for scrap. None survived until 1945.

A total of 15 Fiat-powered Ba.65s two-seaters were sold to the Kingdom of Iraq in 1938. These consisted of 12 equipped with Breda M turrets and two dual control trainers. From 2–31 May 1941, the Royal Iraqi Air Force flew the Ba.65 during the Anglo-Iraqi War. War broke out after an Iraqi coup d'état installed a new government while maintaining the existing monarchy. The Ba.65 was used against armed forces of the United Kingdom and the Commonwealth of Nations which the coup leaders were trying to expel from bases established after Iraq's independence under the Anglo-Iraqi Treaty of 1930.

During World War II, the Ba.65 was employed against the British in North Africa. When Italy entered the war in June 1940 about 150 aircraft were reported to be still in service, but suffered heavy losses facing the British fighters. Most were either out of service or shot down by early 1942. The aircraft, which had been forcibly kept in service after the failure of the Ba.88 and the poor performance of the Caproni Ca.310, was replaced in the dive bomber role by Ju.87 Stuka purchased by Italy in 1940 or modified fighters. Despite having been destined for scrap at the beginning of hostilities and pulled back into action, the Bredas of 50 Stormo fought a bitter and courageous battle from 13 June 1940 to the remainder of the year. The Bredas proved to be deadly and precise in the role of low level ground attack and dive bombing in comparison with other aircraft available. In the hands of pilots like Capt. Antonio dell'Oro, Tenente Adriano Visconti and Spanish civil war veteran pilots who were properly trained to fly the aircraft it proved a bitter pill for British armoured forces caught in the desert. Notable encounters included missions carried out at Sidi Rezegh and Sidi Barrani. The Bredas were even involved in one air battle causing the loss of 3 Gloster Gladiators.

In September 1937, Chile ordered 20 Ba.65s, three of which were dual controls trainers. The Chilean aircraft differed from standard Italian aircraft by being powered by the Piaggio P.XI C.40 (also a 14K derivative) engine, a different housing for the landing gear and the use of 7mm Madsen machine guns and 12.7 mm Madsen heavy machine guns instead of the Breda SAFAT machine guns fitted to Italian aircraft. Twenty Breda dorsal turrets were ordered with the aircraft, but these were rarely fitted owing to their weight. The Chilean aircraft were delivered from late 1938 to early 1939, but suffered several accidents in the first few months of operation and the type was grounded in November 1939. Subsequent investigations found a number of problems with the aircraft. Its manoeuvrability was poor, meaning that it was not suitable for use as a fighter, while range was short and the aircraft required very long runways for safe operation. Limited flying restarted in November 1940, but in October 1941, a further study concluded that the aircraft had no value as a combat aircraft and should only be used as an unarmed trainer. They flew for the last time in February 1943, and were withdrawn from service and scrapped in 1944. Portugal purchased 10 Breda equipped with Fiat engines, leading-edge slots placed differently and Breda M Turrets in November 1939. On 15 February 1941, a hangar at Sintra Air Base that was used to house the Bredas was badly damaged in a storm, as were the aircraft within. Attempts to repair the Bredas failed, and they were scrapped. The Breda Ba.65 was selected for licence production for the Chinese Nationalist Air Force, with 30 aircraft, powered by Pratt & Whitney Twin Wasp engines, to be built at the Sino-Italian National Aircraft Works (SINAW) (a joint venture between Italy and China) at Nanchang. The production plans were abandoned in December 1937 after the Italian technical personnel were pulled out of China. In September 1937, the Swiss Air Force tested the Ba.65 alongside the Heinkel He 112 and the Morane-Saulnier M.S.406 but ended up selecting the Morane.

== Variants ==
- Ba.65 K.14: Single-seat version with Isotta Fraschini K.14 fc engine, two 12.7 mm Breda SAFAT machine guns and two 7.7 mm machine guns.
- Ba.65 K.14 M: Two-seat version with 12.7 mm Breda M defensive turret.
- Ba.65 K.14 L: Two-seat version with 7.7 mm Breda L defensive turret.
- Ba.65 K.14 d.c.: Doppio Comando (Dual Control) unarmed trainer variant.
- Ba.65 A.80: Single-seat version with Fiat A.80 R.C. 41 engine.
- Ba.65 A.80 L: Two-seat version with Fiat A.80 engine and 7.7 mm Breda L defensive turret.
- Ba.65 A.80 M: Export version used by Iraq and Portugal, with Fiat A.80 engine and 12.7 mm Breda M defensive turret. The Portuguese ones differ from the Iraqi ones by the positioning of the leading-edge slots.
- Ba.65 P.XI: Export version used by Chile, with Piaggio P.XI engine, a different housing for the landing gear and Madsen machine guns, eventually equipped with Breda M defensive turret.
- Ba.65 P&W R-1830: Export version proposed to China, equipped with P&W Twin Wasp engine.
- Ba.65M: Modificato (Modified) dive bombing training version, conversion of 40 aircraft carried out by Caproni Vizzola with: the installation of dive brakes, the installation of underwing hardpoint for 2 x 15 kg practice bombs, the removal of all previous bombs installations in the fuselage and all the machine guns except one 7.7 mm machine gun in the right wing.

== Operators ==
Kingdom of Italy

- Regia Aeronautica
- Aviazione Legionaria

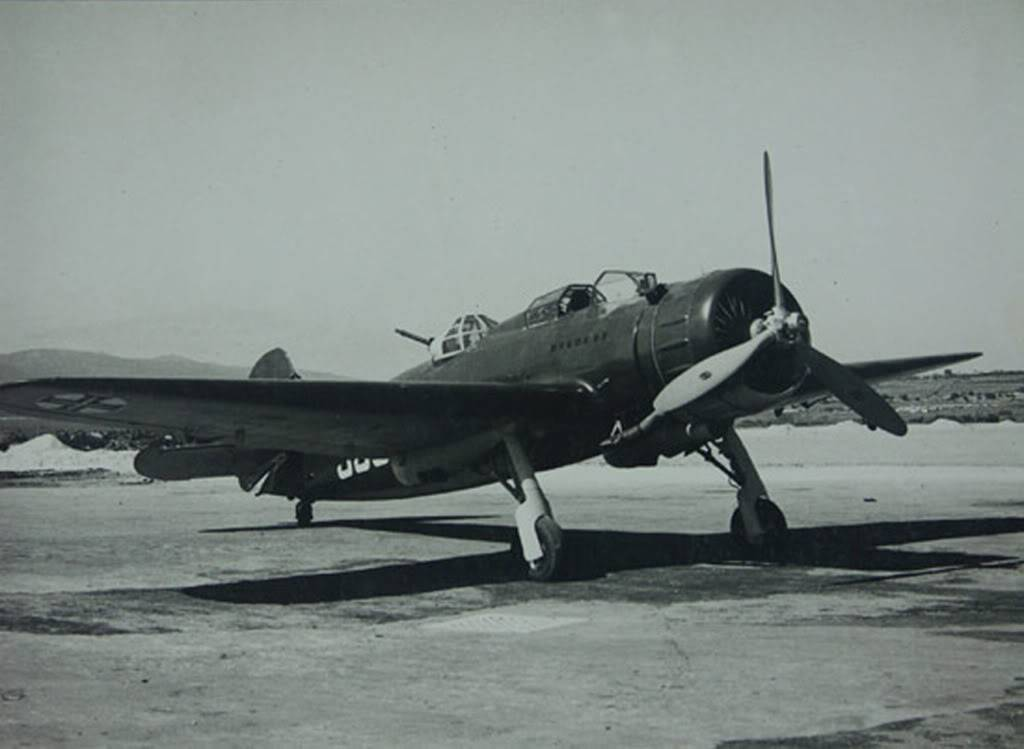
Breda Ba.65 A.80 M purchased by Portugal

Iraq

- Royal Iraqi Air Force

Chile

- Chilean Air Force

Portugal

- Portuguese Air Force

Spanish State

- Spanish Air Force

== Specifications (single-seat version) ==
Data from The Encyclopedia of Weapons of World War II

General characteristics

- Crew: 1
- Length: 9.3 m (30 ft 6 in)
- Wingspan: 12 m (39 ft 4 in)
- Height: 3 m (9 ft 10 in)
- Wing area: 23.5 m^{2} (253 sq ft)
- Empty weight: 2,500 kg (5,512 lb)
- Max takeoff weight: 3,150 kg (6,945 lb)
- Powerplant: 1 × Fiat A.80 R.C.41 18-cylinder twin-row air-cooled radial piston engine, 746 kW (1,000 hp)
- Propellers: 3-bladed variable-pitch propeller

Performance

- Maximum speed: 430 km/h (270 mph, 230 kn)
- Range: 550 km (340 mi, 300 nmi)
- Service ceiling: 7,450 m (24,440 ft)

Armament

- Guns:

- 2 × 12.7 mm (0.500 in) Breda-SAFAT machine guns
- 2 × 7.7 mm (0.303 in) Breda-SAFAT machine guns

- Bombs:

- 400 kg (882 lb) of bombs

== See also ==
Aircraft of comparable role, configuration, and era

- Aichi D3A
- Blackburn Skua
- Curtiss SB2C Helldiver
- Douglas SBD Dauntless
- Junkers Ju 87 Stuka
- Loire-Nieuport LN.401
- Vultee A-31 Vengeance

Related lists

- List of aircraft of World War II
- List of attack aircraft
- List of interwar military aircraft
- List of Regia Aeronautica aircraft used in World War II
