= Breda-SAFAT machine gun =

Breda Mod. SAFAT cal. 7,7 Breda Mod. SAFAT cal. 12,7
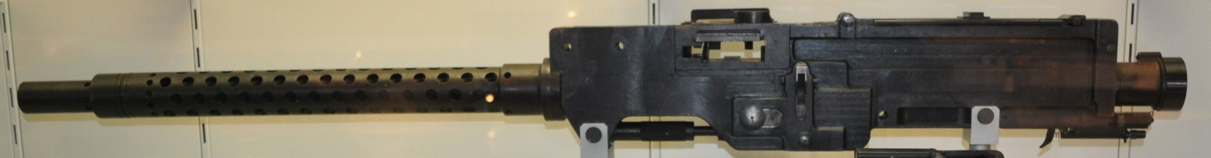
- A 12.7 mm (0.500 in) Breda-SAFAT machine gun on display at the Steven F. Udvar-Hazy Center
- Type: Machine-gun
- Place of origin: Italy

Service history
- In service: Since 1928 to 1970s
- Used by: Regia Aeronautica; Royal Hungarian Air Force; Royal Iraqi Air Force; Swedish Air Force; Finnish Air Force; Imperial Japanese Army Air Service; Aviación Nacional; Royal Yugoslav Air Force; Syrian Army
- Wars: Spanish Civil War; Second Sino-Japanese War; World War II; Six Day War

Production history
- Designer: Giuseppe Mascarucci
- Designed: 1927
- Manufacturer: SAFAT from 1928 to 1930; Breda since 1930

Specifications
- Mass: 12 kg (26 lb) (7.7 mm); 28.9 kg (64 lb) (12.7 mm)
- Length: 108.5 cm (42.7 in) (7.7 mm); 138.5 cm (54.5 in) (12.7 mm)
- Barrel length: 66 cm (26 in) (7.7 mm); 80 cm (31 in) (12.7 mm)
- Cartridge: 7.7x56mmR light, 12.7x81mmSR heavy
- Caliber: 7.7 mm (0.303 in); 12.7 mm (0.50 in)
- Barrels: 1
- Action: Short recoil
- Rate of fire: 900 rounds/min (7.7 mm); 700 rounds/min (575 rounds/min synchronized) (12.7 mm)
- Muzzle velocity: 730 metres per second (2,400 ft/s) (7.7 mm); 760 metres per second (2,500 ft/s) (12.7 mm)
- Feed system: Belt-fed

Breda Mod. SAFAT cal. 7,7 and Breda Mod. SAFAT cal. 12,7, also known as Breda Mod. SAFAT 7.7 and Breda Mod. SAFAT 12.7, 7.7mm Breda-SAFAT and 12.7mm Breda-SAFAT, or more commonly as Breda-SAFAT 7.7 and Breda-SAFAT 12.7 were two Italian machine guns designed for aircraft use. Designed by Giuseppe Mascarucci, the guns were chambered to fire the standard ammunition in service with the Regia Aeronautica: 7.7 mm (0.303 in) and 12.7 mm (0.500 in) calibres, predominantly ball, tracer for the 7.7mm, including high explosive incendiary tracer (HEI-T) (filled with 0.8 grams of PETN), or armour-piercing (AP) for the 12.7mm.

== Design and development ==
During the late 1920s both Breda and SAFAT (a division of FIAT) were given the task of producing designs for a new light machine gun for use in aircraft of the Regia Aeronautica, the offering from SAFAT being preferred with the FIAT mod.1928 Avio cal. 7,7. But in the same years FIAT lost the competition for the light machine gun for the Italian Army resulting in the closing of SAFAT and the selling of its patents to Breda.

With the closure of SAFAT and the sale of the patents, Breda, despite having lost the competition for the aeronautical machine gun, found itself the manufacturer of the former competitor's weapon.

So the original name Mitragliatrice FIAT Mod.1928 Avio cal. 7,7 was changed in Mitragliatrice Breda - Mod. SAFAT cal. 7,7 (Breda Machine gun - Model SAFAT, caliber 7,7 mm), or, more simply, Breda Mod. SAFAT cal. 7,7. During production, various improvements were made, creating four different sub-variants of the 7.7 caliber weapon.

Since 1931-1932 the Regia Aeronautica asked for an heavy machine gun, the Breda response was simply an enlargement of the previous 7,7 mm caliber gun, now chambered in 12,7x81mmSR.

Despite the aim of producing an airborne machine-gun equal or superior to other similar weapons, the use of low propellant capacity rounds resulted in significantly lower muzzle velocities than other weapons of similar calibres. Other inadequacies included high weight and modest rates of fire as well as the ineffectiveness of the High Explosive-Incendiary-Tracer round.

However, despite these shortcomings, the Breda-SAFAT gun was generally praised by the Italian pilots and armourers: the pilots because of its long range and apparent good hitting power, the armourers because of its reliability.

Thus, Italy lacked machine-guns with the critical qualities of light weight, a high rate of fire, good muzzle velocity, good projectile weight and reliability, while the Soviets, Germans, Americans and Japanese had 12.7 mm calibre automatic ordnance in the Berezin UB, MG 131, Browning M2, and Ho-103 respectively. Late-war Italian aircraft began to adopt the "original" calibre German Mauser 20 mm (0.787 in) MG 151 cannon to give their aircraft parity in firepower with Allied fighters, with as many as three MG 151 fitted to Macchi MC.205, Fiat G.55 and Reggiane Re.2005—the third cannon firing through the propeller hub of the licence-built Daimler-Benz DB 605 engines (Fiat Tifone) inline inverted V12 engines used to power these aircraft—in addition to synchronized cowl-mounted 12.7mm Bredas-SAFATs.

The Breda guns, although adequate in the early '30s at the time of their design, were out-classed by the standards of 1940, with Italian fighters such as the Fiat C.R.42, Fiat G.50 Freccia, Macchi MC.200, Macchi MC.202 and Reggiane Re.2000 still only having two 12.7 mm Breda-SAFAT machine-guns and sometimes two extra 7.7 mm Breda-SAFAT machine-guns. Despite their shortcomings, thousands of Breda guns were built in the 1930s and 1940s, arming nearly every Italian fighter and bomber of that period. Many of these weapons were also adapted for the anti-aircraft role and remained in service until the 1970s as reserve weapons; even if all the aircraft that they equipped had been phased out by that time.

== Applications ==
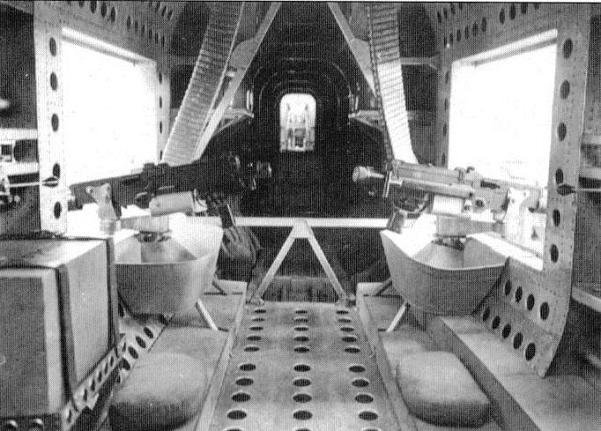
7.7mm Breda-SAFAT machine-guns in the waist gun positions of a FIAT R.S.14

=== Fighters ===
- Fiat CR.32
- Fiat CR.42
- Fiat G.50 Freccia
- Fiat G.55
- Fiat G.59
- Macchi C.200
- Macchi C.202
- Macchi C.205
- Reggiane Re.2000
- Reggiane Re.2002
- Reggiane Re.2005

=== Bombers ===
- Caproni Ca.133
- Caproni Ca.309
- Caproni Ca.310
- Fiat BR.20
- Piaggio P.108
- Savoia-Marchetti SM.79

=== Ground-attack ===
- Breda Ba.64
- Breda Ba.65
- Breda Ba.88 Lince
- CANSA FC.20
