= List of Italian gliders =

This is a list of gliders/sailplanes of the world, (this reference lists all gliders with references, where available) Note: Any aircraft can glide for a short time, but gliders are designed to glide for longer.

== Italian miscellaneous constructors ==
- Abate GP-1 – ABATE, U.
- AER Pegaso M 100S
- Aeromere M-100
- Alfieri AT-1 Alcyone – A.Alfieri
- ASUP 1924 glider
- Avia LM-02
- Bagalini Bagaliante
- Bertelli Aerostave 1905 Italie BERTELLI, Achille
- Borghese 1931 hydroglider
- Bottini Mabo
- Bruni 3V-1 Eolo
- Busso San Giorgio
- Cambilargiu Goliardia - Emanuele Cambilargiu
- Caproni Vizzola Calif
- CPV-1 Arlecchino – Centro Politecnico del Volo
- Danieli Piuma
- Ditta Movo F.M.1 Passero – Frati designed
- Febo Paglierini – Fabris
- Frati BF-46 – Stelio Frati – Aeroclub de Busto Arsizio, Varese
- Glasfaser Velino – Glasfaser Italiana SpA
- IMAM Ro-35
- Lombardi AL-12P – Aeronautica Lombardi
- Macetti Aeronautilo – A.M. Macetti
- Meteor MS-30 L-Passero
- Pagliani Vittoria – Pagiani, Armando
- Piernifero
- Posniak propulsione umana – Posniak, B, – man-powered aircraft
- Raciti Grifone – Racitti, A.
- Sala N-1
- Silva AL-3 – Silva, C. – Aeronautica Lombarda
- Tedeschi E.T.186
- Zögling biposto – Albini, Cella, Facciolo, Moltrasio
- Zannier Friuli – Zannier, Ugo
