= List of aircraft used by the Italian Air Force =

The following is a list of aircraft used by Italian Air Force (Aeronautica Militare) since its formation on June 18, 1946.

== Aircraft ==
| Aircraft model | Aircraft code | Image | Name | Role | 1st flight | Service entry | No. used | Refs |
|---|---|---|---|---|---|---|---|---|
A
| Aerfer Ariete | — | | Ariete | fighter | 27 March 1958 | evaluation | 2 | |
| Aerfer Sagittario 2 | — | | Sagittario | fighter | 19 May 1956 | evaluation | 2 | |
| Aeritalia F-104S | — | | Starfighter | interceptor | 22 December 1966 | 1969 | 205 | |
| Aeritalia G.222A | C-222A | | — | transport | 18 May 1970 | April 1978 | 44 | |
| Aeritalia G.222 RM | RC-222 | | — | navigation aid calibration | 18 May 1970 | April 1978 | 4 | |
| Aeritalia G.222 SAA | — | | — | firefighting | 18 May 1970 | April 1978 | 4 | |
| Aeritalia G.222 TCM | C-222B | | — | prototype demonstrator | 18 May 1970 | April 1978 | 2 | |
| Aeritalia G.222 VS | EC-222 | | — | electronic warfare | 18 May 1970 | April 1978 | 2 | |
| Aermacchi AL-60 | — | | — | utility | 15 September 1959 | 1962 | 1 | |
| Aermacchi MB-326 | — | | — | trainer | 10 December 1957 | 1961 | 135 | |
| Aermacchi MB-326G | — | | — | trainer | 10 December 1957 | 1961 | 2 | |
| Aermacchi MB-339A MLU | T-339A MLU | | — | trainer | 12 August 1976 | 1979 | 72 | |
| Aermacchi MB-339CD | FT-339CD | | — | trainer | 12 August 1976 | 1979 | 30 | |
| Aermacchi MB-339PAN | AT-339A | | — | aerobatic | 12 August 1976 | 1979 | 21 | |
| Aermacchi MB-339RM | RT-339A | | — | navigation aid calibration | 12 August 1976 | 1979 | 3 | |
| Aermacchi M-345 | T-345A | | — | trainer | 1 June 2005 | 2020 | 13 + on order | |
| Agusta A.101G | — | | — | transport helicopter | 19 October 1964 | 1969 | 1 | |
| Agusta A.102 | — | | — | utility helicopter | 3 February 1959 | 1961 | 3 | |
| Agusta A.105 | — | | — | utility helicopter | October 1964 | 1964 | 2 | |
| Agusta A.109 | — | | Hirundo | utility helicopter | 4 August 1971 | 1986 | 3 | |
| Agusta AZ.8L | — | | — | transport | 9 June 1958 | 1959 | 1 | |
| Agusta CP-110 | — | | — | utility | 1951 | evaluation | 1 | |
| Agusta-Bell AB.47 G2 | — | | — | utility helicopter | 8 December 1945 | 1954 | 35 | |
| Agusta-Bell AB.47J; AB.47J.3 | — | | — | utility helicopter | 8 December 1945 | 1954 | 93 | |
| Agusta-Bell AB 204A; AB.204B | — | | — | utility helicopter | 22 October 1956 | 1963 | 48 | |
| Agusta-Bell AB.212 | HH-212A | | Twin Huey | utility helicopter SAR | 1968 | 1975 | 36 | |
| Agusta Sikorsky SH-3D/TS | VH-3D | | Sea King | VIP transport | 11 March 1959 | 1975 | 2 | |
| AgustaWestland AW101 | HH-101A | | Caesar | combat search and rescue | 9 October 1987 | 8 July 2015 | 12 | |
| AgustaWestland AW139 | HH-139A | | — | SAR utility helicopter | 3 February 2001 | January 2012 | 15 | |
| AgustaWestland AW139 | HH-139B | | — | SAR utility helicopter | 3 February 2001 | 21 November 2020 | 17 | |
| AgustaWestland AW139 | VH-139A | | — | VIP transport | 3 February 2001 | 2012 | 4 | |
| Airbus A319CJ | VC-319A | | — | VIP transport | 22 February 1987 | 2000 | 4 | |
| Airbus A340-541 | — | | — | VIP transport | 11 February 2002 | 2 February 2016 | 1 on lease | |
| Alaparma Baldo | — | | Baldo | utility | 1949 | 1949 | 10 | |
| Alenia Aermacchi M-346 | T-346A | | Master | trainer | 15 July 2004 | — | 22 | |
| Alenia C-27J | C-27J | | Spartan | transport | 24 September 1999 | October 2006 | 12 | |
| Alenia EC-27J JEDI | YEC-27J JEDI | | Spartan | electronic warfare | 24 September 1999 | 2012 | 1 | |
| AM.12 | — | — | Albatross | glider | 1951 | 1951 | 3 | |
| Ambrosini CVV.6 | — | | Canguro (Kangaroo) | glider | 1941 | 1946 | 32 | |
| Ambrosini SAI.7 | — | | — | racing aircraft trainer | July 1939 | 1946 | 154 | |
| Ambrosini S.1001 | — | | Grifo (Griffin) | utility | 1947 | 1948 | 3 | |
| Ambrosini Sagittario | — | | Sagittario | research aircraft | 5 January 1953 | 1953 | 1 | |
| AMX International | A-11B | | Ghibli (Sirocco) | ground attack | 15 May 1984 | 1989 | 110 | |
| AMX International | TA-11B | | Ghibli (Sirocco) | trainer | 15 May 1984 | 1989 | 26 | |
| ATR 72 MP | P-72A | | — | maritime patrol | 27 October 1988 | 2016 | 4 | |
| AVIA FL.3 | — | | — | utility | 1939 | 1946 | 335 | |
B
| Beech AT-7C | — | | Expeditor | trainer utility | 15 January 1937 | 1949 | 1 | |
| Beech C-45F | — | | Expeditor | trainer utility | 15 January 1937 | 1949 | 124 | |
| Beechcraft Super King Air 350ER | — | | Super King Air | SIGINT | 27 October 1972 | 2017 | 2 on lease | |
| Bell 47D-1 | — | | — | trainer | 8 December 1945 | 1 February 1953 | 3 | |
| Bell P-39N/Q | — | | Airacobra | fighter | 6 April 1938 | 1946 | 170 | |
| Bell OH-13H | — | | Sioux | observation helicopter | 8 December 1945 | 1976 | 38 | |
| Boeing 707 T/T | KC-707A | | — | tanker transport | 20 December 1957 | March 1992 | 4 | |
| Boeing KC-767 | KC-767A | | — | tanker transport | 21 May 2005 | 2011 | 4 | |
| Breda Nardi NH-500E | TH-500B | | Defender | trainer liaison SAR | 1976 | 1990 | 50 | |
| Breda-Pittoni BP.471 | — | | — | utility transport | 1950 | 1950 | 1 | |
| Breda-Zappata BZ.308 | — | | — | transport | 27 August 1948 | 1949 | 1 | |
| Breguet Atlantic | P-1150A | | Atlantic | maritime patrol SAR | 21 October 1961 | 1971 | 18 | |
C
| Canadair CL13 Sabre Mk.4 | — | | Sabre | fighter | 9 August 1950 | 1956 | 179 | |
| Canadair CL-215-1A-10 | — | | — | aerial firefighting | 23 October 1967 | 31 October 1984 | 4 | |
| CANT Z.501 | — | | Gabbiano (Seagull) | patrol | 1934 | 1946 | 1 | |
| CANT Z.506 | — | | Airone (Heron) | patrol | 19 August 1935 | 1946 | 14 | |
| CANT Z.1007 | — | | Alcione (Kingfisher) | trainer | March 1937 | n/a | 1 | |
| Caproni Ca.100 | — | | — | trainer | 1928 | 1946 | n/a | |
| Caproni Ca.133 | — | | — | transport | 1934 | 1946 | 68 | |
| Caproni Ca.164 | — | | — | trainer | 17 November 1938 | 1946 | n/a | |
| Caproni Ca.309 | — | | Ghibli (Sirocco) | reconnaissance | 1937 | 1946 | 4 | |
| Caproni Ca.313 | — | | — | bomber reconnaissance | 22 December 1939 | 1946 | 80 | |
| Caproni Ca.314 | — | | —- | bomber | 1940 | 1946 | 200 | |
| Caproni Trento F-5 | — | | — | trainer | 20 May 1952 | 1952 | 1 | |
| Caproni Vizzola Calif | A-21S | | Calif | glider | 23 November 1970 | 1977 | 2 | |
| Convair CV-440-75 | — | | Metropolitan | transport | 16 March 1947 | 1964 | 1 | |
| Convair CV-440-81 | — | | Metropolitan | VIP transport | 16 March 1947 | 1961 | 2 | |
| Convair CV-440-96 | — | | Metropolitan | transport | 16 March 1947 | 1957 | 1 | |
| Curtiss SB2C | — | | Helldiver | antisom | 18 December 1940 | 1950 | 42 | |
D
| Dassault Falcon 50 | VC-50A | | Falcon | VIP transport | 7 November 1976 | 1985 | 4 | |
| Dassault Falcon 900EX | VC-900A | | Falcon | VIP transport | 21 September 1984 | 2000 | 5 | |
| de Havilland Vampire FB.5 | — | | Vampire | fighter | 20 September 1943 | 1950 | 5 | |
| de Havilland Vampire FB.52 | — | | Vampire | fighter | 20 September 1943 | 1950 | 201 | |
| de Havilland Vampire FB.52A | — | | Vampire | fighter | 20 September 1943 | 1950 | 51 | |
| de Havilland Vampire FB.54 | — | | Vampire | fighter | 20 September 1943 | 1950 | 10 | |
| de Havilland Vampire NF.10 | — | | Vampire | fighter | 20 September 1943 | 1950 | 4 | |
| de havilland Venom FB.50 | — | | Venom | fighter bomber | 2 September 1949 | 1953 | 2 | |
| Douglas C-47 | — | | Skytrain | transport | 23 December 1941 | 1949 | 19 | |
| Douglas C-53 | — | | Skytrooper | transport | 23 December 1941 | 1949 | 8 | |
| Douglas DC-6 | — | | — | VIP transport | 15 February 1946 | 1952 | 6 | |
E
| Eurofighter 2000 | F-2000A | | Typhoon | fighter | 24 March 1994 | 2004 | 81 | |
| Eurofighter 2000 | TF-2000A | | Typhoon | trainer | 24 March 1994 | 2004 | 14 | |
F
| Fairchild C-119G | — | | Flying Boxcar | transport | 17 November 1947 | 19 May 1953 | 45 | |
| Fairchild C-119J | — | | Flying Boxcar | transport | 17 November 1947 | 1953 | 25 | |
| Fairchild UC-61K | — | | Forwarder | utility | 1932 | 1947 | 4 | |
| Fiat F-86K | — | | Sabre | fighter | 1 October 1947 | November 1955 | 179 | |
| Fiat G.8 | — | | — | utility | 24 February 1934 | 1950 | 3 | |
| Fiat G.12 | — | | — | transport | 15 October 1940 | 1946 | 35 | |
| Fiat G.46 | — | | — | trainer | 25 February 1948 | 1949 | 141 | |
| Fiat G.49 | — | | — | trainer | September 1952 | 1952 evaluation | 2 | |
| Fiat G.59 4B | — | | — | trainer | 12 September 1951 | 1951 | 74 | |
| Fiat G.80 | — | | — | trainer | 9 December 1951 | 1952 | 3 | |
| Fiat G.82 | — | | — | trainer | 23 May 1954 | 1954 | 4 | |
| Fiat G.91 | — | | — | fighter bomber | 9 August 1956 | 1958 | 31 | |
| Fiat G.91R | — | | — | light attack reconnaissance | 14 November 1958 | 1959 | 97 | |
| Fiat G.91 PAN | — | | — | aerobatic | 31 May 1960 | — | 16 | |
| Fiat G.91T | — | | — | trainer | 31 May 1960 | 1964 | 103 | |
| Fiat G.91Y | — | | — | fighter bomber | 27 December 1966 | 1970 | 65 | |
| Fiat G.212 | — | | — | transport | 19 January 1947 | 1949 | 44 | |
| Fiat RS.14 | — | | — | maritime reconnaissance | May 1939 | 1946 | 6 | |
| Fokker F27-600 | — | | Friendship | navigation aid calibration | 24 November 1955 | — | 2 on lease from ATI | |
G
| General Atomics MQ-1 Predator | MQ-1C | | Predator A+ | remote piloted aircraft | 3 July 1994 | 2003 | 6 | |
| General Atomics MQ-9 Reaper | MQ-9A | | Predator B | remote piloted aircraft | 2 February 2001 | 2003 | 6 | |
| General Dynamics F-16A | F-16A | | Fighting Falcon | fighter | 20 January 1974 | 2001-2012 | 30 | |
| General Dynamics F-16B | F-16B | | Fighting Falcon | fighter | 20 January 1974 | 2001-2012 | 4 | |
| Grob G103 Twin Astir | G-103 | | Twin Astir | glider | 31 December 1976 | 1977 | 9 | |
| Grumman SA-16A | — | | Albatross | SAR flying boat | 24 October 1947 | 1958 | 13 | |
| Grumman S2F-1 | — | | Tracker | ASW aircraft | 4 December 1952 | 1957 | 45 | |
| Gulfstream III | — | | — | VIP transport | 2 December 1979 | 1985 | 2 | |
H
| Helio H-395 | — | | Courier | liaison | 14 April 1949 | 1961 | 1 | |
I
| IAI EL/W-2085 | G550 CAEW | | — | airborne early warning and control | 28 November 1995 | 2016 | 2 | |
| IMAM Ro.41 | — | | — | fighter trainer | 16 June 1934 | 1946 | n/a | |
L
| LAK-17 | UG-17A | | — | glider | n/a | n/a | n/a | |
| Lake LA-250 | — | | Seawolf | utility amphibian | 1982 | 1985 evaluation | 1 | |
| LET L 13 | — | | Blaník | glider | 1956 | 1977 | 2 | |
| Lockheed C-130H | — | | Hercules | transport | 23 August 1954 | 9 May 1972 | 14 | |
| Lockheed F-5 | — | | Lightning | reconnaissance | 27 January 1939 | 1950 | 69 | |
| Lockheed F-104G | — | | Starfighter | interceptor fighter | 7 June 1960 | 1963 | 124 | |
| Lockheed RF-104G | — | | Starfighter | reconnaissance | 7 June 1960 | 1963 | 20 | |
| Lockheed TF-104G | — | | Starfighter | trainer | 7 June 1960 | 1965 | 30 | |
| Lockheed P-38L | — | | Lightning | heavy fighter | 27 January 1939 | 1946 | 110 | |
| Lockheed PV-2 | — | | Harpoon | patrol bomber | 31 July 1941 | 1953 | 22 | |
| Lockheed T-33A | — | | Shooting Star | trainer | 22 March 1948 | 1952 | 60 | |
| Lockheed RT-33A | — | | Shooting Star | reconnaissance | 22 March 1948 | 1952 | 14 | |
| Lockheed Martin C-130J | C-130J | | Hercules II | transport | 5 April 1996 | 18 August 2000 | 12 | |
| Lockheed Martin C-130J-30 | C-130J-30 | | Hercules II | transport | 5 April 1996 | 18 August 2000 | 10 | |
| Lockheed Martin F-35 | F-35A (CTOL); F-35B (STOVL) | | Lightning II | joint strike fighter | 15 December 2006 | 3 December 2015 | 3 + 72 on order | |
M
| Macchi C.200 | — | | Saetta (Lightning) | fighter trainer | 24 December 1937 | 1946 | n/a | |
| Macchi C.202 | — | | Folgore (Thunderbolt) | fighter | 24 December 1937 | 1946 | n/a | |
| Macchi C.205 | — | | Veltro (Greyhound) | fighter | 12 April 1942 | 1946 | n/a | |
| Macchi M.416 | — | | — | trainer | 18 December 1947 | 1951 | 178 | |
| Macchi MB.308 | — | | — | utility | 19 January 1947 | 1948 | 81 | |
| Macchi MB.323 | — | | — | trainer | 1952 | 1952 | 2 | |
| Martin 187 | — | | Baltimore | bomber | 14 June 1941 | 1946 | 49 | |
| McDonnell Douglas DC-9-30 | — | | — | VIP transport | 25 February 1965 | 12 January 1974 | 2 | |
N
| Nardi FN.305 | — | | — | trainer liaison | 19 February 1935 | 1946 | 10 | |
| North American P-51D | — | | Mustang | fighter | 26 October 1940 | 1948 | 173 | |
| North American T-6G | — | | Texan; Harvard | trainer | 1 April 1935 | 1950 | 238 | |
P
| Panavia Tornado ADV | — | | Tornado | interceptor | 27 October 1979 | 5 July 1995 | 24 leased from RAF | |
| Panavia Tornado ECR | EA-200B | | Tornado | multirole strike aircraft | 14 August 1974 | 27 February 1998 | 16 | |
| Panavia Tornado IDS | A-200A | | Tornado | multirole strike aircraft | 5 December 1975 | 1982 | 84 | |
| Percival Proctor | — | | — | radio trainer | 8 October 1939 | 1946 | 2 | |
| Piaggio P.136 | — | | Royal Gull | amphibian | 29 August 1948 | 1951 | 22 | |
| Piaggio P.148 | — | | — | aerobatic trainer | 12 February 1951 | 1951 | 61 | |
| Piaggio P.149 | — | | — | trainer liaison | July 1953 | 1953 | 2 | |
| Piaggio P.150 | — | | — | trainer | 1952 | 1952 | 1 | |
| Piaggio P.166M | U-166A | | — | trainer utility | 26 November 1957 | 1961 | 50 | |
| Piaggio P.166BL2 | — | | — | photo survey | 26 November 1957 | 1968 | 2 | |
| Piaggio P.166DL3 | U-166B | | — | photo survey | 1978 | 1984 | 6 | |
| Piaggio P.180 | VC-180A; VC-180B | | Avanti | utility liaison | 26 September 1986 | 1994 | 17 | |
| Piaggio PD.808 | — | | — | VIP transport radio calibration electronic warfare utility | 29 August 1964 | 1970 | 22 | |
R
| Republic P-47D | — | | Thunderbolt | fighter bomber | 6 May 1941 | 1950 | 77 | |
| Republic F-84F | — | | Thunderstreak | fighter bomber | 3 June 1950 | 1956 | 194 | |
| Republic F-84G | — | | Thunderjet | fighter bomber | 28 February 1946 | May 1952 | 254 | |
| Republic RF-84F | — | | Thunderflash | photo reconnaissance | 3 June 1950 | 1956 | 78 | |
S
| SAIMAN 202 | — | | — | liaison | 1938 | 1946 | n/a | |
| Savoia-Marchetti SM.75 | — | | Marsupiale (Marsupial) | transport | 1937 | 1946 | n/a | |
| Savoia-Marchetti SM.79 | — | | Sparviero (Sparrow-hawk) | bomber | 2 September 1935 | 1946 | n/a | |
| Savoia-Marchetti SM.82 | — | | Marsupiale (Marsupial) | bomber transport | 30 October 1939 | 1946 | circa 30 | |
| Savoia-Marchetti SM.84 | — | | — | bomber | 5 June 1940 | 1946 | 1 | |
| Savoia-Marchetti SM.95 | — | | — | transport | 8 May 1943 | 1946 | 7 | |
| Schempp-Hirth Nimbus-4 | G4-D; G4-DM | | Nimbus 4 | glider | 1990 | 1999 | n/a | |
| Schempp-Hirth Ventus-2 | G-2; G-2B | | Ventus-2 | glider | 1994 | 1999 | n/a | |
| SIAI-Marchetti S.208M | U-208A | | — | liaison | 1965 | 1967 | 44 | |
| SIAI-Marchetti SF.260AM | T-260A | | — | trainer | 15 July 1964 | 1976 | 44 | |
| SIAI-Marchetti SF.260EA | T-260B | | — | trainer | 15 July 1964 | 2005 | 30 | |
| SIAI-Marchetti SM.102 | — | | — | transport | 1949 | 1951 | 24 | |
| Sikorsky H-5 | — | | Dragonfly | utility helicopter | 18 September 1943 | 1952 | 3 | |
| Sikorsky H-19A | — | | Chickasaw | utility helicopter | 10 November 1949 | 1954 | 2 | |
| Sikorsky H-19D | — | | Chickasaw | utility helicopter | 10 November 1949 | 1954 | 4 | |
| Sikorsky H-34G | — | | — | helicopter | 8 March 1954 | 1959 | 18 | |
| Sikorsly HH-3F | — | | Pelican | transport SAR | 1959 | 1977 | 35 | |
| Silvercraft SH-4 | — | | — | utility helicopter | 1963 | evaluation | 1 | |
| Stinson L-5 | — | | Sentinel | liaison / observation / trainer | 1941 | 1947 | 119 | |
| Supermarine Spitfire Mk V | — | | Spitfire | fighter | 5 March 1936 | 1946 | 33 | |
| Supermarine Spitfire Mk IX | — | | Spitfire | fighter | 5 March 1936 | 1946 | 110 | |
T
| Tecnam P2006T | T-2006A | | — | trainer | 13 September 2007 | 5 July 2016 | 3 | |
| Temco T-35 | — | | Buckaroo | trainer | 1948 | 1950 | 1 | |
W
| Westland S-51 | — | | Dragonfly | helicopter | 5 October 1948 | 1 February 1953 | 2 | |
