= IMAM =

Former Italian aircraft manufacturer

- Company type: S.p.A.
- Predecessor: IMAM
- Founded: 1923
- Founder: Nicola Romeo
- Successor: Aerfer (1955)
- Headquarters: Naples, Kingdom of Italy
- Area served: Worldwide
- Key people: Alessandro Tonini; Giovanni Galasso
- Parent: Società Italiana Ernesto Breda

IMAM (Industrie Meccaniche e Aeronautiche Meridionali) was an Italian aircraft manufacturer founded in Naples in 1923 by the engineer Nicola Romeo. In 1955 it merged into Aerfer.

== History ==
The Industrie Meccaniche e Aeronautiche Meridionali had its origins in the aircraft division of OFM (Officine Ferroviarie Meridionali), an Italian railway and rolling stock manufacturing company owned by Nicola Romeo. Romeo hired Alessandro Tonini, an aeronautical engineer experienced in aerodynamics and airplane design, as OFM's chief designer. OFM contacted Fokker and got production licence for the Fokker C.V. It was built by the Naples factory in 1927 as the OFM Ro.1.

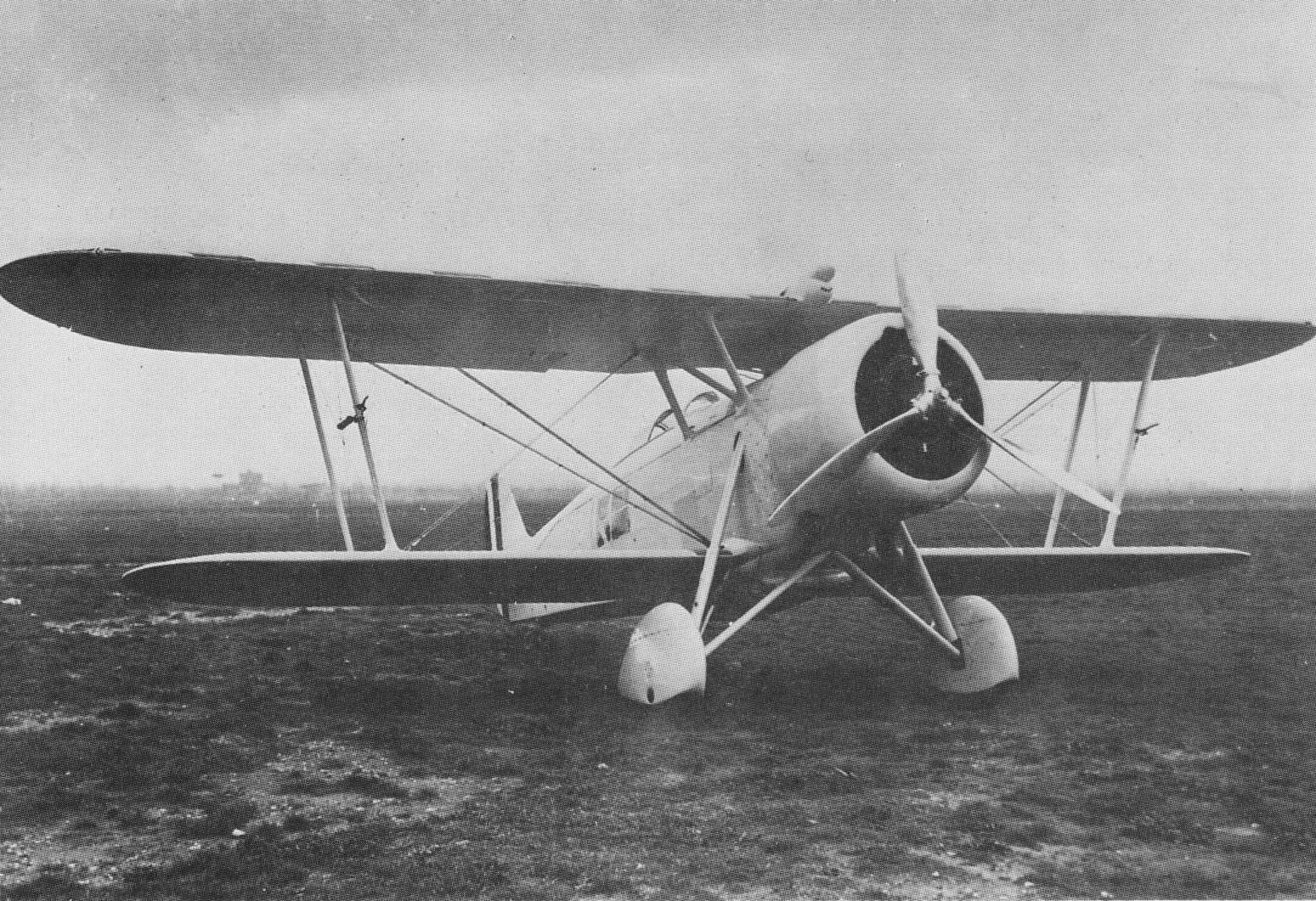
IMAM Ro.37bis

On 27 October 1934, Romeo spun off the aircraft business, renamed, as the Società Anonima Industrie Aeronautiche Romeo (IAR). The most successful aircraft produced by IAR was the Ro.37 Lince. The first prototype Ro.37 flew in November 1933. In 1935, OFM (the railway workshop) was sold to Società Italiana Ernesto Breda. Romeo later sold Società Anonima Industrie Aeronautiche Romeo to Società Italiana Ernesto Breda, which later became the Industrie Meccaniche e Aeronautiche Meridionali (IMAM). The new company continued Ro.37 recon biplane, Ro.41 fighter biplane, Ro.51 fighter monoplane (land/seaplane versions) and developed Ro.43/44 seaplanes, Ro.57/58 twin-engined fighters and STOL Ro.63.

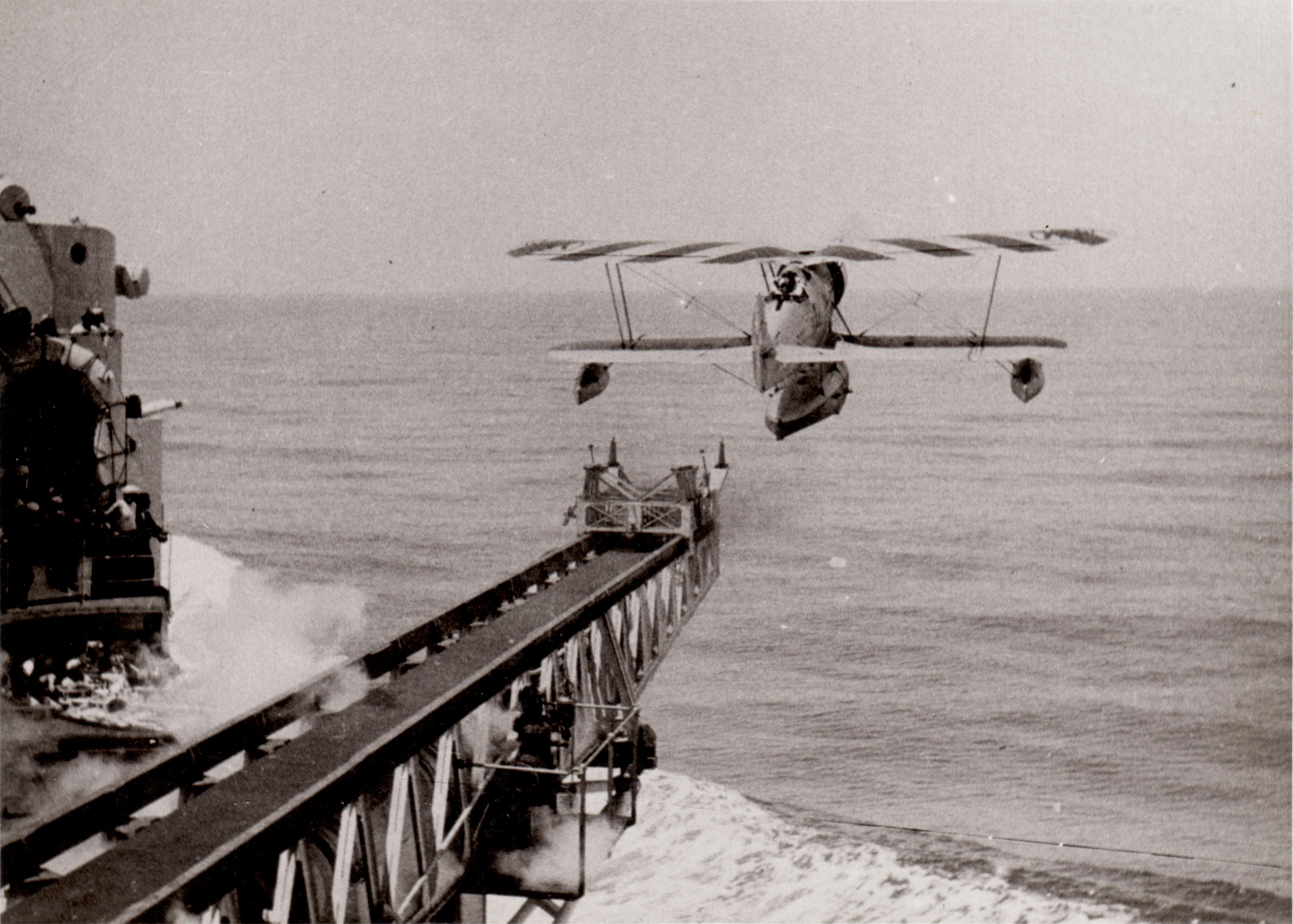
An IMAM Ro.43 floatplane catapulted by a RM cruiser in the early 1940s

Approximately 125 Ro.43 catapult floatplanes were built for the Regia Marina. The type was in service at the battle of Calabria in July 1940 and the battle of Cape Matapan in March 1941. In addition to their use aboard ships, a few Ro.43's (average strength, four floatplanes) were employed by the 161ª Squadriglia Caccia Marina of the Aeronautica dell'Egeo as fighter protection for the Italian-held islands in the Aegean Sea.

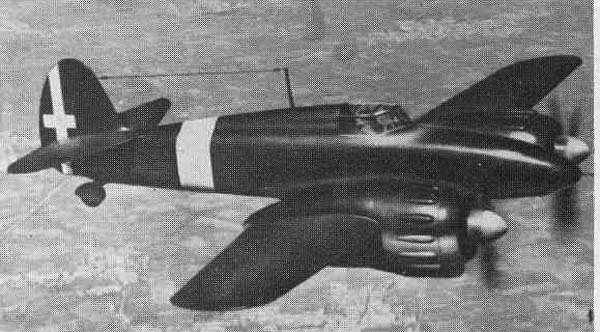
Ro.57bis

In 1939, Meridionali projected a twin-engined single-seat fighter, the Ro.57. Powered by two 840 h.p. Fiat A.74 R.C.38 radials, the Ro.57 carried two 12.7 mm. and two 20 mm. guns in the nose, and attained a maximum speed of 500 km/h (310.5 mph). Designed by Giovanni Galasso, the IMAM Ro.57 began to leave the production lines of the Naples factory early in 1942, and entered service in small numbers with the Regia Aeronautica as a fighter-bomber because of its comparatively low speed and poor manoeuvrability. From the Ro.57 was developed the Ro.57bis, evolved from the start as a fighter bomber and dive bomber. Although it was similarly powered, two 20 mm cannon were added to the 12.7 mm machine-guns and dive-brakes were installed. Carrying up to a 500 kg (1,102 lb) bomb under its fuselage, this version was fairly successful but had faded from the scene before the Armistice of Cassibile.

The Ro.63, a short-range reconnaissance and light transport aircraft of comparable quality and reliability or even superior to its German competitor, the Fieseler Fi 156 Storch, was not put into production in significant numbers due to the shortage of available engines.

After World War II Officine di Pomigliano per le Costruzioni Aeronautiche e Ferroviarie-Aerfer was constituted and in 1955 merged with IMAM to form Aerfer. Aerfer worked notably on the first generation Italian jet fighter prototypes Sagittario and Ariete.

== Aircraft ==
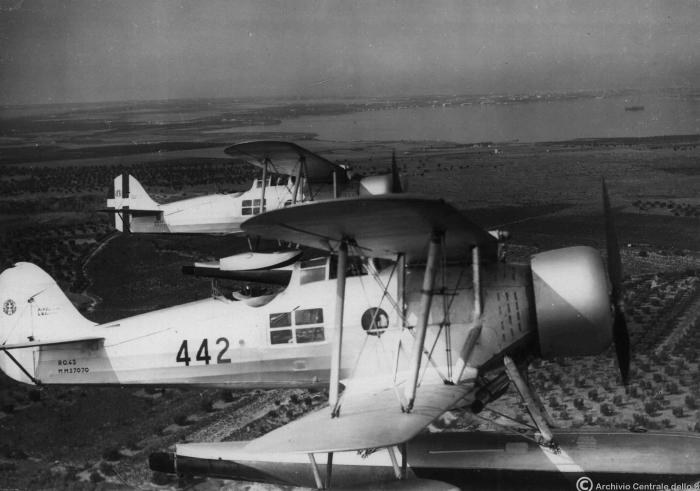
IMAM Ro.43 catapult floatplanes

IMAM aircraft included:

- Ro.5, acrobatic sportsplane, 1929
- Ro.26, biplane trainer aircraft, 1932
- Ro.30, observation biplane, 1932
- Ro.35, single-seat glider, 1933
- Ro.37 Lince (Lynx), multirole reconnaissance biplane, 1933
- Ro.41, biplane fighter, 1934
- Ro.43, reconnaissance single float seaplane, 1934
- Ro.44, fighter seaplane, 1936
- Ro.51, fighter aircraft, 1937
- Ro.57, monoplane fighter, 1939
- Ro.58, monoplane heavy fighter and attack aircraft, 1942
- Ro.63, STOL reconnaissance aircraft, 1940

== See also ==
- List of Italian aircraft companies

== Bibliography ==
- Green, William (1961). Warplanes of the Second World War. Vol. 2: Fighters. London: Macdonald. pp. 153–154.
- Thompson, Jonathan W. (1963). Italian Civil and Military aircraft 1930–1945 (1st ed.). New York: Aero Publishers Inc. ISBN 0-8168-6500-0.
- Green, William (1967). War Planes of the Second World War. Vol. 6: Floatplanes. Garden City, NY: Doubleday. pp. 111–13.
- Taylor, Michael John Haddrick (1980). Jane's Encyclopedia of Aviation. Vol. 4. Danbury, Connecticut: Grolier Educational Corporation. pp. 687–688.
- Gunston, Bill (1993). World Encyclopaedia of Aircraft Manufacturers: From the Pioneers to the Present Day. Annapolis, Maryland: Naval Institute Press. ISBN 9781557509390.
- Lembo, Daniele (October–November 2003). "Officine Meccaniche Meridionali". Aerei Nella Storia (34). Parma: Delta editions.
- Callaway, Tim (31 May 2013). "Alenia Aermacchi: Officine Ferroviarie Meridionali and Industrie Aeronautiche Romeo". Aviation Classics Magazine (20). Archived from the original on 12 December 2013.
