= Aerfer =

Aircraft manufacturer in Italy

- Predecessor: IMAM; Officine Ferroviarie Meridionali
- Founded: 1955
- Defunct: 1969
- Successor: Aeritalia
- Headquarters: Italy
- Area served: Worldwide

Aerfer was an Italian manufacturing company created in 1955 by the merger of IMAM and Officine Ferroviarie Meridionali. The name is a contraction of Costruzioni Aeronautiche e Ferroviarie (Aeronautical and Railway Constructions).

In the 1950s and 1960s, Aerfer manufactured bodies for trolleybuses for several cities, particularly in Italy (including the Naples trolleybus system), but also some for foreign trolleybus systems, such as those of Mexico City and Istanbul, Turkey.

In 1969, the company merged with Salmoiraghi and the aviation division of Fiat to create Aeritalia.

The firm is remembered mostly in connection with the development of Italy's first supersonic jet, the Aerfer Sagittario 2.

== List of aircraft ==
- SAI.7 (1939) Single propeller engine single-seat racing aircraft
- SAI.7T (1943) Single propeller engine two-seat training aircraft
- S.7 (1949) Single propeller engine two-seat touring aircraft
- Supersette (1951) Single propeller engine two-seat trainer/racing aircraft
- Sagittario (1953) Single jet engine adaptation of S.7 aircraft, with wooden wings and tail surfaces
- Aerfer Sagittario 2 (1956) All-metal development of Sagittario; broke sound barrier
- Aerfer Ariete (1958) Development of Sagittario 2 with additional jet engine for climb and speed
- Aerfer Leone (1959) Proposed development of Sagittario 2 with additional rocket engine for climb and speed (not built)

== See also ==
- List of Italian aircraft companies
