= Ro-35 =

Ro-35 may refer to:

- Japanese submarine Ro-35, an Imperial Japanese Navy submarine commissioned in March 1943 and sunk in August 1943
- Ro-35-class submarine, a term sometimes used for the Kaichu 7 subclass of the Imperial Japanese Navy′s Kaichū-type submarines
- Romeo Ro.35, a single-seat glider built in Italy in 1933
