= Ro-44 =

Ro-44 may refer to:

- IMAM Ro.44, an Italian fighter seaplane of 1936
- Japanese submarine Ro-44, an Imperial Japanese Navy submarine commissioned in 1943 and sunk in 1944
