= Ro-58 =

Ro-58 may refer to:

- IMAM Ro.58, an Italian fighter and attack aircraft of 1942
- Japanese submarine Ro-58, an Imperial Japanese Navy submarine in commission from 1922 to 1945
