= Ro-41 =

Ro-41 may refer to:

- IMAM Ro.41, an Italian biplane fighter and trainer aircraft of the 1930s and 1940s
- Japanese submarine Ro-41, an Imperial Japanese Navy submarine commissioned in November 1943 and sunk in March 1945
