= Ro-30 =

Ro-30 may refer to:

- IMAM Ro.30, an Italian observation biplane of 1932
- Japanese submarine Ro-30, an Imperial Japanese Navy submarine in commission from 1924 to 1938
