= Fabris Febo Paglierini =

Febo Paglierini

General information
- Type: Competition glider
- National origin: Italy
- Manufacturer: Gabardini Cameri
- Designer: Stelio Fabris
- Number built: 1

History
- First flight: 1924

The Fabris Febo Paglierini was an Italian sailplane designed to compete in the first Italian International Competition, held in Asiago in 1924. It was one of the better national entrants, all of which were outclassed by the Germans.

== Design and development ==
The Fabris Febo Paglierini was designed to compete in the first Italian international glider contest, held in 1924 at Asiago. It was a wooden-framed, fabric-covered aircraft with a high, cantilever wing which was rectangular in plan apart from ailerons which broadened out to the tips. Built around twin spars, the wing had a very thick section, strong camber and low aspect ratio. The spars continued from tip to tip but there was a central gap in the surfacing over the fuselage. The wing was mounted centrally on very short struts between fuselage and spars.

The fuselage, which tapered in plan to the tail, seated the pilot in an open cockpit in the central gap between the leading edges. Its tailplane, mounted on top of the fuselage, was small and had a curved leading edge. The elevators were more generous and had a large cut-out for rudder movement. Its fin was triangular and carried a polyangular rudder that reached down to the keel.

Unusually for a glider, the Febo Paglierini's landing gear included both skids and wheels. Each long skid was attached to its lower fuselage longerons by short, vertical struts, two forward and one aft. The forward pair also carried a single axle with two large, wire-spoked wheels.

== Operational history ==
The Assiego contest was originally planned to take place in August with the weather at its best, the date slipped to October as Italian competitors sought more time to complete their aircraft. By then the strong winds, relied on by these early gliders to generate hill lift, had dropped and the inexperienced Italian pilots struggled to compete with the Germans who, because of the post war restrictions on powered flight, had turned to gliding and came to Asiago with more refined designs and more experienced pilots.

Though German entrants flew for 13 -14 minute, only three Italians made an impression, with the best of them (the Cambilargiu Goliardia) managing 126 s. The Teichfuss Condor II crashed mid-contest and the longest flight of the Febo Paglierini, piloted by Cattenéo, lasted just 15 s.

== Specifications ==
Data from Vintage Italian Sailplanes, Pedrelli (2011)

General characteristics

- Crew: 1
- Length: 8 m (26 ft 3 in)
- Wingspan: 12 m (39 ft 4 in)
- Wing area: 30 m^{2} (320 sq ft)
- Aspect ratio: 4.8
- Empty weight: 150 kg (331 lb)
- Gross weight: 230 kg (507 lb)
