= Ro-26 =

Ro-26 or Ro.26 may refer to:

- IMAM Ro.26, also known as the Romeo Ro.26, an Italian trainer and aerobatic aircraft of 1932
- Japanese submarine Ro-26, an Imperial Japanese Navy submarine in commission from 1922 to 1938 and 1939 to 1940
- Ro-26-class submarine, an alternative name for the Kaichū IV subclass of the Japanese Kaichū type submarine
