= IMAM Ro.51 =

Italian fighter prototype

Ro.51
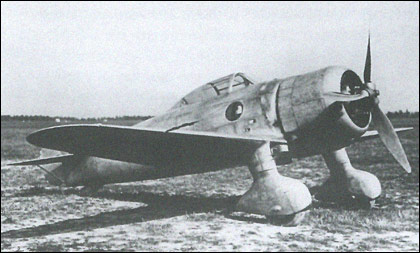

General information
- Type: Fighter
- Manufacturer: IMAM
- Status: Prototype
- Number built: 2

History
- First flight: 1937

The IMAM Ro.51 was an Italian fighter aircraft that first flew in 1937. It was designed for the 1936 new fighter contest for the Regia Aeronautica, with practically all the Italian aircraft builders involved.

== Design ==
The aircraft, designed by the engineer Galasso, was a single-seat, monoplane fighter, of mixed construction (the wings were made of wood), and initially with a fixed undercarriage.

The engine was standard for this generation of fighters, an 840 hp (630 kW) Fiat A.74 RC 38 radial powering a three-blade propeller.

The fixed undercarriage limited the maximum speed to only 467 km/h. It was armed with two Breda-SAFAT 12.7 mm machine guns.

== Development ==
In June 1938 the first prototype, initially fitted with a very small tail, was tested and found inferior to the Macchi C.200 and Fiat G.50. It was overall a poor aircraft. The trials to re-engineer the wing came too late and no orders were made.

The second prototype Ro.51/1, featured a retractable landing gear which boosted its top speed to 489 km/h. It was later converted into a fighter floatplane. Like the Ro.44 it had a large central float and two smaller ones under the wings. The maximum speed dropped to 430 km/h, but endurance was increased to 1,200 km.

Unfortunately during a trial one of the wings suddenly sank in the water. The rest of the aircraft swiftly followed, and the loss of this prototype meant the end of the program. Although performance was apparently fairly good, the project was overall a failure, especially in the early aspects, even if it was not too different from the Fokker D.XXI. But with so many other superior machines also involved, waiting for the problems the Ro.51 had to be fixed was not an option.

== Operators ==
Kingdom of Italy

- Regia Aeronautica

== Specifications (Ro.51 second prototype) ==
Data from The Complete Book of Fighters, Italian Civil and Military Aircraft 1930−1945, airwar.ru : IMAM Ro.51

General characteristics

- Crew: 1
- Length: 7.46 m (24 ft 6 in)
- Wingspan: 9.78 m (32 ft 1 in)
- Height: 2.71 m (8 ft 11 in)
- Wing area: 16.4 m^{2} (177 sq ft)
- Empty weight: 1,666 kg (3,674 lb)
- Gross weight: 2,096 kg (4,620 lb)
- Powerplant: 1 × Fiat A.74 R.C.38 14-cylinder air-cooled radial piston engine, 618 kW (829 hp)
- Propellers: 3-bladed variable-pitch metal propeller

Performance

- Maximum speed: 489 km/h (304 mph, 264 kn) at 5,000 m (16,400 ft)
- Cruise speed: 410 km/h (250 mph, 220 kn)
- Landing speed: 78 km/h (48 mph; 42 kn)
- Range: 1,200 km (750 mi, 650 nmi)
- Service ceiling: 9,000 m (29,530 ft)
- Time to altitude: 6,000 m (19,680 ft) in 7 minutes

Armament

- Guns: 2 × 12.7 mm Breda-SAFAT machine guns

== See also ==
Aircraft of comparable role, configuration, and era

- Fokker D.XXI
- Nakajima Ki-27

Related lists

- List of Regia Aeronautica aircraft used in World War II
- List of fighter aircraft
