= Alfa Romeo 121 =

Air-cooled aircraft engine made in Italy

121
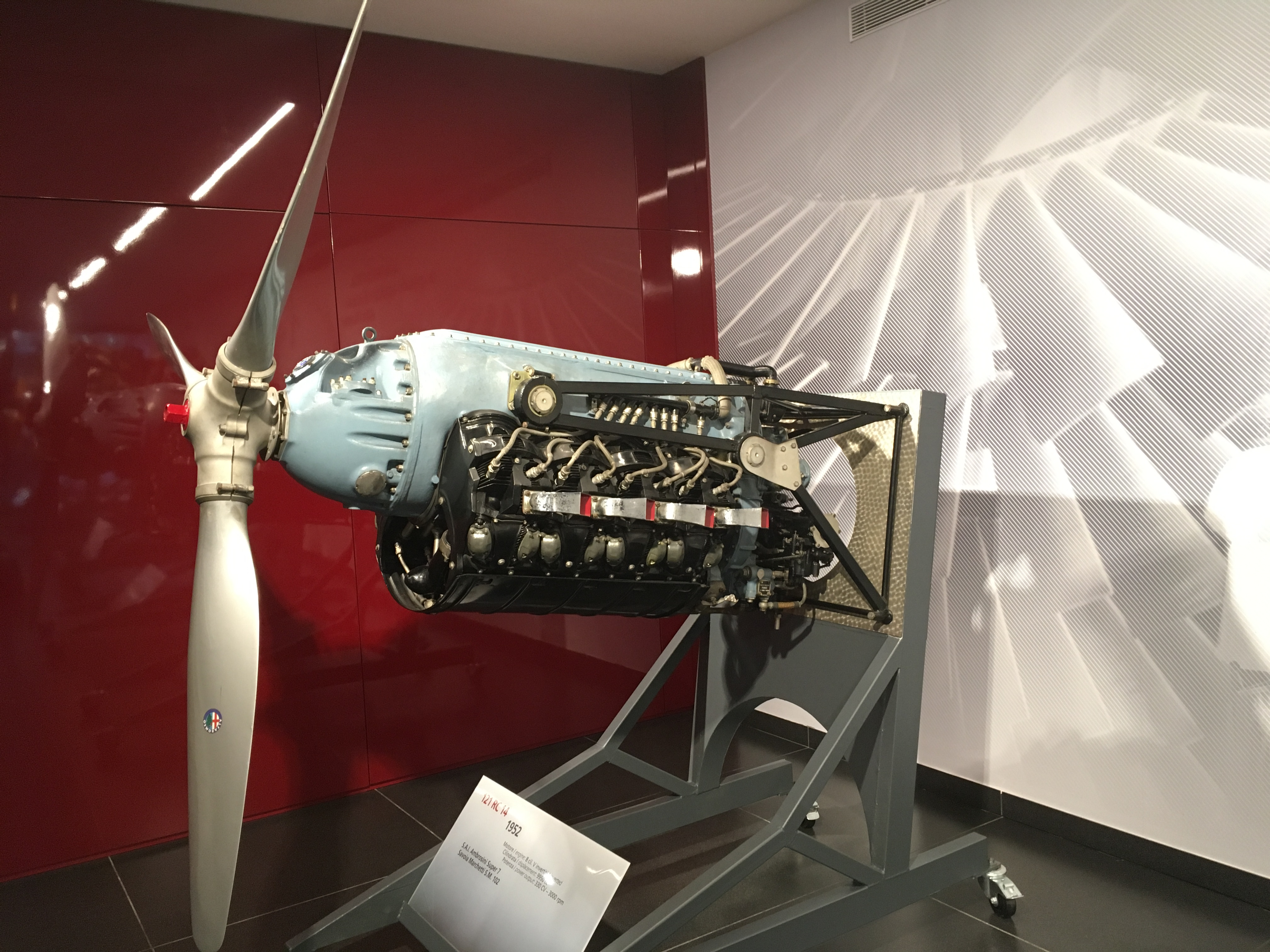
- Alfa Romeo 121 RC14
- Type: V8 aircraft engine
- Manufacturer: Alfa Romeo
- Major applications: Ambrosini S.7

The Alfa Romeo 121 was an eight-cylinder, air-cooled, inverted V engine for aircraft use produced in Italy. It was typically rated at 280 kW (380 hp).

== Variants ==
121 R.C.14
121 R.C.20
121 R.C.22

== Applications ==
- Ambrosini S.7

== Specifications ==
Data from Jane's All The World's Aircraft 1953-54, Jane's all the World's Aircraft 1955-56, Jane's all the World's Aircraft 1947

=== General characteristics ===
- Type: V8 inverted air-cooled engine
- Bore: 120 mm (4.7 in)
- Stroke: 110 mm (4.3 in)
- Displacement: 9.9952 L (609.9 in^{3})
- Length: 1,780 mm (70.08 in)
- Width: 684 mm (26.9 in)
- Height: 700 mm (27.6 in)
- Dry weight: 345 kg (761 lb)

=== Components ===
- Supercharger: Centrifugal type
- Fuel system: Two horizontal carburettors, or one injection carburettor
- Fuel type: 100/130 octane gasoline
- Oil system: Pressure type.One pressure and three scavenge pumps
- Cooling system: Air cooling
- Reduction gear: Spur gear type: reduction ratio 0.621:1

=== Performance ===
- Power output: 284 kW (381 hp) at 3,000 rpm (take-off), 246 kW (330 hp) at 3,000 rpm (max continuous power)
- Compression ratio: 6.5:1
- Specific fuel consumption: 0.63 lb/(hp⋅h) (0.38 kg/kWh) (take-off power),
- Oil consumption: 2.5 kg/h (5.5 lb/h)
- Power-to-weight ratio: 0.82 kg/kW (1.35 lb/hp)

== See also ==
Related lists

- List of aircraft engines
