= IMAM Ro.44 =

Italian fighter seaplane

Ro.44
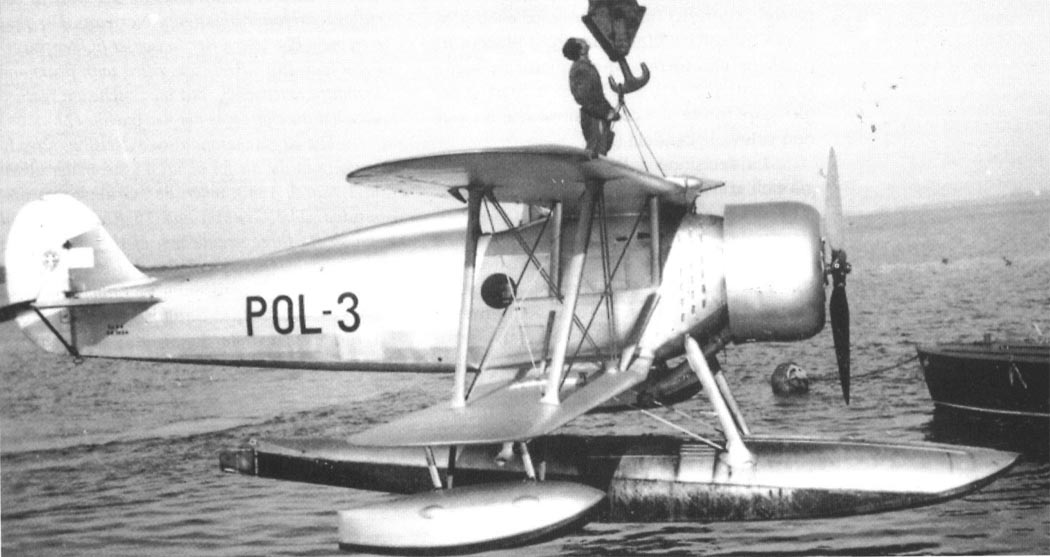
- Ro.44

General information
- Type: Fighter seaplane
- National origin: Italy
- Manufacturer: IMAM
- Designer: Giovanni Galasso
- Number built: 35

History
- First flight: October 1936

The IMAM Ro.44 was a fighter seaplane developed in Italy, a single seater derivative of the Ro.43 that first flew in October 1936. While the Ro.43 had serious problems, the Ro.44 was an utter failure. Armed with two 12.7 mm machine guns fitted in the nose, the rear fuselage of the R.43 was redesigned to dispense with the observer's position, and changes were made to the tail. Overall, performance remained almost identical to that of the Ro.43, although the Ro.44 was more maneuverable.

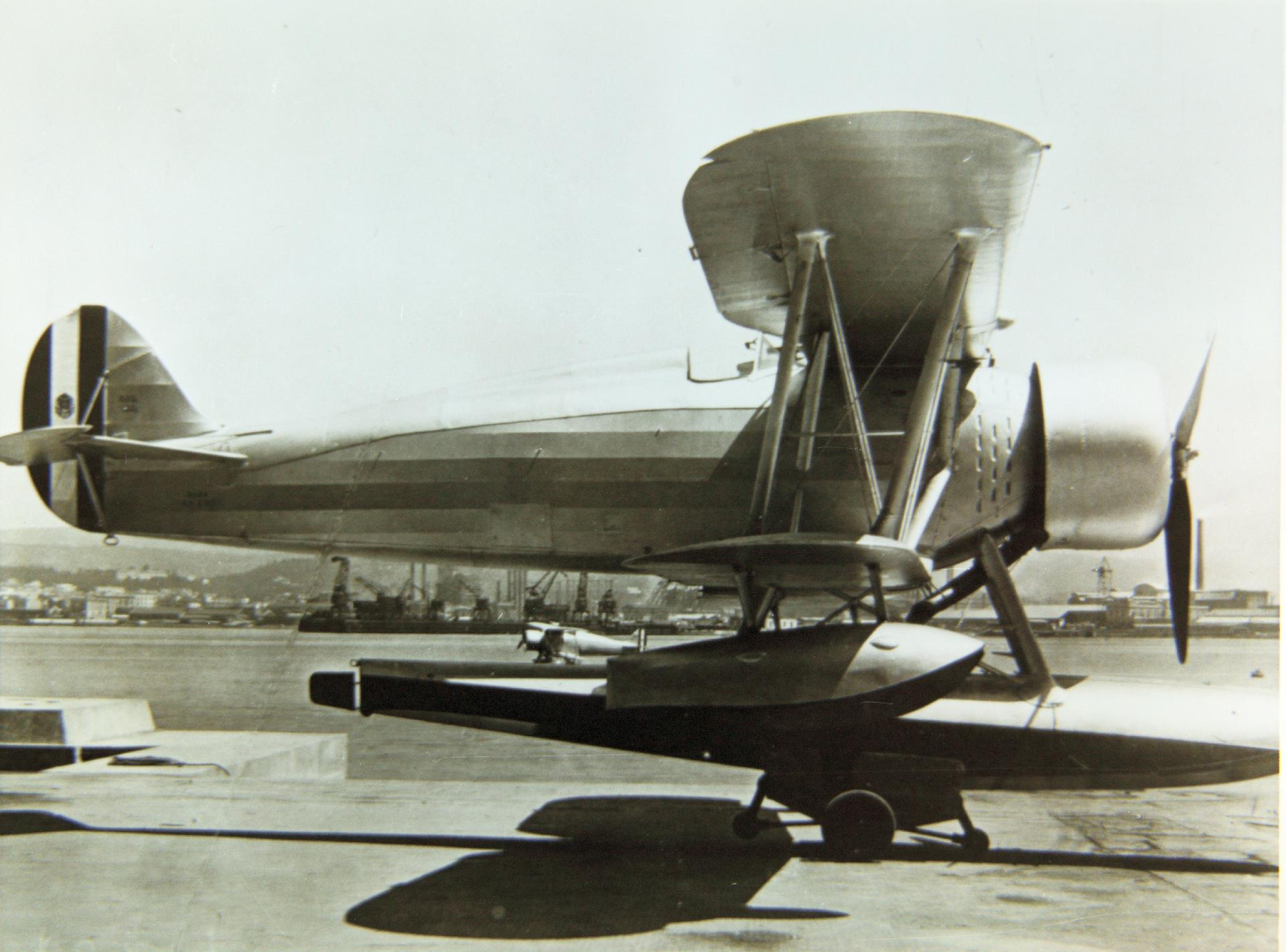
IMAM Ro.44 floatplane fighter

Although it was fast enough to intercept machines like the Fairey Swordfish and Fairey Seafox, its actual performance (and sea-keeping capabilities) was so poor, that out of 51 ordered, only 35 were produced. They were used only in the Aegean Sea, with 161 Squadriglia having seven examples in service at the beginning of World War II but was soon retired from the front line and sent to seaplane schools. This was the last OFM/IMAM biplane to be designed.

== Operators ==
Kingdom of Italy

- Regia Aeronautica

== Specifications ==
Data from War Planes of the Second World War:Volume Six Floatplanes

General characteristics

- Crew: One pilot
- Length: 9.72 m (31 ft 10.5 in)
- Wingspan: 11.58 m (37 ft 11.63 in)
- Height: 3.51 m (11 ft 6.13 in)
- Wing area: 33.4 m^{2} (359 sq ft)
- Empty weight: 1,674 kg (3,691 lb)
- Gross weight: 2,226 kg (4,907 lb)
- Powerplant: 1 × Piaggio P.X R , 520 kW (700 hp)

Performance

- Maximum speed: 311 km/h (193 mph, 168 kn)
- Cruise speed: 188 km/h (117 mph, 102 kn)
- Range: 1,200 km (745 mi, 647 nmi)
- Endurance: 2 hours
- Service ceiling: 7,000 m (23,000 ft)

Armament

- 2 × fixed, forward-firing 12.7 mm machine guns

== See also ==
Related lists

- List of Interwar military aircraft
