= Tedeschi E.T.186 =

E.T.186

General information
- Type: Single seat training glider
- National origin: Italy
- Manufacturer: Students of the Modena Aeronautical Association
- Designer: Enzo Tedeschi
- Number built: 1

History
- First flight: 21 October 1947

The Tedeschi E.T.186 was a simple, single seat training glider built in Italy and first flown in 1947. Only one was constructed.

== Development ==
The single example of the E.T.186 training glider was built to Enzo Tadeschi's design by seven students of the Modena Aeronautical Association. It was a simple, wood-framed aircraft, covered with a mixture of plywood and fabric. Its high single spar wing was mounted over the fuselage on a pedestal and braced to the lower fuselage with a single faired metal strut on each side. The wing was unswept and had constant chord, ending in rounded tips. Ailerons occupied about half the span and the outer wing had 2° of washout to delay the stall over them.

The E.T.186 had a deep sided hexagonal fuselage covered in plywood forwards and fabric aft. Its cockpit was just ahead of the wing leading edge, placing the pilot's head against the front of the central pedestal; the glider could be flown with an open cockpit or alternatively from under a perspex canopy. The fuselage tapered rearwards, where a tapered, round tipped tailplane mounted on top of the fuselage carried separate balanced elevators. A small fin placed over the elevators mounted a full, balanced, rounded rudder; all the tail control surfaces were fabric covered. The main undercarriage of the E.T.186 was a combination of a short, sprung skid reaching from the nose to the wing strut attachment point and a fixed monowheel immediately aft, at about mid-chord. The underside of the rudder was protected by a rounded tail bumper.

The E.T.186 was first flown on 21 October 1947. It was tow-launched behind a jeep at the airfield of the Aero Club of Reggio Emilia.

== Specifications ==
Data from Pedrielli (2011) p.219

General characteristics

- Capacity: One
- Length: 6.50 m (21 ft 4 in)
- Wingspan: 12.0 m (39 ft 4 in)
- Wing area: 13.80 m^{2} (148.5 sq ft)
- Aspect ratio: 10.43
- Airfoil: Göttingen 635 inboard, NACA 0012 at tip
- Empty weight: 140 kg (309 lb)
- Gross weight: 210 kg (463 lb)

Performance

- Maximum glide ratio: estimated 15:1
- Wing loading: 15 kg/m^{2} (3.1 lb/sq ft)
