= IMAM Ro.30 =

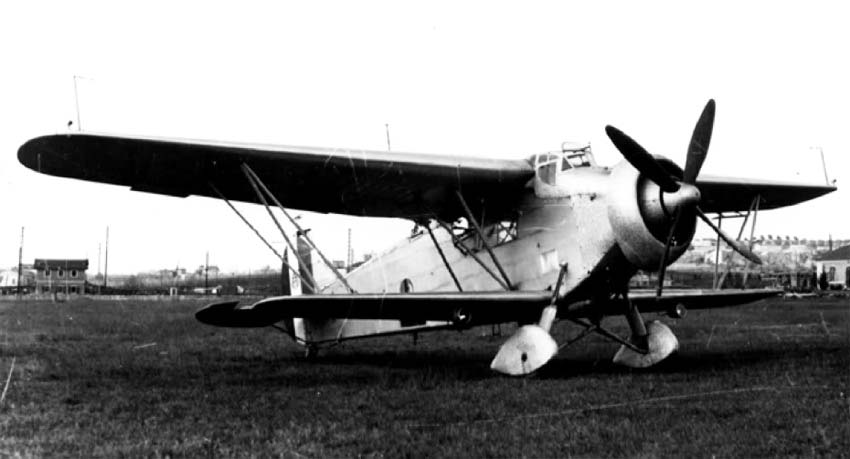

General information
- Type: Observation biplane
- Manufacturer: IMAM
- Primary user: Regia Aeronautica

History
- First flight: 1932

The IMAM Ro.30 was a 1930s Italian observation biplane designed and built by Industrie Meccaniche e Aeronautiche Meridionali. It was only built in limited numbers before being replaced by the Ro.37.

== Development ==
Following the success of earlier observation biplanes the Ro.30 was developed in 1932 for the Regia Aeronautica. It was an unequal-span biplane with a fixed tailwheel landing gear. It had an enclosed cockpit for the pilot located forward of the wing leading edge, an observer had a cabin between the wings, and the third crew member had an open cockpit behind the wings. It was powered either a 395 kW (530 hp) Alfa Romeo Mercury or a 373 kW (530 hp) Piaggio Jupiter radial engine.

== Operators ==
Kingdom of Italy

- Regia Aeronautica

== Specifications (Ro.30 with Jupiter engine) ==
Data from The Illustrated Encyclopedia of Aircraft (Part Work 1982-1985), 1985, Orbis Publishing, Page 2193

General characteristics

- Crew: 3
- Length: 10.24 m (33 ft 7.25 in)
- Wingspan: 15.75 m (51 ft 8 in)
- Height: 3.50 m (11 ft 5.75 in)
- Empty weight: 1,580 kg (3,483 lb)
- Gross weight: 2,630 kg (5,798 lb)
- Powerplant: 1 × Piaggio Jupiter VII radial piston , 373 kW (500 hp)

Performance

- Maximum speed: 225 km/h (140 mph, 120 kn)
- Range: 1,600 km (994 mi, 864 nmi)
- Service ceiling: 7,500 m (24,605 ft)

Armament

- 3 x 7.7mm (0.303in) machine-guns

== See also ==
Related lists

- List of Interwar military aircraft
