= Sala N1 =

N1 Sala

General information
- Type: Performance glider
- National origin: Italy
- Manufacturer: Fratelli Sala
- Designer: Guglielmo Negri
- Number built: 1

History
- First flight: 1933

The Sala N1 or N1 Sala was a single-seat,18 m (59 ft 1 in) span competition glider built in Italy in 1933. Only one was constructed.

== Development ==
The N1 Sala was designed by Guglielmo Negri and built by Fratelli Sala, whose main occupation was the production of wooden propellers for the military. It was a high-wing monoplane, its two part, two spar wing supported centrally on a fuselage pedestal and braced on each side with a pair of parallel wooden faired struts from the spars at about 20% span to the lower fuselage. It was mounted without dihedral and in plan had a rectangular centre section out to about quarter span inboard of long, strongly straight tapered, round tipped outer panels with trailing edges almost entirely filled by the ailerons. The high aspect ratio (21:1) wing was completely fabric covered.

The Sala had a plywood covered, ovoid section fuselage with an open cockpit immediately ahead of the wing pedestal. The cockpit lacked a windscreen but was well instrumented for a glider of the day, with air speed indicator, altimeter, turn and bank indicator and variometer. The fuselage tapered rearwards to the tail where the tailplane, with a straight, swept leading edge and carrying elliptically shaped, aerodynamically balanced elevators, was mounted on top. The fin was no more than a mounting for the tall, curved, balanced rudder, which extended down to the keel and moved in an elevator cut-out. The standard glider ash skid, running from just aft of the nose to below the wing trailing edge and with a single rubber shock absorber served as an undercarriage, assisted by a very small tail skid.

Some authors have suggested the N1 dates from 1937 but reconstructed pre-war Italian civil registers have a May 1933 registration date for I-ABEY, the sole example, based at Milan-Taliedo.

== Specifications ==
Data from Pedrielli (2011) p.205

General characteristics

- Capacity: One
- Length: 6.42 m (21 ft 1 in)
- Wingspan: 18 m (59 ft 1 in)
- Wing area: 15.50 m^{2} (166.8 sq ft)
- Aspect ratio: 21
- Empty weight: 129 kg (284 lb)
- Gross weight: 210 kg (463 lb)

Performance

- Maximum glide ratio: estimated 25:1
- Wing loading: 12.50 kg/m^{2} (2.56 lb/sq ft)
