= Pagliani Vittoria =

Vittoria

General information
- Type: Single-seat glider
- National origin: Italy
- Designer: Armando Pagliani
- Number built: 1

History
- First flight: 1947; 78 years ago

The Pagliani Vittoria was a single-seat glider built in Italy during Second World War. Only one was constructed.

== Development ==
The Vittoria was designed and built between 1941 and 1942 by Armando Pagliani and two employees of the Luigi Teichfuss glider works at Pavullo nel Frignano Airport. It was a high-wing monoplane, with its single spar wing supported centrally on a fuselage pedestal and braced on each side from the spar at about one third span to the lower fuselage with a single steel faired strut. White deal ribs defined the wing section, which tapered from Göttingen 535 to the reflexed NACA M6 outboard. In plan the wing had a rectangular centre section and straight-tapered outer panels which ended in rounded tips. The trailing edges of the outer panels were almost entirely occupied by the ailerons.

The Vittoria had a plywood-skinned, hexagonal-cross-section, wooden-framed fuselage, with deep sides which converged somewhat downwards. Its cockpit was immediately in front of the wing pedestal, beneath a framed canopy which lifted off, reinforced by a small part of the upper fuselage skin, for access. Comfortable seating was in-flight adjustable and the visibility was good. The fuselage tapered markedly rearwards as the pedestal dropped away. A straight-edged, round-tipped tailplane was mounted on top of it, carrying elevators with a notch for rudder movement. The fin was very small but mounted a rounded, broad-chord, balanced rudder which reached down to the keel largely to the rear of the elevators. The glider landed on a sprung skid reaching from the nose to beyond mid-chord, assisted by a generous tail bumper.

The Vittoria probably made its first flight in 1942, but little is known of its subsequent history in the Italian Social Republic, except that the sole example was destroyed soon after the Second World War ended in 1945.

== Specifications ==
Data from Pedrielli (2011) p.215

General characteristics

- Capacity: One
- Length: 6.50 m (21 ft 4 in)
- Wingspan: 15.0 m (49 ft 3 in)
- Wing area: 13.50 m^{2} (145.3 sq ft)
- Aspect ratio: 16.7
- Airfoil: Inboard Göttingen 535, tips NACA M6
- Empty weight: 165 kg (364 lb)
- Gross weight: 250 kg (551 lb)

Performance

- Maximum glide ratio: estimated 24:1
- Wing loading: 18.5 kg/m^{2} (3.8 lb/sq ft)
