= IMAM Ro.26 =

Single-engine biplane trainer aircraft

General information
- Type: Trainer
- National origin: Italy
- Manufacturer: IMAM
- Designer: Giovanni Galasso
- Number built: 1

History
- First flight: 1932

The IMAM Ro.26, sometimes called the Romeo Ro.26, was a single-engine biplane trainer aircraft produced by the Italian aeronautical company IMAM in the early 1930s. Only one example was built.

== Development ==
At the beginning of 1932, the Italian company SA Industrie Meccaniche e Aeronautiche Meridurali (IMAM) manufactured the Ro.26 biplane, a basic trainer aircraft based on a design by aeronautical engineer Giovanni Galasso. It was powered by a seven-cylinder, 215-horsepower (160 kW) Armstrong Siddeley Lynx radial engine, built under licence by Alfa Romeo as the Lince. IMAM intended to market the new aircraft for basic pilot training and use in aerobatic competitions. The Ro.26′s design also allowed it to serve as a trainer for seaplane pilots by converting into a floatplane as the Ro.26I — or Ro.26 Idro ("Hydro") — with the landing gear replaced by floats. The prototype, registered as I-ABIL, flew for the first time in 1932.

== Design ==
The Ro.26 was a biplane trainer aircraft with equal-span wings with a slight upward cant. The wings and tail section were of all-wooden construction and covered with canvas. The fuselage was of all-metal construction, built with autogenously welded steel tubes.

The aircraft had fixed, wide-track rear tricycle landing gear with oil-elastic shock absorbers. A pair of floats could replace the landing gear in order to transform the aircraft into a floatplane. The open cockpits were arranged in tandem, with the instructor placed in the first cockpit, accessible from a door positioned on the right side of the fuselage. The pilot in the forward cockpit could engage and disengage the flight controls in flight at will.

The Alfa Romeo Lynx seven-cylinder, air-cooled engine was rated at 215 horsepower (160 kW) and drove a helical wooden two-bladed propeller that was 2.180 m (7 ft 1.8 in) in diameter.

== Operational history ==
At the beginning of 1934 the Regia Aeronautica (Italian Royal Air Force) tested the Ro.26 prototype I-ABIL. Although the aircraft displayed good flight characteristics, the military authorities decided not to buy it. IMAM abandoned plans for series production and built no additional examples.

== Variants ==
Ro.26
Biplane basic trainer, powered by a 215 hp (160 kW) Alfa Romeo Lynx 7-cylinder radial engine.
Ro.26I

The floatplane version had a maximum speed of 205 kilometres per hour (127 mph) and a stall speed of 82 kilometres per hour (51 mph), and could climb to 1,000 m (3,300 ft) in 3 minutes 20 seconds, to 2,000 m (6,600 ft) in 7 minutes, to 3,000 m (9,800 ft) in 13 minutes, to 4,000 m (13,000 ft) in 21 minutes 30 seconds, and to 5,000 m (16,000 ft) in 34 minutes. "I" stood for Idrovolanti ("seaplane").

== Operators ==
Kingdom of Italy

- IMAM

== Specifications (Ro.26) ==
Data from Jotti da Badia Polesine

General characteristics

- Crew: 2
- Length: 6.648 m (21 ft 10 in)
- Wingspan: 8.890 m (29 ft 2 in)
- Height: 2.685 m (8 ft 10 in)
- Wing area: 21.80 m^{2} (234.7 sq ft)
- Empty weight: 750 kg (1,653 lb)
- Gross weight: 900 kg (1,984 lb)
- Powerplant: 1 × Alfa Romeo Lynx 7-cylinder air-cooled engine, 160 kW (215 hp)
- Propellers: 2-bladed helical wooden propeller, 2.180 m (7 ft 2 in) diameter

Performance

- Maximum speed: 212 km/h (132 mph, 114 kn)
- Cruise speed: 186 km/h (116 mph, 100 kn)
- Stall speed: 78 km/h (48 mph, 42 kn) at 500 m (1,600 ft)
- Range: 1,000 km (620 mi, 540 nmi)
- Endurance: 5 hours 30 minutes
- Rate of climb: 7.4 m/s (1,460 ft/min)
- Wing loading: 43.5 kg/m^{2} (8.9 lb/sq ft)
