= IMAM Ro.57 =

Italian fighter/attack aircraft

Ro.57
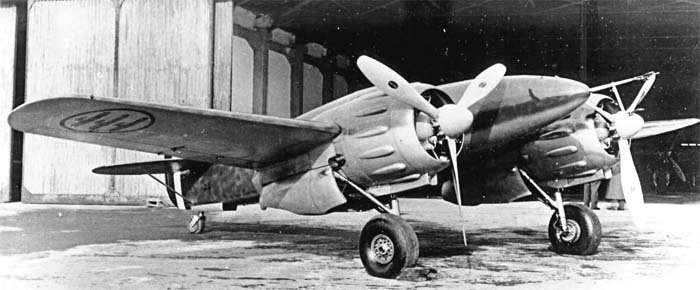
- The first IMAM Ro.57 prototype, MM-407

General information
- Type: Fighter, attacker
- National origin: Italy
- Manufacturer: Industrie Meccaniche e Aeronautiche Meridionali (IMAM)
- Designer: Giovanni Galasso
- Status: Retired
- Primary user: Regia Aeronautica
- Number built: 50 + 1 prototype

History
- Introduction date: 1943
- First flight: 1939
- Developed into: IMAM Ro.58

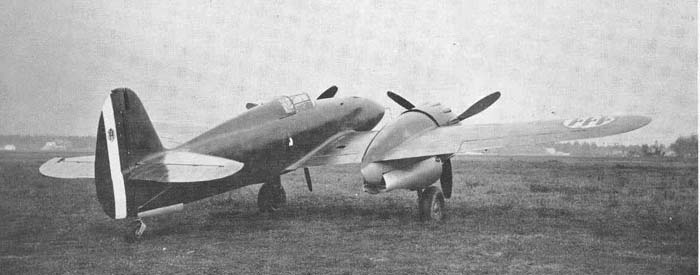
The first Ro.57 prototype, MM-407.

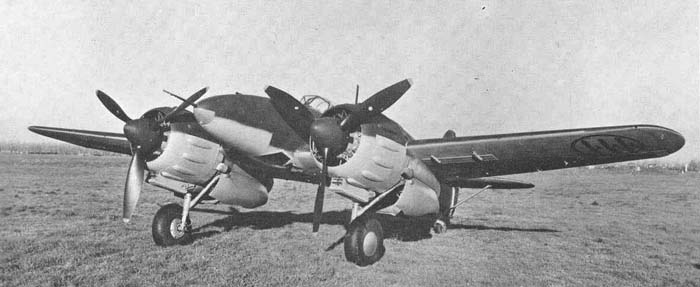
Ro.57bis

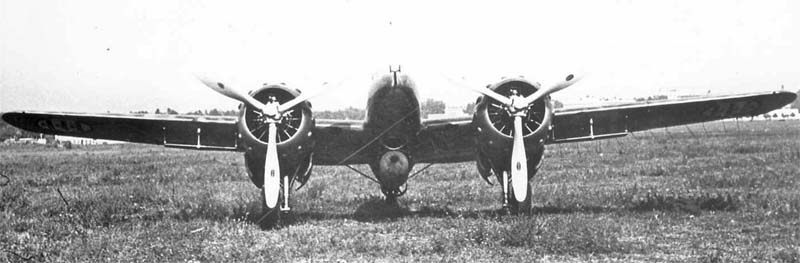
Ro.57bis

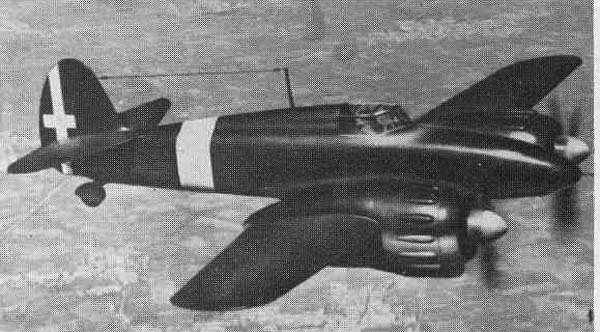
Ro.57bis

The IMAM Ro.57 was an Italian twin-engined, single-seat monoplane fighter of the Regia Aeronautica. Based on a 1939 design by Giovanni Galasso the aircraft did not enter production until 1943.

Two hundred aircraft were ordered, but only 50–75 were produced in two versions, one flown as an interceptor, the other in the role of a ground attack aircraft.

== Design and development ==
The Ro.57 was preceded by another twin engine fighter design, the Ro.53, which never entered production. The Ro.57 consisted of an all-metal, semi-monocoque fuselage with a steel skeleton and Duralumin structure. The wings were also Duralumin. It was powered by two 840 hp (630 kW) Fiat A.74 radial engines giving a maximum speed of 516 km/h, which in 1939 was faster than that of the main Italian fighter, the Macchi C.200 (504 km/h).

After testing at Guidonia it was proposed by IMAM for use as a dive bomber. This transformation, which involved the addition of dive brakes and provision for 500 kg bombs took time and delayed production. The resulting aircraft was designated the Ro.57bis. Performance dropped to 466 km/h maximum speed and to 350 km/h at cruise speed. The Ro.57bis was ordered into production in 1942 and entered service with the 97° Gruppo in 1943. About 50–60 aircraft were delivered.

It is said that the Ro.57 could have been the long range interceptor that Italy lacked throughout the war. It proved to be too costly for the limited weapons it carried and it never was assigned a clear role. A better-armed version with more powerful engines was developed as the Ro.58.

== Variants ==
Ro.57
Single-seat fighter with Fiat A.74 radial engines, and two 12.7 mm Breda-SAFAT machine guns
Ro.57bis
The dive bombing variant fitted with dive brakes, only one 12.7 mm Breda-SAFAT machine gun on the first 40 units built, increased to two on subsequent units, a crutch for bombs up to 2,205 lb (1,000 kg) under the fuselage and two hardpoint for bombs up to 353 lb (160 kg) under the wings.
Ro.57bis "Quadriarma"
A single unit (MM.75315) was equipped with what was to become the definitive armament, that is, two 12.7 mm Breda-SAFAT machine guns and two 20 mm autocannons.

== Operators ==
Kingdom of Italy

- Regia Aeronautica

== Specifications (Ro.57 Bis) ==
Data from Velivolo RO. 57 bimotore da bombardamento a tuffo

General characteristics

- Crew: 1
- Length: 8.83 m (29 ft 0 in)
- Wingspan: 12.5 m (41 ft 0 in)
- Height: 2.99 m (9 ft 10 in)
- Wing area: 23 m^{2} (250 sq ft)
- Aspect ratio: 6.79
- Empty weight: 3,490 kg (7,694 lb)
- Gross weight: 4,990 kg (11,001 lb)
- Powerplant: 2 × Fiat A.74 R.C.38 14-cylinder air-cooled radial piston engines, 627 kW (840 hp) each

Performance

- Maximum speed: 466 km/h (290 mph, 252 kn) at 5,000 m (16,000 ft)
- Cruise speed: 350 km/h (220 mph, 190 kn)
- Range: 930 km (580 mi, 500 nmi)
- Service ceiling: 8,850 m (29,040 ft)
- Time to altitude: 6,000 m (20,000 ft) in 9 min 45 s
- Wing loading: 217 kg/m^{2} (44 lb/sq ft)
- Power/mass: 0.25 kW/kg (0.15 hp/lb)

Armament

- Guns:

- 2 × 12.7 mm Breda-SAFAT machine guns (1 x 12.7 mm on the first 40 units built)

- Bombs: Up to 1000 kg (1100 lbs) of bombs

== See also ==
Aircraft of comparable role, configuration, and era

- Westland Whirlwind
- Grumman XP-50

Related lists

- List of aircraft of World War II
- List of fighter aircraft
- List of Regia Aeronautica aircraft used in World War II
