= IMAM Ro.58 =

Italian heavy fighter/attack aircraft prototype

Ro.58
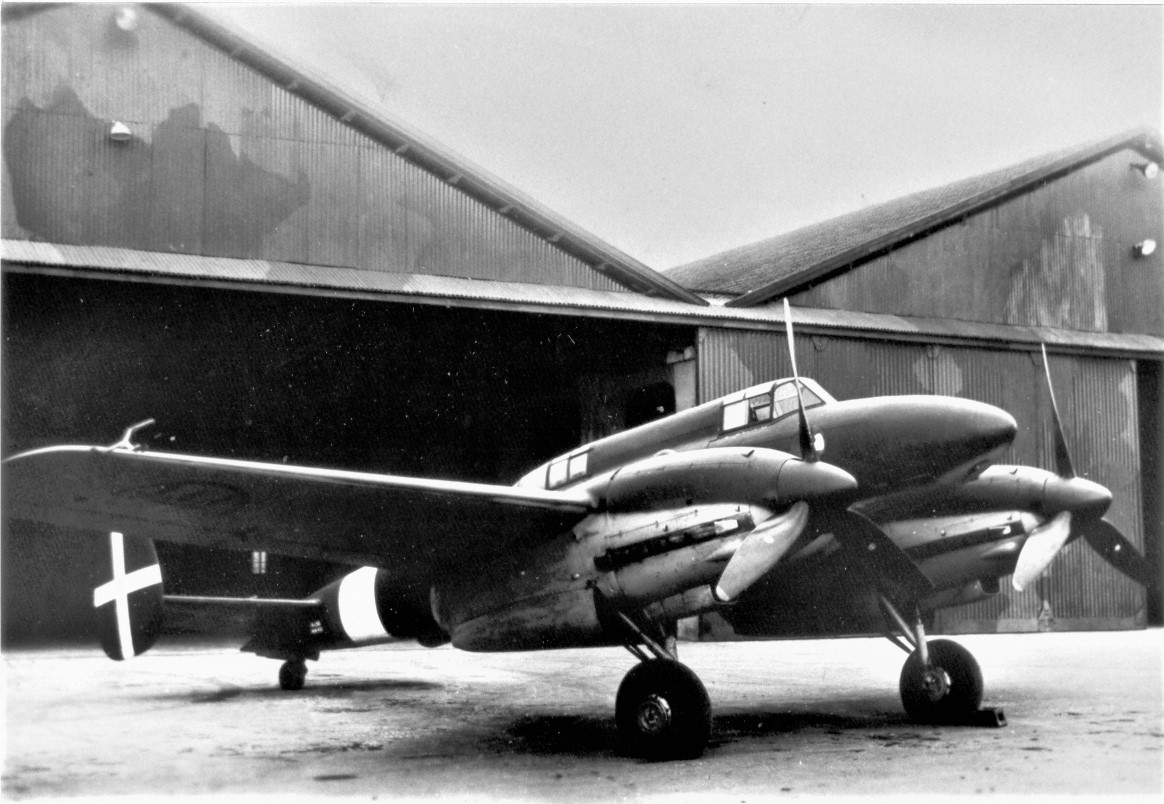
- Ro.58 prototype at Guidonia Montecelio airport

General information
- Type: Heavy Fighter/Ground Attack
- Manufacturer: Industrie Meccaniche e Aeronautiche Meridionali (IMAM)
- Designer: Giovanni Galasso
- Primary user: Regia Aeronautica
- Number built: 1

History
- First flight: May 1942
- Developed from: IMAM Ro.57

The IMAM Ro.58 was an Italian twin-engined, two-seat monoplane heavy fighter and attack aircraft, a development of the IMAM Ro.57. First flown in May 1942, it was considered a general improvement over its predecessor, mainly due to the substitution of higher power Daimler-Benz DB 601 engines for the Fiat A.74 engines used on the Ro.57. Initially it had many problems and during the maiden flight only the proficiency of the test pilot, Adriano Mantelli, saved the plane.

It was easily recognizable because it appeared to have a long hump over the fuselage (to accommodate two crew members as opposed to one in the Ro.57). The Ro.58 was a twin-tailed aircraft, in layout similar to the Messerschmitt Bf 110.

The performance of the aircraft with the DB 601 engines was much better than even many single engine fighters of the time (605 km/h at 5,000 m, 1,500 km endurance, 10,500 m ceiling).

More heavily armed than its predecessor, with five forward-firing MG 151s; three in the nose and two under the belly (the underbelly guns were not present during the first flight tests) and one 12.7 mm rear-facing Breda-SAFAT machine gun.

Tested alongside an Me 410 it was found to be superior, but even so it initially had its share of problems that delayed production. By the time it was refined it was too late for Italy, and there were no resources even for single-engine fighters, much less the more expensive twin-engined ones.

As with the Ro.57, which was not put into production in 1940 or 1941, the Ro.58, better armed and faster appeared only in May 1942, and too late to be produced in any numbers, as Italy surrendered to the Allies in September 1943.

== Specifications ==
One prototype only produced.

Data from Уголок неба — Ugolok Neba — "Sky Corner"

General characteristics

- Crew: Two
- Length: 9.89 m (32 ft 4 in)
- Wingspan: 13.40 m (43 ft 10 in)
- Height: 3.39 m (11 ft 1 in)
- Wing area: 26.2 m^{2} (282 sq ft)
- Aspect ratio: 6.85
- Empty weight: 4,350 kg (9,570 lb)
- Gross weight: 6,100 kg (13,420 lb)
- Powerplant: 2 × Daimler-Benz DB 601A-1 , 876 kW (1,175 hp) each

Performance

- Maximum speed: 605 km/h (378 mph, 328 kn)
- Range: 1,500 km (940 mi, 820 nmi)
- Service ceiling: 9,800 m (32,000 ft)
- Wing loading: 232.8 kg/m^{2} (47.7 lb/sq ft)
- Power/mass: 0.29 kW/kg (0.18hp/lb)

Armament

- 3 × fixed, forward-firing 20 mm MG 151 cannons in nose
- 2 × fixed, forward-firing 20 mm MG 151 cannons under belly
- 1 × flexible, rearward-firing 12.7 mm Breda-SAFAT machine gun in rear cockpit

== See also ==
Aircraft of comparable role, configuration, and era

- Bristol Beaufighter
- Messerschmitt Me 410

Related lists

- List of aircraft of World War II

== Bibliography ==
- Brotzu, Emilio (March 1972). Dimensione Cielo vol. 3 (in Italian). Rome: Edizioni Bizzarri.
- Lembo, Daniele (November 2003). "Officine Ferroviarie Meridionali IMAM". Aerei Nella Storia (in Italian) (34). Parma: Delta editions.
