= Cambilargiu Goliardia =

1920s Italian glider

Goliardia

General information
- Type: Competition glider
- National origin: Italy
- Manufacturer: Visco Brothers, Somma Lombardo
- Designer: Emanuele Cambilargiu
- Number built: 1

History
- First flight: 1924

The Cambilargiu Goliardia was an early Italian competition glider which took part in the first Italian international gliding contest, held at Asiago in 1924. Though outclassed by the German contestants' aircraft and their pilots' experience, it was the most successful Italian competitor, encouraging a national interest in the sport.

== Design and development ==
The Goliardia was one of the first post-World War I Italian competition gliders. It was a canvas-covered, all-wood-framed aircraft with a thick section, cantilever, rectangular plan wing. Its broad but short ailerons were at the tips. A pod and boom design, it had an open cockpit in a central nacelle which stretched from ahead of the wing leading edge to the trailing edge.

The tail booms, slender and rectangular in section, carried a cropped, rectangular plan tailplane with rectangular elevator. The similarly shaped fin and rudder, which operated above the elevator, was centrally positioned.

The Goliardia landed on long skids aligned with the booms, each mounted on a parallel pair of transverse V-struts. There were a long, curved tailskid on each boom ahead of the tailplane leading edge.

== Operational history ==
The Goliardia was designed to compete in the first Italian international glider contest, held in 1924 at Asiago. Originally planned to take place in August with the weather at its best, the date slipped to October as Italian competitors sought more time to complete their aircraft. By then the strong winds, relied on by these early gliders to generate hill lift, had dropped and the inexperienced Italian pilots struggled to compete with the Germans who, because of the post war restrictions on powered flight, had turned to gliding and came to Asiago with more refined designs and more experienced pilots.

There were 13 Italian contestants, of which the most successful were the Teichfuss Condor II, though it crashed during the contest, the Febo Paglierini and the Goliarda. These last two were flown by students of the University of Pavia. The Goliardia, initially piloted by Segré, made a series of flights with the longest lasting 126 s. In contrast, the Germans flew for 13-14 min. Nonetheless, the Goliardia achieved the best Italian glider performance to date and also, flown by Cattenéo set a national gain of height record of 9 m (30 ft), stimulating further design efforts and better glider piloting techniques.

== Specifications ==
Data from Pedrelli (2011) Alternative weights and estimated performance from j2mcl-planeurs

General characteristics

- Crew: One
- Length: 5.60 m (18 ft 4 in)
- Wingspan: 13.00 m (42 ft 8 in)
- Wing area: 24 m^{2} (260 sq ft)
- Aspect ratio: 7
- Empty weight: 100 kg (220 lb) or 55 kg (121 lb)
- Gross weight: 170 kg (375 lb) or 130 kg (290 lb)

Performance

- Maximum speed: 90 km/h (56 mph, 49 kn)
- Maximum glide ratio: 10
- Rate of sink: 0.9 m/s (180 ft/min) at 50 km/h (31 mph; 27 kn)
- Wing loading: 7 kg/m^{2} (1.4 lb/sq ft) or 5.56 kg/m^{2} (1.14 lb/sq ft)
