= Teichfuss Condor II =

1920s Italian glider

Condor II

General information
- Type: Competition glider
- National origin: Italy
- Designer: Luigi Teichfuss
- Number built: 1

History
- First flight: 1924

The Teichfuss Condor II was designed to compete in the first Italian glider contest, held at Asiago in 1924. It was bought on arrival by the official Italian organization as the FIDA TIPO LT N2 but was lost in a mid-contest crash.

== Design and development ==
Despite the reuse of the name, the 1924 Condor II was a very different design from either the 1920 Condor I or the 1926 Condor III, which were both primary trainers with uncovered, rectangular section girder fuselages. The Condor II was designed to compete in the first Italian international glider contest, held in 1924 at Asiago.

It was a wooden-framed, fabric-covered high wing aircraft. Its wing was rectangular in plan apart from blunted tips and ailerons which broadened out to the tips. Built around twin spars, the wing was mounted on top of the fuselage and braced to it with a parallel pair of struts between mid-span and the fuselage keel.

The fuselage had an oval section, with an open cockpit immediately ahead of the wing leading edge, and tapered strongly behind the wing to a conventional tail. The tailplane was mid-mounted with its leading edge braced to the rudder post, and was large and slightly swept, with elevators that increased in chord outboard. The Condor's quadrantal profile fin was small but carried a larger, more straight-edged, balanced rudder.

The Condor II landed on thin skids, each mounted on a pair of transverse V-struts. The outer ends of these were attached to the wing struts close to the fuselage where they were joined by external longitudinal members.

== Operational history ==
The Asiago contest was originally planned to take place in August with the weather at its best, the date slipped to October as Italian competitors sought more time to complete their aircraft. By then the strong winds, relied on by these early gliders to generate hill lift, had dropped and the inexperienced Italian pilots struggled to compete with the Germans who, because of the post war restrictions on powered flight, had turned to gliding and came to Asiago with more refined designs and more experienced pilots.

As the Italian contingent, organized by the F.I.D.A., assembled and saw the opposition, they realized would they be outclassed and immediately bought the Condor, their marking FIDA TIPO LT N2 on the tail making it one of their own though acknowledging Teichfuss with the LT. It was flown by Francisco Canavesi but there are no known records of its performance, only that its flights were ended by a crash which left its pilot seriously injured.

== Specifications ==
Data from Italian Vintage Sailplanes, Pedrielli (2011)

General characteristics

- Crew: one
- Length: 5.30 m (17 ft 5 in)
- Wingspan: 11 m (36 ft 1 in)
- Wing area: 18 m^{2} (190 sq ft)
- Aspect ratio: 6.7
- Empty weight: 80 kg (176 lb)
- Gross weight: 155 kg (342 lb)

== See also ==
Related lists

- List of gliders
