= Ambrosini Sagittario =

1953 Italian research aircraft

Sagittario
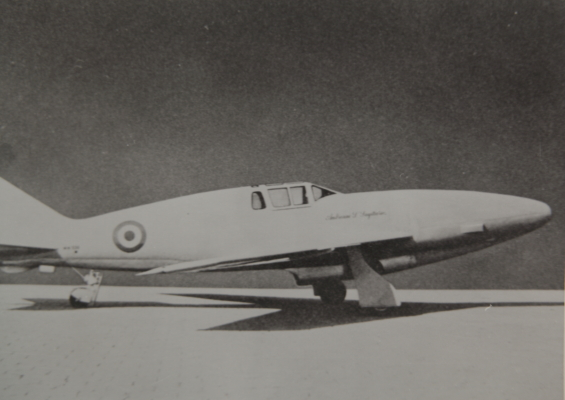

General information
- Type: Research aircraft
- Manufacturer: Ambrosini
- Number built: 1

History
- First flight: 5 January 1953
- Developed from: Ambrosini S.7
- Developed into: Aerfer Sagittario 2

The Ambrosini Sagittario was an Italian aerodynamic research aircraft based on the manufacturer's S.7.

== Development ==
New swept wings and tail surfaces of wooden construction were fitted to the S.7 fuselage. The wing leading edge was swept at 45 degrees. At first, the S.7's piston engine was retained and the aircraft was known as the Ambrosini S.7 Freccia (Arrow).

After several test flights in this configuration (the first on 5 January 1953), the piston engine was removed and replaced with a Turbomeca Marboré turbojet of 3.7 kN (840 lbf) thrust, and the aircraft renamed the Sagittario. The engine air inlet was in the extreme nose, and the exhaust was routed out the bottom of the fuselage, under the cockpit. The tail wheel undercarriage was retained, so special shielding was added to protect the tail wheel from the engine exhaust.

The later Aerfer Sagittario 2 differed in having a tricycle undercarriage and fully transparent cockpit glazing.

== Operators ==
Italy

- Italian Air Force operated the only aircraft for evaluation test

== Specifications ==
General characteristics

- Crew: one pilot
- Powerplant: 1 × Turbomeca Marboré turbojet , 3.7 kN (840 lbf) thrust

Performance

- Maximum speed: 560 km/h (350 mph, 300 kn)

== See also ==
Related development

- Ambrosini S.7
- Aerfer Sagittario 2
- Aerfer Leone
- Aerfer Ariete

Aircraft of comparable role, configuration, and era

- Yakovlev Yak-15

== Bibliography ==
- Buttler, Tony (2015). X-Planes of Europe. Vol. II: Military Prototype Aircraft from the Golden Age 1946–1974. Manchester, UK: Hikoki Publications. ISBN 978-1-90210-948-0.
- Taylor, Michael J. H. (1989). Jane's Encyclopedia of Aviation. London: Studio Editions. p. 57.
- Flight, 24 April 1953, pp. 508–509
