= Romeo Ro.35 =

General information
- Type: Single-seat glider
- National origin: Italy
- Manufacturer: Officine Mecchaniche Romeo, Naples
- Number built: 1

History
- First flight: 1933

The Romeo Ro.35, a.k.a. IMAM Ro.35 was a single-seat glider built in Italy in 1933.

== Design and development ==
Nicola Romeo was a 20th-century industrialist, remembered mostly through the Alfa-Romeo marque. In the early 1930s his aircraft were manufactured by Meridionali / IMAM - Industrie Meccaniche e Aeronautiche Meridonali, the aeronautical branch of Officine Ferroviarie Meridionali (English: Railway Workshops Meridionali) in Naples; the Ro.35 was constructed by the Officine Mecchaniche Romeo (Mechanical Workshops Romeo).

The Ro.35 was a cantilever high-wing monoplane with the wing mounted on top of the fuselage without dihedral. The one piece wing was built around a single spar and was plywood skinned forward of the spar forming a torsion-resistant D-box. The rest was fabric-covered. In plan the wing was straight-tapered and had rounded tips.

The Ro.35 had a simple rectangular cross-section, wooden framed fuselage, skinned with plywood forward and fabric aft. At the nose the sides curved around but the upper and lower surfaces did not meet, giving the Roma a square nosed side view. The open cockpit was set into the wing leading edge, the pilot protected by a small windscreen. Its rear fuselage tapered in plan to the tail, where a short, narrow fin supported a very curved, tall rudder. The tailplane was mounted on the fuselage at the foot of the fin. It too was narrow and with its elevator was straight-tapered and round tipped. The horizontal surfaces were fabric-covered; all the control surfaces were unbalanced. The curved lower rudder edge left clearance for elevator movement.

The glider was unusual in having the option of a fixed, narrow track wheeled undercarriage, with a steel axle passing through the lower fuselage. This could be discarded in favour of a more conventional skid. There was a small tail skid for use with either option.

The Ro.35 first flew in 1933 and the sole example was used by the Naples gliding club, operating from Capodichino. It also visited Poggio Renatico near Bologna.

== Specifications ==
Data from Pedrielli (2011) p.183

General characteristics

- Crew: One
- Length: 6.40 m (21 ft 0 in)
- Wingspan: 14.50 m (47 ft 7 in)
- Height: 1.20 m (3 ft 11 in)
- Wing area: 15.80 m^{2} (170.1 sq ft)
- Aspect ratio: 13.3
- Empty weight: 100 kg (220 lb)
- Gross weight: 170 kg (375 lb)

Performance

- Minimum control speed: 35 km/h (22 mph, 19 kn)
- Maximum glide ratio: estimated 11.2:1
- Wing loading: 10.8 kg/m^{2} (2.2 lb/sq ft)
