= Aerfer Ariete =

1958 Italian prototype fighter aircraft

Ariete
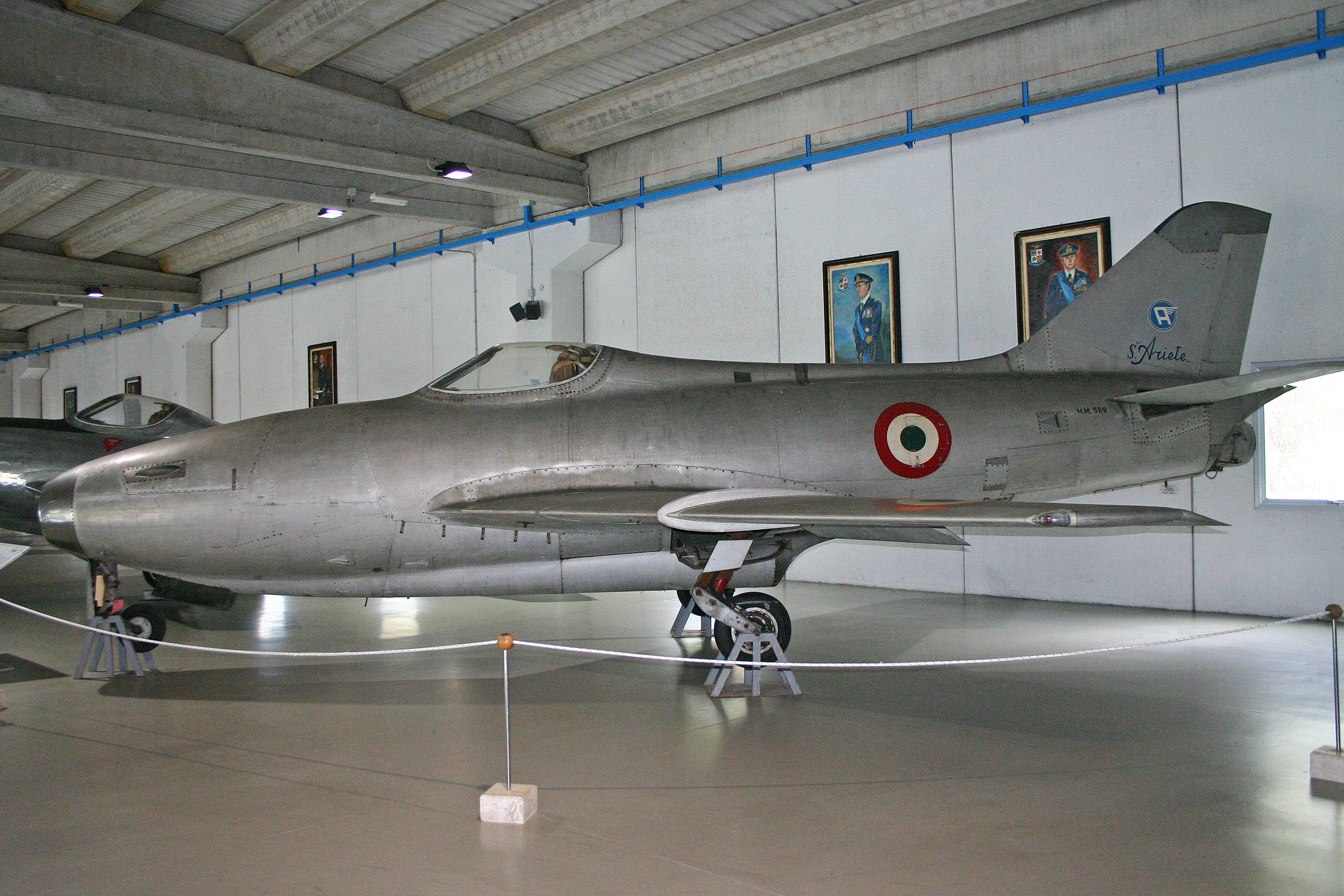

General information
- Type: Prototype fighter
- Manufacturer: Aerfer
- Designer: Sergio Stefanutti
- Primary user: Italian Air Force
- Number built: 2

History
- First flight: 27 March 1958
- Developed from: Aerfer Sagittario 2

The Aerfer Ariete (Italian for Ram or Aries) was a prototype fighter aircraft built in Italy in 1958. It was a refined derivative of the Aerfer Sagittario 2, and was an attempt to bring that aircraft up to a standard where it could be mass-produced as a viable combat aircraft.

Retaining most of the Sagittario 2's layout with a nose intake and ventral exhaust for the main Derwent engine, the Ariete added a Rolls-Royce Soar RS.2 auxiliary turbojet engine to provide additional power for climbing and sprinting. This used a dorsal, retractable intake with its exhaust at the tail.

No production ensued; a proposed version with a de Havilland Spectre rocket engine instead of the auxiliary turbojet, the Aerfer Leone (Lion or Leo), was abandoned before a prototype could be built.

== Operators ==
Italy

- Italian Air Force operated two aircraft for evaluation test

== Specifications (Ariete) ==
Data from Air Enthusiast, Jane's All the World's Aircraft 1958-59

General characteristics

- Crew: 1
- Length: 9.6 m (31 ft 6 in)
- Wingspan: 7.5 m (24 ft 7 in)
- Height: 3.28 m (10 ft 9 in)
- Wing area: 14.5 m^{2} (156 sq ft)
- Empty weight: 2,400 kg (5,291 lb)
- Gross weight: 3,535 kg (7,793 lb)
- Powerplant: 1 × Rolls-Royce Derwent 9 turbojet engine, 16.2 kN (3,600 lbf) thrust
- Powerplant: 1 × Rolls-Royce RSr.2 Soar turbojet engine, 8.025 kN (1,804 lbf) thrust

Performance

- Maximum speed: 1,125 km/h (699 mph, 607 kn)
- Maximum speed: Mach 1.1
- Service ceiling: 12,000 m (39,000 ft)
- Rate of climb: 227 m/s (44,700 ft/min)
- Time to altitude: 12,000 m (39,000 ft) in 4 minutes 20 seconds
- Wing loading: 244 kg/m^{2} (50 lb/sq ft)
- Thrust/weight: 0.685
- Take-off run: 500 m (1,600 ft)
- Landing run: 900 m (3,000 ft)

Armament

- Guns: 2 × 30 mm HS-825 cannon (30x136mm)

== See also ==
Related development

- Ambrosini S.7
- Ambrosini Sagittario
- Aerfer Sagittario 2
- Aerfer Leone

== Bibliography ==
- Buttler, Tony. X-Planes of Europe II: Military Prototype Aircraft from the Golden Age 1946–1974. Manchester, UK: Hikoki Publications, 2015. ISBN 978-1-90210-948-0
- Swanborough, Gordon. Air Enthusiast, Volume One. London: Pilot Press, 1971. ISBN 0-385-08171-5.
