= Ambrosini S.7 =

Italian racing aircraft

S.7
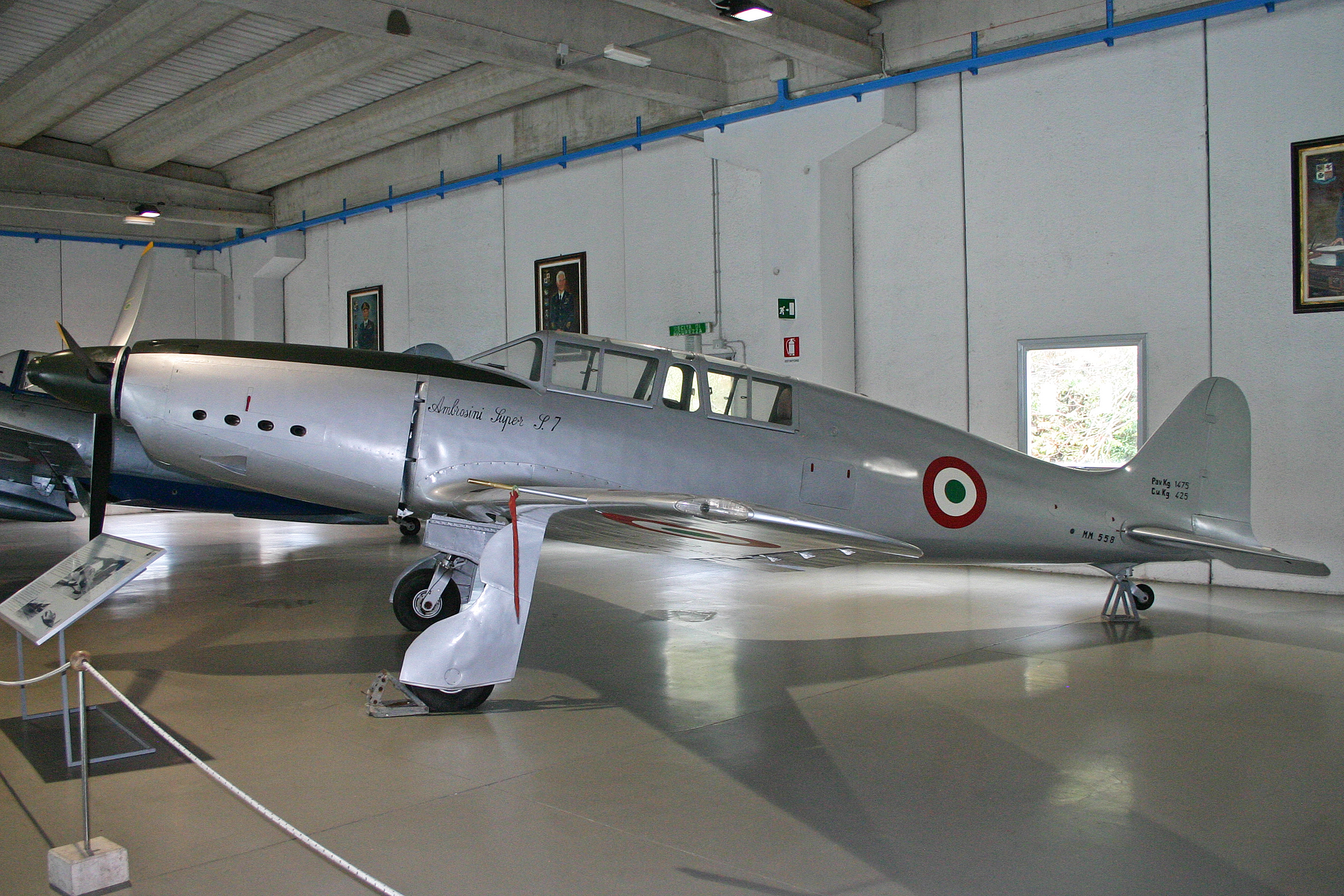

General information
- Type: Racing aircraft
- Manufacturer: Ambrosini
- Designer: Sergio Stefanutti
- Primary users: Regia Aeronautica Italian Air Force
- Number built: 10 + 2 prototypes SAI Ambrosini 7 (Wartime); 145 Ambrosini S.7 (Postwar)

History
- First flight: July 1939
- Variant: Ambrosini SAI.207
- Developed into: Ambrosini Sagittario

The Ambrosini SAI.7 was an Italian racing aircraft flown before World War II that entered production as a military trainer (designated simply S.7) after the war. It was of conventional configuration, constructed of wood, with a tail-wheel undercarriage. Power was provided by an air-cooled, inverted inline engine, the Alfa-Romeo model 115 with 225 horsepower.

== Development ==
The SAI.7 was built to compete in the IV Avioraduno del Littorio rally, which departed Rimini on 15 July 1939. As equipped for the race, the two SAI.7s were fitted with special glazed fairings extending from the canopy to the nose of the aircraft, to provide extra streamlining. The aircraft began their proving flights too late, and were disqualified from the competition, but on August 27, one of them set a new world airspeed record for a 100 km closed loop, which it completed at 403.9 km/h (251 mph) powered by a Hirth HM 508D.

During the war, the Regia Aeronautica expressed interest in the aircraft as a trainer for fighter pilots, and a slightly revised version entered limited production in 1943 as the SAI.7T. Only 10 were built, but in 1949, a modernised version powered by an Alfa Romeo engine was produced, 145 of them for the reformed Italian Air Force, including some single-seaters. On 21 December 1951, Leonardo Bonzi set new airspeed records in one over 100 km and 1000 km, at 367.36 km/h (228.27 mph) and 358.63 km/h (222.84 mph), respectively.

The final stage in the S.7's development was the Supersette (Super 7), two standard S.7s, one re-engined with a 380 hp de Havilland Gipsy Queen with a unique four-piece cowling that opened like a "flower petal", and the other with an Alfa Romeo 121. Both were modified and refined several times, and in the latter aircraft, Guidantonio Ferrari increased the international airspeed record for this category of aircraft to 419.482 km/h (260.65 mph) at Rome on December 3, 1952. Despite this, the air force was no longer interested in buying piston-engined trainers, and no further Supersettes were built. Both are preserved in museums.

An S.7 fuselage was also used as the basis for the Ambrosini Sagittario, which tested swept wing configurations.

== Variants ==
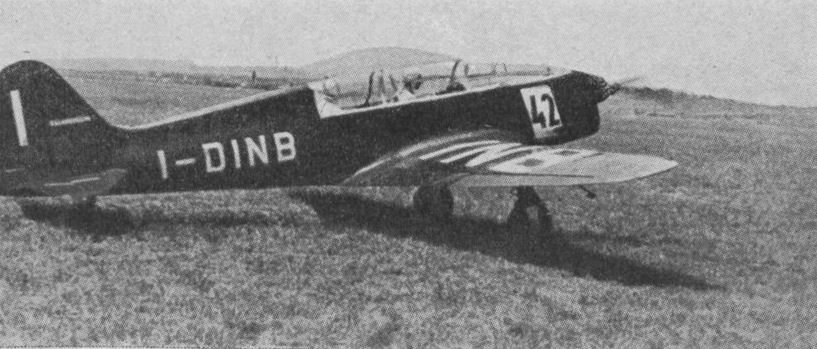
SAI Ambrosini 7 photo from L'Aerophile October 1939

SAI.7
original racing aircraft
SAI.7T
World War II trainer.
S.7
Post-war trainer, touring aircraft.
Super S.7 Supersette
Two prototypes of an improved, armed trainer.

== Operators ==
Kingdom of Italy
Regia Aeronautica - (Wartime) operated 10 SAI Ambrosini 7 delivered from August 1942 until August 1943
Italy
Aeronautica Militare Italiana - (Postwar) operated 145 Ambrosini S.7 until 1960s

== Specifications (S.7) ==
Data from The Encyclopedia of World Aircraft

General characteristics

- Crew: 2
- Length: 8.17 m (26 ft 10 in)
- Wingspan: 8.79 m (28 ft 10 in)
- Height: 2.8 m (9 ft 2 in)
- Wing area: 12.8 m^{2} (138 sq ft)
- Empty weight: 1,105 kg (2,436 lb)
- Max takeoff weight: 1,317 kg (2,903 lb)
- Powerplant: 1 × Alfa Romeo 115-ter 6-cylinder inverted air-cooled in-line piston engine, 168 kW (225 hp)
- Propellers: 2-bladed

Performance

- Maximum speed: 358 km/h (222 mph, 193 kn)
- Cruise speed: 264 km/h (164 mph, 143 kn) (econ.)
- Stall speed: 115 km/h (71 mph, 62 kn)
- Never exceed speed: 596 km/h (370 mph, 322 kn)
- Range: 1,000 km (620 mi, 540 nmi)
- Service ceiling: 5,250 m (17,220 ft)
- Rate of climb: 5.6 m/s (1,100 ft/min)

== See also ==
Related development

- Ambrosini Sagittario
- Aerfer Sagittario 2
- Aerfer Leone

Aircraft of comparable role, configuration, and era

- Miles Master
- North American T-6 Texan

Related lists

- List of aircraft of World War II
