= IMAM Ro.41 =

1934 Italian fighter and trainer aircraft

Ro.41
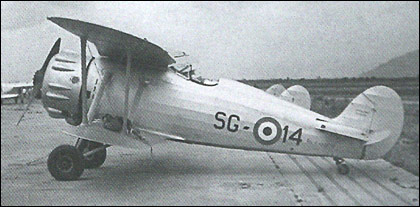

General information
- Type: Fighter/Trainer
- Manufacturer: IMAM
- Designer: Giovanni Galasso
- Primary users: Regia Aeronautica Luftwaffe
- Number built: 743 + 1 prototype

History
- Introduction date: 1935
- First flight: 16 June 1934
- Retired: 1950

The IMAM Ro.41 was an Italian light biplane fighter aircraft, serving in the Regia Aeronautica in the 1930s-1940s, mainly as a trainer.

It was a singular aircraft, being obsolescent as a fighter when it first appeared in 1934, but despite this it was used as such until 1940. The Luftwaffe showed an interest in it as a trainer, even though German first line fighters were completely different. The Ro.41 is almost unknown, compared to many other Italian aircraft, despite being one of the most numerous produced, in its 16-year career.

== Development ==
The IMAM Ro.41 had its origins in the aircraft division of OFM (Officine Ferroviarie Meridionali). In 1929 Alessandro Tonini, the chief designer, had serious health problems and was replaced by Giovanni Galasso. This company, based in Naples, was taken over by Breda in 1935, and so Galasso's new aircraft designs received the IMAM designation of this company. One of the first was the Ro.41, flight tested by Niccolò Lana at Capodichino airfield on 16 June 1934.

The first prototype was fitted with a Piaggio P.VII engine, and showed itself to be very agile, with excellent climb performance, and no noticeable vices. The second prototype, MM.281, was tested 31 January 1935, and taken on strength with the Regia Aeronautica.

The third prototype had a Piaggio P.VII C.45 with two-stage compressor, giving 390 hp at 4,000 m. This was the definitive version of this aircraft, and fifty aircraft, numbers MM.2907-2956, were ordered. This first series was put in service in July 1935.

== Design ==
A sesquiplane (i.e. a biplane with the lower wing smaller than the upper), the Ro.41 was of mixed construction, the fuselage of chrome-molybdenum steel frame, covered in fabric. Duralumin covered the bottom and upper fuselage, and also the engine cowling. The wings were made of wood covered with fabric. There was a fixed undercarriage.

The engine gave a theoretical 425 hp at ground level, 450 hp at 1,500 m, and 390 hp at 4,500 m, although it was much less in practice. The reliability was very good. A 176-litre fuel tank was inside the fuselage, near the engine, together with a 20-litre oil tank. The propeller was two-bladed and made of wood, later replaced by a metal two-blade model.

Armament, when fitted, consisted of two 7.7 mm Breda-SAFAT machine guns mounted inside the fuselage, with 850 cartridges.

== Performance ==
This aircraft was designed as a fighter, but was underpowered even by mid-1930s standards. It resembled a small I-15, and was fairly agile. On tests it was able to reach an altitude of 1,000 metres in 1 minutes 32 seconds, 3,000 m in 3 min 47 sec, and 5,000 m in 7 min 34 sec, which was a much better climb rate than the standard Italian fighter, the Fiat CR.32 (3,000 m in 5 min 10 sec). It was also more manoeuvrable than the CR.32, and cost significantly less. However, a top speed of only 320 km/h was far too slow to make the Ro.41 a credible fighter, and the CR.32 had a better range, a better dive performance, was more heavily armed, and was already in service.

== Operational service ==
The Ro.41 found a role as a trainer aircraft, for which it was well-suited, and a series of 30 two-seat aircraft first flew in 1937. The Ro.41 replaced the Breda Ba.25, and soon another 264 single-seat and 66 two-seat models were ordered.

The Ro.41 was also proposed as a light fighter. Twenty-eight were sent to Spain where, thanks to their high rate of climb, they acted as point-defence interceptors around Seville, though it appears that they did not score any victories.

It served in 5 and 50 Wing as a fighter bomber, before the Breda Ba.65 arrived. XVI Gruppo, 50 Stormo, had all its three squadrons equipped with Ro.41s. 163 Sqn was sent to Rodi and used the Ro.41 as a fighter until 1940. Twelve Ro.41s served with 160 Gruppo in 1939 and were used as first line fighters, though the Gruppo was based on CR.32s and CR.42s. From 10 August 1940 four Ro.41s of 159 Sqn, 12 Gruppo, 50 Assault Wing were flown from Tobruk as night fighters.

In its limited career as first line fighter the Ro.41 did not achieve any victories, and it is unlikely that it was ever involved in any air-combats. By this time even the CR.32 and CR.42s were obsolete, and the Ro.41s were only a stop-gap measure. Their real task was advanced training and despite the obsolete design they managed to be popular, reliable and cheap machines. They were also built by Agusta and AVIS.

The Ro.41bis, with a smaller wing and better performance was tested, but the CR.32 was already available for flying schools, and it was not a success. In September 1938 MM.3786 was sent to Uruguay to display the type, but no orders were placed.

Ro.41s were popular aircraft and for many years first line squadrons and flight schools operated it, until it became obsolete for first line use. One of the few changes was the fitting of a Piaggio P.VII RC.35 engine, that had a single-stage compressor which gave 500 hp at low level. Guns were seldom fitted, and two-seat versions had no weapons at all, and also carried less fuel.

Production numbered 726 aircraft by 1943. After the armistice the RSI's Aeronautica Nazionale Repubblicana operated some aircraft, and the Luftwaffe used them as trainers in Germany and France. Strangely no examples remained in Southern Italy, perhaps because flight schools, like Castiglione del Lago airfield, were in the central and northern Italy. Five ANR aircraft survived the war.

The Ro.41 was the first post-war aircraft to enter production when an order was sent to Agusta for 15 new aircraft (5 single and 10 two-seaters) and later ten more (7 single and 3 two-seaters). These aircraft had a wooden propeller, possibly spare parts still in store. They were painted silver, the new standard for Italian aircraft, instead of camouflage colours. Three of these machines formed the first acrobatic team of the Aeronautica Militare in 1947 at Padua. These aircraft were flown until 1950.

In total production reached 753 aircraft.

== Operators ==
Hungary

- Royal Hungarian Air Force

Kingdom of Italy

- Regia Aeronautica
- Aviazione Legionaria operated 25 IMAM Ro.41

Italy

- Italian Air Force operated some IMAM Ro.41 until 1952

Spain

- Spanish Nationalist Aviation
- Spanish Air Force

Germany

- Luftwaffe

== Specifications ==
General characteristics

- Crew: 1
- Length: 6.38 m (20 ft 11 in)
- Wingspan: 8.81 m (28 ft 11 in)
- Height: 2.65 m (8 ft 8 in)
- Wing area: 19.15 m^{2} (206.1 sq ft)
- Empty weight: 1,010 kg (2,227 lb)
- Gross weight: 1,270 kg (2,800 lb)
- Fuel capacity: 176 L (46 US gal; 39 imp gal)
- Powerplant: 1 × Piaggio Stella P.VII R.C.35 7-cylinder air-cooled radial piston engine, 335 kW (449 hp)
- Propellers: 2-bladed fixed-pitch wooden propeller

Performance

- Maximum speed: 320 km/h (200 mph, 170 kn) at 4,000 m (13,000 ft)
- Range: 320 km (200 mi, 170 nmi)

Armament

- Guns: 2 × 7.7 mm Breda-SAFAT machine guns

== See also ==
Related lists

- List of Interwar military aircraft
- List of Regia Aeronautica aircraft used in World War II
