= Filippo Zappi =

Italian diplomat

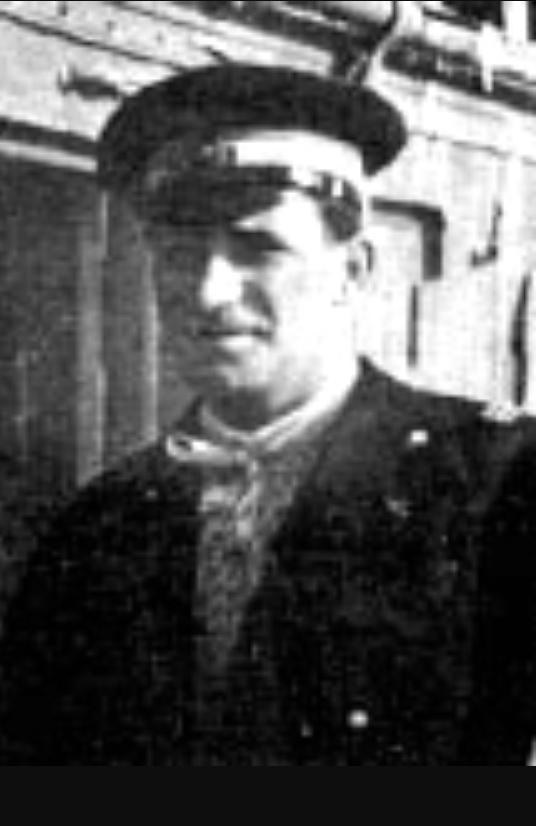
- An image of Filippo Zappi (1928)

9th Podestà of Italian concession of Tianjin
- In office 1932–1938
- Preceded by: Luigi Neyrone
- Succeeded by: Ferruccio Stefenelli

Personal details
- Born: 25 November 1896 Mercato Saraceno
- Died: 3 July 1961 (aged 64) Udine
- Party: National Fascist Party
- Profession: Soldier, explorer and diplomat

Military service
- Allegiance: Kingdom of Italy (1909–1943); Italian Social Republic (1943–1945); Italian Republic (1945–1961)
- Ambassador from Republic of China; Federal State of Austria; Portugal; Saudi Arabia; Finland

Filippo Zappi (Mercato Saraceno, 25 November 1896 – Udine, 3 July 1961) was a soldier, explorer and Italian diplomat.

== Biography ==
Filippo Zappi was born in Mercato Saraceno on 25 November 1896 to a middle-class wealthy family who later transferred on in Florence, where Filippo would study in the prestigious Alla Querce dei Padri Barnabiti College.

In 1909 he was admitted into the Italian Naval Academy of Livorno and in 1912 he participated in the Italo-Turkish War; in 1915 he was nominated Guardes de la Marine and he was given the rank of General Staff of the Navy.

In 1916, he obtained a pilot's license and certification for airships, being put in command of the Jesi p base. He fought in World War I and was awarded the Bronze Medal of Military Valor in 1918, as well as getting a rank promotion to Lieutenant for his war achievements. In 1927, he was promoted for "special merits" to corvette captain, under the direct jurisdiction of the Italian State.

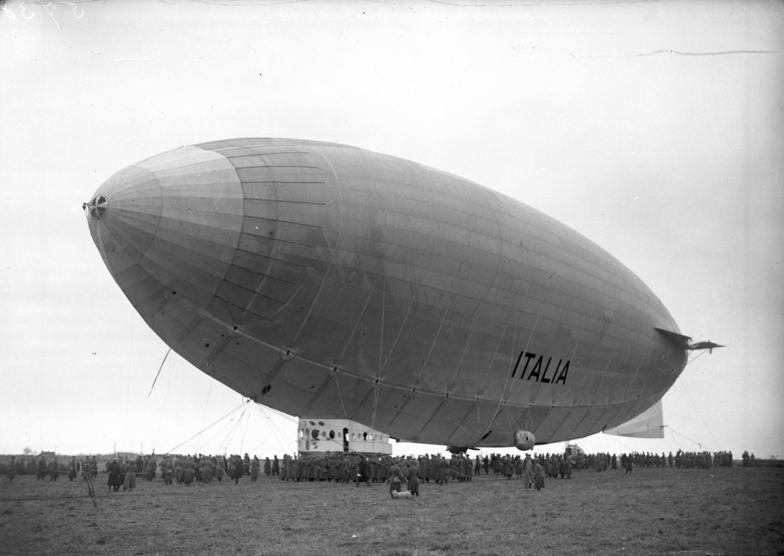
The Italia airship in Słupsk, Pomerania.

In 1928, he participated, as a weapon system officer, in the North Pole expedition of the Italia airship under the command of Italian general Umberto Nobile , who wanted him as a navigation officer of the crew. He departed from Ciampino Air Base on 19 March 1928. The Italian airship then stopped in the Biaggio Air Base before heading towards the Svalbard Islands, which it reached on 6 May. After two explorative flights on the northeastern coast of Greenland, Franz Joseph Land and Severnaya Zemlya, on 24 May at 00:24 GMT, the expedition reached the North Pole, followed by celebrations which included the launch of an Italian flag, a wooden crucifix donated by Pope Pius XI , and the medal of the Virgin Mary of Forlì. Due to strong winds, some scientists couldn't land on the pack ice. This also complicated the return of the airship as the weather conditions made flying difficult until the plane dropped significantly in altitude. To avoid impact with the pack ice, the engines were shut down, attempts were made to release the heavy ballast chain, and many heavy loads were thrown overboard. Inevitably, the airship Italia impacted first with its stern, then with its mooring mast, causing the command vessel to separate. In the crash, ten men were left on the pack ice, including Filippo Zappi. The survivors went to the Red Tent. On 30 May 1928, Adalberto Mariano, Filippo Zappi and Finn Malmgren decided to walk the entire day to Ny-Ålesund to search for help even though Umberto Nobile firmly opposed the idea. The walk was difficult, and on 15 or 16 June, Malmgren collapsed due to injuries, after which he asked to be left behind. On 10 July, the Soviet pilot Boris Chukhnovsky spotted the Filippo Zappi and Adalberto Mariano during a reconnaissance flight, as well as the corpse of the Swedish scientist. On 12 July, the Soviet icebreaker Krassin rescued them. The corpse of Malmgren, despite being spotted on 10 July, was never found again, possibly due to falling into the Arctic Ocean after the melting of the ice. The engineer Felice Trojani stated that Filippo Zappi allegedly told him that he had "waited for Mariano to be dead to eat his brain and continue his march towards Ny-Alesund". This testimony was received by journalists who were on board the Krassin and opened up debate on whether or not Zappi, who was more well fed and in better health conditions than Adalberto Mariano upon their rescue, had participated in acts of cannibalism on the body of Malmgren.

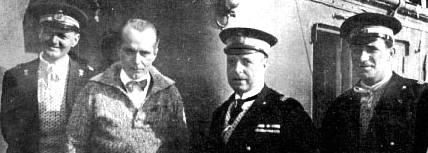
From left to right: Adalberto Mariano, Umberto Nobile, Giuseppe Romagna, Filippo Zappi.

After the expedition Zappi moved on to a diplomatic career becoming the Italian consul in China in 1929, being put in charge of the Italian concession of Tianjin. After that, he worked for the Italian embassy in the Federal State of Austria, and later on in the one in Portugal. After that he was also appointed in Saudi Arabia before being sent to his final diplomatic destination, Finland, in 1944.

In the aftermath of World War II Filippo Zappi remained a diplomat and on 12 September 1953 became the Extraordinary and Plenipotentiary Minister at the Italian Embassy in Helsinki.

Filippo Zappi died suddenly on 3 July 1961 during his stay in a diplomatic delegation held in Udine. He was buried with state honours in the Zappi family grave located in Mercato Saraceno, his hometown.

Filippo Zappi is one of the main characters of the 1969 movie "The Red Tent", directed by Georgian film director Michail Konstantinovič Kalatozov. The actor Luigi Vannucchi plays the role of Zappi.

Filippo Zappi, after his expedition to the North Pole on the Italia airship, married Laure-Jeanne LeCoultre on 4 March 1929 in Lausanne, Switzerland. She was the daughter of the famous manufacturer Jaeger-LeCoultre. Some of the crew from the Arctic expedition were also witnesses to his marriage, including Adalberto Mariano and Umberto Maddalena. Once he was nominated as consul in Hankou, he moved there with his wife. In October 1930, Laure-Jeanne LaCoultre gave birth to her daughter Laurette Zappi. However, due to post-partum complications, she died three days later. Laure-Jeanne LeCoultre was buried in Hankou; three years later, her remains were transferred to Switzerland; after that, Zappi was moved from his post and relocated to Harbin in 1931, during the puppet regime of Manchukuo, where he remained in up until 1933.

== Awards ==
Grande Ufficiale Ordine al Merito della Repubblica Italiana - ribbon for ordinary uniform

Grande Ufficiale Ordine al Merito della Repubblica Italiana
— 2 giugno 1958. Di iniziativa della presidenza del Consiglio dei Ministri.

Grand Officer of the Order of Merit of the Italian Republic - ribbon for ordinary uniform

Grand Officer of the Order of Merit of the Italian Republic
— 2 June 1958 On the initiative of the Presidency of the Council of Ministers.

Medaglia di bronzo al valore militare - ribbon for ordinary uniform

Medaglia di bronzo al valore militare
"Comandante di dirigibile esploratore ha eseguito numerosissime missioni di guerra per la difesa litoranea in zona esposta ad offese nemiche, per la massima parte in ore notturne, dimostrando sempre nel comando dell'aeronave e nelle condotta delle operazioni mirabile spirito guerresco. Come più elevato in grado dei sottordini, ha sempre egregiamente coadiuvato il suo comandante di squadriglia e di aeroscalo rendendo preziosi servigi e dimostrando ottime qualità militari, specialmente in occasione di incursione aerea di eccezionale intensità sull'aeroscalo."
— Alto Adriatico, novembre 1917, novembre 1918

Order of Brilliant Jade - ribbon for ordinary uniform

Order of Brilliant Jade
"Given during his tenure as podestà of Tianjin"

== Monuments in his name ==
A bronze statue showcasing Adalberto Mariano, Finn Malmgren and Filippo Zappi is located in Stockholm to commemorate the expedition to the North Pole and mourn the death of the Swedish scientist.

In his hometown, Mercato Saraceno, a secondary school was named after him. His hometown also dedicated a bronze bust made by engineer Ilario Fiorvanti, the same individual who constructed the secondary school.

== See also ==
- Italia (airship)
- Umberto Nobile
- Finn Malmgren
- The Red Tent (film)
- Red Tent

== Bibliography ==
- Umberto Nobile, Gli italiani al Polo Nord, Ed. Mondadori 1959 - Milano
- Umberto Nobile, Storia aggiornata della spedizione dell'Italia, Ed. Staderini 1962 - Roma
- Umberto Nobile, La Tenda Rossa, memorie di neve e fuoco, Ed. Mondadori 1972 - Milano
- Umberto Nobile, Posso dire la verità. Storia inedita della spedizione polare dell’Italia, Ed. Mondadori 1945, Milano
- Alfredo Viglieri, 48 giorni sul pack, Ed. Mondadori 1929, Milano
- Felice Trojani, La coda di Minosse, Ed. Mursia 1969 - Milano
- Silvio Zavatti, Al Polo Nord in dirigibile, Ed. Carroccio 1961, San Lazzaro di Savena
- S. Saccone, Il contributo di Filippo Zappi alla scoperta del Polo Nord, in Miscellanea di Storia delle esplorazioni, 12, Ed. Bozzi 1987 - Genova, pp. 261-272
- Le esplorazioni: i grandi navigatori del mare, dell’aria e dello spazio. Le esplorazioni polari e Filippo Zappi, Ed. Il Ponte Vecchio 1998, Cesena
- G. Biagi, Biagi racconta: i miracoli della radio nella tragedia polare, A. Mondadori, Milano 1929
- G. Biagi Jr., G. Unia, Ritorno al Polo Nord. La Tenda Rossa 2.0, Ed. Nerosubianco 2019, Cuneo
