= Fiat G.12 =

Italian transport aircraft of World War II

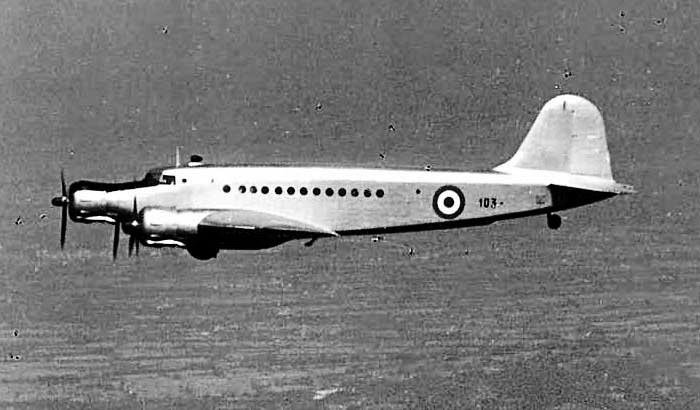
- Fiat G.12

General information
- Type: Civil airliner & military transport
- Manufacturer: Fiat
- Designer: Giuseppe Gabrielli
- Primary users: Regia Aeronautica Luftwaffe; Royal Hungarian Air Force
- Number built: 104

History
- Manufactured: 1941-1944
- Introduction date: 1941
- First flight: 15 October 1940
- Retired: 1956

The Fiat G.12 was an Italian transport aircraft of World War II.

== Design and development ==
The G.12 was an all-metal low-wing cantilever personnel transport aircraft. It had three radial engines, one mounted on the nose and the other two in wing-mounted nacelles. The engines drove three-blade feathering metal propellers. The mainwheels of its landing gear retracted into the nacelles; the tailwheel was fixed. The flight deck and cabin were fully enclosed. Access was via a portside access door aft of the wing.

The G.12 was designed as a civil aircraft, but served mainly in military roles during the war. Only a limited number were built, some as late as 1944, after the Italian armistice. The G.12 inspired the postwar G.212 "Flying Classroom", the last Italian three-engine transporter. It had a crew of four.

== Variants ==
G.12C
14-passenger transport aircraft, powered by three 574 kW (770 hp) Fiat A.74 R.C.42 radial engines.
G.12 Gondar
Long-range cargo transport aircraft.
G.12GA
Long-range transport aircraft, fitted with extra fuel tanks. Three built.
G.12RT
Special long-range version, built to fly between Rome and Tokyo. One built.
G.12RTbis
One built.
G.12T
Troop and cargo transport aircraft.
G.12CA
18-passenger commercial airliner, powered by three Alfa Romeo 128 radial engines.
G.12L
22-passenger commercial airliner.
G.12LA
22-passenger commercial airliner, powered by three Alfa Romeo 128 radial engines.
G.12LB
22-passenger commercial airliner, powered by three 604 kW (810 hp) Bristol Pegasus 48 radial engines.
G.12LP
22-passenger commercial airliner, powered by three 793 kW (1,065 hp) Pratt & Whitney R-1830-S1C3-G Twin Wasp radial engines.

== Operators ==
=== Military operators ===
Germany

- Luftwaffe

Hungary

- Royal Hungarian Air Force operated 12 aircraft

Kingdom of Italy

- Regia Aeronautica

Italy

- Italian Air Force operated some aircraft until 1956

=== Civil operators ===
Kingdom of Italy

- Avio Linee Italiane

Italy

- Ali Flotti Riunite
- Alitalia-Linee Aeree Italiane

== Specifications ==
Data from World Encyclopedia of Military Aircraft

General characteristics

- Crew: 4
- Capacity: 14 troops or 24 civilians
- Length: 20.1 m (65 ft 11 in)
- Wingspan: 28.6 m (93 ft 10 in)
- Height: 4.9 m (16 ft 1 in)
- Wing area: 113 m^{2} (1,220 sq ft)
- Empty weight: 9,420 kg (20,768 lb)
- Gross weight: 15,000 kg (33,069 lb)
- Powerplant: 3 × Fiat A.74 R.C.42 14-cylinder air-cooled radial piston engines, 574 kW (770 hp) each
- Propellers: 3-bladed constant-speed propellers

Performance

- Maximum speed: 390 km/h (240 mph, 210 kn) at 5,000 m (16,000 ft)
- Cruise speed: 303 km/h (188 mph, 164 kn)
- Range: 2,300 km (1,400 mi, 1,200 nmi)
- Service ceiling: 8,500 m (27,900 ft)

Armament

- Guns: 2 × 7.7 mm (.303 in) Breda-SAFAT machine guns

== See also ==
Related development

- Fiat G.212

Aircraft of comparable role, configuration, and era

- Junkers Ju 52
- Douglas DC-3
- SM.79 Sparviero
- Savoia-Marchetti SM.81

Related lists

- List of aircraft of World War II

== Bibliography ==
- Angelucci, Enzo The World Encyclopedia of Military Aircraft. London:Jane's Publishing, 1981. ISBN 0-7106-0148-4.
- Angelucci, Enzo The World Encyclopedia of Military Aircraft, London, 1987.
- de Marchi, Italo (Oct 1982). "Les Fiat G. 12: 1^{re} période: avant et pendant la guerre" [Fiat G. 12: The 1st Period before and during the War]. Le Fana de l'Aviation (in French) (155): 50–59. ISSN 0757-4169.
- Stroud, John. European Transport Aircraft since 1910. London: Putnam, 1966.
- Stroud, John. "Post War Propliners : Fiat G.12 and G.212". Aeroplane Monthly. Volume 23 No. 1, January 1994. London: IPC. Page 64-68.
