= Aeronautica Umbra Trojani AUT.18 =

Italian fighter prototype

AUT.18
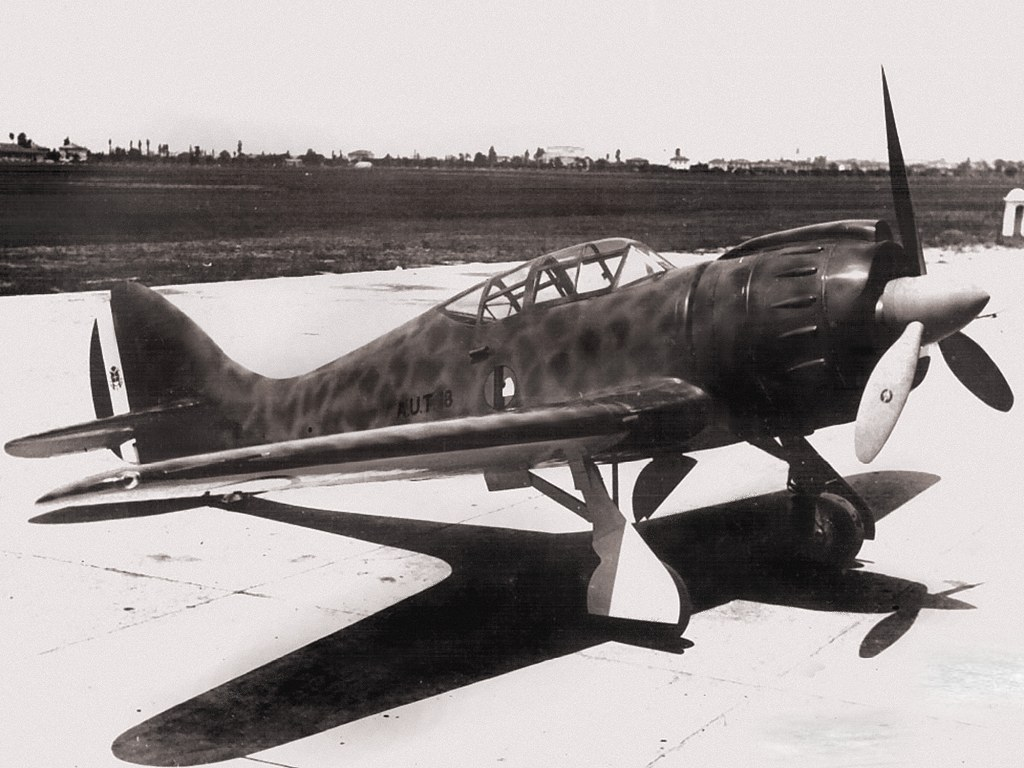

General information
- Type: Fighter
- National origin: Italy
- Manufacturer: Aeronautica Umbra
- Designer: Felice Trojani
- Number built: 1

History
- First flight: 22 April 1939

The AUT.18 was a prototype fighter aircraft developed in Italy by Aeronautica Umbra shortly before the outbreak of World War II. It was designed in 1934 by Felice Trojani, who at that time was collaborating with Umberto Nobile on the Arctic flights of the airships Norge and Italia. The aircraft's designation came from initials of the manufacturer, the surname of the designer, and the aircraft's wing area (18 m^{2}), the sole prototype receiving the serial no. M.M.363.

== Design & Development ==
Born from the same Regia Aeronautica requirement that spawned the Caproni-Vizzola F.5, FIAT G.50, Macchi C.200, Meridionali Ro 51 and Reggiane Re 2000 fighters, the A.U.T.18 flew for the first time on 22 April 1939, powered by a 779 kW (1,044 hp) Fiat A.80 R.C.41 radial engine. The fighter had an all-metal stressed-skin structure, covered in duralumin, featuring an inwardly-retracting undercarriage and retractable tail-wheel and was armed with two 12.7 mm (0.50 in) Breda-SAFAT machine-guns mounted in the wings just outboard of the undercarriage.

Flight trials proved disappointing and lagged behind the other fighters in Progetto R - the modernisation (riammodernamento) of the Regia Aeronautica. With no production orders forthcoming, despite the prototype being returned to the Umbra factory at Foligno for modifications on 20 February 1940 and a second flight test series from 5 November 1940, no improvement was demonstrated over fighters already in production so the A.U.T.18 was abandoned.

== Operational history ==
After delivery to the Regia Aeronautica on 5 November 1940 the fate of the prototype is not known, possibly being transferred to Germany for evaluation, it was also rumoured to have been captured by British forces, but it is more likely that it was destroyed in a raid after its transfer to Orvieto.

== Specifications (AUT.18) ==
General characteristics

- Crew: 1
- Length: 8.56 m (28 ft 1 in)
- Wingspan: 11.5 m (37 ft 9 in)
- Height: 2.88 m (9 ft 5 in)
- Wing area: 18.70 m^{2} (201 sq ft)
- Empty weight: 2,320 kg (5,110 lb)
- Gross weight: 2,975 kg (6,560 lb)
- Powerplant: 1 × Fiat A.80 R.C.41 , 780 kW (1,044 hp)

Performance

- Maximum speed: 480 km/h (300 mph, 260 kn)
- Range: 800 km (500 mi, 430 nmi)
- Service ceiling: 10,000 m (32,800 ft)

Armament

- 2 × 12.7 mm (0.50 in) Breda-SAFAT machine guns

== See also ==
Aircraft of comparable role, configuration, and era

- Fiat G.50
- Macchi MC.200
- Reggiane Re.2000
