= 1948 Keerbergen Fiat G.212 crash =

1948 aviation accident

1948 Keerbergen Fiat G.212 airplane crash
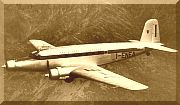
- A Fiat G.212 of Avio Linee Italiane similar to the incident aircraft

Accident
- Date: 1 July 1948
- Site: Keerbergen, Belgium

Aircraft
- Aircraft type: Fiat G.212PW
- Operator: Linee Aeree Italiane
- Registration: I-ELSA
- Flight origin: Milano-Linate Airport, Italy
- Destination: Brussels-Zaventem Airport, Belgium
- Passengers: 7
- Crew: 5
- Fatalities: 8
- Survivors: 4

On 1 July 1948 the Avio Linee Italiane Fiat G.212PW “I-ELSA” was an international scheduled passenger flight from Linate Airport, Milan, Italy to Zaventem Airport, Brussels, Belgium. The airplane crashed during an emergency landing at 12:20pm local time. Eight of the twelve people on board were killed.

== Flight and crash ==
The Avio Linee Italiane Fiat G.212PW “I-ELSA” departed in the morning of 1 July 1948 from Milan-Linate Airport, Italy for its flight to Brussels-Zaventem Airport, Belgium. It was the first time a Fiat airplane was flying this destination, before that time a Douglas D.C.3 flown this route. The aircraft was new and had made only 19 flight hours.

At 11:50 am local time, the pilot contacted the regional control centre at Beauvais in Belgium. The weather condition was cloudy with a visibility of only 100 metres. Due to the poor visibility, the flight crew was not able to locate the airport. The pilot would have tried a few times unsuccessfully to make an emergency landing. Apparently they located the private airfield of Keerbergen. The aircraft circled the airfield. During the landing the airplane hit treetops of the forest 500 meters from the runway, crashed and caught fire.

== Victims ==
Four passengers and four crew members died in the crash. Two people were Belgians. The 22-year-old stewardess and three passengers were thrown out of the airplane and survived the disaster.

== Investigation ==
The conclusion of the investigation was that the pilot decided to make an emergency landing due to the bad weather conditions and the failure of both the radio communication equipment and radio navigation equipment, at another airport. To be able to land at the beginning of the runway the pilot flew a steep turn by tilting the left wing of the plane so that the roll angle put the aircraft at stall speed at low altitude.
