= CANT Z.506 Airone =

Italian patrol floatplane

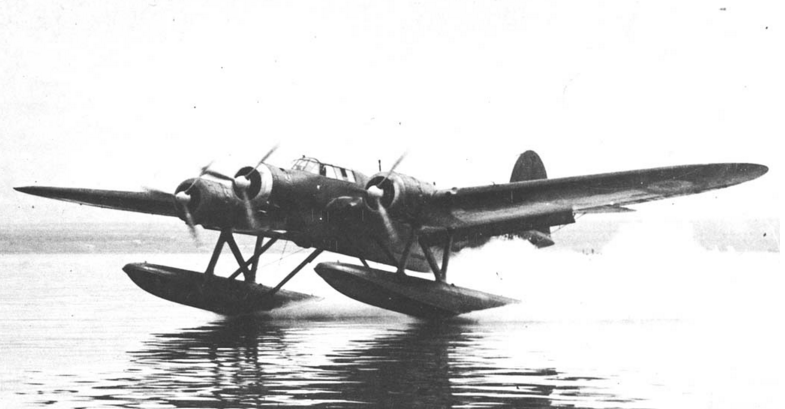

General information
- Type: Patrol aircraft
- Manufacturer: CANT
- Designer: Filippo Zappata
- Primary user: Regia Aeronautica
- Number built: Z.506B 314 + 2 prototypes Z.506C 40

History
- Introduction date: 1936
- First flight: 19 August 1935
- Retired: 1959
- Variant: CANT Z.1007
- Developed into: CANT Z.509

The CANT Z.506 Airone (Italian: Heron) was a trimotor floatplane designed and produced by the Italian aircraft manufacturer CANT. By some metrics, it was the largest floatplane to see service during the Second World War.

Derived from the larger Z.505 seaplane during the first half of the 1930s, the Z.506 was designed to serve in the transport role, seating up to 14 occupants. Despite possessing a wooden structure, it was capable of operating on relatively rough seas. On 19 August 1935, the prototype performed its maiden flight. One year later, the initial production model, Z.506A, commenced delivery. A key early customer was the Italian airline Ala Littoria, which operated its Z.506 fleet as a transport and postal aircraft across its Mediterranean routes. In its early years, the type established several records, such as the setting of 10 world records in 1936 as well as a further 10 records during the following year.

Spurred by this success, CANT opted to develop several models and derivatives of the aircraft, such as the Z.509, which was effectively an enlarged version of the Z.506A. Another model was the Z.506S, a specialised air-sea rescue aircraft; numerous aircraft continued to be operated into well into the postwar era, with some Z.506Ss remaining in service as late as 1959. Seeking to expand outside of the civil sector, the company developed the militarised Z.506B during the late 1930s; operated by numerous military air services during the 1940s, the Z.506B was produced in greater quantity than any other model.

The combat debut of the type took place during the Spanish Civil War, where it was used as a reconnaissance aircraft and torpedo bomber. During Italy's involvement in the Second World War, the Z.506 was frequently used in a variety of roles, including for aerial reconnaissance, torpedo bombing, maritime patrol and air-sea rescue operations by both the Regia Aeronautica and Regia Marina. As the conflict progressed, it would also be flown in quantity by the Aeronautica Cobelligerante del Sud, Aeronautica Nazionale Repubblicana and the Luftwaffe. It proved to be particularly vulnerable when intercepted by Allies fighters, thus the type was increasingly used on secondary duties during the latter half of the conflict. The militarised Z.506B has been considered to be one of the best floatplanes ever built.

== Design and development ==
The CANT Z.506 was designed as a 12 to 14-seat transport twin-float floatplane; it was initially powered by three Piaggio Stella P.IX radial engines, each one capable of producing up to 455 kW (610 hp). It was derived from the larger and heavier Z.505 seaplane. On 19 August 1935, the prototype performed its maiden flight.

During 1936, the initial production variant of the aircraft, the Z.506A, entered quantity production; in comparison to the prototype, the initial production model was furnished with more powerful Alfa Romeo 126 RC.34 nine cylinder radial engines, which produced up to 560 kW (750 hp) typically as well as a maximum output of 780 CV on takeoff and 750 CV at 3,400 meters. The aircraft was produced at the "Cantieri Riuniti dell 'Adriatico" and "Cantiere Navale Triestino" (CRDA CANT) factories in Monfalcone and Finale Ligure respectively. Demand for the Z.506 was quickly proved to be large enough that another Italian aircraft manufacturer, Piaggio, also established a production line for the type under licence.

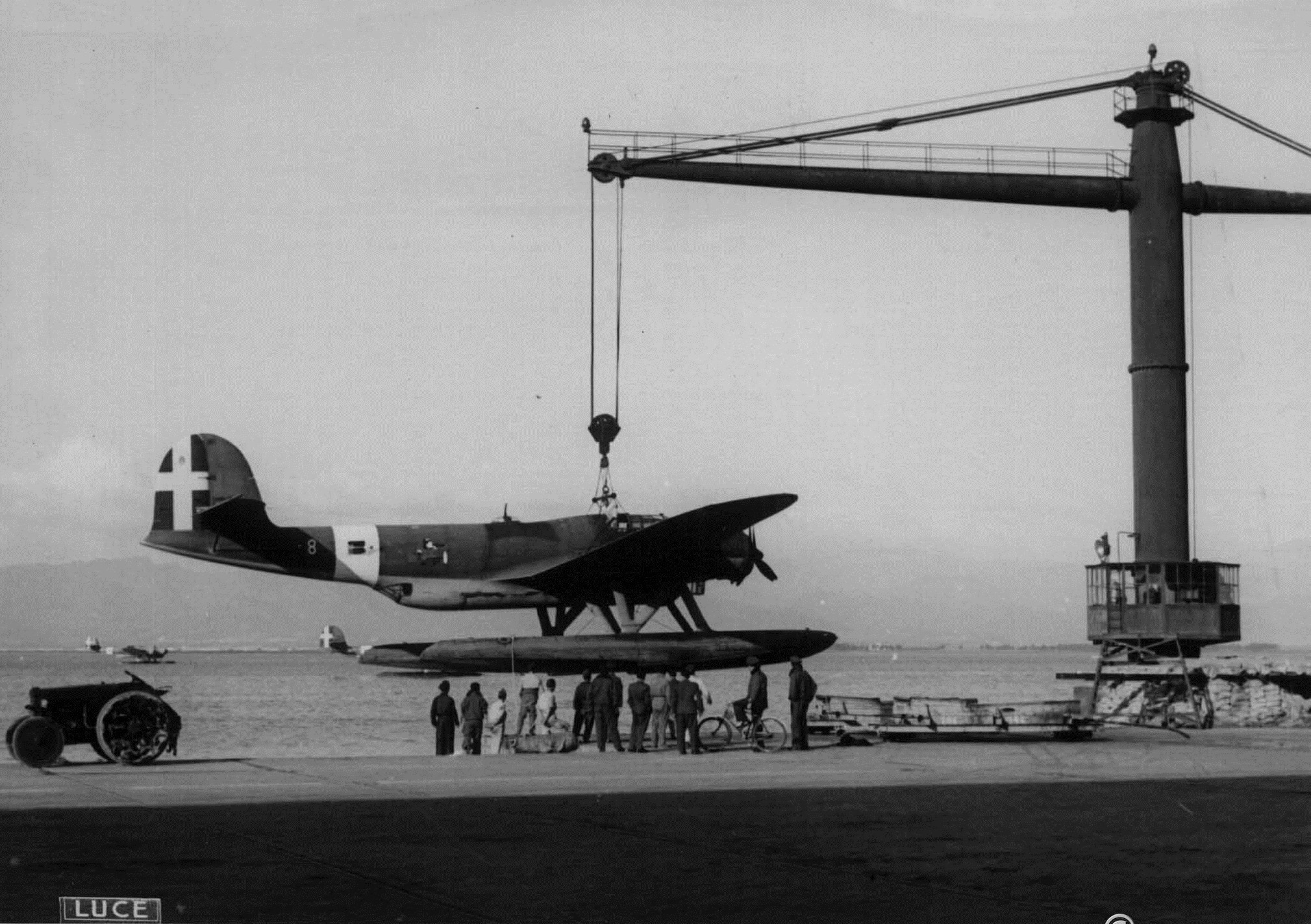
A Z.506B being hoisted by a crane during the early 1940s

The Z.506A entered service with its launch customer, the Italian airline Ala Littoria, which routinely flew the type on its various routes across the Mediterranean. Between 1936 and 1938, the Z.506A set a number of altitude, speed and distance records for its class (mainly while being flown by Mario Stoppani), including speeds of 308.25 km/h (191.54 mph) over 5,000 km (3,100 mi) and 319.78 km/h (198.70 mph) over 2,000 km (1,200 mi), and 322.06 km/h (200.12 mph) over 1,000 km (620 mi). It subsequently flew 5,383.6 km (3,345.2 mi) in a closed circuit. It carried a load of 2,000 kg (4,400 lb) to 7,810 m (25,620 ft) and 5,000 kg (11,000 lb) to 6,917 m (22,694 ft).

During the latter half of the 1930s, CANT were keen to capitalise on the aircraft's success. Accordingly, an enlarged version of the Z.506A, designated as the Z.509, underwent development during this time.

Following the completion of 15 Z.506As for Ala Littoria, CANT reoriented towards the production of a militarised model that was internally designated as the Z.506B. This combat-capable variant, which entered service during 1939, was powered by three 560 kW (750 hp) Alfa Romeo 127 RC 55 engines. Like its earlier sibling, the Z.506B would also set its own records. Unlike the civil-focused Z.506A, the Z.506B was furnished with a large vertically-orientated gondola which accommodated a bomb bay, position for a bombardier, and a rear-facing ventral defensive gun.

The fuselage was supported by a wooden structure that was covered in tulipier wooden lamellas. The wing structure comprised three box-type spars that were linked to one another via a series of wooden wing-ribs that had a plywood covering. The floats, which were 12.50 metres (41 ft) long, were made of duraluminium and covered in 'Chitonal'. (Note: 'Chitonal' is the commercial name of a composite material consisting of 2017 Avional, a copper-magnesium-silicon wrought aluminium alloy sheet, plated with pure aluminium. It has similar strength and corrosion-resistant properties to Alclad.) The defensive armament consisted of a 12.7 mm (0.50 in) Breda-SAFAT machine gun in the dorsal position and three 7.7 mm (0.30 in) machine guns, one in the ventral position and two on the sides of the fuselage. The Z.506 was typically operated by a crew of five.

During January 1943, the final Z.506B was constructed by Piaggio; by this point, in excess of 320 aircraft of the model has been completed. Across all models, 563 Z.506s are believed to have been produced.

== Operational history ==
The first combat use of the Z.506B was as a reconnaissance aircraft and torpedo bomber during the Spanish Civil War. Upon Italy's entry into the Second World War on 10 June 1940, 97 aircraft were operational with two Stormi da Bombardamento Marittimo (sea bombing units) and some Squadriglia da Ricognizione Marittima. 31°Stormo B.M. "autonomo" with 22 planes was based at Cagliari-Elmas airport, in Sardinia; 35° Stormo B.M., with 25 Z.506 in Brindisi, Puglia. At the outbreak of the conflict, four Squadriglie for air-sea rescue missions were formed in Orbetello; these were the 612ª on the Stagnone Lagoon coast of Marsala, with aircraft marked DAMB, GORO, BUIE, CANT (the prototype) and POLA, and the 614ª in Benghazi, with DUCO, ALA, DODO and DAIM. The two other sections with two aircraft each were based in Torre del Lago and in the Aegean Sea at Leros. The latter was later transferred to Rhodes.

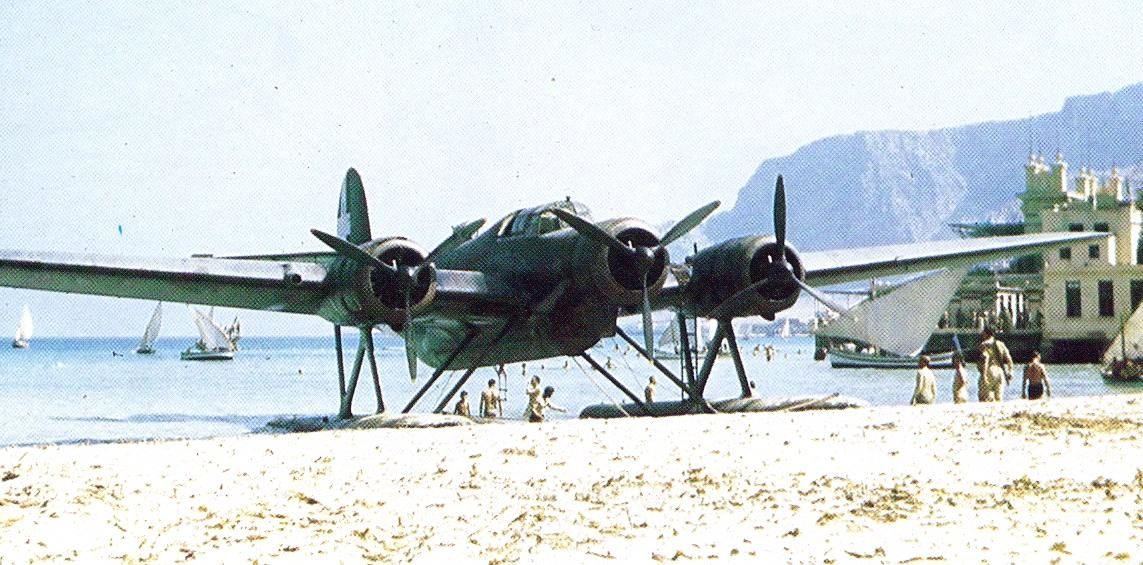
A CANT Z.506B forced down on Mondello beach in Sicily, November 1943

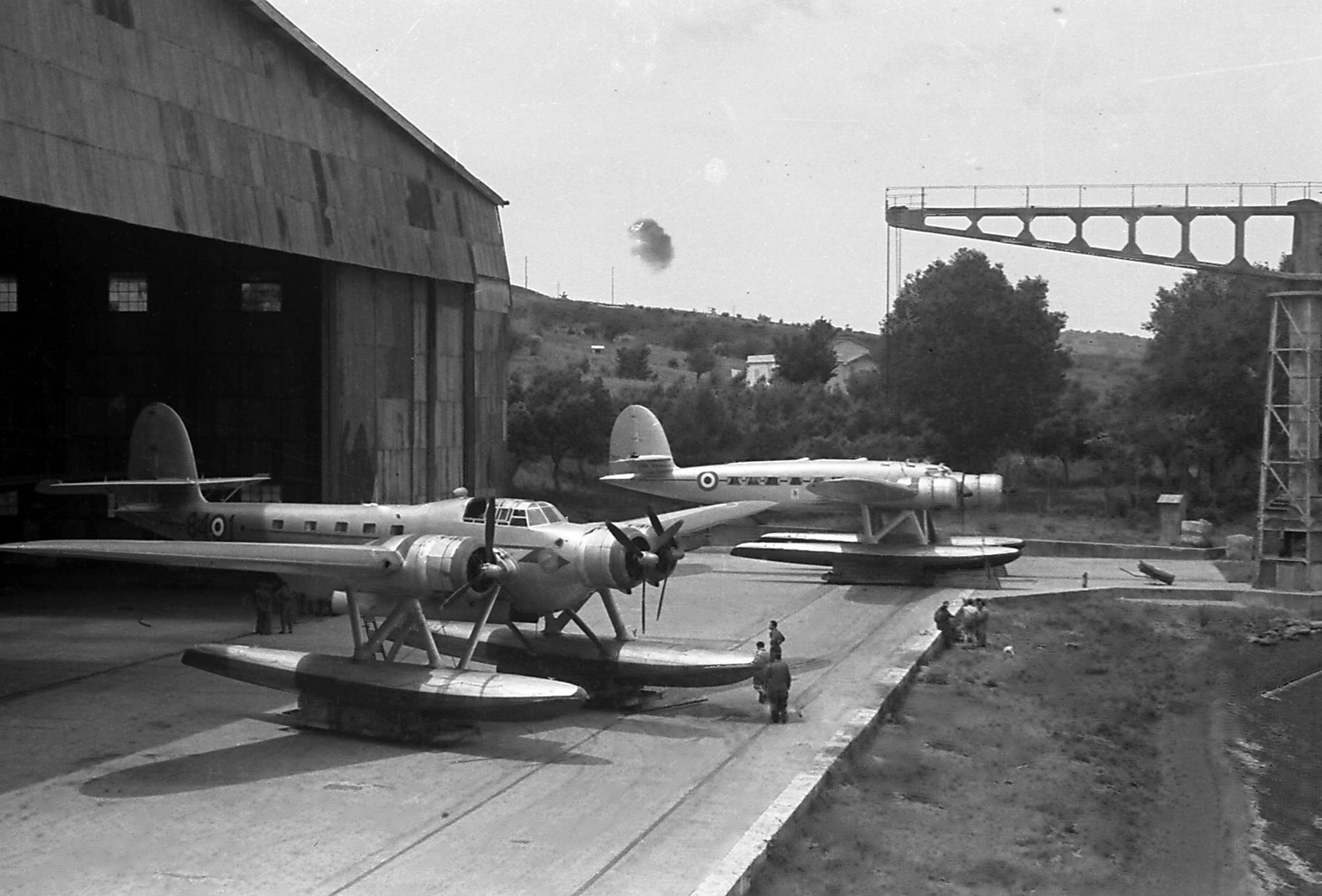
A pair of Z.506 outside a hangar

Throughout 1940 and 1941, the type was used extensively in both France and Greece. On 17 June 1940, the Z.506 saw its first action, one day after a flight of French bombers had attacked Elmas base, killing 21 airmen and destroying multiple Z.501s. On the evening of 17 June, four Z.506Bs from 31° Stormo attacked targets in French North Africa, each dropping two 250 kg and three 100 kg bombs. The type also took part in the Battle of Calabria. In the war against Greece, Z.506s were used against coastal targets and the Corinth canal. It played an important role in the conquest of numerous Greek islands, including Corfu, Cephalonia and Zante. Due to its vulnerability against fighters, it was restricted to use by 'recce' units (Squadriglie da Ricognizione). Typically, Z.506 pilots would withdraw upon coming into contact with Royal Air Force fighters.

As the conflict unfolded, the Z.506 was typically used to conduct maritime patrol, convey escort, anti-submarine warfare, and air-sea rescue missions, especially following the Battle of Taranto and other events that had shifted the balance of naval superiority against Italy. One factor in the reorienting of the Z.506 was the arrival of the Fiat RS.14 floatplane in 1941, which proved to be superior at performing torpedo bomber operations, albeit only even being available in limited quantities. On occasion, individual Z.506s were forced to land in neutral Spain, often as a result of engine failures, combat damage or a lack of fuel. A special air-sea rescue version, the Z.506S Soccorso, was produced; it was operated in small numbers by the Luftwaffe.

The air-sea rescue Z.506s suffered severe losses as many Allied pilots did not stop attacking them even after they had spotted the red crosses. For instance, on 12 June 1942, off Malta, a Hawker Hurricane from 46 Squadron shot down a Z.506, then shot another one down which had been sent to rescue the crew of the first. Sergeant Etchells, in 249 at Malta recalled:

I shot down a Cant Z506 near Sicily, painted white, which had red crosses on its wings, and was apparently an air-rescue aircraft. Sqn Ldr Barton disapproved but the AOC approved. I did not see the red crosses on its wings at the time and do not know if it would have made any difference had I done so."

Among the Allies, the Z.506 gained considerable fame for it being the only aircraft to have been hijacked by prisoners of war (POWs) on the Western Front (it was then used by the RAF from Malta).

Occasionally, the CANT Z.506s managed to shoot down the Allied aircraft that attacked them. On 7 January 1943, a "recce" seaplane from 188ª Squadriglia was attacked on the Mediterranean by two Bristol Blenheim. While pilot Maresciallo Ambrogio Serri headed for Sardinia, Armiere Pietro Bonannini with five bursts of shots from the 12.7 mm machine gun, managed to hit a first Blenheim, that ditched in the sea. Then, the second Blenheim closed on the CANT, strafing it. Bonannini was wounded but he managed to hit the enemy aircraft, that veered and fell overboard. Bonannini, during the war was awarded three Medaglie d'Argento al Valore Militare and a Medaglia di bronzo al Valor Militare.

When Italy surrendered to the Allies, on 8 September 1943, about 70 CANT Z.506s were still in service with the Italian Air Force. About 30 surviving Z.506S were assimilated into Allied forces, these would later serve with the Italian Co-Belligerent Air Force, typically performing transport missions and other secondary duties. The Germans were able to capture numerous Z.506s and put them to use them across various theatres of the war, including Italy, Germany, France, Yugoslavia and even on Greek islands and in Poland. The Z.506s of 171ª Squadriglia continued to operate air/sea rescue and patrol missions from the military port of Toulon with mixed Italian/German crews. Some Z.506s captured by Germans were flown by Italian volunteer crews and operated in 1944 on the Baltic Sea, patrolling the area around Peenemünde.

Numerous aircraft survived the conflict intact and continued to be routinely used during the early postwar years, some of which remained in active service until 1959. Accordingly, the Z.506 saw more than 20 years of service.

== Variants ==
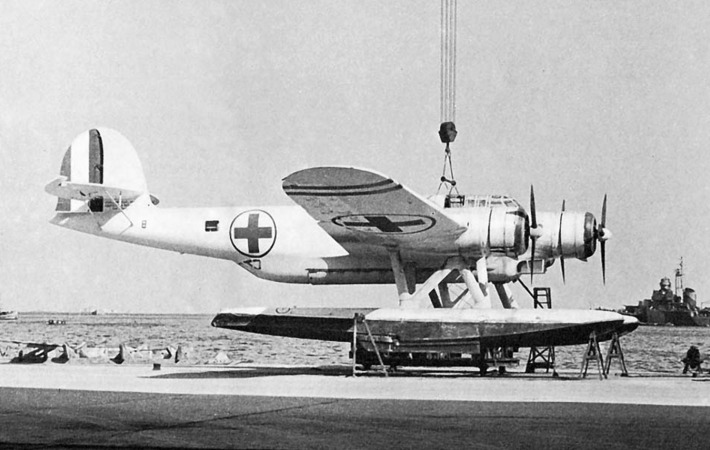
A Z.506C. Note the Red Cross markings

Z.506
Prototype, one built.
Z.506A
Civil version
Z.506B
Military version, 314 built.
Z.506C
Civil version, 38 built.
Z.506S
Air-sea rescue version
Z.506 Landplane
One aircraft was converted to a landplane for an attempt by Mario Stoppani on an endurance record. It did not take place due to bad weather.
Z.509
A larger and heavier version of the Z.506B, three built.

== Operators ==
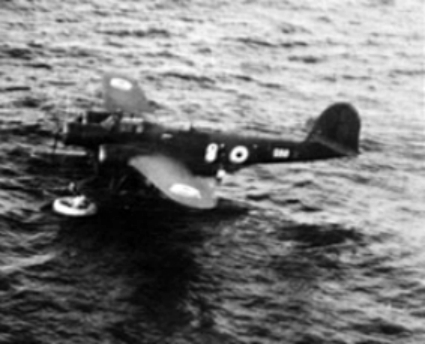
A Z.506 rescuing Royal Australian Air Force airmen near Greece, 1945

Germany

- Luftwaffe (captured)

Kingdom of Italy

- Ala Littoria
- Regia Aeronautica
- Regia Marina
- Aviazione Legionaria
- Italian Co-Belligerent Air Force

Poland

- Polish Air Force received one aircraft out of six ordered. This was destroyed during the German Invasion of Poland.

Spain – Nationalist Forces

- Spanish Nationalist Air Force

United Kingdom

- Royal Air Force captured one aircraft which was briefly operated from Malta

Postwar
Italy

- Italian Air Force operated 37 aircraft until 1960
- Aviazione Navale Italiana

== Surviving aircraft ==
The only surviving CANT is a Z.506B that was produced during 1941. Faithfully restored, it belongs to the 15th lot and has the construction number MM.45425. It was tested by Nicolò Lana on 19 December 1941, and registered with the number 84-4. It was delivered on 12 January 1942, and assigned to the 186ª Squadriglia, based in Agusta, Sicily, and carried out its first mission on 12 January 1942. It is exhibited at the Italian Air Force Museum (Museo Storico dell'Aeronautica), in Vigna di Valle, near Bracciano, north of Rome.

== Specifications (Z.506B Series XII) ==
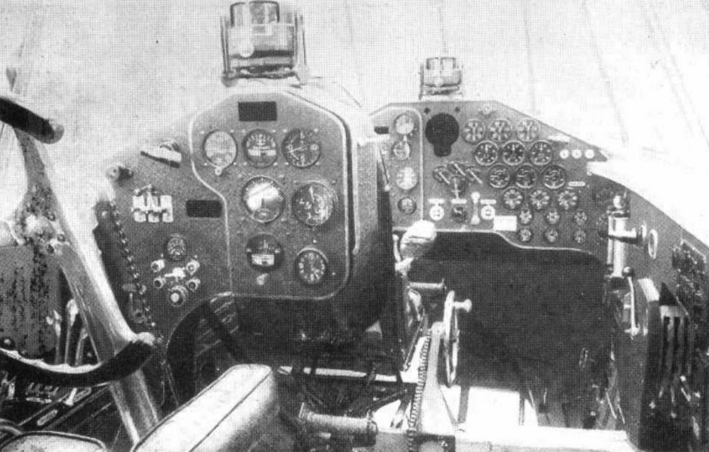
Inside the cockpit of a Z.506

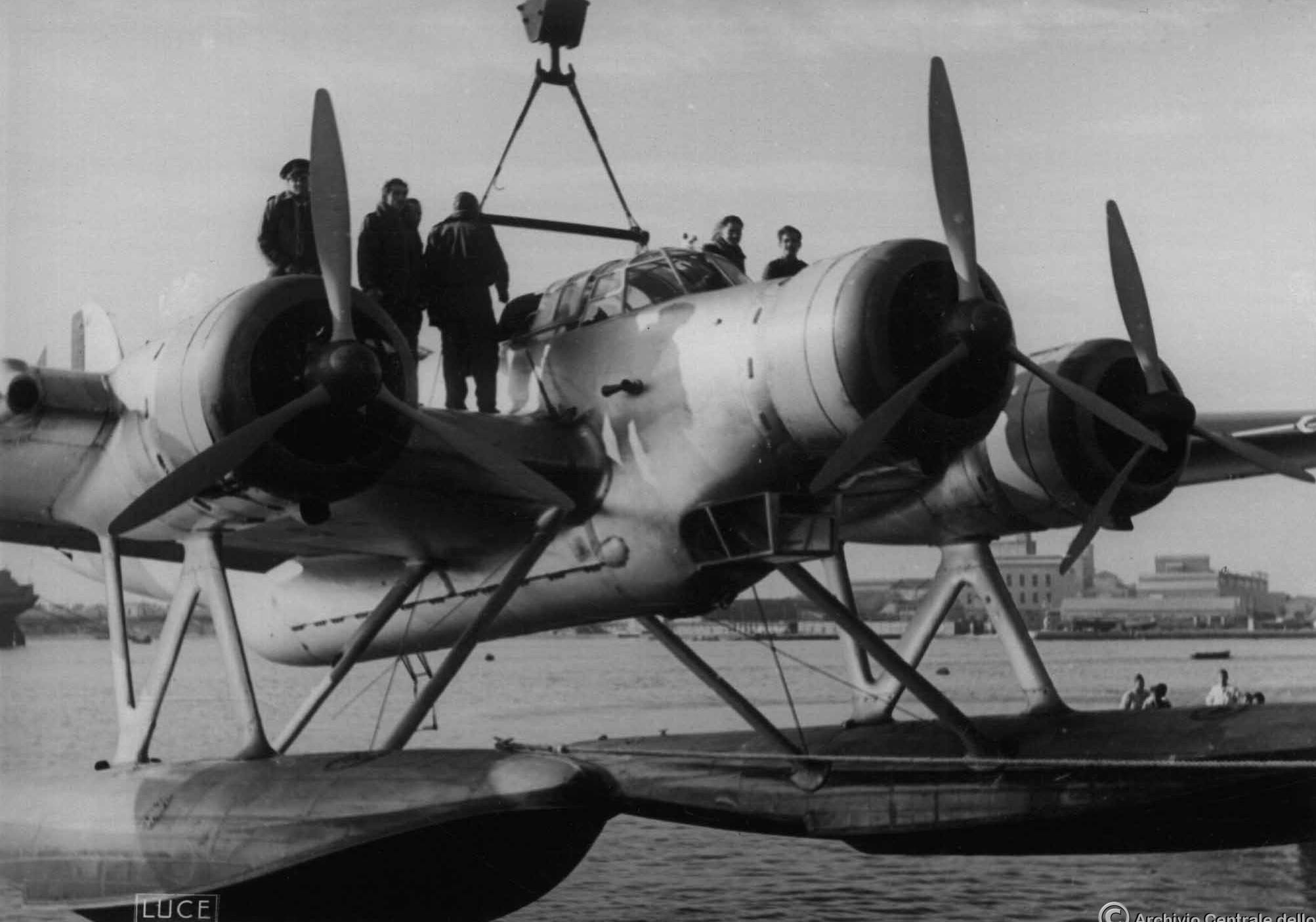
A suspended Z.506 with several personnel on top of it

Data from The Encyclopedia of Weapons of World War II, Italian Civil and Military Aircraft 1930–1945

General characteristics

- Crew: 5
- Length: 19.24 m (63 ft 1 in)
- Wingspan: 26.5 m (86 ft 11 in)
- Height: 7.45 m (24 ft 5 in)
- Wing area: 86.26 m^{2} (928.5 sq ft)
- Empty weight: 8,750 kg (19,290 lb)
- Max takeoff weight: 12,705 kg (28,010 lb)
- Powerplant: 3 × Alfa Romeo 126 R.C.34 nine-cylinder air-cooled radial piston engines, 560 kW (750 hp) each
- Propellers: 3-bladed variable-pitch propellers

Performance

- Maximum speed: 350 km/h (220 mph, 190 kn)
- Cruise speed: 300 km/h (190 mph, 160 kn)
- Range: 2,000 km (1,200 mi, 1,100 nmi) with a 950 kg (2,095 lb) bomb load
- Endurance: six hours and 26 minutes
- Service ceiling: 7,000 m (23,000 ft)
- Time to altitude: 4,000 m (13,120 ft) in 20 minutes

Armament

- Guns:
  - 1 × 12.7 mm (0.50 in) Isotta Fraschini-Scotti machine gun in a Caproni-Lanciani Delta E dorsal turret
  - 3 × 7.7 mm (0.303 in) Breda-SAFAT machine guns
- Bombs:
  - 1,200 kg (2,645 lb) of general ordnance or
  - 1 × 816 kg (1,800 lb) torpedo

== See also ==
Related development

- CANT Z.509

Aircraft of comparable role, configuration, and era

- Douglas XC-47C (floatplane)
- Fiat RS.14
- Heinkel He 115

Related lists

- List of aircraft of World War II
- List of interwar military aircraft
- List of flying boats and floatplanes
- List of maritime patrol aircraft
