= Fiat G.18 =

G.18
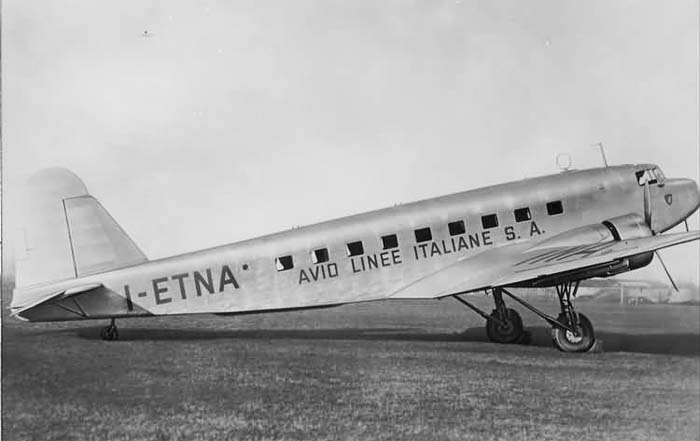

General information
- Type: Airliner
- Manufacturer: Fiat
- Designer: Giuseppe Gabrielli
- Number built: 9

History
- First flight: 18 March 1935

The Fiat G.18 was an Italian airliner developed in the mid-1930s.

== Design ==
It was a conventional low-wing monoplane with twin engines mounted on the wings, similar in appearance to the Douglas DC-2. The main units of the tailwheel undercarriage retracted into the engine nacelles, leaving their wheels partially exposed. The cabin seated 18 passengers.

== Service history ==
Three G.18s were put into service with Fiat's own airline, ALI, early in 1936; the feedback received was that the type was underpowered. Fiat responded the following year with a revised version, the G.18V which had more powerful engines, and a redesigned fin and long dorsal strake. Six of these were delivered to ALI, which operated them on its European routes until the outbreak of war.

In June 1940, ALI was brought under control of the Regia Aeronautica (Royal Italian Air Force), and the G.18s were put to use as transports. Among other operations, they flew troops to Albania in November 1940 as part of the campaign against Greece. By the time of the Italian armistice, only one remained in operation, with another three captured by Germany, and a fifth aircraft in use by the remaining Italian Fascist forces. This latter aircraft was involved in a major accident on 30 April 1944 when, loaded with munitions, it exploded on the runway at Bresso. The blast caused considerable damage to the airfield.

== Variants ==
- G.18 - original version with Fiat A.59 engines (3 built)
- G.18V - revised version with Fiat A.80 engines (6 built)

== Operators ==
Kingdom of Italy

- Avio Linee Italiane (ALI)
- Regia Aeronautica

== Specifications (G.18V) ==
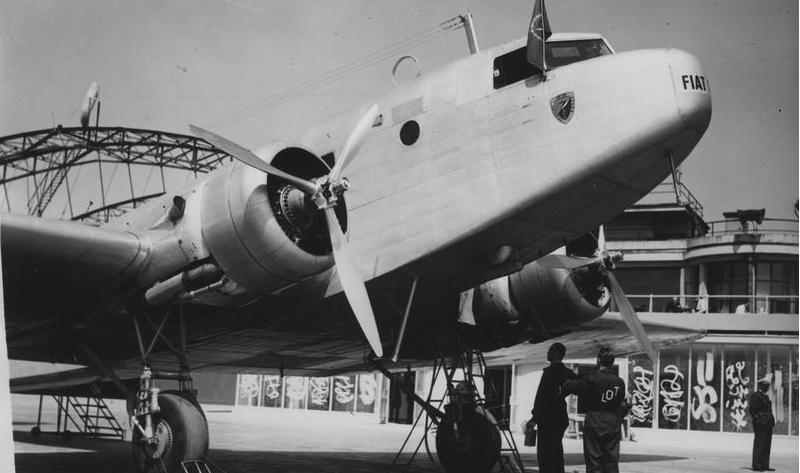

Data from

General characteristics

- Crew: three
- Capacity: 18 passengers
- Length: 18.81 m (61 ft 9 in)
- Wingspan: 25.00 m (82 ft 1 in)
- Height: 5.01 m (16 ft 5 in)
- Wing area: 88.3 m^{2} (950 sq ft)
- Empty weight: 7,200 kg (15,900 lb)
- Gross weight: 10,800 kg (23,800 lb)
- Powerplant: 2 × Fiat A.80 , 746 kW (1,000 hp) each

Performance

- Maximum speed: 400 km/h (250 mph, 220 kn)
- Range: 1,675 km (1,041 mi, 905 nmi)
- Service ceiling: 8,700 m (28,600 ft)
- Rate of climb: 4.8 m/s (944 ft/min)

== See also ==
Related lists

- List of aircraft of World War II

== Sources ==
- Taylor, Michael J. H. (1989). Jane's Encyclopedia of Aviation. London: Studio Editions. p. 389.
- "File 894 Sheet 21". World Aircraft Information Files. London: Bright Star Publishing.
