= Fiat RS.14 =

1942 reconnaissance aircraft model by Fiat

RS.14
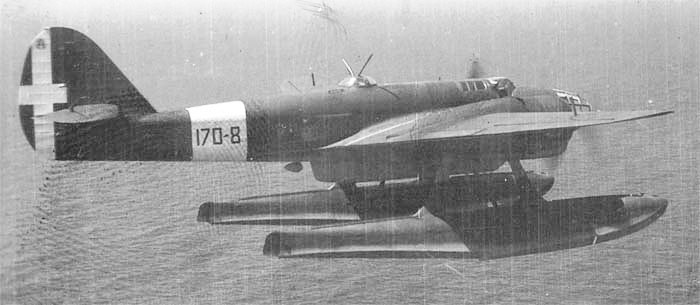

General information
- Type: Long-range maritime reconnaissance floatplane
- Manufacturer: Fiat
- Designer: Manlio Stiavelli
- Primary users: Regia Aeronautica Italian Co-Belligerent Air Force
- Number built: 186 plus 2 prototypes

History
- Manufactured: May 1941 - September 1943
- Introduction date: May 1941
- First flight: May 1939
- Retired: 1948

The Fiat RS.14 was an Italian long-range maritime strategic reconnaissance floatplane. The RS.14 was a four/five seat all-metal cantilever low/mid-wing monoplane powered by two wing-mounted 626 kW (839 hp) Fiat A.74 R.C.38 engines. It had a conventional cantilever tail unit with a single fin and rudder. Its undercarriage consisted of two large floats on struts. It had a glazed nose for an observer or bomb aimer. The pilot and copilot sat side by side with a wireless operator's compartment behind them. In the bombing role the RS.14 was fitted with a long ventral gondola to carry various combinations of anti-submarine bombs (up to 400 kg (880 lb)).

== Development ==
The RS.14 was designed by Manlio Stiavelli at the CMASA works at Marina di Pisa. The first of two prototypes flew in May 1939. A prototype land plane version AS.14 was built and first flown on 11 August 1943. It was designed as a ground-attack aircraft and intended to be armed with a 37 mm (1.5 in) cannon and 12.7 mm (0.50 in) machine guns. It was not ordered and no others were built.

== Operational history ==
The RS.14 went into service with the Regia Aeronautica with a number of maritime strategic reconnaissance squadrons at bases around the Italian coast, in Sicily and in Sardinia. They were used for convoy escort and anti-submarine patrols. Occasionally they engaged in aerial combat, obtaining unexpected victories such as when, on Saturday 9 May 1942, an RS.14 intercepted Spitfires that took off from the carriers HMS Eagle and USS Wasp, headed for Malta, and machine-gunned two. The two RAF fighters collided and fell into the sea. Both pilots were killed. After the 1943 Armistice a few survivors were operated by the Italian Co-Belligerent Air Force. At the end of the Second World War the aircraft were used for liaison duties around the Mediterranean carrying up to four passengers.

== Variants ==
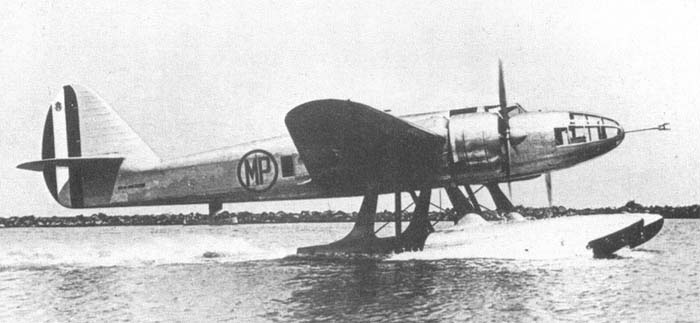
Fiat RS.14 in bare metal finish

RS.14
Production float plane with 840 hp (618 kW) Fiat A.74 R.C.38 engines, 188 built including two prototypes.
AS.14
Land plane version with retractable landing gear, one built.

== Operators ==
Kingdom of Italy

- Regia Aeronautica
- Italian Co-Belligerent Air Force

Italy

- Italian Air Force operated six surviving Fiat RS.14 until 1948

== Specifications ==
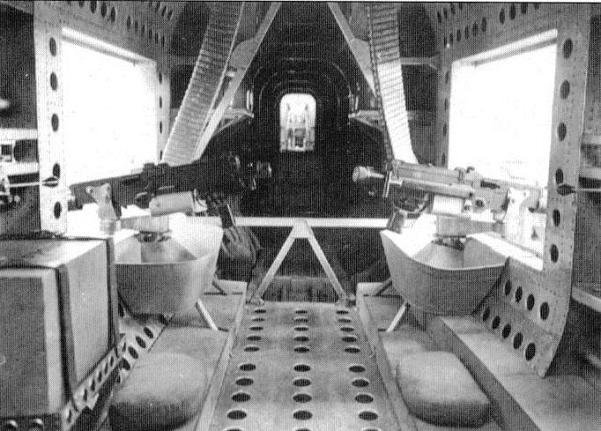
The waist gun positions of a FIAT RS.14

Data from Donald, 1997, pg 413.

General characteristics

- Crew: three
- Length: 14.1 m (46 ft 3.25 in)
- Wingspan: 19.54 m (64 ft 1.25 in)
- Height: 5.63 m (18 ft 5.75 in)
- Wing area: 50 m^{2} (538.21 sq ft)
- Empty weight: 5,470 kg (12,059 lb)
- Gross weight: 8,470 kg (18,673 lb)
- Powerplant: 2 × Fiat A.74 R.C.38 14-cylinder radial piston , 618 kW (840 hp) each

Performance

- Maximum speed: 390 km/h (242 mph, 210 kn)
- Range: 2,500 km (1,553 mi, 1,350 nmi)
- Service ceiling: 6,300 m (20,670 ft)

Armament

- 1 × 12.7 mm (0.5 in) machine gun
- 2 × 7.7 mm (0.303 in) machine guns
- up to 400 kg (882 lb) of bombs

== See also ==
- CANT Z.501
- CANT Z.506

Aircraft of comparable role, configuration, and era

- Hall XPTBH
- Heinkel He 115
- Fokker T.VIII

Related lists

- List of aircraft of World War II
- List of Interwar military aircraft
