= Fiat A.80 =

1940s Italian piston aircraft engine

A.80
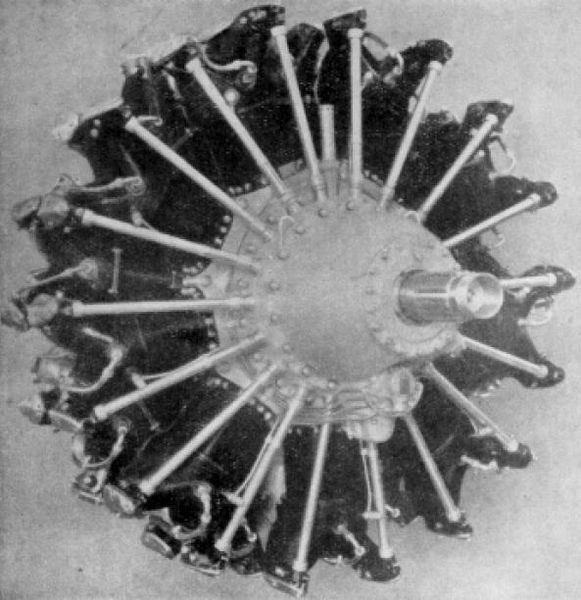
- Type: Radial engine
- National origin: Italy
- Manufacturer: Fiat
- Major applications: Breda Ba.65; Fiat BR.20 Cicogna; Fiat G.18; Savoia-Marchetti SM.79 Sparviero
- Developed from: Fiat A.74
- Developed into: Fiat A.82

The Fiat A.80 was an 18-cylinder, twin-row, air-cooled, radial aircraft engine produced during World War II. Rated at 750 kW (1,000 hp), it was a more powerful development of the 14-cylinder Fiat A.74.

== Variants ==
Fiat A.80 R.C.20
With reduction gear and supercharger, rated altitude 2,000 m (6,600 ft).
Fiat A.80 R.C.40
With reduction gear and supercharger, rated altitude 4,000 m (13,000 ft).
Fiat A.80 R.C.41
With reduction gear and supercharger, rated altitude 4,100 m (13,500 ft).

== Applications ==
- Aeronautica Umbra Trojani AUT.18
- Breda Ba.65
- CANSA FC.20
- CANT Z.509
- Fiat BR.20 Cicogna
- Fiat G.18
- Savoia-Marchetti SM.79 Sparviero

== Specifications (A.80 R.C.41) ==
Data from

=== General characteristics ===
- Type: 18-cylinder air-cooled radial
- Bore: 140 mm (5.51 in)
- Stroke: 165 mm (6.50 in)
- Displacement: 45.72 L (2789.9 cu in)
- Length: 1,155 mm (45.47 in)
- Width: 653 mm (25.71 in)
- Height: 1,335 mm (52.56 in)
- Dry weight: 725 kg (1598.4 lb)

=== Components ===
- Valvetrain: One intake and one sodium-cooled exhaust valve per cylinder
- Supercharger: Single Speed, Single Stage. 4,100 m rated altitude
- Fuel system: 1 Fiat carburettor
- Fuel type: 87 octane
- Cooling system: air-cooled

=== Performance ===
- Power output: 750 kW (1,000 hp) at 2,100 rpm at 4,100 m (13,500 ft)
  820 kW (1,100 hp) at 2,100rpm at Sea Level
- Compression ratio: 6.7:1
- Power-to-weight ratio: 1.0 kW/kg (0.6 hp/lb) at cruise speed

== See also ==
Related development

- Fiat A.74

Related lists

- List of aircraft engines
