= CANT Z.509 =

Floatplane

General information
- Type: Mail plane
- Manufacturer: CANT
- Primary user: Ala Littoria
- Number built: 3

History
- Introduction date: 1937
- First flight: 1937

The CANT Z.509 was a three-engine Italian floatplane developed from the Z.506A for use as a mailplane.

== Design and development ==
Designed as a larger and heavier version of the Z.506A, three aircraft were built in 1937 for Ala Littoria. The aircraft were for use on the airline's transatlantic postal service to South America. The aircraft was a twin-float seaplane powered by three Fiat A.80 R.C.41 radial engines. With the outbreak of World War II, development of the type was abandoned.

== Operators ==
Kingdom of Italy

- Ala Littoria

== Specifications (Z.509) ==
Data from

General characteristics

- Length: 19.15 m (62 ft 10 in)
- Wingspan: 28.32 m (92 ft 11 in)
- Height: 7.52 m (24 ft 8 in)
- Wing area: 99.95 m^{2} (1,075.8 sq ft)
- Empty weight: 9,979 kg (22,000 lb)
- Gross weight: 15,966 kg (35,200 lb)
- Powerplant: 3 × Fiat A.80 R.C.41 18-cyl. air-cooled radial piston engines

Performance

- Maximum speed: 425 km/h (264 mph, 229 kn) at 4,500 m (14,760 ft)
- Cruise speed: 349 km/h (217 mph, 189 kn)
- Range: 3,748 km (2,329 mi, 2,024 nmi) to 3,988 km (2,478 mi; 2,153 nmi)
- Service ceiling: 8,000 m (26,240 ft)
- Rate of climb: 5.4 m/s (1,060 ft/min)
- Time to altitude: 4,500 m (14,760 ft) in 14 minutes

== See also ==
Aircraft of comparable role, configuration, and era

- Consolidated PBY Catalina
- Heinkel He 115

Related lists

- List of flying boats and floatplanes
