= Avio Linee Italiane =

IATA	ICAO	Call sign
AV	—	—
- Commenced operations: 1926
- Ceased operations: 31 March 1952
- Operating bases: Taliedo
- Headquarters: Milan

Avio Linee Italiane (ALI) was an Italian independent airline owned by the Fiat Group, which operated between 1926 and 1952. It was ultimately acquired by Linee Aeree Italiane (LAI). ALI was the country's only pre-World War II airline not to be nationalized by the Italian Government.

== History ==
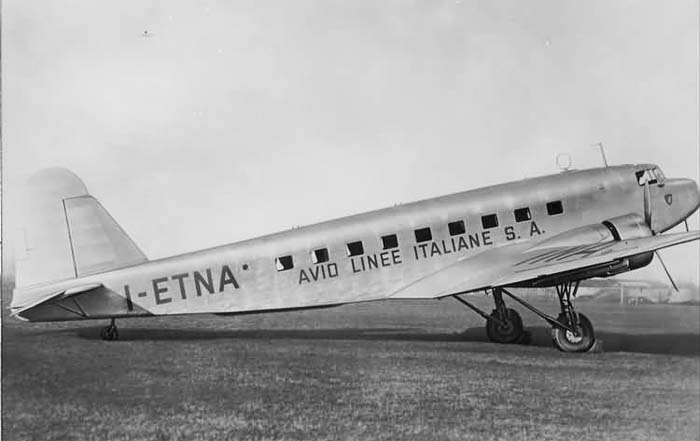
Avio Linee Italiane Fiat G.18

Some sources indicate that ALI began operations in 1926. ALI began passenger service between Rome and Munich in May 1928 and extended service to Berlin in 1931. As of 1931, ALI had a fleet of seven aircraft Fokker F.VII. During the 1930s, ALI expanded service to other Italian cities, and beginning in 1938, it added at least one international route (Venice-Milan-Turin-Paris-London). As of 1939, ALI had a fleet of 16 aircraft, including one DC-2 (I-EROS), nine Fiat G.18/G.18V, and six Savoia-Marchetti aircraft (possibly the S.73s).

In 1940, with the Italian entry into World War II, ALI was incorporated into the Regia Aeronautica (Royal Italian Air Force). At least one S.73 and four G.18 were lost in operational accidents during the war.

ALI was reconstituted in 1947, using the Fiat G.12. The airline reportedly ordered six G.212 in 1947, and, at some point, acquired at least one C-47. In 1949, ALI merged with two small post-war Italian independent airlines: Airone (also a Fiat G.12 operator) and Transadriatica, to form ALI - Flotte Riunite, with a combined fleet of seven G.12/G.212s and a dozen C-47s. The combined airline had an extensive route structure, encompassing Barcelona, Paris, Brussels, Amsterdam, Frankfurt, Prague, Vienna, Athens and Brussels.

ALI-Flotte Riunite was liquidated in 1952 and subsequently was acquired by LAI..

== Notable accidents ==
The Aviation Safety Network reports four notable peacetime accidents:

On 4 May 1949, an ALI G.212CP, registration I-ELCE, on a charter flight carrying the Turin soccer team home from Lisbon, struck a church on approach to the Turin airport, killing four crew members and all 27 passengers.

On 6 December 1948, an ALI C-47, registration I-ETNA, crashed on takeoff from Milan-Linate airport, killing six crew members and one passenger.

On 1 July 1948 (1948 Keerbergen Fiat G.212 airplane crash), an ALI G.212PW, registration I-ELSA, crashed while attempting an emergency landing at Keerbergen Airfield, Belgium, killing four crew members and four passengers.

On 16 March 1940, an ALI S.73, registration I-SUTO, en route from Tripoli to Rome via Catania, crashed on the slopes of Mount Stromboli, killing five people.

== See also ==
- List of defunct airlines of Italy

== Sources ==
- Davies, Ronald Edward George (1964). A history of the world's airlines. Oxford University Press.
