= Aeronautica Umbra =

Italian aircraft manufacturer

Aeronautica Umbra SA was an Italian aircraft manufacturer founded at Foligno in 1935 by Muzio Macchi. The firm produced SM.79 bombers for the Regia Aeronautica but never enjoyed success with its own designs. Its best-known attempt was the AUT.18 fighter of 1936. Another promising prototype, the MB.902 had two Daimler-Benz DB 605 engines within the fuselage, driving contra-rotating propellers mounted on the wings, but this was destroyed without ever having flown.

After World War II, the company re-formed and in 1968 commenced work on a design for a three-engine STOL transport aircraft designated the AUM-903. This, however, was never actually built, although the company did manufacture Scheibe Falke under licence for a time.

== See also ==
- List of Italian companies
