= CANSA FC.20 =

Twin engine reconnaissance bomber/ground attack monoplane

FC.20
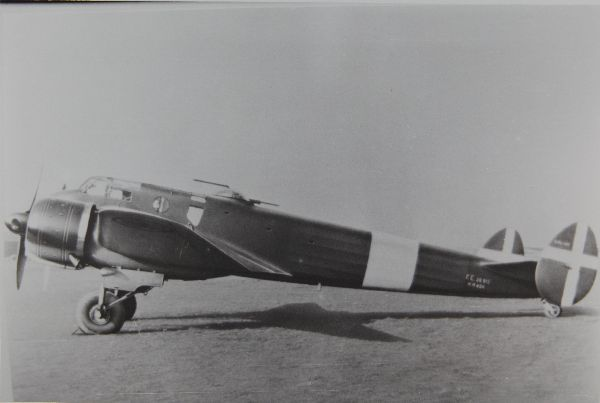

General information
- Type: Ground attack
- National origin: Italy
- Manufacturer: Construzioni Aeronautiche Novaresi S.A. (FIAT) (CANSA)
- Number built: c.6

History
- First flight: 12 April 1941

The CANSA FC.20 was a twin engine reconnaissance bomber/ground attack monoplane designed and built in Italy in 1941. Several versions with different armament and engines were flown but only the FC.20bis ground attack variant reached squadron service, in very small numbers, before the 1943 armistice.

== Design and development ==
The FC.20 was originally intended as a reconnaissance bomber but was developed instead as a ground attack aircraft. The first prototype first flew on 12 April 1941, piloted by Moroni. Four variants were structurally and aerodynamically similar apart from the front fuselage detail and engine installations.

The FC.20 was a cantilever low wing monoplane with a straight tapered wing of aspect ratio about 6.4. The leading edge was almost unswept and the tips rounded. The wing had positive dihedral outboard of the engines. The trailing edges carried short span, tabbed ailerons and split flaps which reached past the lower engine fairings to the wing roots. The twin engines were mounted forward of the leading edge with the propeller shaft in the wing plane; the mainwheels of the conventional undercarriage retracted backwards into the extended underwing engine fairings. The FC.20 had a twin tail, with elliptically shaped endplate vertical surfaces almost equally divided vertically between fin and rudder. These were mounted on a tapered tailplane with significant dihedral, carrying tabbed, tapered elevators. The rear fuselage extended beyond the empennage, providing a housing for the retractable tailwheel.

In the unarmed reconnaissance bomber first prototype FC.20, the side-by-side cockpit was placed above the wing leading edge. A long glazed nose extended forwards from the cockpit to beyond the plane of the propellers.

The second, ground attack FC.20bis prototype differed chiefly from the first in having a shortened nose, a cockpit placed ahead of the wing leading edge and full armament, though there was also a slight increase in wing area. The solid nose contained a 37 mm (1.46 in) Breda cannon, supplemented by a pair of 12.7 mm (0.5 in) Scotti machine guns in the wing roots. An enclosed, rotating dorsal turret to the rear of the cockpit but still over the wing contained a similar machine gun. Two 160 kg (352 lb) bombs could be released from external wing mountings and small bombs from within the fuselage.

Two other variants also flew, both distinguished chiefly by their engines. The FC.20ter was a modification of the FC.20 with 745 kW (1,000 hp) Fiat A.80 R.C.41 radials. Unlike the FC.20, this aircraft had the dorsal turret of the FC.20bis and a nose-mounted, long-barrelled cannon. The sole FC.20quater was one of the few production FC.20bis aircraft, re-engined with 935 kW (1,250 hp) Daimler-Benz DB 601 V-12, liquid-cooled motors. It was fitted with a 37 mm (1.46 in) Mauser Ikaria cannon and a pair of 20 mm (0.79 in) cannon replaced the wing root machine guns of the FC.20bis. Tested in 1943, it flew higher and 80 kmh (50 mph) faster than the FC.20bis.

== Operational history ==
A few production FC.20bis were built, and it is known that three served the 174^{a} Squadriglia Ricognizione Strategica in July 1943 but were not used operationally. Italian military operations ceased with the armistice of September 1943.

== Variants ==
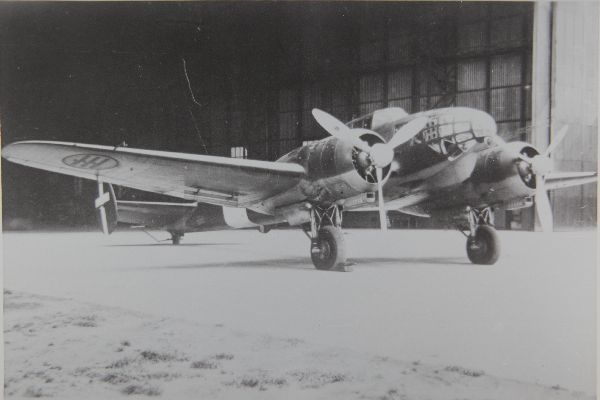
CANSA FC-20

FC.20
First prototype, long nose reconnaissance version.
FC.20bis
Short nose ground attack version. Dorsal turret.
FC.20ter
As FC.20 with 745 kW (1,000 hp) Fiat A.80 R.C.41 twin row 18-cylinder radial engines. Dorsal turret.
FC.20quater
As FC.20bis with 935 kW (1,250 hp) Daimler-Benz DB 601 inverted V-12 engines. Dorsal turret.

== Units using this aircraft ==
- 174^{a} Squadriglia Ricognizione Strategica (174th Strategic Reconnaissance Squadron).

== Specifications (FC.20bis) ==
Data from Italian Civil and Military Aircraft 1930-1945

General characteristics

- Length: 12.18 m (40 ft 0 in)
- Wingspan: 16.00 m (52 ft 6 in)
- Height: 3.81 m (12 ft 6 in)
- Wing area: 40.0 m^{2} (431 sq ft)
- Gross weight: 6,820 kg (15,035 lb)
- Powerplant: 2 × Fiat A.74 R.C.38 twin row, 14-cylinder radial, 630 kW (840 hp) each

Performance

- Maximum speed: 420 km/h (261 mph, 227 kn)
- Cruise speed: 340 km/h (211 mph, 183 kn)
- Range: 1,150 km (710 mi, 620 nmi)
- Service ceiling: 6,930 m (22,750 ft)

Armament

- Guns: 1 × nose mounted 37 mm Breda 37/54 cannon; 2 × 12.7 mm Breda-SAFAT machine guns in wing roots; 1 × 12.7 mm machine gun in dorsal turret.
- Bombs: 2 × 160 kg (352 lb) bombs externally outboard of engines; 126 × 2 kg (4.4 lb) anti-personnel bombs internally.

== See also ==
Aircraft of comparable role, configuration, and era

- Bristol Beaufighter
- Breguet 693
- CAC Woomera
- Douglas A-20 Havoc/Boston
- Kawasaki Ki-45
- Petlyakov Pe-2
- Rogožarski R-313
- Savoia-Marchetti SM.89

== Sources ==
- Angelucci, Enzo. The Rand McNally Encyclopedia of Military Aircraft, 1914-1980. San Diego, California: The Military Press, 1983. ISBN 0-517-41021-4.
- Thompson, Jonathan. Italian Civil and Military Aircraft 1930–1945. Fallbrook, CaliforniaAero Publishers, Inc, 1963.
