= Felice Trojani =

Italian engineer (1897–1971)

- Born: April 18, 1897
- Died: November 3, 1971 (aged 74)
- Occupations: Airship engineer, airplane engineer
- Known for: Preparation and shipment of dirigible Italia, design of the Red Tent

Felice Trojani (18 April 1897 – 3 November 1971) was an Italian airship and airplane engineer.

He collaborated with Umberto Nobile and participated in the preparation and shipment of the dirigible Italia to the North Pole, which was lost in the fleeting flight of 1928 on the polar pack ice. Trojani was one of the survivors of the disaster and, along with his comrades, was saved on the arctic pack after 48 days spent sheltering in the famous Red Tent, which he designed.

== Biography ==
Trojani told his life in his book "Minosse's tail", dedicated to his passion for flying. Trojani's interest began at the age of 11, on 24 May 1908, watching Léon Delagrange's first attempt to fly in Rome, from the opposite bank of the Tiber. The book goes on to describe his youth in Rome, his high school studies at the high school gymnasium Torquato Tasso (Rome), the entrance to the Application School of Engineers of San Pietro in Vincoli in Rome, the call to arms as Aspirant in the Great War and subsequent imprisonment in Germany.

When he returned from captivity, Felice Trojani resumed his studies in engineering and found employment at CNA. He traveled to Japan in January 1927 to follow Umberto Nobile for mounting the N-3 airship, built at Rome's workshops for the Japanese Imperial Navy. In Japan Umberto Nobile asked Felice Trojani to collaborate on the arrangement of the Norge airship expedition to the North Pole.

He participated in the design and construction of the Littorio Airport in Rome. It was renamed in 1927 by Umberto Nobile, first of all crew members, to contribute to the creation and to participate in the airship Italy, which collaborated with designing and assembly, to the North Pole.

Upon returning from the Soviet Union, he became the technical director of Foligno Aeronautica Umbra SA (AUSA), where he designed the AUSA AUT 18 and AUT 45 aircraft. During the Second World War, he worked in Rome as Engineer of the Castelli Company at the Vatican City.

At the end of World War II he emigrated to São Paulo, where he opened a precision mechanics industry. Trojani was at the time the only one among survivors of the airship Italy never to have told publicly that version, even for the ban (ignored by everyone else). He was contacted in 1960 by the American psychiatrist George Simmons, at that time looking for information for its volume Target: Arctic, in which he analyzes the psychology of participants in the trip to the North Pole. Simmons convinced Felice Trojani to finally write his version, and to tell all the prodromes and consequences on his life of participation in the expedition. The Tail of Minos became the tale of half a century of aeronautics in Italy, from the dawn until the Second World War.

== Publications ==
- Felice Trojani, The Tail of Minosse: A Man's Life, A Business History, IX Edition, Milan 2007, Ugo Mursia.
- Felice Trojani, Last Flight, IV Edition, Milan 2008, Ugo Mursia.
- Felice Trojani, Roald Engelbert Amundsen - The Hero of Polar Ice, Milan 1971, Ugo Mursia
- Felice Trojani, The Queen of Tuxar, Milan 1970, Ugo Mursia
- Felice Trojani, The Aviation novel, Milan 1969, Ugo Mursia - Rome 2012, Lulu [1]
- Felice Trojani, Lessons Learned Airplane Pilots, CNA Cerveteri 1924
- Felice Trojani, Opening of a new airport in Rome for airplanes and seaplanes, IV International Congress of Air Navigation, Rome October 1927 [2]
- Giorgio Evangelisti, a good and adventurous designer: Felice Trojani, in Air People, vol IV, p. 298, Editorial Olimpia, Florence 1996
- Giuseppe Ciampaglia, "Arturo Mercanti, an extraordinary precursor of cycling in automobile and aviation" IBN publisher, Rome 2014. ISBN 88-7565-204-X
- Giuseppe Ciampaglia, "The planes and engines of Giovanni Bonmartini's National Aeronautical Company". IBN publisher, Rome 2012. ISBN 8-8756-5124-8 .
- Giuseppe Ciampaglia, "Happy Trojani a Roman to the North Pole" Strenna dei Romanisti 2015. Roma 2015, Editrice Roma Amor.
