= Fiat G.212 =

Italian three-engine passenger and transport aircraft, 1947

G.212
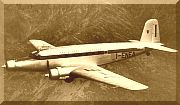

General information
- Type: Airliner
- Manufacturer: Fiat
- Primary user: Italian Air Force
- Number built: 19; 26

History
- Manufactured: 1947–1950
- Introduction date: 1947
- First flight: 19 January 1947
- Developed from: Fiat G.12

The Fiat G.212 was an Italian three-engine airliner of the 1940s. An enlarged development of Fiat's earlier G.12 transport, it was used in small numbers in commercial service and by the Italian Air Force.

== Development and design ==
The first prototype of the G.212, the G.212CA military transport, flew on 19 January 1947. While very similar in configuration to the G.12, i.e. a low-wing all-metal cantilever monoplane with a retractable tailwheel undercarriage, the G.212 was longer, and had a larger wing and a wider fuselage. It was powered by three 642 kW (860 hp) Alfa Romeo 128 radial engines.

It was followed by two versions intended for civil use, the G.212CP airliner, with accommodation for 34 passengers, and the G.212TP freighter, both using the more powerful Pratt & Whitney R-1830 Twin Wasp engines.

== Operational history ==
The G.212CP entered service with Avio Linee Italiane ("Italian Airlines"), which ordered six, in 1947, being operated on routes within Europe. On Thursday 1 July 1948 I-ELSA, a flight from Milano to Brussels crashed near Keerbergen airfield (eight people died). One of the surviving crewmembers died six months later in the crash of an ALI Douglas C47 at Milano airport. On 4 May 1949, a chartered Avio Linee Italiane G.212, carrying the Torino football first team squad, the Grande Torino, back home from a match in Lisbon, crashed into a hill at Superga, near Turin, killing all 31 aboard, including the 18 players.

New G.212s were also purchased by the Egyptian airline SAIDE, which received three aircraft in 1948, and the French airline Cie Air Transport. Four of the Avio Linee Italiane aircraft were sold to Ali Flotte Riunite, one of which was sold again to the Kuwaiti airline Arabian Desert Airlines.

As well as the G.212CA prototype, the Italian Air Force acquired six G.212CPs, two of which were converted to flying classrooms for training purposes as G.212AV (Aula Volante). One of these aircraft is preserved at the Italian Air Force Museum at Vigna di Valle, near Rome.

== Variants ==
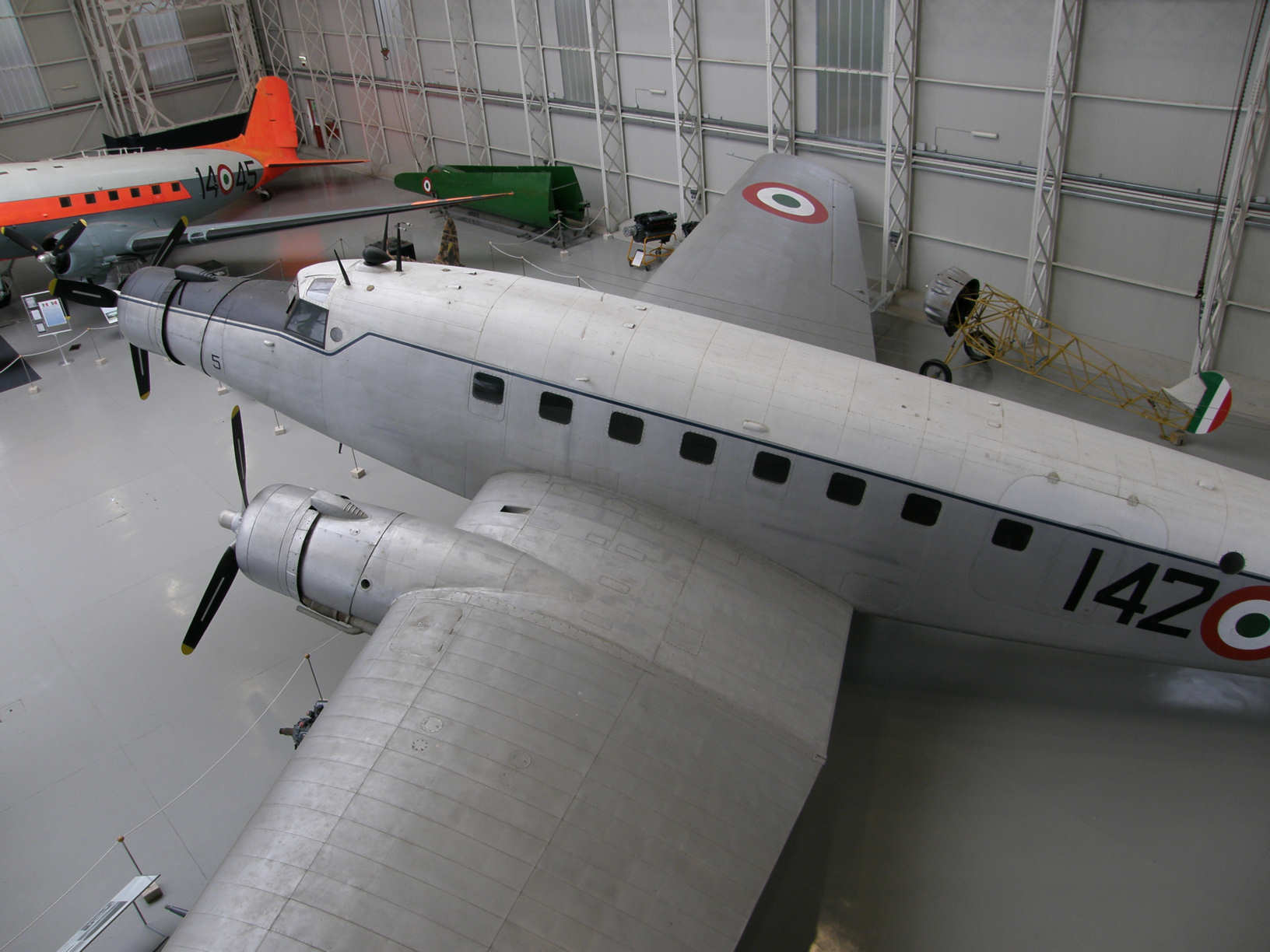
Fiat G.212 at the Italian Air Force Museum

G.212CA
The first prototype of the G.212 family.
G.212CP
The first production series civil airliners.
G.212TP
Freight transports for civil and military use.
G.212AV
(Aula Volante) Navigation training aircraft; six G.212CPs fitted out as flying classrooms for the Italian Air Force.

== Operators ==
=== Civil ===
Egypt

- SAIDE - Services Aériens Internationaux d'Egypte

France

- Compagnie Air Transport

Italy

- Ali Flotte Riunite
- Avio Linee Italiane

Kuwait

- Arabian Desert Airlines

=== Military ===
Italy

- Italian Air Force operated 11 Fiat G.212 from 1949 until 1952

== Specifications (G.212CP) ==
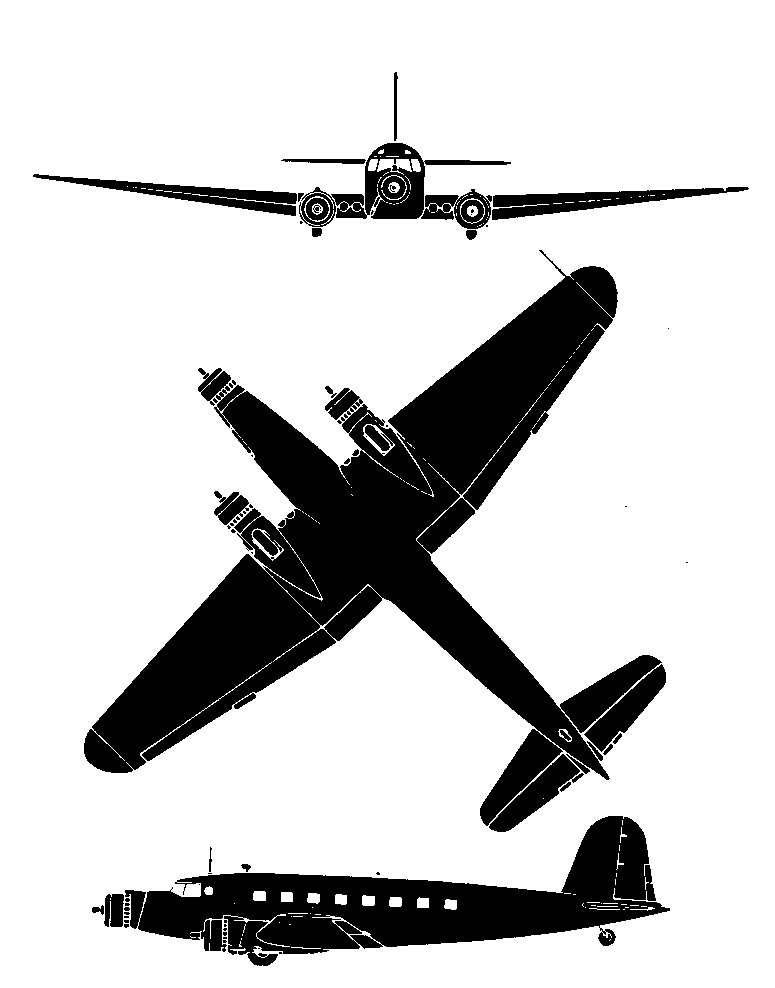

Data from Post War Propliners : Fiat G.12 and G.212

General characteristics

- Crew: 3 (two pilots, radio operator)
- Capacity: 34 passengers
- Length: 23.06 m (75 ft 8 in)
- Wingspan: 29.34 m (96 ft 3 in)
- Height: 8.14 m (26 ft 8 in)
- Wing area: 116.6 m^{2} (1,255 sq ft)
- Empty weight: 11,223 kg (24,742 lb)
- Gross weight: 17,436 kg (38,440 lb)
- Powerplant: 3 × Pratt & Whitney R-1830-S1C3-G Twin Wasp 14-cylinder two-row air-cooled radial engine, 794 kW (1,065 hp) each at 2,300 m (7,500 ft)

906 kW (1,215 hp) for take-off

- Propellers: 3-bladed constant-speed propellers

Performance

- Maximum speed: 380 km/h (240 mph, 210 kn) at 3,700 m (12,100 ft)
- Cruise speed: 300 km/h (190 mph, 160 kn)
- Range: 3,001 km (1,865 mi, 1,620 nmi)
- Service ceiling: 7,500 m (24,600 ft)
- Wing loading: 150 kg/m^{2} (31 lb/sq ft)
- Power/mass: 0.14 kW/kg (0.085 hp/lb)

== See also ==
Related development

- Fiat G.12
