= Fiat A.74 =

1930s Italian piston aircraft engine

A.74
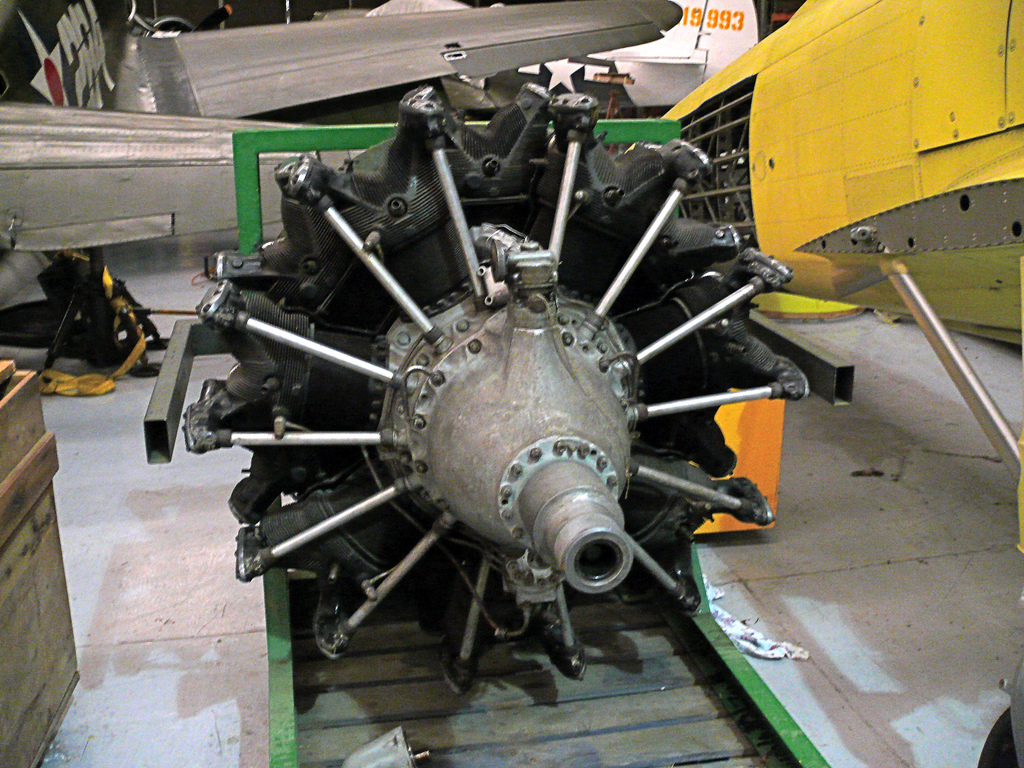
- Preserved Fiat A.74 R.I.C.38 engine
- Type: Radial engine
- National origin: Kingdom of Italy
- Manufacturer: Fiat
- First run: 1937
- Major applications: Fiat CR.42 Falco; Fiat G.50 Freccia; Macchi C.200 Saetta
- Developed into: Fiat A.80

The Fiat A.74 was a two-row, fourteen-cylinder, air-cooled radial engine produced in Italy in the 1930s as a powerplant for aircraft. It was used in some of Italy's most important aircraft of World War II.

== Design and development ==
The A.74 marked a transition for Fiat from liquid-cooled inline engines, to large air-cooled radial engines. Fiat had made a number of smaller radial air engines over the years but the A.74 marked a major increase in power and size. The A.74 family was widely produced and spawned a number of related engines such as the A.76, A.80, and A.82, each successive generation being larger and more powerful than the previous. The entire series grew from 14 cylinders to 18 cylinders with a power output of 870 hp to 1,400 hp.

== Variants ==
A.74 R.C.18
With reduction gear and supercharger, rated altitude 1,800 m (5,900 ft).
A.74 R.C.38
With reduction gear and supercharger, rated altitude 3,800 m (12,500 ft).
A.74 R.C.38D
A.74 R.C.38S
A.74 R.I.C.38
With reduction gear, fuel injection and supercharger, rated altitude 3,800 m (12,500 ft).
A.74 R.C.42
With reduction gear and supercharger, rated altitude 4,200 m (13,800 ft).

== Applications ==
- CANSA FC.20
- Fiat CR.42
- Fiat G.50
- Fiat RS.14
- Ikarus Orkan
- IMAM Ro.57
- Macchi C.200

== Specifications (A.74) ==
Data from A.74 engine manual

=== General characteristics ===
- Type: 14-cylinder air-cooled radial
- Bore: 140 mm (5.512 in)
- Stroke: 145 mm (5.709 in)
- Displacement: 31.25 L (1,906.9 cu in)
- Length: 1,044mm (41.13 in)
- Diameter: 1,195 mm (47.05 in)
- Dry weight: 590 kg (1,246 lb)

=== Components ===
- Valvetrain: One intake and one sodium-cooled exhaust valve per cylinder
- Fuel system: 1 Stromberg carburettor
- Fuel type: 87 octane
- Cooling system: air-cooled

=== Performance ===
- Power output: 870 cv (858 hp, 640 kW) at 2,520 rpm at sea level (take-off power); 960 cv (947 hp, 706 kW) at 2520 rpm at 3,000 m (Emergency power)
- Compression ratio: 6.7:1
- Power-to-weight ratio: 1.2 kW/kg (0.73 hp/lb)

== See also ==
Related development

- Fiat A.80

Comparable engines

- Alfa Romeo 135
- BMW 801
- Bristol Hercules
- Gnome-Rhône 14N
- Mitsubishi Kinsei
- Nakajima Sakae
- Piaggio P.XI
- Piaggio P.XIX
- Pratt & Whitney R-1830 Twin Wasp
- Shvetsov ASh-82
- Tumansky M-88

Related lists

- List of aircraft engines
