= CANT Z.505 =

Z.505
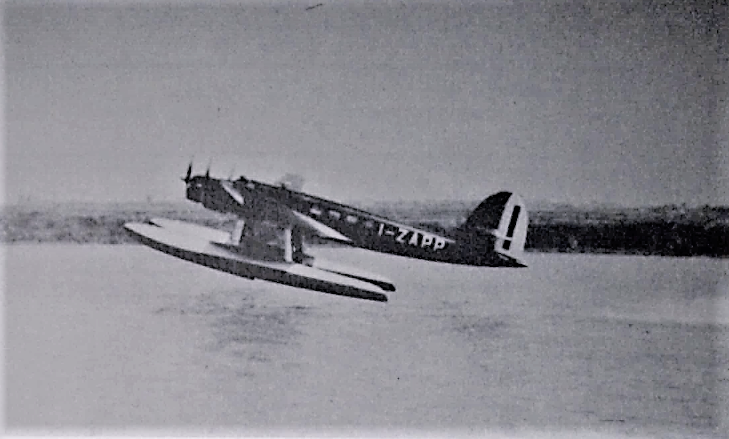
- Cant Z.505 taking off

General information
- Type: Floatplane airliner/mail transport
- Manufacturer: CANT
- Designer: Filippo Zappata
- Primary user: Regia Aeronautica
- Number built: 1

History
- First flight: 10 July 1935
- Retired: 27 July 1941

The CANT Z.505 was a prototype trimotor transport floatplane built by CANT in the 1930s.

== Development ==
In 1934 the airline Ala Littoria issued a specification for the supply of a new scheduled seaplane to be used on its commercial routes by sea. The CRDA took part in the competition with a project entrusted to the engineer Filippo Zappata who designed a low-wing monoplane, a three-engine with boot configuration, moving away from the central hull configuration typical of the CNT/CANT production until then.

The first flight took place on 10 July 1935. Tests of the aircraft revealed insufficient engine power, unable to provide design characteristics. The aircraft was also paid attention to by assigning the registration number MM.268 to it. Not having achieved good performance from the seaplane, the company decided to test the Z.505 on a conventional wheeled chassis. Held in parallel with the CANT Z.1011, tests showed that in this form the aircraft would clearly not cause any interest among customers. The Z.505 was eventually used as a mail-plane from 1936, having receiving the registration number I-ZAPP (in honor of its designer). In 1938, it was transferred to Comando Aeronautica dell Egeo where it was used as the personal aircraft of the governor Cesare Maria de Vecchi (changing the registration number to I-VACI), where the aircraft was operated until the summer of 1941.

== Specifications ==
Data from Airwar :CANT Z.505, Italian Civil and Military Aircraft 1930–1945

General characteristics

- Crew: 4
- Capacity: 8 passengers or mail freight
- Length: 18.75 m (61 ft 6 in)
- Wingspan: 28.3 m (92 ft 10 in)
- Height: 7.5 m (24 ft 7 in)
- Empty weight: 8,170 kg (18,012 lb)
- Gross weight: 12,794 kg (28,207 lb)
- Powerplant: 3 × Isotta Fraschini Asso XI R.2C.16 V-12 liquid-cooled piston engines, 630 kW (840 hp) each
- Propellers: 2-bladed variable-pitch propellers

Performance

- Maximum speed: 325 km/h (202 mph, 175 kn)
- Cruise speed: 290 km/h (180 mph, 160 kn)
- Range: 3,500 km (2,200 mi, 1,900 nmi)
- Service ceiling: 5,000 m (16,000 ft)

== See also ==
Related lists

- List of flying boats and floatplanes
