= Red Tent (shelter) =

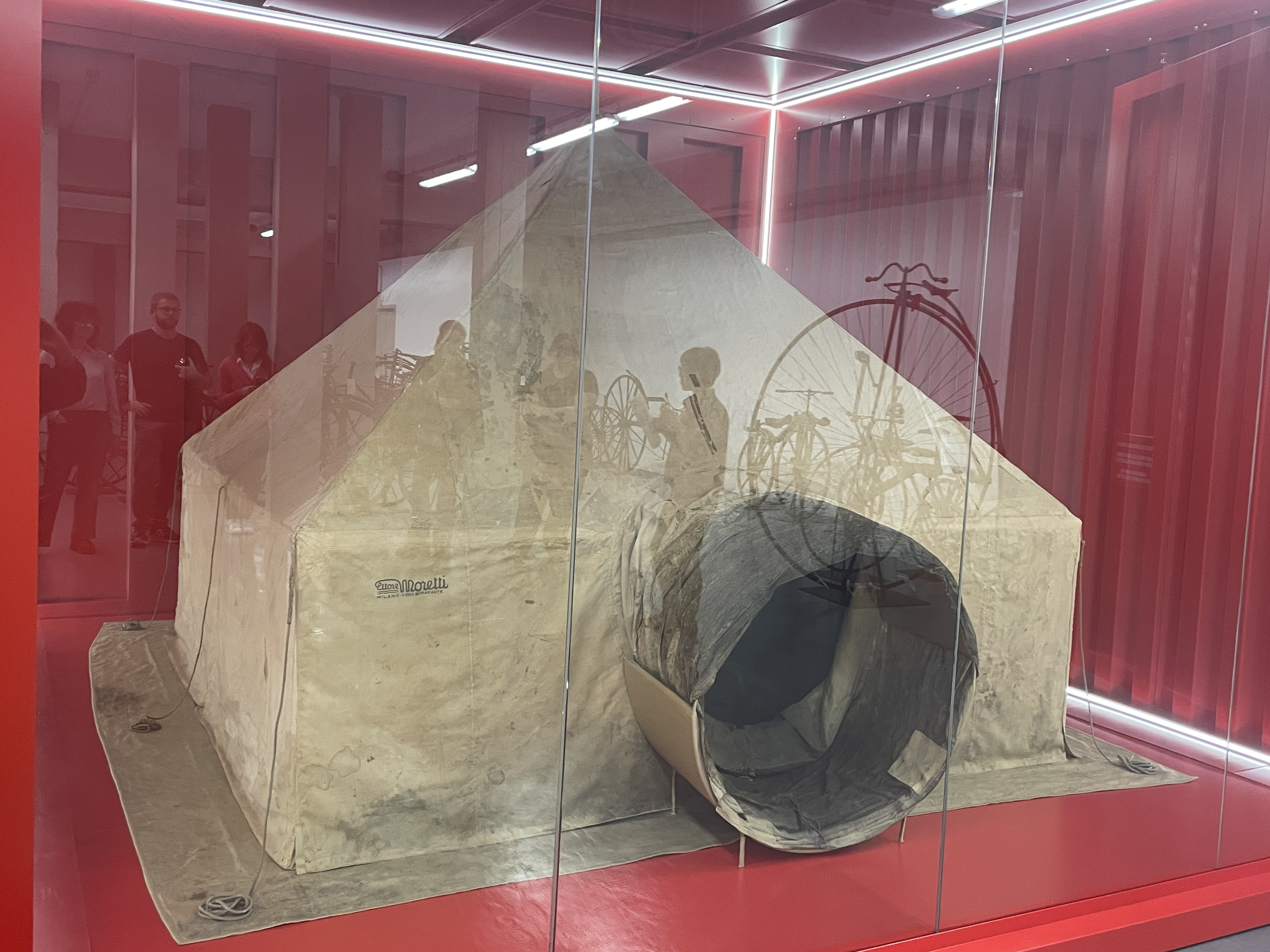
The Red Tent in the National Museum of Science and Technology Leonardo da Vinci

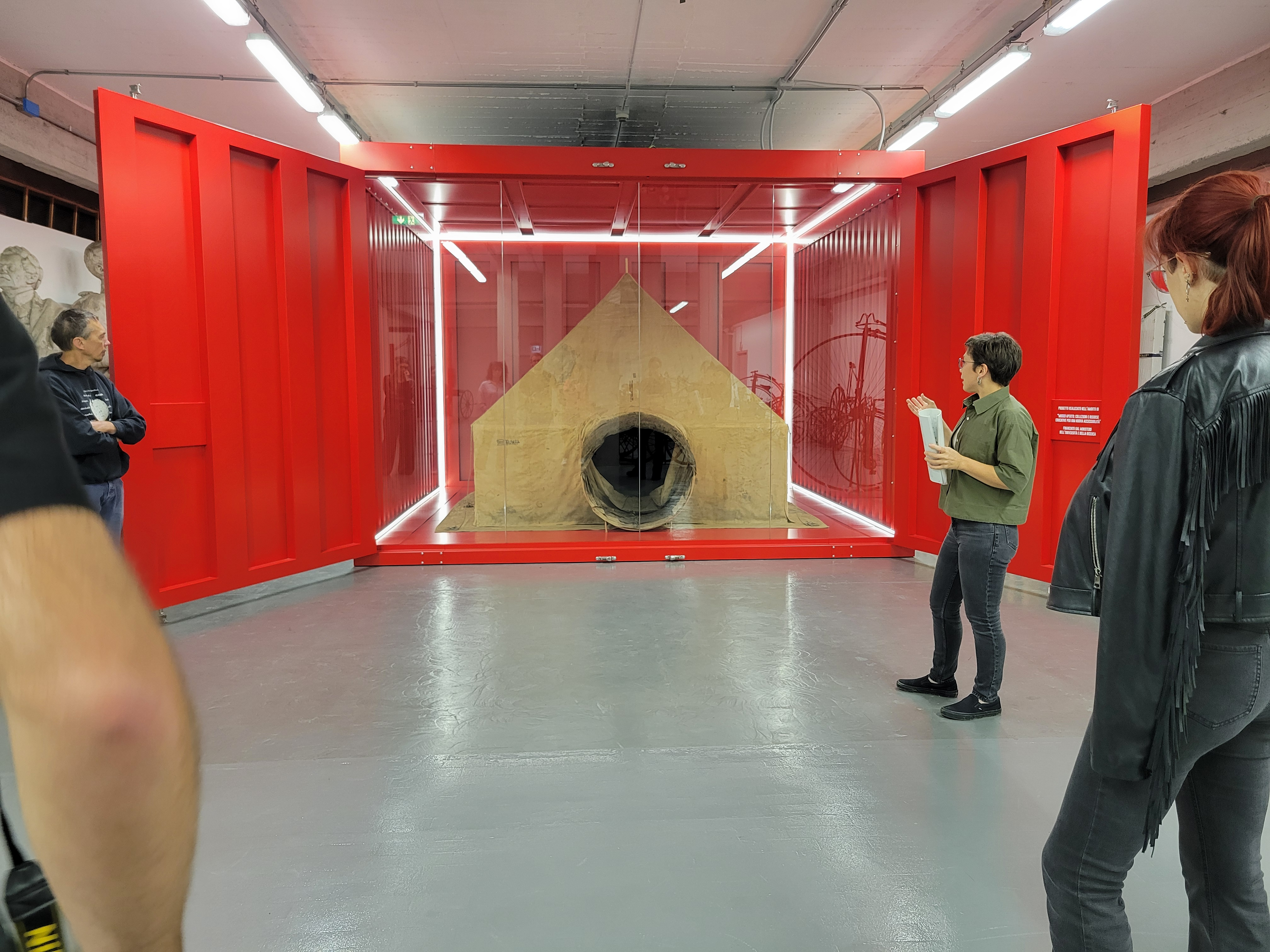
The tent is preserved in a climate-controlled, resealable container with a transparent wall.

The Red Tent was the tent in which survivors of the airship Italia took shelter after it crashed onto the ice pack in the Arctic at around 10:33 AM on 25 May 1928, until the time of their rescue on 12 July by the Soviet ice breaker Krasin.

== History ==
The Red Tent was designed by engineer Felice Trojani as part of the emergency equipment for the crew preparing to land near the North Pole. Among the equipment was also the Ondina 33 radio, which allowed radio operator Giuseppe Biagi to first send an SOS and later guide the rescuers to the survivors’ location. The tent's design followed a careful study of those used in earlier polar expeditions and was manufactured by the Moretti Company in Milan.

The tent was of a central-type design, with a parallelepiped base measuring 2.75 × 2.75 meters and 1 meter high, topped with a pyramidal section that peaked roughly 1 meter above the base. Access was provided through a circular entrance one meter in diameter, sealed with a windshield sleeve. The exterior walls and base were made of undyed raw silk, while the interior walls were lined with blue silk—a color chosen as a preventative against snow blindness.

Though designed to accommodate a maximum of four people, the Red Tent ultimately sheltered nine occupants—including two injured men, Umberto Nobile and Natale Cecioni—along with Titina the Fox Terrier (the expedition’s unofficial mascot), a portion of the radio equipment, and the batteries that powered it. After retrieving the tent from the wreckage scattered across the ice, Trojani set it up while Mariano and Viglieri drove picks into the ice and secured the guy lines, anchoring the edges with recovered supplies and other available weights. At the base, they stored cartons containing navigation charts and the expedition’s only surviving sleeping bag. This bag was cut open to serve as bedding for the wounded Cecioni and Nobile, placed near the cookstove.

Due to the unreliability of altimeters at the time, the crew used a more effective method to estimate the airship's altitude: from the cabin, they dropped glass vials filled with fuchsin dye, timing the fall with a specialized stopwatch made in Rome by Hausmann. The time it took from release to impact helped estimate the height, while the broken vials stained the snow red.

To make the tent visible from the air, the survivors used these dye vials to mark red lines on the ice. Once radio communication was established, rescuers became aware of the colored markings. Journalists later dubbed the shelter the “Red Tent.” However, under the relentless light of the Arctic summer, the delicate aniline dye quickly faded, and the tent returned to its original undyed appearance.

The Red Tent, along with Einar Lundborg’s airplane and all the remaining camp equipment, was recovered by the Krasin’s crew. Upon returning to Italy, Umberto Nobile donated the tent to the City of Milan, which had sponsored the expedition. The city dedicated it to the Museum at Castello Sforzesco—now the National Museum of Science and Technology Leonardo da Vinci—where Felice Trojani assembled it one final time. The Red Tent remained on public display until the mid-1990s and is currently awaiting a long and delicate restoration to once again be exhibited.
