= Gnome-Rhône 18L =

R-18 aircraft piston engine

18L
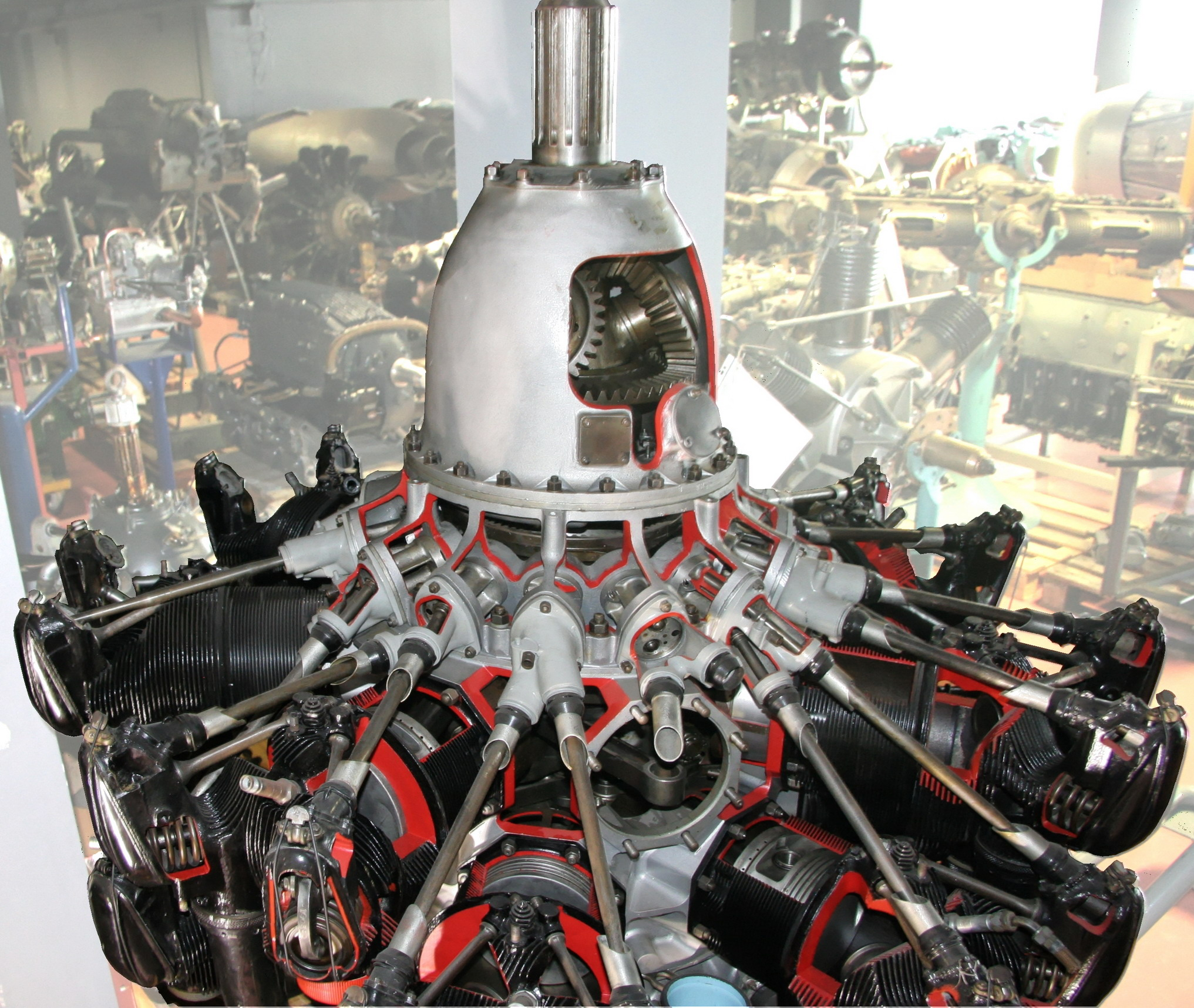
- Type: Radial engine
- National origin: France
- Manufacturer: Gnome et Rhône

The Gnome-Rhône 18L was a French-designed twin-row 18-cylinder air-cooled radial engine. The 18L was a large step up in terms of displacement, power and number of cylinders. The majority of engines made by Gnome et Rhône were either 7, 9 or 14 cylinders. The engine was never put into series production due to the negligible market interest and the company's concentration on the production of 14-cylinder engines, which very quickly approached the performance of the larger model. However, the 18-cylinder model was further developed in the versions 18P with a two-speed compressor (1650 cv, 2400 rpm) and 18R with a central bearing (2150 cv, 2500 rpm), the latter variant achieved in tests in 1946 a power of 2400 cv at 2600 rpm. Eventually SNECMA (the successor of Gnome et Rhône) undertook licensed production of the Bristol Hercules engine instead.

== Specifications (Gnome Rhone 18L-00) ==
Data from Flight:POWER at the SALON

=== General characteristics ===
- Type: 18-cylinder twin-row air-cooled radial engine
- Bore: 146 mm (5.7 in)
- Stroke: 180 mm (7.1 in)
- Displacement: 54.2 L (3,310 cu in)
- Height: 1,400 mm (55 in)
- Dry weight: 736 kg (1,623 lb)

=== Components ===
- Valvetrain: 1 inlet and 1 exhaust valve per cylinder
- Supercharger: Yes
- Fuel system: 1 Bronzania Carburetor
- Fuel type: 87 octane
- Cooling system: air
- Reduction gear: 0.684:1

=== Performance ===
- Power output: 970 kW (1,300 hp) at 2,170 rpm at 3,400 m (11,000 ft); 1,000 kW (1,400 hp) max
- Compression ratio: 5.5:1
- Power-to-weight ratio: 0.8 hp/lb at cruise speed

== See also ==
Comparable engines

- Alfa Romeo 135
- BMW 802
- Bristol Centaurus
- Fiat A.82
- Piaggio P.XII
- Nakajima Homare
- Pratt & Whitney R-2800 Double Wasp
- Tumansky M-90
- Wright R-3350 Duplex-Cyclone

Related lists

- List of aircraft engines
