= CANT Z.1018 Leone =

Italian medium bomber

Z.1018 Leone

General information
- Type: Medium bomber/night fighter
- Manufacturer: CANT
- Designer: Filippo Zappata
- Primary user: Regia Aeronautica
- Number built: 15

History
- First flight: 9 October 1939

The CRDA CANT Z.1018 Leone (Lion) was an Italian medium bomber of the 1940s.

== Design and development ==
In 1939, the Regia Aeronautica (Italian Air Force) initiated its R Plan, or 3,000 airplanes, a campaign to quickly increase its strength with modern aircraft. By that time, Regia Aeronautica had been involved in wars on two continents, and its equipment had been depleted and had not kept up with technological advances.

As a part of this plan, a competition for a modern medium bomber was announced in 1939. CRDA submitted its Z.1015 for this competition. The Z.1015 was basically an all-metal version of the Z.1007, a three-engine medium bomber with a wooden airframe. The Z.1007 had first flown in 1937 but had not yet entered military service by 1939.

Regia Aeronautica requested Zappata's proposal be modified to incorporate greater strength: the design ultimate load factor was to be increased from 7.0 to 10.0. Zappata determined that such a change would require significant re-engineering and increased weight, and countered with a proposal for a new two-engine aircraft, the Z.1018.

The three engines of the Z.1007 had a combined power output of 2,237 kW (3,000 hp), whereas the two engines proposed for the Z.1018 Alfa Romeo 135 RC.32 had a combined output of 2,088 kW (2,800 hp). Thus its performance would be comparable to the proposed Z.1015 with simpler construction, possible lower weight, and reduced maintenance.

Zappata proposed three variants of the basic aircraft, using different wing planforms:

- High-speed bomber, equipped with a wing of 50 m^{2} (532 ft^{2}) area;
- Higher-capacity bomber, equipped with a wing of 63 m^{2} (678 ft^{2}) area;
- High-altitude bomber, equipped with a wing of 72 m^{2} (775 ft^{2}) area.

The new design also offered the possibility of carrying an internal torpedo, which would have been impossible with the Z.1015 fuselage layout.

CANT proposed a floatplane version of the Z.1018, designated the Z.514, which would have used the floats from the Z.506 (the 500 designations were for floatplanes while the 1000 designations were for landplanes). On 23 February 1939, the Regia authorized production of 32 Z.1018 aircraft, but stipulated an ultimate load factor of 9.0, and also demanded construction of a prototype, and further required that production deliveries begin before the end of the year. This would have been an extraordinarily rapid development schedule, so CRDA objected. The proposed engines had not yet been certificated, and its counter-rotating version had not yet been developed.

Construction of the first prototype was authorized on 7 April 1939. In July 1939, Regia requested that the design be altered to use the new Daimler-Benz DB 601 water-cooled inline engine instead of the planned radial engine.

The aircraft, in its definitive form (as the Leone I) was a two-engine medium bomber, with a single tail, retractable undercarriage, and metallic structure. It had duralumin structure, a skin of light alloy, and a crew of four or five. The contours of the slim fuselage were designed for aerodynamic benefit. As with the Z.1007, the two pilots were in tandem, not side by side. Only the first pilot had a complete set of controls, while the copilot had limited visibility and only a few instruments.

Its wing was straight-tapered, with rounded wingtips. The low wing incorporated two structural spars. The wing was metal-covered forward and fabric-covered aft. In spite of efforts to reduce the airframe weight, the empty weight of the prototype was comparable to the three-engine Z.1007.

Engines for the Z.1018 prototype were Piaggio P.XII-RC.35 air-cooled radials with 18 cylinders in two rows, rated at 895 kW (1,200 hp) for takeoff and 1,007 kW (1,350 hp) at 3,500 m (11,480 ft) altitude, at 2,050 rpm. Their dry weight was 930 kg/2,050 lb (940 kg/2,070 lb with oil), and they used 87 octane fuel. Propellers were metal three-blade variable-pitch Alfa Romeos.

Using this powerplant, CANT engineers calculated a top speed for the Z.1018 of 524 km/h (326 mph) at 4,500 m (14,764 ft), with a takeoff run of 354 m (1,160 ft), landing run of 462 m (1,518 ft), and a climb to 4,000 m (13,120 ft) in 7 minutes 32 seconds (14 minutes 4 seconds to 6,000 m/19,685 ft).

Design fuel capacity was 3,300 L (870 US gal) in wing-mounted self-sealing fuel tanks. A possible modification was offered – a 500 L (130 US gal) auxiliary fuel tank in the aft fuselage. Calculated endurance with standard tanks was about three hours, for 1,335 km (830 mi) range (using calculated maximum cruise speed). Endurance and range using economical cruise speeds are not available, but should have been better. For example, the Savoia-Marchetti SM.79 Sparviero could boost its range from 1,750 km (1,090 mi) at 350 km/h (220 mph) to 2,300 km (1,430 mi) at 260 km/h (160 mph).

Proposed armament was twelve 100 kg (220 lb) bombs carried in the internal bomb bay. Wing hardpoints were provided capable of carrying 1,000 kg (2,200 lb) each. Two such external weapons could be carried, since the calculated payload (difference between empty weight and maximum operating weight) was 2,700 kg (5,950 lb). For comparison, the Fiat BR.20 and Savoia-Marchetti SM.79 both had a 3,600 kg (7,940 lb) payload, and the CANT Z.1007 payload was over 4,000 kg (8,820 lb).

This calculated Z.1018 payload was barely enough for takeoff with full fuel and crew (2,800 kg/6,1703 lb), so it would not allow for any weapon load. A possible explanation is that the prototype was never flight-tested at its maximum capacity including weapon load.

Defensive armament for the Z.1018 consisted of four machine-guns:

- Breda-SAFAT (12.7 mm/.5 in) in a Caproni-Lanciani belly turret;
- Scotti (12.7 mm/.303 in) in an upper turret;
- (Two) Breda-SAFAT (7.7 mm/.303 in) in fuselage side openings.

In addition, a fixed Breda-SAFAT (7.7 mm/.303 in) machine gun was mounted in the right wing, to be used for ground attack or straight-ahead defense. Ammunition to be provided was 350 rpg for each 12.7 mm (.5 in) gun and 500 rounds for each 7.7 mm (.303 in) gun. The upper turret was troublesome to install, and was finally mounted in a partially retracted position, which prevented a full field of fire.

The added weight of these guns adversely impacted the aircraft's performance. In addition, in retrospect the inclusion of a fixed forward-firing gun on a fast bomber appears to have been unnecessary.

Other systems on board were oxygen cylinders, radios, fire extinguishers and a photographic machine.

The first prototype flew on 9 October 1939. By the end of 1939, this aircraft had logged only 10 hours of flight, due to the unreliable engines. This was not sufficient to adequately evaluate the design, so in March 1940, the engines were replaced with Piaggio P.XII radial engines with three-blade propellers, with improved engine nacelles and propeller spinners.

On 25 May 1940, the prototype flew to Guidonia Montecelio for flight testing. The program was well behind the original schedule at that point; Regia had planned on placing the first 32 machines of the type in service by the end of 1939. Instead, Mario Stoppani and then Adriano Mantelli only flew the prototype. Stoppani made the delivery flight; Mantelli performed the flight tests. He reported an overall good impression, but not outstanding.

In December 1940, Regia Aeronautica specified that the Z.1018 be constructed with a double tail, but in May 1942 the requirement was changed back to the originally envisioned single tail. During this period, Regia also required the addition of dive brakes, increased armament, engine type changes and several other changes.

In the meantime, the test activity continued. The prototype was tested with the P.XII engines, and thanks to the absolute lack of military systems on board, it reached good speeds: at 4,200 m (13,780 ft), the Z.1018 reached 514 km/h (319 mph), equalling the Reggiane Re.2000 that was also undergoing flight evaluation there.

This aircraft had replaced the engines, but the Piaggio P.XII also suffered problems (in fact they were affected for years by many problems).

The verdict of Mantelli was not encouraging: the 'future bomber' Leone was not enough of an improvement to justify its replacing the CANT Z.1007, which was already in production for Regia Aereonautica. A measure of the delays which this program suffered is given by the fact that, in spite of pressures caused by the war being waged at that time, it had taken six months to complete the proof-of-concept aircraft, and a true prototype would still have to be constructed in order to verify the adequacy of the basic design.

Finally, the configuration of this aircraft was fixed, almost 2 years after its first-projected entry into service.

The final Z.1018 configuration is considered by some to be the most attractive of all the Italian aircraft, with its line so slim and well shaped.

=== Experimental service ===
With over a year of delay, 100 units of the CANT Z.1018 were finally ordered on 31 October 1940. However, on 26 December an additional order was placed for 10 units of pre-series aircraft. Due to problems arising from introduction of the all-metal airframe, the 10 pre-series aircraft were specified to be constructed of wood. Similarly to the Soviet Ilyushin Il-2 "Shturmovik", the plane was constructed with a hybrid wood-metal construction. This mixed construction required additional considerations to be made, since wood and metal structures have very different properties and are thus difficult to integrate into a single airframe. But Zappata was a specialist in wooden structures, and his Z.1007 was already in production with wood construction, so this eased the challenge.

In addition to this metal-to-wood conversion challenge, the continual government requests for modifications and improvements slowed production. Finally on 5 December 1941, the first (MM.24290) wooden pre-series unit made its maiden flight.

The two-year program delay meant that the pre-series aircraft were competing with upgraded versions of the CANT Z.1007, the "Ter". With continuous delays and change of priorities, 15 January 1942 saw the decision to produce only three bombers: the CANT Z.1007 and Z.1018, and the Piaggio P.108. At that time, General Bruno specified that the first 100 examples of the Z.1018 must be in service by 1943.

The first wooden example was tested for almost all of 1942, reaching a level speed 524 km/h (326 mph) despite the much heavier weight, mainly because of its improved aerodynamics. Due to the 2,013 kW (2,700 hp) installed power, it reached 6,000 m (19,690 ft) altitude in 14 minutes 4 seconds (lightly loaded).

Even so, the flight characteristics were not totally satisfactory. The aircraft was characterized by good ground handling, good takeoff and landing, but the pilot's cockpit was set too low in the fuselage and at an excessive height from the ground, so the visibility was not good. In flight, the aircraft was quite stable, but vibrations occurred at high speed in turbulence, and control response was considered sluggish. Also, the first series example was affected by several problems of tail vibration and even poorer control response. The maximum speed of the series examples was inferior to the prototype. Several of the pre-series aircraft suffered landing accidents, which although not serious further delayed the project's development.

Other experiments were made with several Z.1018s. Yet by 10 May 1943, when Tunis was falling to Allied forces and the African war was almost over (13 May), only 10 units had been completed, several of which were incomplete or had been damaged during testing (including testing for torpedo carriage and launch).

On 7 July 1943, the Italian 262 squadron, 107th Group, 47th Wing, received the first two pre-series aircraft to be placed in service, and later received another pre-series aircraft that had been damaged by a landing accident during flight testing. By September 1943, only one pre-series Z.1018 aircraft was still in service, and no Z.1018 had seen combat.

On 8 August 1943, a pre-series Z.1018 crashed near Perugia, killing its pilot, Enzo Bravi.

Meanwhile, the first metallic Z.1018s were completed. The first unit (MM.507) was completed on 22 September 1942, but the lack of engines and other equipment hampered the effort to complete the first order of 100 units. The first two metal units completed were interesting: MM.24824 was the heavy nightfighter version, and MM.24826 was the torpedo version. MM.24824 was exceptionally well armed, with four 20 mm MG 151 (800 rpg) and four Breda 12.7 mm/.5 in (1,400 rpg) in the nose and the wings. Also radar was specified for this aircraft, the German FuG 202. Italians, meanwhile, managed to produce the Argo, a radar capable of locking onto naval targets, and an aircraft version, the Vespa (or Arghetto), smaller but still capable of being used to hunt naval targets. The final result of this effort was the Lepre, an air interceptor radar, the ultimate radar developed in Italy during the war. None of them was fitted on the Z.1018 night fighter, which never was completely outfitted for combat.

MM.24824 had a powerful weaponry, both in firepower and number of rounds carried. This was a great improvement compared to the early Italian fighters, but this was a big and heavy aircraft, a medium bomber, so the space and payload was not a problem, just as with the German Dornier Do 217, one of the similar aircraft developed in the rest of the world, and which had been sent to Regia Aereonautica in small numbers. After a brief evaluation in a squadron, MM.24824 was caught by surprise by the armistice in CRDA and captured by Germans, but was not employed and did not survive the war.

MM.24826 was tested with torpedoes, followed by two other examples, in Gorizia, in the local torpedo aircraft training unit. The aircraft showed itself as fully capable to perform this task but the two examples were not employed (the other was damaged by an accident on the ground).

During this time, Zappata noted that CRDA was saturated with production of all his projects, so he moved to Breda, which was idle after the failure of its Ba.88.

At Breda, Zappata proposed several variants of the Z.1018 metallic:

- BZ.301 (Breda-Zappata, mod.301), high altitude bomber;
- BZ.302, high altitude fighter;
- BZ.303, night fighter, torpedo bomber multirole;
- BZ.304, anti-tank (perhaps with a 37 mm gun).

The Italian Air Ministry authorized only the BZ.301 and 303, called Leone II and Leone III. The wingspan was altered for these variants: 24 m/79 ft (BZ.301); 20.7 m/68 ft (BZ.303).

The BZ.303 project carried the best armament of Italian aircraft programs. It had eight 20 mm MG 151 (200 rpg), four in the wings and four in the nose (plus a 12.7 mm/.5 in gun in the dorsal position). It had radar and two Piaggio P XV RC60 engines of 1,081 kW (1,450 hp). Another version was provided with two DB 603 engines, and was called BZ303bis. In September 1943, there were contracts for several of these "new generation Leoni". At this point, Germany took over control of both Italian industries involved, CRDA and Breda.

Germans were involved already in the summer of 1943 in the testing of new Italian aircraft. They liked G.55s and were interested to have deliveries of them by Fiat. They tested other Italian aircraft, even Z.1018. Sadly for CRDA they did not have a good opinion of the Leone, claiming that it was not better than the already obsolete Ju 88A-4 and even inferior to the Z.1007ter. The Italian plans to produce bombers were severely weakened by this decision. Germans offered their Me 410 or Ju 188 in exchange for Italian G.55s, in the process giving Italy worthless aircraft in exchange for airplanes which would be valuable in defense of Germany. The removal of Benito Mussolini on 25 July and the Armistice stopped these plans. The Germans took control of all Italian industries in central and north Italy.

The Germans allowed both CRDA and Breda to continue the production for 28 examples each, out of 200 ordered in two series. CRDA was destroyed by allied bombings and so, its final result was: 95 examples were committed to the production lines, 28 of them were authorized to be completed, two were completed and taken by Germans, then sent to Germany where they were lost in unknown conditions. Four others were destroyed by bombings and the rest of all the machines were demolished as Germans ordered. Breda was in similar condition, with the assembly lines destroyed on 30 April 1944 by aerial bombing and also in this occasion Germans ordered the demolition of all the hardware. Photos of fuselages were made; their metallic construction was evidenced by the lack of painting. This was the definite end for Z.1018/BZ.300s.

== The causes of the Leone's failure ==
All in all, the CANT Z.1018 Leone was an overall an improvement over the CANT Z.1007, mainly thanks to the two-engine configuration, but the program was hampered by continuous alteration requests made by Regia Aeronautica.

But there were also technical shortcomings:

- The fuselage was too narrow to adequately accommodate its defensive armament;
- Tailplane vibration;
- The flight deck was poorly situated for landing visibility;
- The added weight of a copilot was unjustified, since the copilot had limited visibility and insufficient controls;
- Frequent mechanical failures;
- Inability to successfully absorb the modifications requested by Regia Aeronautica;
- Engines that were never adequately reliable.

The engines were the most persistent problem. Many of them, made by Alfa, Piaggio, Fiat and others, were proposed for a machine that never reached production (in all, about 17 units were completed).

The Z.1007 was judged better, or at least as satisfactory, than its supposed replacement, the Z.1018, not without reasons: The Z.1007e had three 746 kW (1,000 hp) for a total of 2,237 kW (3,000 hp), 224 kW (300 hp) more than Z.1018. With the Ter version, the power was even higher, with a total maximum of 2,573–2,685 kW (3,450–3,600 hp), almost 746 kW (1,000 hp) more than Z.1018. The maximum speed of Z.1007 (490 km/h/300 mph) was significantly lower due to greater drag, but its 50% greater payload and greater probability of returning home with a damaged engine made it the preferred choice. More importantly, the 746 kW (1,000 hp) engines were reasonably reliable, more so than the 1,044 kW (1,400 hp) class used on the Z.1018.

By 1942, the improved Z.1007 (Ter) was becoming available, while design revisions and production delays impeded the Z.1008. Like Ju 188, Tu-2, Do 217, Ki-49 and 67 (this latter the most similar to Z.1018) these aircraft of new generation, born just at the beginning of the war, failed to show themselves enough better than the previous bombers to easily substitute them, especially if compared with the most advanced versions of the earlier-generation aircraft.

One reason was the continuous demand for 'improvements' that led to delays and errors (see Heinkel He 177 as example).

The small Italian industrial base, and the quick decay of the military effort, made the situation even worse.

So the Z.1018, theoretically ready for production, arguably, not before the end of 1941, was never a success. The presence of the Z.1007ter in fact killed the program at least in the last year of war, before armistice. Even so, the manufacturing rate of CRDA was only 15 aircraft per month, and its engines were too unreliable and manufactured too slowly by the industries involved.

== Production ordered ==
All the series of Z.1018 Leone were:

- Series I: 10 Z.1018A wooden aircraft, MM.24290-24299, CRDA 26.12.1940
- Series II: 100 Z.1018 Leone I, metallic aircraft, MM.24824-24.923, CRDA 31.10.1940
- Series III: 100 Z.1018 Leone I, metallic, MM.25162-25261, Aeritalia 16.5.1942, canceled 25.1.1943
- Series IV: 100 Leone I, metallic, MM.25264-24363, Breda 8.7.1941
- Series V: 200 Leone I; 26272–26471, Piaggio 29.1.1943, canceled March 1943
- Series VI: 300 Leone I, MM 25648–25947, Breda 29.1.1943
- Series VII: 300 Leone I, MM.25948-26247, CRDA 29.1.1943

Total built, around 17 (10 wooden-made). This modest amount was the only result of the programs made by Regia Aeronautica to upgrade her bomber fleet.

== Chronology ==
- 1939, early: request for 32 Z.1015
- 23 February, request shifted to 32 Z.1018
- 7 April: authorization for the proof-of-concept machine
- 9 October: first flight of POC prototype, with Alfa Romeo engines
- 1940, March: Installed P.XII engines in POC prototype
- 25 May- (early 1941): tests at Guidonia
- 31 October: first 100 Leone I ordered (metal airframe)
- 26 Dec:10 Leone with wooden airframe ordered
- 1941, 5 Dec : first wooden Leone flew
- 1942: year devoted to changes, discussions, trials of the first examples. Zappata went to Breda and began design of BZ series.
- 22 Sept: the first Leone I metallic flew
- 1943, 10 May: a total of 10 Leones were completed or almost completed
- 1943, summer: Germans tested Z.1018 – deemed unsatisfactory
- 7 July, first (wooden) Leone arrived to an operational sqn
- July–August: made respectively four and three Leones, metallic version (?)
- September, 9: armistice, Germans take control of air industries
- 1944, 30 April: the bombing of Breda and the similar fate at CRDA ended the Z.1018 program

== Operators ==
Kingdom of Italy

- Regia Aeronautica
- Italian Co-Belligerent Air Force

== Specifications (Z.1018 Leone) ==
Data from Dimensione Cielo, Aerei Italiani nella 2ª Guerra Mondiale

General characteristics

- Crew: 4
- Length: 17.60 m (57 ft 9 in)
- Wingspan: 22.50 m (73 ft 10 in)
- Height: 6.10 m (20 ft 0 in)
- Wing area: 63.10 m^{2} (679.2 sq ft)
- Empty weight: 8,800 kg (19,401 lb)
- Max takeoff weight: 11,500 kg (25,353 lb)
- Fuel capacity: 3,300 L (730 imp gal; 870 US gal)
- Powerplant: 2 × Piaggio P.XII R.C.35 18 cylinder air-cooled radial piston engine, 1,010 kW (1,350 hp) each at 3,500 m (11,500 ft)
- Propellers: 3-bladed variable-pitch propellers

Performance

- Maximum speed: 524 km/h (326 mph, 283 kn) at 4,500 m (14,800 ft)
- Stall speed: 140 km/h (87 mph, 76 kn)
- Range: 1,335 km (830 mi, 721 nmi)
- Service ceiling: 7,250 m (23,790 ft)
- Time to altitude: 4,000 m (13,000 ft) in 7 minutes 34 seconds

Armament

- Guns:
- 2 × 12.7 mm (0.50 in) Breda-SAFAT machine guns (1 in wing root and one in ventral position)
- 1 × 12.7 mm (0.50 in) Scotti machine gun in dorsal turret
- 2 × 7.7 mm (0.303 in) Breda-SAFAT machine-guns in waist positions
- Bombs:
- 1,500 kg (3,300 lb) in internal bomb-bay

== See also ==
Aircraft of comparable role, configuration, and era

- CANT Z.1007 Alcione
- Dornier Do 217
- Heinkel He 111
- Ilyushin Il-4
- Junkers Ju-188
- Martin B-26 Marauder
- Mitsubishi Ki-67 Hiryū
- Savoia-Marchetti SM.79 Sparviero
- Vickers Warwick
- Vickers Wellington
- Yokosuka P1Y1 Ginga

== Bibliography ==
- Brotzu, E.; Caso, M.; Cosolo, G., eds. (1973). Dimensione Cielo, Aerei Italiani nella 2ª Guerra Mondiale: 6: Bombardieri Ricognitore (in Italian). Rome: Edizioni Bizzari.
- Garello, Giancarlo. "Il CANT Z.1018 Leone, un'occasione sprecata", Storia militare n.12, September 1994.
- Garello, Giancarlo (September 2001). "La chasse de nuit italienne (3): la méthode scientifique" [Italian Night Fighters: The Scientific Method]. Avions: Toute l'Aéronautique et son histoire (in French) (102): 9–16. ISSN 1243-8650.
- The Illustrated Encyclopedia of Aircraft (Part Work 1982–1985). London: Orbis Publishing, 1985.
- Lembo, Daniele, "Il Cant Z.1018 Leone, il progetto più bello di Filippo Zappata", edizioni Westward, Aerei nella Storia n.31 p. 8–18.
