= Tumansky M-90 =

1930s Soviet prototype aircraft piston engine

M-90
- Type: Radial engine
- National origin: Soviet Union
- Manufacturer: Factory No.29
- First run: 29 November 1939
- Number built: 20+
- Developed from: Gnome-Rhône 9K

The Tumansky M-90 was a prototype Soviet radial engine designed before World War II. It proved unreliable and incapable of reaching its designed output and was cancelled in 1944.

== Development ==
The M-90 began development in the spring of 1939 under the leadership of S. K. Tumansky as a coupled version of the 9-cylinder Gnome-Rhône 9K, which was built under license as the M-75. Later, possibly after E. V. Urmin assumed leadership of the project, the cylinder-piston group of the Tumansky M-88 was adopted, although the cylinder ribbing area was increased.

The layout of the engine was completed by 15 August 1939 and the engineering drawing by 15 October. The first prototype began bench tests on 29 November 1939. A total of five prototypes were built in 1939 and another five in 1940. They could not reach the engine's specified power output and suffered from broken crankshafts, pinion shafts and crankcase covers. Production had been planned to begin in 1941, but this was postponed while further development work continued. More prototypes were built between 1941 and 1943 and the engine began its state acceptance tests in December 1943. It failed the tests and was cancelled in early 1944.

== Specifications ==
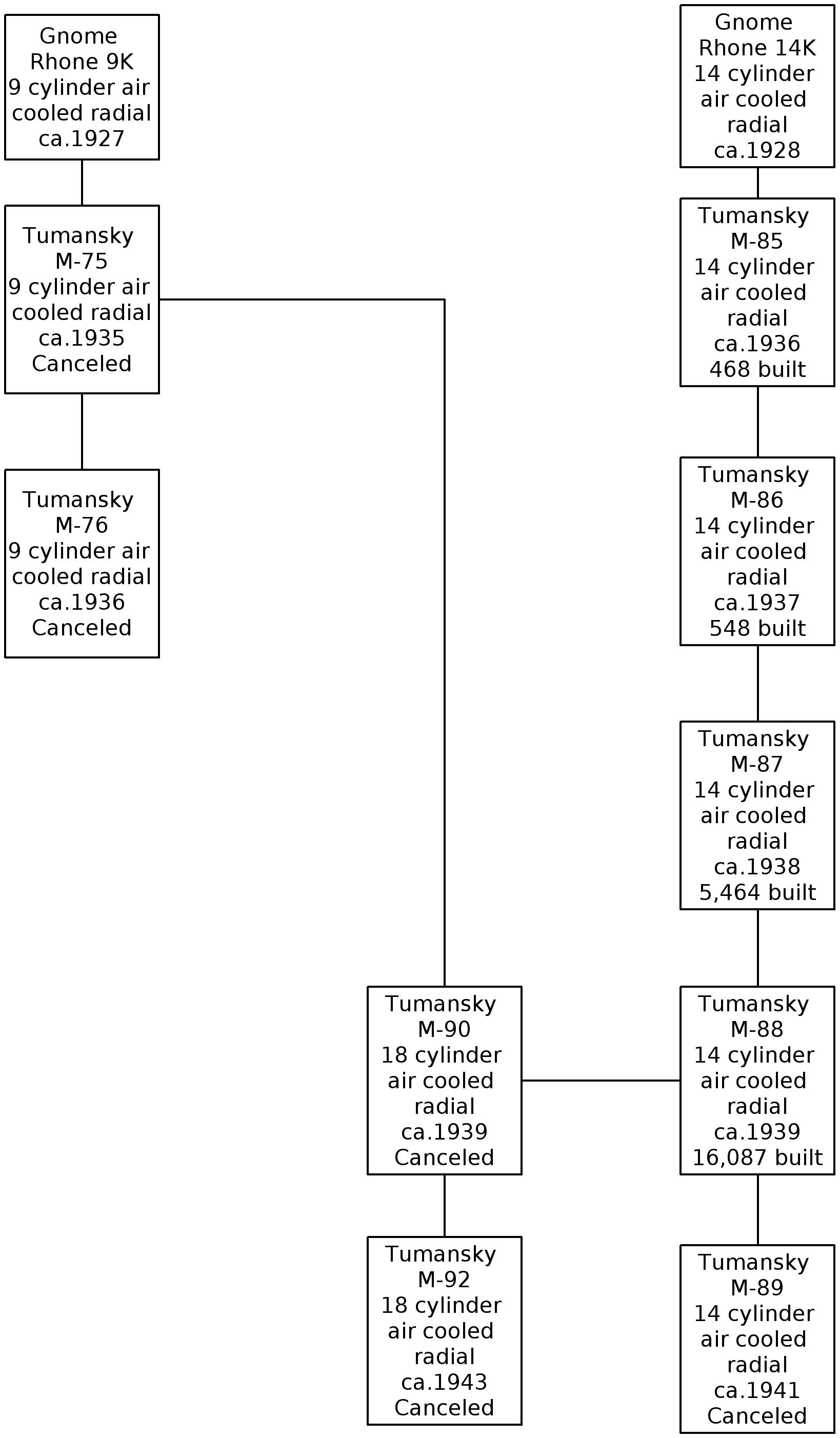
Family tree of Tumansky piston engines

Data from Kotelnikov, Russian Aero Piston Engines

=== General characteristics ===
- Type: 18-cylinder, two-row, radial engine
- Bore: 146 mm (5.7 in)
- Stroke: 165 mm (6.5 in)
- Displacement: 49.7 L (3,030 cu in)

=== Components ===
- Supercharger: two-speed, geared

=== Performance ===
- Power output: 1,750 hp (1,300 kW)

== See also ==
Comparable engines

- Alfa Romeo 135
- BMW 802
- Fiat A.82
- Gnome-Rhône 18L
- Nakajima Homare

Related lists

- List of aircraft engines
