= CANT Z.1007 Alcione =

Italian medium bomber

Cant Z.1007 Alcione
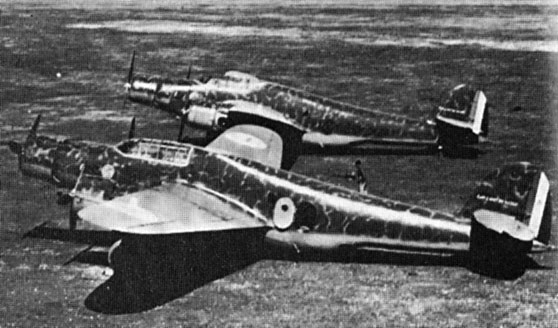

General information
- Type: Medium bomber
- Manufacturer: CANT
- Designer: Filippo Zappata
- Status: Retired
- Primary users: Regia Aeronautica Italian Co-Belligerent Air Force; Aeronautica Nazionale Repubblicana; Luftwaffe
- Number built: 660

History
- Manufactured: 1938–1943
- Introduction date: May 1939
- First flight: March 1937

The CANT Z.1007 Alcione (Kingfisher) was a three-engined medium bomber designed and produced by the Italian aircraft manufacturer CANT. It was regarded by some as "the best Italian bomber of World War II", although its wooden structure was easily damaged by the climate in North Africa and in Russia.

Designed by Filippo Zappata, who also designed the CANT Z.506 Airone, the Z.1007 had a wooden structure and "excellent flying characteristics and good stability". The prototype performed its maiden flight during March 1937, and the type entered service with the Regia Aeronautica in the following year. The initial production version, powered by Isotta-Fraschini Asso XI.RC inline engines, was not fully satisfactory, and thus was largely confined to use as a trainer while design work continued. An improved model, the Z.1007bis, was developed to resolve the problems with the original aircraft; it was powered by Piaggio P.XI RC.40 radial engines and other design refinements.

Production of the type was relatively slow, even following Italy's entry into the Second World War on 10 June 1940. In October of that year, the combat debut of Z.1007 took place during the Italian invasion of Greece. It was subsequently used for reconnaissance and bombing missions in many theatres of the conflict, including the Mediterranean, North Africa and the Eastern Front. It was operated in quantity by the Italian Co-Belligerent Air Force (Aeronautica Nazionale Repubblicana) limited numbers were also flown by the Royal Air Force and Luftwaffe during the conflict. Due to its vulnerability to damage and fire, the Z.1007 was largely flown at night during the latter part of its service life.

== Design and development ==
=== Background ===
During 1935, Filippo Zappata, the chief designer of the Cantieri Aeronautici e Navali Triestini (CANT), designed two medium bombers, the twin-engined CANT Z.1011 and the three-engined CANT Z.1007. Both aircraft were to be powered by 619 kW (830 hp) Isotta-Fraschini Asso XI.RC inline engines and were of wooden construction. The Z.1007 was preferred by both Zappata and the Italian Aviation Ministry, which led to an order for 18 aircraft being placed on 9 January 1936. A further order for 16 aircraft followed on 23 February 1937.

The Z.1007 was developed from the CANT Z.506 Airone seaplane, an aircraft that had established numerous world records in the late 1930s. Unlike the Z.506, it was a land-based version and incorporated many improvements, especially of the engines. The first prototype flew in March 1937; during flight testing, it proved to be superior to the Z.1011, being praised for its handling and manoeuvrability alike. Its performance was lower than predicted and Zappata undertook a redesign of the Z.1007 while production of the initial version was limited to the orders placed before the prototype flew.

The Z.1007 was a mid-winged monoplane with a retractable tailwheel undercarriage. It was typically operated by a crew of five, consisting of two pilots, a flight engineer, a radio operator and a bombardier–navigator. The Z.1007 was fitted with a defensive armament of a 12.7 mm (0.50 in) Breda-SAFAT machine gun in an open dorsal position and a 7.7 mm (0.30 in) machine gun in a ventral tunnel. It could carry up to 800 kg (1,800 lb) of bombs. After much experimentation with the prototype, the production aircraft were furnished with annular radiators so their profile was similar to radial engines that would be fitted to the improved later versions. Delivery of production Asso powered Z.1007s started in February 1939, with production ending in October of that year.

=== Z.1007bis ===
Zappata had continued the development of a considerably changed version, the Z.1007bis, to resolve the problems with the original aircraft. While the new version was of similar layout, it was a new design. Three Piaggio P.XI RC.40 radial engines (a derivative of the French Gnome-Rhône 14K) of 736 kW (987 hp) take-off power replaced the less powerful and unreliable liquid cooled engines of the original version. The bis was longer with wings of greater span and area, while the aircraft was considerably heavier, weighing 580 kg (1,280 lb) more unladen, with a maximum take-off weight 888 kg (1,958 lb) greater. It carried heavier offensive and defensive armament. During July 1939, the prototype bis made its first flight; flight testing proved to be successful. The Z.1007bis was promptly ordered into mass production, permitting deliveries of pre-production aircraft to commence later that same year.

=== Configuration and problems ===
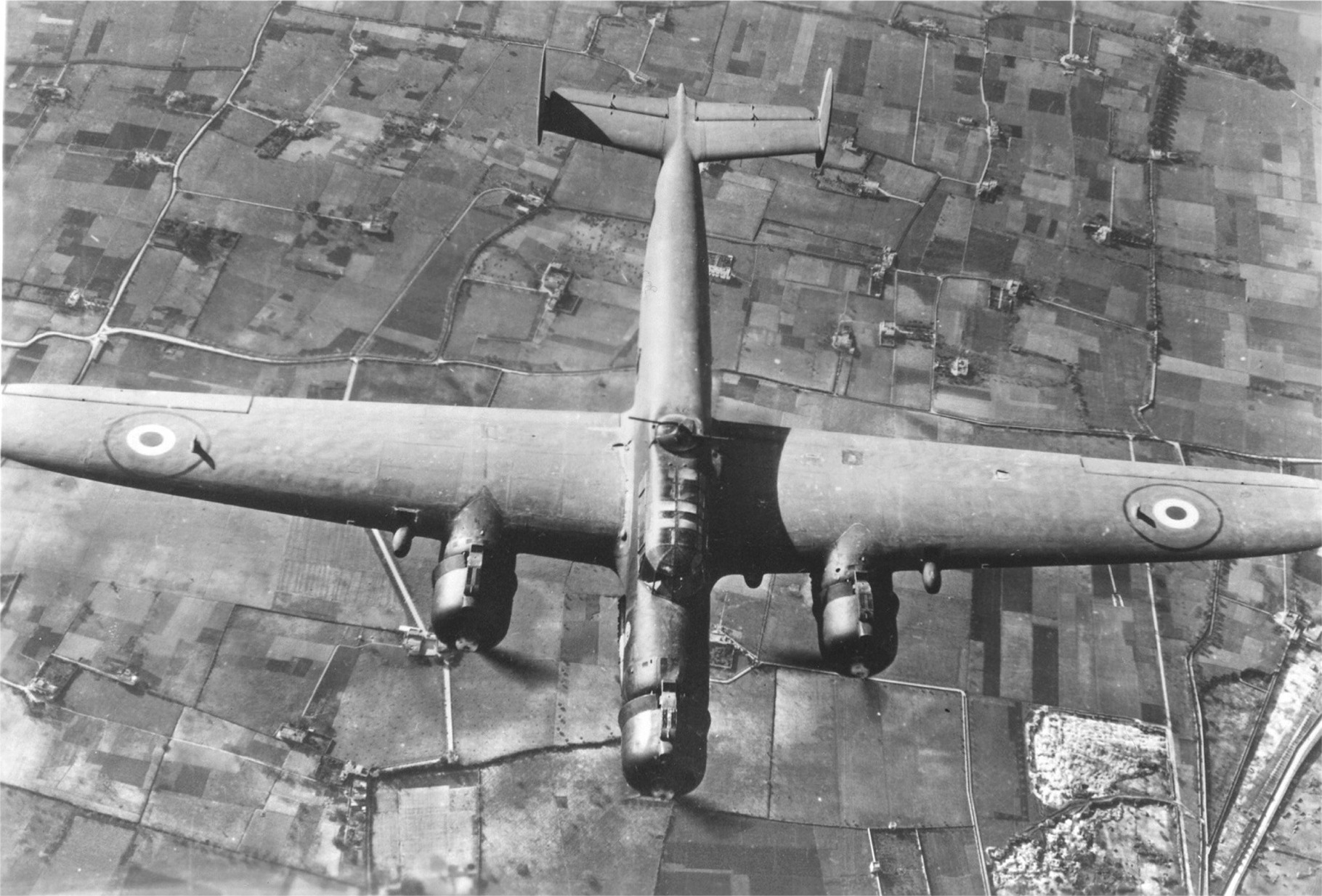
Overhead view

External image
- Cockpit picture showing instruments and bombardier's access way

The Z.1007 had a standard monoplane configuration, with a mid-set wing, single tail, retractable undercarriage and a crew of five or six. It had a wooden structure and a clean shape that was much more aerodynamic than the competing SM.79. The Z.1007 had three engines, with one engine in the nose and two in the wings. The tri-motor design was a common feature of Italian aircraft of the Second World War. The aircraft had a slim fuselage as the two pilots sat in tandem rather than side-by-side as in most bombers of the period. Visibility was relatively good and the aircraft was almost a three-engine fighter. This slimness reduced drag but also somewhat worsened the task of the two pilots. Both pilots' seats were offset to port to allow a passageway for the bombardier to enter his compartment below the pilot's feet (directly behind the central engine), by ducking through an opening under the starboard instrument panel. The front and rear instrument panels contained flight and navigation instruments, while the engine monitoring gauges were located to starboard where the rear pilot could see them past the front pilot's shoulder. Although the rear pilot's view was limited, he was capable of landing or taking off if needed. His primary purpose was to allow the forward pilot to rest, and to add some "muscle" to the controls when needed, as well as acting as an extra set of eyes to notice problems and to monitor gauges while the other was occupied.

There were five crew members: the pilot, the co-pilot, a bombardier–navigator–ventral gunner, a dorsal gunner–radio operator, and waist gunner–flight engineer. The radio equipment was located in the center section between the dorsal turret and the waist position. Like most tri-motor Italian aircraft of the period the Z.1007 lacked adequate defensive armament, although it was no worse than many contemporary designs, many of which had no rotating dorsal turret, no waist guns, or no ventral gun, or combinations. Other problems were poor engine reliability and a poor power-to-weight ratio due to low powered engines (the three 1,000 hp (750 kW) engines of the Z.1007bis were equivalent to twin engines of 1,500 hp (1,100 kW) each, but this was slightly offset by the added weight of the third engine). The Z.1007 also suffered longitudinal stability problems that were partly rectified later by the adoption of a twin tail arrangement. The Z.1007's wooden structure suffered cracks, separations and surface delamination due to the inhospitable climatic conditions in North Africa and Russia, but allowed the aircraft to float in case of ditching. The surface delamination and deformation greatly added to the aircraft's drag. A total of 660 Alciones were built.

=== Armament ===
The Z.1007 had a defensive armament of two 12.7 mm (0.50 in) and two 7.7 mm (0.30 in) machine-guns. The main defensive weapon was a Caproni-Lanciani Delta manually-powered Isotta Fraschini dorsal turret armed with a 12.7 mm (0.50 in) Scotti or Breda-SAFAT machine gun. The turret had a good field of fire, although it had blind spot behind the tail (as did all turreted aircraft without rear gunners or twin fins). The 12.7 mm (0.50 in) Breda was a standard weapon for Italian bombers and the field of fire was improved by the twin-tail configuration on later models. An electrically powered Breda V turret carrying a similar armament was substituted in late production aircraft. Another 12.7 mm (0.50 in) was in the ventral position behind the bomb bay, with a field of fire restricted to the lower rear quadrant of the aircraft. There were also two waist position 7.7 mm (0.30 in) Breda machine guns, with 500 rpg. Only one of the waist guns could be used at a time since the gunner for this position manned both guns (a practice common with other aircraft, such as the Heinkel He 111, B-25 Mitchell and G4M Betty). Simultaneous attacks from both sides were rare, and waist guns are generally the least effective armament on an aircraft, mostly intended to improve morale and provide a deterrent effect. Allied reports stated that armour was better than usual for an Italian bomber, with the dorsal gunner receiving a large .76 m × 1.1 m (2 ft 6 in × 3 ft 7 in) armor plate, plus a small head protection plate of .36 m × .20 m (1 ft 2.2 in × 7.9 in), as well as an 8 mm (0.31 in) thick curved plate which rotated with his turret. There was rear armor plate 5 mm (0.20 in) thick for side gunners, with other 6 mm (0.24 in) all around the machine guns, and 6 mm (0.24 in) armor for ventral machine gun position, which meant that all defensive positions were reasonably protected against light enemy fire and fragments. The pilots were protected with 5 mm (0.20 in) roof and lateral armor, 6 mm (0.24 in) around the seats, 5 mm (0.20 in) overhead, and a 6 mm (0.24 in) armored bulkhead behind them.

The Z.1007 had a lengthy and shallow horizontal bomb bay which could carry 1,200 kg (2,650 lb) of ordnance. Many other Italian aircraft had bomb bays which carried the ordnance vertically, tip pointing up, which limited the size and variety of bombs which could be carried internally, a problem shared with the German He 111 bomber. There were also a pair of under-wing hardpoints which could carry up to 1,000 kg (2,200 lb) of bombs, giving the Z.1007 a potential 2,200 kg (4,900 lb) payload and a maximum range of 640 km (400 mi), but the standard payload was 1,200 kg (2,645 lb) and 1,000 km (621 mi) range. The Z.1007's external hardpoints were a rarity in the bombers of the Regia Aereonautica. The Z.1007 could also carry two 454 mm (17.7 in), 800 kg (1,760 lb) torpedoes slung externally under the belly in an anti-shipping role, an option never used operationally. The bombardier's position was just below and ahead of the pilot, behind the central engine (he could look up at the rudder pedals and see the pilot's face). This improved the layout compared to the SM.79, which located the bombardier in the ventral casemate under the rear fuselage, which meant that it was difficult to man the ventral gun while the bombardier was in position, since space was limited. The forward location of the bombardier's compartment provided somewhat better forward visibility, but was still cramped as well as being relatively loud and subject to considerable vibration, largely due to it being directly behind and very close to the central engine.

== Operational history ==
=== Introduction ===
The first Asso-powered Z.1007s were used to equip the 50° Gruppo of the 16° Stormo from May 1939. These Asso-powered aircraft, despite being designated as bombers, were not considered suitable for operational use as a result of their engines being relatively unreliable as well as the aircraft's high maintenance requirements and their defensive armament being considered to be inadequate. Accordingly, they were typically used as trainer aircraft instead.

The 47° Stormo was equipped with some of the first production aircraft at Ghedi. Production of the type was relatively slow, only fifteen aircraft were being completed every month at most. Gradually, Z.1007s were delivered to a number of different Stormi, such as the 9°, where it substituted the SM.79 and BR.20. Upon Italy's entry into the Second World War on 10 June 1940, Regia Aeronautica had two Stormi equipped with the "Alcione". One was the 16°, with 31 aircraft, equipped with the Isotta Fraschini engine and so declared non bellici ('not suitable for war'). The 47° Stormo had just received four CANT Z.1007bis.

=== Second World War ===
The Z.1007 Asso replaced the Savoia-Marchetti SM.81s of 16° Stormo while 47° Stormo was equipped with Z.1007Bis, but operational readiness was only attained in August, when around thirty machines were sent to Sicily to attack Malta. Stormi 16°, 12°, 35°, and 47° operated over Greece with some losses. 175a Squadriglia da ricognizione (reconnaissance squadron), and later 176a, were deployed to Africa. The British destroyer HMS Juno was sunk by an explosion caused by a Z.1007 bombing during 1941. 35° Stormo was dispatched to Africa in the bombing role; these three-engine aeroplanes were used occasionally in Russia too. During 1942, Z.1007s were used by four groups and two wings in the Mediterranean theatre, in anti-ship role and against Malta, often escorted by Italian and German fighters. By November 1942, there were 10 Gruppi equipped with 75 Z.1007s, with just 39 serviceable aircraft.

During 1942, it was proposed to modify the remaining 16 Z.1007s for weather reconnaissance, re-engining them with Isotta Fraschini Delta engines, but only one aircraft was converted. The Z.1007 participated in the bombing campaign over Malta and in the campaigns in North Africa and on the Eastern Front. Although fast, these bombers were vulnerable when hit and prone to catch fire.

As part of Italian and German efforts to stop the British Operation Pedestal convoy to re-supply Malta in August 1942, a few Z.1007 Alciones of 51° Gruppo Autonomo based in Alghero, Sardinia, flew reconnaissance missions on the convoy between bombing and raids. Only on 14 August, at the end of that "Mid-August Battle", did three Z.1007bis bomb the convoy from high altitude. Another Z.1007bis took part in the battle, carrying out a first in the war special mission, later copied by Allied air forces. The plan of Generale Ferdinando Raffaelli to use a CANT Z.1007 to radio-guide a "SIAI Marchetti SM.79 ARP (Aereo Radio Pilotato, "Aircraft Radio Guided") bomber. The SM.79, without crew and armament, but packed with explosives and equipped with a radio control device, was to be used as a "Flying Bomb" against big naval targets. As the Pedestal Convoy was off the Algerian coast on 12 August 1942, the SM.79 "Drone", the Z.1007bis guide aircraft and escort of five FIAT G.50 fighters flew out to intercept the ships. Once the SM.79's pilot had set his aircraft on a course toward the Allied ships, he bailed out leaving the Z.1007bis crew to guide the flying bomb the rest of the way by radio. The radio, however, malfunctioned. With nothing to guide it, the SM.79-Drone cruised along until it ran out of fuel and crashed on the Algerian mainland.

The few Z.1007ter still flying after the Allied invasion of Sicily went on to fight with the Italian Social Republic, Italian Co-Belligerent Air Force and the Luftwaffe.

=== Malta ===
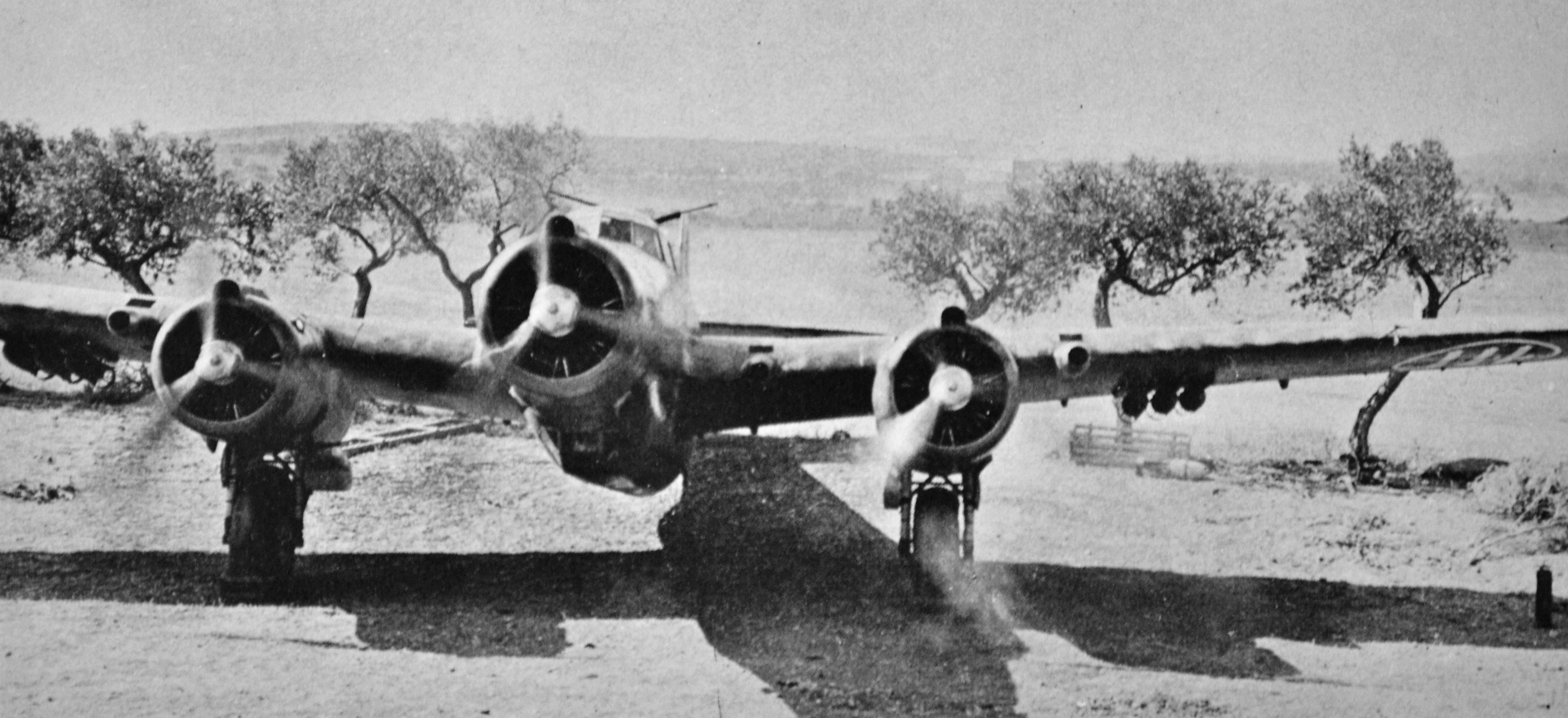
A CANT Z.1007 bis bomber of the Italian Regia Aeronautica getting ready for a bombing mission over Malta; the photograph was taken in Sicily in 1941.

The "Alcione" received its baptism of fire on 29 August 1940, when a formation of 10 CANT Z.1007bis monoderiva of 106° Gruppo bombed Luqa airfield. The 106°, based at Trapani-Chinisia in Sicily, was soon joined by the whole 47° Stormo Bombardamento Terrestre with 33 aircraft. When the war with Greece broke out, the 47° was moved onto that front. The CANT Z.1007s came back on Malta in 1941, with 9° Stormo Bombardamento terrestre, still based at Trapani-Chinisia, with 29° and 33° Gruppo, equipped with 25 "Alcione". The 9° was later joined by 50° Gruppo, based on Sciacca. The Italian units were joined by the German II Fliegerkorps, but when the German aircraft were moved to North Africa, the CANT bombing missions on Malta were reduced. The Italian bombers had to face the strengthened defences of the island, which employed radar combined with Bristol Beaufighter night fighters. The "Alcione" started a third wave of night attacks on Malta between 10 and 20 October 1942. The 9° Stormo and the 8° Gruppo of 43° Stormo had on line 30 CANT Z.1007s but only 12 were operational.

=== Battle of Britain ===
The Z.1007 saw action during the later stages of the Battle of Britain from November 1940 to January 1941. The Regia Aereonautica sent six Z.1007Bis of the 172a Squadriglia to Belgium in the strategic reconnaissance role for the Corpo Aereo Italiano. They were used in force only once, on 11 November 1940, when five were used as a decoy (without bombs or guns) to draw RAF fighters away from the main Italian attack on a convoy and the port facilities around Harwich by 10 Fiat BR 20 bombers. No Z.1007s were lost over Britain, although one of the six originally sent was lost in September on the ferry flight to its base in Belgium.

=== Greco-Italian War ===
The first large-scale use of the CANT Z.1007s took place with the outbreak of the Italian invasion of Greece. During the invasion of Greece, the Regia Aeronautica deployed the largest number of CANT Z.1007s. On 28 October 1940, first day of invasion, 47° Stormo Bombardamento Terrestre (based on Grottaglie airfield) and 50° Gruppo of 50° Stormo (based on Brindisi airfield) had on line 44 Alcione. On 5 November, those units were joined by 41° Gruppo of 12° Stormo, with 16 aircraft. The Stormi suffered few losses, among them two made by a PZL P.24, manned by Second Lieutenant Marinos Mitralexis, who managed to bring down one of the two CANT Z.1007s by ramming its tail. During January 1941, 41° Gruppo was replaced by 95° Gruppo of 35° Stormo. It was in this war theatre that the wooden structure of the CANT Z.1007s began to show its weaknesses. The heavy rains damaged it, forcing continuous repairs by the ground crews.

=== Yugoslavia ===
The CANT Z.1007s opened hostilities against Yugoslavia, on 6 April 1941, bombing Mostar airfield. During that short invasion, Regia Aeronautica deployed 49 CANT Z.1007 bis, 26 of 47° Stormo, 15 of 95° Gruppo (of 35° Stormo) and eight of 50° Gruppo (of 16° Stormo).

=== After the Armistice ===
At the enactment of the Armistice of Cassibile on 3 September 1943, 72 of the 147 bombers still in the hands of Regia Aeronautica were Z.1007s. The largest groups were in Perugia (22 aircraft) and in the Aegean Sea (19 aircraft). Three days after the armistice, on 11 September, the Z.1007s that were in Perugia, joined by eight more, took off for the base of Alghero in Sardinia, losing two of their number to German flak. On 16 September, these bombers attacked German vessels that were carrying troops and equipment from Sardinia to Corsica, and one more aircraft was lost to flak.

On 15 October, the Z.1007s, then based in Sardinia, were grouped with those in Southern Italy to form the Raggruppamento Bombardamento Trasporti (Unit for bombing and transport), under the badge of the Aeronautica Cobelligerante Italiana (ACI or Air Force of the South, Aeronautica del Sud), Italian Co-Belligerent Air Force in English. The worst day for the co-belligerent Z.1007s was 14 May 1944, when Gruppo 88 sent twelve Z.1007s to Tito's forces to deliver supplies. The aircraft dropped 96 food containers on Kolasin, Montenegro, but on the way back nine bombers lost contact with the escort of Macchi C.205s and Reggiane Re. 2001s and were attacked over the Adriatic sea by 7/JG 27 Messerschmitt Bf 109s. Five Alcioni were shot down into the sea by the German pilots (who mistakenly claimed Savoia-Marchetti SM.84) and two more landed heavily damaged at the Lecce-Galatina air base in Apulia. 26 Italian aviators were killed, and more injured. From that day on, the remaining Z.1007s were used for military purposes only under cover of darkness.

== Variants ==
A total of 560 CANT Z.1007s were built, 450 of them of version 1007bis that appeared in late 1939.

Z.1007bis
Z.1007ter
an improved version, that would have used Alfa Romeo 135 engines of 1,040 kW (1,400 hp). This version was dropped because of the advent of the Z.1018 and the unreliability of the engines. There was another -ter proposal with P.XIX engines (858 kW/1,150 hp), and production was started in 1942, with a total of around 150 made. Test pilots were more impressed by this machine than the Z.1018, faster but with less power (because of the layout with only two P.XII engines), while the range was improved from 2,000 km (1,240 mi) to 2,250 km (1,400 mi) with 2,460 kg (5,420 lb) fuel and 900 kg (1,980 lb) bombs. So, while the Z.1018 had 2,013 kW (2,700 hp), already Z.1007Bis had 2,237 kW/3,000 hp (1,946 kW/2,610 hp at take off) and Z.1007ter 2,572 kW (3,450 hp).

Performances were improved with a max speed of 490 km/h (300 mph) at 6,150 m (20,180 ft) instead of 456 at 4,600 m (15,100 ft). Climbing to 3,000 m (9,800 ft) in 6 minutes and 28 seconds, and 5,000 m (16,400 ft) in 10 minutes and 44 seconds (Z.1007 bis in 12 minutes and 42 seconds, Z.1007 Asso in 14 minutes and 34 seconds). Armament and armour were also improved. The dorsal turret was a Breda model, waist guns were replaced by 12.7 mm (.5 in) weapons. The ceiling was raised to 9,000 m (29,500 ft) from 8,400 m (27,600 ft).

Z.1007s were used mainly as night bombers and reconnaissance; they were also used for long range reconnaissance, with excellent results. Some, at least twenty, were equipped with an auxiliary tank that gave 1,000 km (620 mi) extra endurance. Some were adapted for flare drops when day missions were too dangerous. One modification for photo missions had six robot machines in a ventral gondola plus another in the fuselage. The long range and the ceiling helped these aircraft to obtain good results until the Spitfires appeared in the Mediterranean theatre. They were also the first victims of P-40 Tomahawks over Alexandria.

Z.1015
proposed as a record-breaking version of the Z.1007 in 1938, but not considered until 1942, when the Alfa 135s were substituted by Piaggio P.XII engines. It could reach a speed of 563 km/h (350 mph; 304 kn), thanks to a total of over 2,982 kW (4,000 hp) installed. It was tested successfully as a torpedo aircraft, but it was not used operationally and did not enter production.

== Operators ==
Independent State of Croatia

- Zrakoplovstvo Nezavisne Države Hrvatske

Germany

- Luftwaffe operated captured aircraft

Kingdom of Italy

- Regia Aeronautica
- Italian Co-Belligerent Air Force
- Aeronautica Nazionale Repubblicana

Free French

- Free French Air Force operated captured aircraft

== Specifications (Z.1007bis) ==
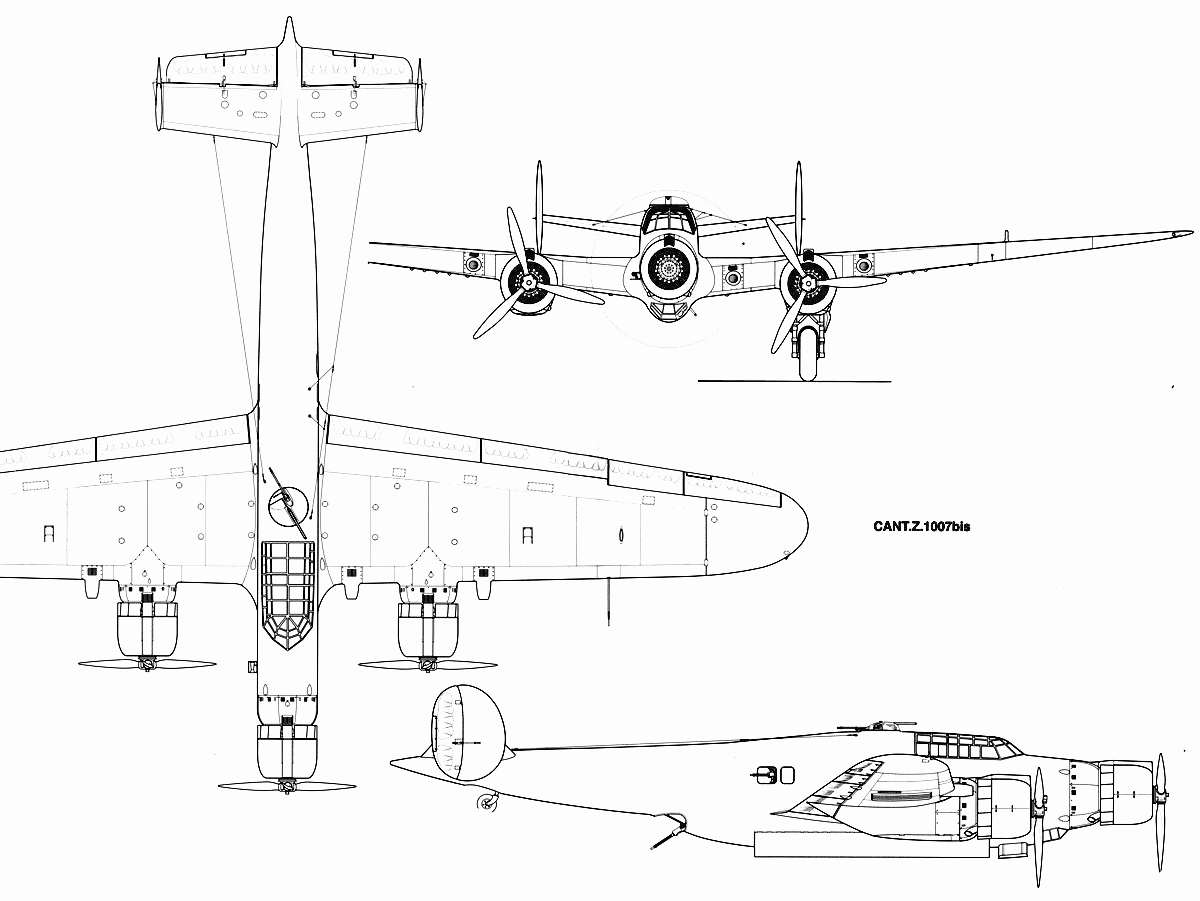
3-view drawing of CANT Z.1007

Data from The Encyclopedia of Weapons of World War II

General characteristics

- Crew: 5
- Length: 18.35 m (60 ft 2 in)
- Wingspan: 24.8 m (81 ft 4 in)
- Height: 5.22 m (17 ft 2 in)
- Wing area: 70 m^{2} (750 sq ft)
- Empty weight: 9,396 kg (20,715 lb)
- Max takeoff weight: 13,621 kg (30,029 lb)
- Powerplant: 3 × Piaggio P.XI R.C.40 14-cylinder air-cooled radial piston engine, 745 kW (999 hp) each
- Propellers: 3-bladed variable-pitch propellers

Performance

- Maximum speed: 458 km/h (285 mph, 247 kn)
- Cruise speed: 338 km/h (210 mph, 183 kn)
- Range: 1,795 km (1,115 mi, 969 nmi)
- Service ceiling: 7,500 m (24,600 ft)

Armament

- Guns: ** 2 × 12.7 mm (0.5 in) Isotta-Fraschini Scotti or Breda-SAFAT machine guns
  - 2 × 7.7 mm (0.303 in) Breda-SAFAT machine guns
- Bombs: ** 1,200 kg (2,645 lb) of bombs internally. 1,000 kg (2,200 lb) externally on underwing hardpoints. Or a combined load of 2,200 kg (4,900 lb) of bombs internally and on external hardpoints.
  - 2 × 450 mm (17.7 in) 800 kg (1,800 lb), torpedoes

== See also ==
Aircraft of comparable role, configuration, and era

- Armstrong Whitworth Albemarle
- Heinkel He 111
- Ilyushin Il-4
- Nakajima Ki-49
- Martin B-26 Marauder
- Mitsubishi G4M
- Savoia-Marchetti SM.79 Sparviero
- Savoia-Marchetti SM.81 Pipistrello

Related lists

- List of interwar military aircraft
- List of bomber aircraft
- List of aircraft of World War II
- List of Regia Aeronautica aircraft used in World War II
