= Fiat A.82 =

1930s Italian piston aircraft engine

A.82
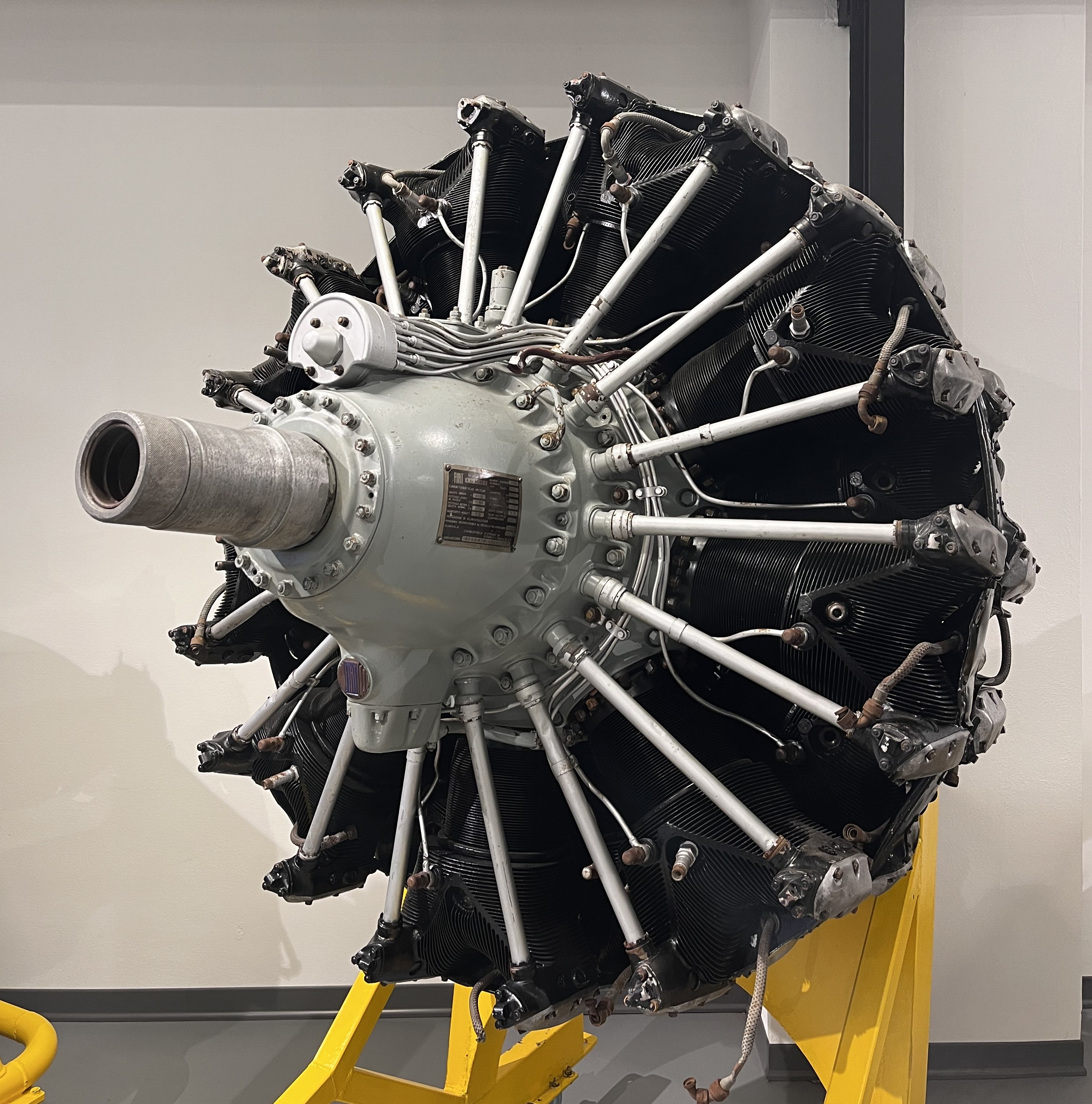
- Fiat A.82 on display at the Italian Air Force Museum
- Type: Air cooled 18 cylinder radial aircraft engine
- National origin: Italy
- Manufacturer: Fiat
- First run: 1938
- Major applications: Fiat BR.20bis
- Developed from: Fiat A.80

The Fiat A.82 was an air cooled radial engine with 18 cylinders developed by the Italian engineering company Fiat and produced in small numbers during World War II. It was one of the most powerful aircraft engines produced in Italy and the culmination of series of successively larger engines developed from the A.74. It was used as the power plant for one operational aircraft, the Fiat BR.20bis bomber.

== Design and development ==
First run in 1938, the A.82 was a more powerful development of the A.80, itself derived from the A.74, which powered the Breda Ba.65 and Fiat BR.20. It was claimed to be 50% more powerful than its antecedents and one of the most powerful engines produced by the country. It was the largest Italian engine design of the time.

The A.82 was an 18-cylinder radial, consisting of two rows of nine cylinders arranged in a double star with a triple throw crankcase made of aluminium alloy. Each cylinder had the same bore as the A.40 at 140 mm (5.5 in) but an increased stroke of 170 mm (6.7 in). They had steel barrels and aluminium alloy heads. Fuel was mixed in a Zenith-Stromberg downdraught carburettor.

The engine was produced in two versions, the RC.40 of 1,250 hp (932 kW) and the RC.42 of 1,400 hp (1,044 kW), and saw limited operational service. In addition to the fifteen Fiat BR.20bis operated by the Regia Aeronautica, Fiat also used the engine to power design studies like their BR.26 torpedo bomber.

== Variants ==
A.82 R.C.40
With reduction gear and supercharger, rated altitude 4,000 m (13,000 ft).
A.82 R.C.42
With reduction gear and supercharger, rated altitude 4,200 m (13,800 ft).

== Applications ==
- Fiat BR.20bis (R.C.42)

== Specifications (R.C.42) ==
Data from Wilkinson, 1945.

=== General characteristics ===
- Type: 18-cylinder, two row, air cooled radial engine
- Bore: 140 mm (5.5 in)
- Stroke: 170 mm (6.7 in)
- Displacement: 47.1 L (2,874 in^{3})
- Length: 1,500 mm (59 in)
- Diameter: 1,350 mm (53 in)
- Height: 1,000 mm (39 in)
- Dry weight: 870 kg (1,920 lb)
- Garelli compressed air starter

=== Components ===
- Valvetrain: Two valves per cylinder driven by pushrods
- Supercharger: Single stage, mechanical, 8.65:1
- Fuel type: Gasoline
- Cooling system: Air-cooled

=== Performance ===
- Power output:
  - Take-off: 1,400 hp (1,044 kW) at 2,400 rpm
  - Normal: 1,250 hp (932 kW) at 2,300 rpm at 4,200 m (13,800 ft)
  - Cruise: 950 hp (708 kW) at 1,900 rpm at 4,500 m (14,800 ft)
- Compression ratio: 6.5:1
- Fuel consumption: 0.48 lb/hp/hr (220 g/kW/hr)
- Oil consumption: 0.022 lb/hp/hr (10 g/kW/hr)

== See also ==
Comparable engines

- Alfa Romeo 135
- Bristol Hercules
- Nakajima Homare
- Piaggio P.XXII
- Pratt & Whitney R-2800 Double Wasp
- Tumansky M-90

Related lists

- List of aircraft engines
