= Piaggio P.XII =

1930s Italian aircraft piston engine

P.XII
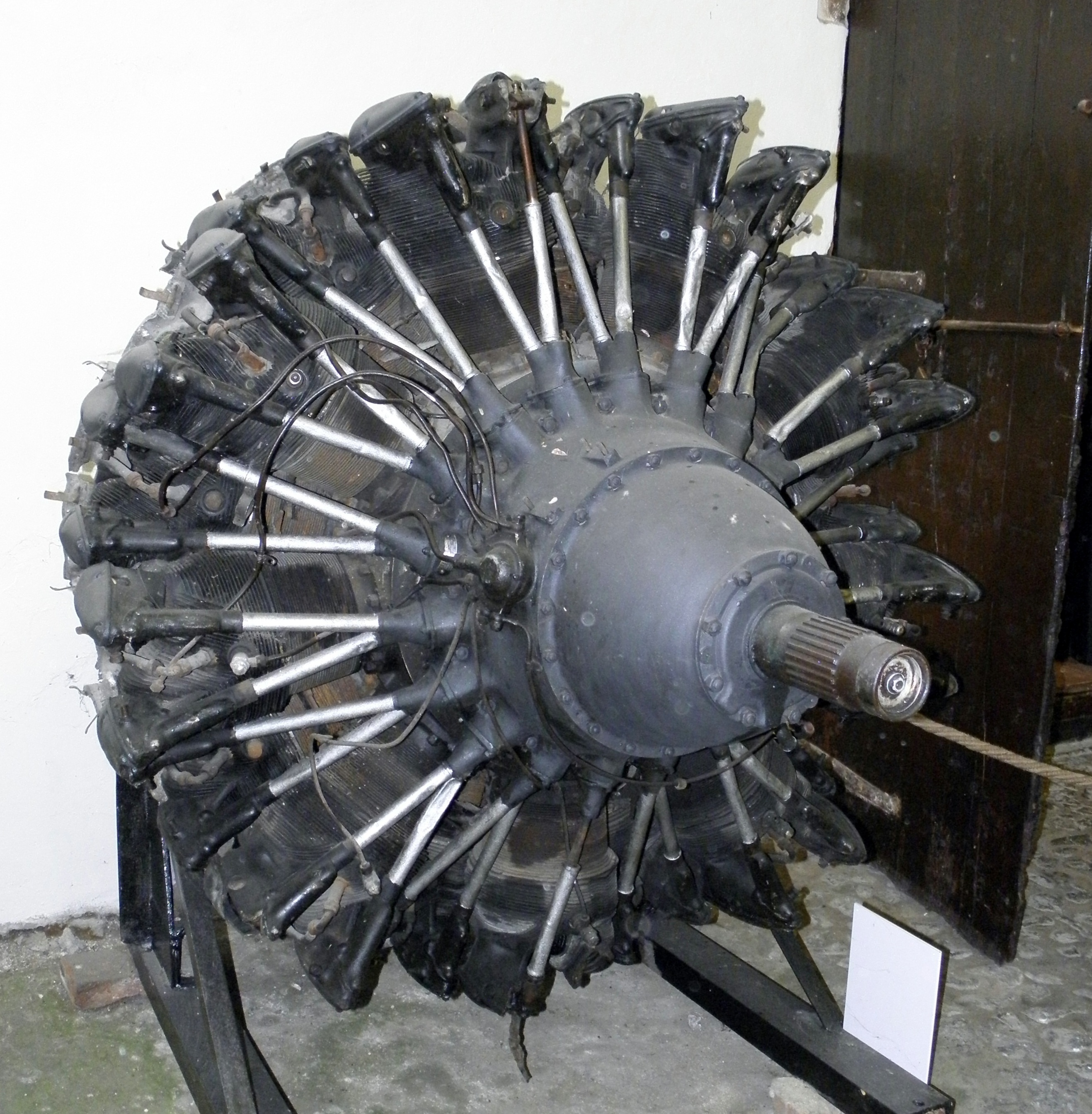
- The Piaggio P.XII displayed at Museo dell'Aria e dello Spazio in San Pelagio, Due Carrare, Province of Padua
- Type: Radial engine
- National origin: Italy
- Manufacturer: Piaggio
- Major applications: Piaggio P.108; CANT Z.1018

The Piaggio P.XII is an Italian 18-cylinder radial aircraft engine developed in the 1930s by Rinaldo Piaggio S.p.A. The P.XII was two Piaggio P.X engines in tandem, which were versions of the French Gnome-Rhône 9K Mistral made under license, themselves being much modified Gnome-Rhône 9A - a license-built Bristol Jupiter.

The engine was used in some Italian aircraft from 1940 until the end of World War II, especially the Piaggio P.108. An up-rated version was tested as the Piaggio P.XXII.

== Variants ==
Variants of the Piaggio P.XII include: (R - Riduttore - reduction gearing and C - Compressore - supercharged)

P.XII R.C.35
(geared, rated altitude 3,500 m (11,500 ft))
P.XII R.C.40
(geared, rated altitude 4,000 m (13,000 ft))
P.XII R.C.100/2v
(geared, rated altitude 10,000 m (33,000 ft))
P.XV R.C.60/2v
(geared, rated altitude 6,000 m (20,000 ft))
P.XXII R.C.35D
Higher rating with slightly higher displacement than the P.XII series engines. (geared, rated altitude 3,500 m (11,500 ft))
P.XXII R.C.35R
Same as P.XXII R.C.35D, but propeller rotates in opposite direction
P.XXII R.C.60
(geared, rated altitude 6,000 m (20,000 ft))

== Applications ==
- CANT Z.1015
- CANT Z.1018
- CANT Z.511
- Caproni Ca.169
- Piaggio P.108
- Savoia-Marchetti SM.84
- Savoia-Marchetti SM.89

== Specifications (P.XII R.C.35) ==
Data from Aircraft Engines of the World 1945.

=== General characteristics ===
- Type: 18-cylinder air-cooled radial engine
- Bore: 146 mm (5.75 in)
- Stroke: 176 mm (6.93 in)
- Displacement: 53 L (3,200 cu in)
- Length: 1,700 mm (66.93 in)
- Diameter: 1,410 mm (55.51 in)
- Dry weight: 850 kg (1,874 lb)
- Frontal Area: 1.56 m^{2} (16.8 sq ft)

=== Components ===
- Valvetrain: 2 x overhead valves per cylinder operated by rockers and pushrods
- Supercharger: Centrifugal compressor, geared to 7.81:1
- Fuel system: Single Piaggio downdraught carburettor with automatic boost and mixture control
- Fuel type: 87 octane
- Oil system: Pressure fed at 482.6 kPa (70 psi), dry sump
- Cooling system: Air
- Reduction gear: Epicyclic reduction gear, gear ratio: 0.62:1
- Starter: Garelli compressed air starter
- Ignition: 2x Marelli AQ18 magnetos, 2 x spark plugs per cylinder fed by a shielded ignition harness.

=== Performance ===
- Power output: Take-off: 1,500 hp (1,100 kW) at 2,100rpm
- Military: 1,350 hp (1,010 kW) at 2,100rpm at 3,500 m (11,500 ft)
- Cruising: 1,000 hp (750 kW) at 1,700rpm at 3,500 m (11,500 ft)
- Specific power: 22.29 kW/L (0.49 hp/cu in)
- Compression ratio: 6.5:1
- Specific fuel consumption: 0.2795 kg/kW/hr (0.46 lb/hp/hr)
- Oil consumption: 0.0134 kg/k/w/hr (0.022 lb/hp/hr)
- Power-to-weight ratio: 1.324 kW/kg (0.8 hp/lb)

== See also ==
- Gnome-Rhône 18L
- Tumansky M-90

Related lists

- List of aircraft engines
