= Piaggio P.108 =

Italian World War II bomber

P.108
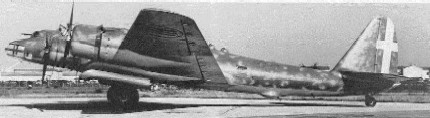
- Piaggio P.108

General information
- Type: Heavy bomber or Attack Aircraft
- Manufacturer: Piaggio
- Primary users: Regia Aeronautica Luftwaffe
- Number built: 36 + 1 prototype (P.108B bombers); 12 + 1 prototype (P.108T transport)

History
- Introduction date: 1942
- First flight: 24 November 1939
- Retired: 1945

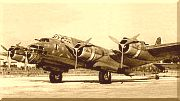
Piaggio P.108 front quarter view

The Piaggio P.108 Bombardiere was an Italian four-engine heavy bomber that saw service with the Regia Aeronautica during World War II. The prototype first flew on 24 November 1939 and it entered service in 1941. It was one of a handful of Italian combat aircraft that could match the best manufactured by the Allies. Four versions of the P.108 were designed, but only one, the P.108B bomber, was produced in any quantity before the armistice. The other variants included the P.108A anti-ship aircraft with a 102 mm (4 in) gun, the P.108C, an airliner with an extended wingspan and re-modelled fuselage capable of carrying 32 passengers, and the P.108T transport version designed specifically for military use. Only one P.108A and 24 P.108Bs were built. The combined total number of all versions (and prototypes) was at least 39, almost certainly more than 44. Most of the P.108Cs were subsequently modified for use as military transport aircraft and could accommodate up to sixty passengers. Nine P.108 Ts were used by Luftwaffe transport units until the end of the war.

== P.108B ==
=== Design and development ===
The P.108 was unique in the history of Italian aviation, as it was the only four-engine strategic bomber used by the Regia Aeronautica during World War II. It was a development of the earlier underpowered and wooden-structured P.50-II which was unable to take off at its designed maximum weight.

The designer of the aircraft was Giovanni Casiraghi, an experienced engineer who had worked in the US from 1927 to 1936. On the basis of his experience he designed a radically new aeroplane. The P.108 was an all-metal low wing bomber with a retractable under-carriage. During the Air Ministry official requirement of 1939, it won the Regia Aeronautica's contract for a new bomber over the CANT Z.1014 as it became obvious that the other competitors could not deliver useful numbers of aircraft to the Italian Royal Air Force before the mid-1940s.

The first prototype P.108B flew on 24 November 1939. It performed extremely well in a series of tests and required refining in only a few minor areas, but it took some time for pilots to get used to the new aircraft. The P.108 was delivered to a single unit, the 274a Squadriglia (274th Squadron), in 1941. But there were several accidents, one of them involving the son of Italian dictator Benito Mussolini. On 7 August 1941, Bruno Mussolini, commander of the 274a Squadriglia, was piloting one of the prototypes of the "secret" bomber. He flew too low and crashed into a house. The cockpit section separated from the rest of the aircraft and although the aircraft did not catch fire, it was nevertheless totally destroyed in the impact. Commander Bruno Mussolini died from his injuries.

By the end of 1941, the P.108B had demonstrated just 391 flying hours. Nonetheless, the new bomber showed much promise. The average Italian bomber cost around 2.1 million lire, the SM.79 cost 1.7 million, while the P.108 cost 5.2 million. This would seem to favor the smaller bomber. But in a comparison to deliver a given weight of bombs at the same distance, the P.108B had the advantage. With a single squadron of nine P.108s capable of flying 1,100 km (680 mi) with 3,500 kg (7,700 lb), the estimated efficiency was comparable to a group of 26 SM.79s covering 1,000 km (620 mi) with 1,000 kg (2,200 lb). The total cost of each 'group' of aircraft required was about the same at 46.8 and 45.6 million lire respectively, but only 54 crew were required to man the P.108s compared to 130 required to man the SM.79s.

The P.108B's engines were designed to be more powerful than those propelling the B-17, and most of its defensive gun turrets were remote-controlled.

The second series, designated P.108B II, were a revised sub-category with the nose turret removed. While this reduced defence against head-on attacks, the aircraft was operated mainly at night. The speed gain was ten km/h (six mph), due to weight reduction and the more aerodynamic nose.

=== Technical details ===
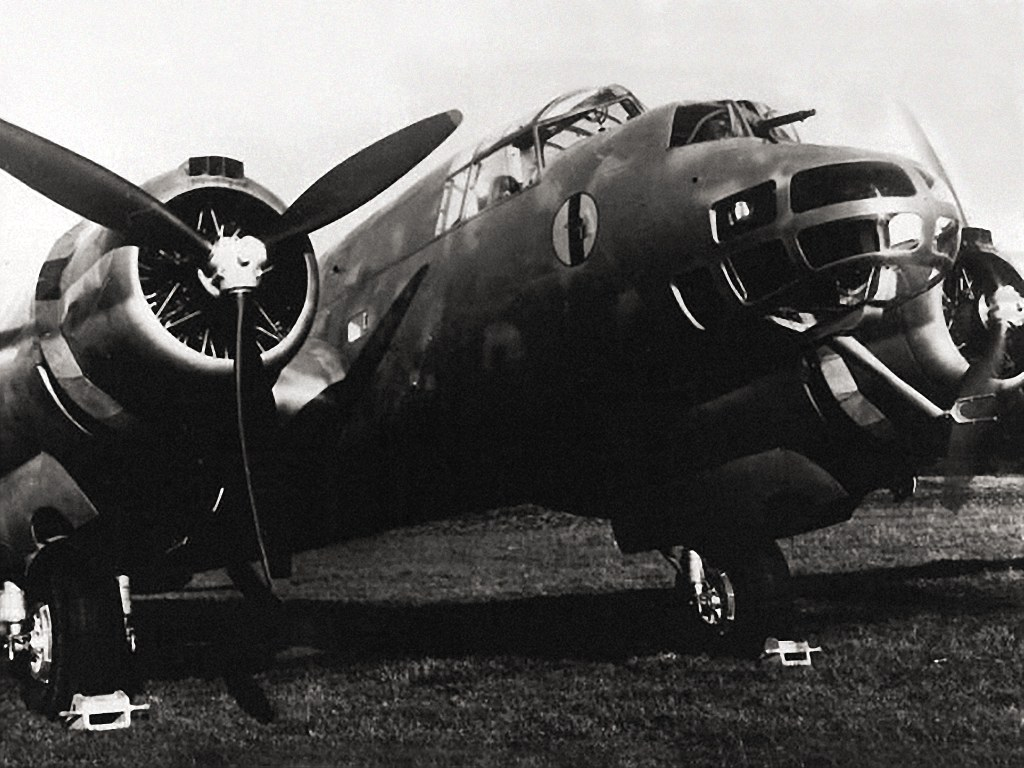
Like the Lancaster, the P.108's nose turret was positioned above the bombardier/bomb-aimer

The P.108 was an all-metal, four-engine bomber, with a crew of eight. It had a very robust modern structure (with a six g tolerance) designed by Giovanni Casiraghi, and built almost entirely of duralumin.

Provisions for the crew included a two-pilot cockpit with five to six crew members located in the mid-fuselage and nose; like the early B-17 Flying Fortresses, the P.108 had no tail turret. The most noticeable feature was the nose, having a separate structure for the bombardier/bomb-aimer, with the front turret above him, similar to the nose of the Armstrong Whitworth Whitley with the lower part protruding from the rest. The P.108's tail was even larger, because of the need to stabilise the heavy, powerful aircraft (30,000 kg; 66,000 lb and up to 4,500 kW; 6,000 hp at take-off, around 20% heavier than early B-17s).

=== Engines and performance ===
Piaggio was one of the few Italian aviation companies that had the capability to develop both aircraft and engines: their P.XII engines, although unreliable, were among the most powerful of their time. Fiat was a much larger company that also designed and manufactured airframes and powerplants, but limited its production to aircraft like the BR.20 Cicogna, a conventional medium bomber.

The P.108 was equipped with four air-cooled 18-cylinder P.XII radial engines, which suffered from reliability problems, but produced 1,010 kW (1,350 hp) at 3,000 metres (9,800 feet), with 1,120 kW (1,500 hp) at takeoff, and drove three-blade constant-speed Piaggio propellers. The P.XII was two Piaggio P.X. engines in tandem, which were versions of the French Gnome-Rhône 9K Mistral made under license, themselves being derived from the license-built Bristol Jupiters. Alfa Romeo also lacked a powerful, modern engine, and its 1,010 kW (1,350 hp) AR.132s were two Bristol Mercurys in tandem.

12 self-sealing fuel tanks could hold around 12,000 L (3,100 US gal), and eight oil tanks, two for each engine, held a total of 350 L (90 US gal). The combination of a heavy airframe and powerful engines resulted in high fuel consumption, and the P.108's performance at high altitude was mediocre, with a practical ceiling of about 6,000 metres (20,000 feet) and a theoretical 8,000 metres (26,000 feet). By comparison, the B-17C was capable of attaining a 3,000 metres (9,800 feet) higher ceiling. The figure for the Italian bomber was comparable to contemporary bombers: the ceiling for the RAF's best bomber, the Avro Lancaster was similar, while the USAAF's B-17, B-24 and later B-29 were unusual in being able to gain such altitudes. This was due to their installed turbochargers, as well as doctrinal differences in high altitude precision bombing advocated by the United States Army Air Forces.

The P.108 could reach speeds of 420 km/h (260 mph) at 4,300 metres (14,100 feet), which was slower than several types of biplane. Whereas the B-17C was capable of 515 km/h (320 mph) at over 7,000 metres (23,000 feet), even if its range and bombload, 3,220 km (2,000 mi) with 1,800 kg (4,000 lb), were slightly inferior to those of the P.108's 3,335 km (2,072 mi) with 2,000 kg (4,400 lb). The aircraft could fly 2,500 km (1,600 mi) with a bombload of 3,500 kg (7,700 lb), and 3,600 km (2,200 mi) with 600 kg (1,300 lb). Though much better than a typical Italian bomber (800–900 km (500–560 mi) carrying 1,000 kg (2,200 lb), this was not impressive compared to the Avro Lancaster, able to fly 3,100 km (1,900 mi) carrying 4,000 kg (8,800 lb), and the B-24, about 3,220 km (2,000 mi) with the same load. The SM.82, normally with around half of the P-108's fuel (around 5,500 L/1,500 US gal), was able to reach long-range targets, such as Gibraltar, when adapted to carry the necessary additional fuel.

=== Bomb load ===
The P.108 had a large bomb bay which was capable of carrying 3,500 kg (7,700 lb) of bombs.

Depending on the target - these were uploaded either as:

- 7 × 250 or 500 kg (550 or 1,100 lb) bombs.
- 34 × 100 kg; 220 lb (true weight: 129 kg; 284 lb).
- 38 × 50 kg; 110 lb (true weight: 69 kg; 152 lb) bombs.

The bomb bay was located centrally in the fuselage, and divided longitudinally into three sections which prevented it from carrying heavier bombs like the 800 kg (1,800 lb) types. This was a considerable limitation, whereas the SM.82 was capable of accommodating larger loads (being able to be used both in transport and the bomber role). In the torpedo-bomber configuration, three torpedoes could be carried under the belly and the wings.

=== Defensive armament ===
The defensive armament of the first P.108 series consisted of eight Breda-SAFAT machine guns. One Breda "O" 12.7 mm (.5 in) with 450 rounds was fitted in the nose, and a Breda "G9" 12.7 mm (.5 in) in a retractable ventral turret, with 400-450 rounds per gun. In addition to these two fully hydraulically powered turrets, there were two 7.7 mm (.303 in) guns in the flanks, with 500 rounds per gun. The wing armament consisted of two remote-controlled, hydraulically powered Breda "Z" turrets with 600 rounds per gun in the outer-engine wing nacelles, linked to one of the two cupolas in the fuselage "hump", with an operator in each. The wing turrets represented the most innovative aspect of the P.108's technology.

Although considered a very advanced design, the operational suitability of the wing nacelle turret installations was questionable:

== P.108A ==
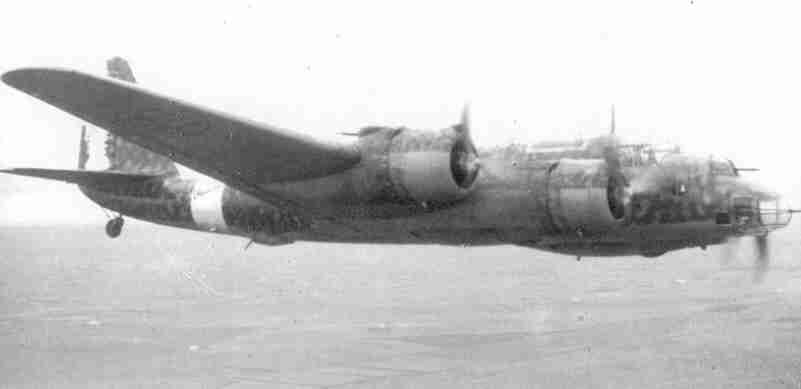
P108 in flight.

In response to a request in November 1942, the P.108A Artigliere "gunship" was developed for anti-shipping duties to supplement torpedo bombers. It was armed with a modified high velocity Cannone da 90/53 gun mounted in a redesigned nose. This was considered the most effective artillery piece in service, and in several versions was used as an anti-aircraft and anti-tank gun by the Army and the Navy. To be more effective in its new role, the size of the gun was increased from 90 mm (3.5 in) to 102 mm (4 in), a non-standard Italian artillery calibre, and fired shells weighing 13 kg (29 lb) as opposed to the standard gun's 10 kg (22 lb), with a muzzle velocity of over 600 m/s (1,970 ft/s).The gun together with its recoil system weighed 1,500 kg (3,300 lb). Due to it being a re-bored smaller gun, its weight was relatively low for its calibre.

The P.108A concept was in line with other contemporary developments, as medium bombers such as the North American B-25 Mitchell and even smaller attack-aircraft like the Henschel Hs 129 were being fitted with high-velocity 75 mm (3 in) guns.

The gun was mounted longitudinally in the fuselage centreline, at a depressed angle, and had a powerful recoil, which the 27 tonne (30 ton) airframe was able to absorb. The amount of ammunition that could be carried was around 50-60 rounds for the main gun, as well as up to three standard torpedoes or two radio-guided torpedoes (a secret weapon which was never used in combat), and for the defensive wing and fuselage turrets. The 102 mm (4 in) gun was intended to be fitted with a ballistic sight with an analogue computer, and a six or 12 round mechanical loader.

Initial modifications were made to MM.24318 which on 16 December 1942 flew to Savona. The modifications were completed in February 1943, and testing commenced on 3 March.

Testing of the P.108A was satisfactory, achieving a maximum speed of around 440 km/h (270 mph) due to aerodynamic redesigning. It flew to Furbara on 19 March, and later to Pisa on 16 April, where it carried out a series of firing trials at altitudes between 1,500 and 4,500 m (4,900 and 14,800 ft) to collect the ballistic data that was required to allow the computing gunsight to be produced. After totalling 24 hr, 40 min of flight and weapons trials, it returned to Albenga. It was presented as the new official attack machine at Furbara on 22 May, and it was planned to build five further P.108As, as well as converting between five or possibly all P.108s available. But on 29 June, it was decided to produce no more than five aircraft, and in July, the order was further limited to two, and eventually cancelled. On 6 and 8 September, the lone P.108A made other weapons tests over the sea, finally equipped with the S. Giorgio calibration/aiming system. German forces took control of the P.108A and painted it in their insignia, but it was damaged soon afterwards by Allied bombing. Repaired by 7 April 1944, it finally flew to Rechlin where it was probably destroyed in one of the many Allied bombing raids.

Although the P.108A proved to be capable, and fired over 280 shells in testing, the Armistice and the never-ending change of priorities halted its development. The use of such large aircraft in a dangerous anti-ship role was however questionable (though the US Army Air Corps used the B-17 Flying Fortress in such a role with great success). At sea level, speeds 360 km/h (220 mph) was the best safely achievable, the cost was even greater than that of standard bombers, and the improved naval anti-aircraft defences (Bofors 40 mm guns, P-F shells, and fire-control radar) led Germany to develop glide bombs like the Henschel Hs 293 and Fritz X.

== P.108C/T ==
While the P.108B's troubled development continued, Piaggio's workload was further stressed by the request for new transport aircraft, capable of long-range flights to South America for Linee Aeree Transcontinentali Italiane (LATI). The intention in 1939 to license-build the Boeing 307 Stratoliner wasn't realised, so in 1940, it was proposed to use the P.108C as an "interim" transport, awaiting the P.126C and even the P.127C six-engined variant. They were planned to have a pressurised cabin to accommodate 32 passengers in a wider fuselage, but no armament. The prototype first flew on 16 July 1942, when there were no longer any transatlantic lines to serve. Despite this, and the inability of Piaggio to deliver P.108B bombers on time, an order for a further five P.108Cs was placed.

On 26 March 1941, the P.108T military cargo version was ordered. This unpressurised variant was fitted with one Caproni dorsal turret, one Breda in the ventral turret, and two flank machine guns, all of 12.7 mm (.5 in) calibre, and was capable of 440 km/h (270 mph). Through a ventral door 4.8 m (15 ft 9 in) long and 1.9 m (6 ft 3 in) wide, it was possible to fit two Macchi C.200s. Internal volume was over 77 m^{3} (2,700 ft^{3}), and could carry up to 60 soldiers, eight torpedoes or 12 tonnes (13 tons) of cargo. After many changes in design, the first P.108T flew on 7 September 1942. Although the 148ma Squadriglia was intended to use both P.108Cs and P.108Ts, only a few were built before the Germans took control of production, subsequently at least 11 other examples were completed.

Four P.108Cs and five P.108Ts were handed over to the Luftwaffe and used on the Eastern Front, notably during the 1944 evacuation of Axis troops following the Crimean Offensive. The P.108C (civil airliner, with 32 seats) and T (military transport) were more reliable than the bomber variants, and their capability of carrying heavy loads (such as two dismantled fighters) was important, as the Luftwaffe did not have many heavy transport aircraft, relying mainly on the smaller Ju 52s. These aircraft also had four 13 mm (.51 in) MG 131 machine guns as defensive armament, with one in a dorsal turret, one in a ventral position, and two waist positions.

One example, known as "Die General", was destroyed on Salonicco airfield. Transportfliegerstaffel 5 operated most of these aircraft and used them until the end of the war, with one assigned to the links between Italy and Germany and the other on the Eastern front. On 10 August 1944, an air raid destroyed six of them. Another four were destroyed or captured in 1945. The P.108T-2, a postwar version, was proposed but without success, and thus ended the P.108 series history.

== P.133 ==
The final development of the P.108, the P.133 prototype, was almost complete by the time of the Armistice (8 September 1943), but the program was dropped soon afterwards and the aircraft was never finished.

It was designed to have a lighter structure and several improvements in performance, which were partially influenced by a captured B-24, with a potential speed of 490 km/h (300 mph), six 20 mm cannons, four 12.7 mm (0.50 in) machine guns and a bomb load of up to 4,800 kg (10,600 lb).

Six P.133 were under construction when the Armistice was signed with one 90% completed. This one was hidden in a Liguria cave, but it was soon dismantled by the Piaggio workers.

In 1943 a commercial version for civilian passengers (named P.133C) was being studied with a range of 5000 km, but a prototype was never made.

== Operational history ==
P.108Bs were deployed in the Mediterranean and North African theatres and first saw action in an unsuccessful day mission against a destroyer on 6 June, releasing 10 160 kg (350 lb) bombs. The aircraft were effectively used a few weeks later, with a night bombing raid over Gibraltar on 28 June 1942.

=== Gibraltar ===
The first operation to Gibraltar was almost a disaster; out of five aircraft which set out from Decimomannu in Sardinia, one (MM.22004) was forced to return due to engine trouble while the other four bombed with 66 100 kg (220 lb) and six 250 kg (550 lb) bombs. Three of them, short of fuel, were forced to land in Spain, two of which (MM.22001 and 22005) crashed or suffered some damage in forced landings. The third (MM.22007) landed in Majorca, a former Italian base in the Spanish Civil War, and thanks to the Spanish pro-Axis policy was quickly refueled and took off from Palma de Majorca for Italy. The two others remained in Spain: MM.22001 crashed on a beach when it was approaching Valencia airport and was written off, MM.22005 suffered minor damage and was stored at San Javier air base but was repaired and tested by the Spanish Air Force. Several other missions were launched until October, which resulted in some damage and further losses. An attempt to change to SM.82s was an expedient (as was the P.108, expecting more from the future P.133).

For a chronology, there were sorties to Gibraltar (without the endurance problems that dogged the first mission), during the night of 3 July (MM.22601 failed to return), 24 September (MM22004 and 22603), 20 October (MM.22002 (written off during an emergency landing after engine failure on takeoff), MM.22004, 22006 and 22007) and 21 October (MM.22602, destroyed during an emergency landing at Bône in Algeria, and two other P.108s), when the "peak" was reached. Each of these missions, involving one to four aircraft (15 sorties in total). Despite limited results, as expected from so few aircraft which included the destruction of a Hudson and some artillery positions on the ground and further unspecified damage, the strategic objective of forcing the Allies to concentrate resources to defend this British exclave had been met, in the same way that only four S.82s had forced the British to allocate defenses and resources to defend the oil refineries at Manama in the Persian Gulf during the Bombing of Bahrain in 1940. On 28 October, MM22007 force-landed in Algeria on its third sortie, making in total at least 16 sorties with one aircraft missing, two interned in Spain, two lost in Algeria and one lost in Italy.

=== Algeria and Africa ===
Following the Allied invasion of French North Africa, codenamed "Operation Torch", more losses were sustained when these aircraft flew missions over Algeria and other African targets. The Allies had over 160 warships and 250 merchant ships in the region. The Luftwaffe had 1,068 aircraft in the II and X. Fliegerkorps, the Regia had 285 aircraft in Sardinia of which 115 were torpedo-bombers. At least three were downed over Africa in this series of raids, for the most part claimed by Beaufighters. Nonetheless, in Algeria they struck targets in Bône (now called Annaba), Algiers, Blinda, Philippeville (now called Skikda), Maison Blanche and Oran.

Some ships were damaged by P.108s in the latter and Algerian raids and over other targets they destroyed some aircraft. These bombers were the only ones capable of flying the 2,000 km (1,200 mi) to Oran. The 274 Squadriglia had only eight P.108s and with them performed only 28 sorties in eight night missions, during a whole month. Three were shot down by night fighters, which on only one occasion were repelled by the wing turrets. Two P.108s were shot down by 153 Sqn Beaufighters in the attack over Algeria's port and the last of these missions was flown on 20 January. Serviceability dropped to one or two aircraft and so with the need for refurbishment, the P.108s returned to the mainland.

=== Sicily ===
The final action took place over Sicily, when the 274a was reinforced to a total of eight. They flew 12 sorties against the invasion force between 11 and 22 July. Losses included two aircraft destroyed and two others badly damaged, mainly by Beaufighter and Mosquito night fighters. Only one ship was damaged - this closed the career of the 274a and the P.108B.

The last of the 24 P.108Bs ordered was delivered in August. Of these aircraft, six were lost to enemy action (three over Algeria, two over Sicily and perhaps one over Spain), four to accidents (including the one involving Bruno Mussolini) and three to forced landings (one in Algeria and two over Spain).

== After the armistice ==
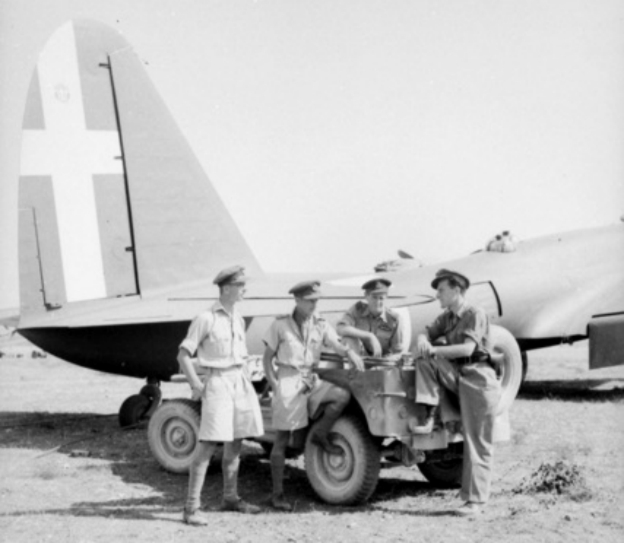
On Grottaglie airfield, Italy, pilots, Flight Lieutenant L. Wynne of Yorks, England, Squadron Leader Brian Eaton of Melbourne, Vic, Flight Lieutenant Harris DFC of Adelaide, SA, talk to an Italian pilot who has just brought his four-engine Piaggio P.108 bomber aircraft from Northern Italy.

When the armistice was declared on 8 September 1943, only nine aircraft remained. Eight were sabotaged so as not to fall into German hands, the last one was flown to southern Italy, where it was involved in a landing accident. P.108Bs ended their activities with a total of about 15 missions over Gibraltar, 28 over North Africa, 12 over Sicily and some other reconnaissance and anti-shipping sorties (of which only one is known).

This aircraft was too complex and difficult to develop without support from the Air ministry and other larger concerns, such as Fiat. None was forthcoming, and while Piaggio was still struggling to fine-tune and produce the P.108B, there were many other requests for the 'C' model airliner, the P.108T military transport, and the 'A' anti-ship versions. Finally, there was also the new strategic bomber, the P.108bis or P.133 to be developed as the "final solution" for Italian bombers, and other projects, such as the P.126, P.127, P.130 to be considered.

Following the P.108Bs' last missions, a few P.108T transports continued to be used until the end of the war, mainly on the Eastern Front when Germany needed to evacuate their encircled troops, even carrying over 100 troops at a time (maximum load was 12 tonnes/13 tons, the total payload was around 14 tonnes/15 tons). The P-108Cs and Ts proved to be more reliable than the bombers, following successful efforts to improve and modify them. One was destroyed in a flying accident over Germany, early in 1945, while the others were used until the end of the war.

== Variants ==
Production totals of the P108C and T are unclear, but combined there were approximately 16 built, with most of the P108Cs subsequently converted to the transport version.

- Prototype : MM 22001
- Series 1 : MM 22002–22008, MM 22601–22604
- Series 2 : MM 24315–24326
- Series 3 : MM 24667–24678

P.108 Prototype
P.108A Artigliere
Anti-shipping version. One built.
P.108B Bombardiere
Heavy bomber version. 24 built.
P.108C Civile
Civil transport version. Uncertain number built, but probably six.
P.108M Modificato
Intended modification of P.108B with heavier armament. None built
P.108T Trasporto
Transport version. More than 12 (including converted P.108Cs).
P.133
Advanced version of the P.108B with better engines and increased bombload. Not completed.
P.133C
Civilian (and military Transport) version of the P.133 with autonomy of 5000 km. Only studied with project in 1943.

== Operators ==
Kingdom of Italy
Regia Aeronautica
Germany
Luftwaffe

== Specifications (Piaggio P.108B) ==

Data from

General characteristics

- Crew: 6 or 7
- Length: 22.3 m (73 ft 2 in)
- Wingspan: 32 m (105 ft 0 in)
- Height: 6 m (19 ft 8 in)
- Wing area: 135 m^{2} (1,450 sq ft)
- Empty weight: 17,325 kg (38,195 lb)
- Max takeoff weight: 29,885 kg (65,885 lb)
- Powerplant: 4 × Piaggio P.XII R.C.35 18-cylinder air-cooled radial piston engine, 1,120 kW (1,500 hp) each
- Propellers: 3-bladed constant-speed propellers

Performance

- Maximum speed: 475 km/h (295 mph, 256 kn)
- Range: 3,295 km (2,047 mi, 1,779 nmi)
- Service ceiling: 10,500 m (34,400 ft)

Armament

- Guns: 6 × 12.7 mm (.5 in) Breda-SAFAT machine guns and 2 × 7.7 mm (.303 in) Breda-SAFAT machine guns
- Bombs: 3,500 kg (7,700 lb) of bombs

== See also ==
Related development

- Piaggio P.50

Aircraft of comparable role, configuration, and era

- Avro Lancaster
- Boeing B-17 Flying Fortress
- Consolidated B-24 Liberator
- Handley Page Halifax
- Heinkel He 177
- Junkers Ju 290
- Nakajima G8N
- Petlyakov Pe-8
- Short Stirling

Related lists

- List of aircraft of World War II
- List of bomber aircraft
- List of Regia Aeronautica aircraft used in World War II

== Sources ==
- Angelucci, Enzo and Paolo Matricardi. World Aircraft: World War II, Volume I (Sampson Low Guides). Maidenhead, UK: Sampson Low, 1978.
- Bignozzi, Giorgio. "The Italian 'Fortress' (part 1)." Air International Vol. 31 No. 6, December 1986. pp. 298–305, (part 2)." Air International, Vol. 32 No. 1, January 1987. pp. 29–31, pp. 47–49.
- Garello, Giancarlo. Il Piaggio P.108 (in Italian). Rome: Edizioni Bizzarri, 1973.
- Giraud, Roger (April 1976). "Les Piaggio de Bombardement, en petits raids hasardeux... (5)" [The Piaggio Bombers: Little Hazardous Raids, Part 5]. Le Fana de l'Aviation (in French) (77): 22–23. ISSN 0757-4169.
- Knox, MacGregor. Hitler's Italian Allies. Cambridge University Press, 2000. ISBN 0-521-79047-6.
- Matricardi, Paolo. Aerei Mililtari: Bombardieri e da Trasporto 2 (in Italian). Milano: Electa Mondadori, 2006.
- Mondey, David. The Hamlyn Concise Guide to Axis Aircraft of World War II. London: Bounty Books, 2006. ISBN 0-7537-1460-4.
- Pedriali, Ferdinando. "Le Fortezze Volanti Italiane. (in Italian)" RID magazine, November 1991, pp. 60–65.
- Sgarlato, Nico. "P.108, la Fortezza della Regia". (in Italian) Great Planes monographes, N.27, March 2007. Parma, Italy: West-ward edizioni.
