= Alfa Romeo 135 =

Motor Engine

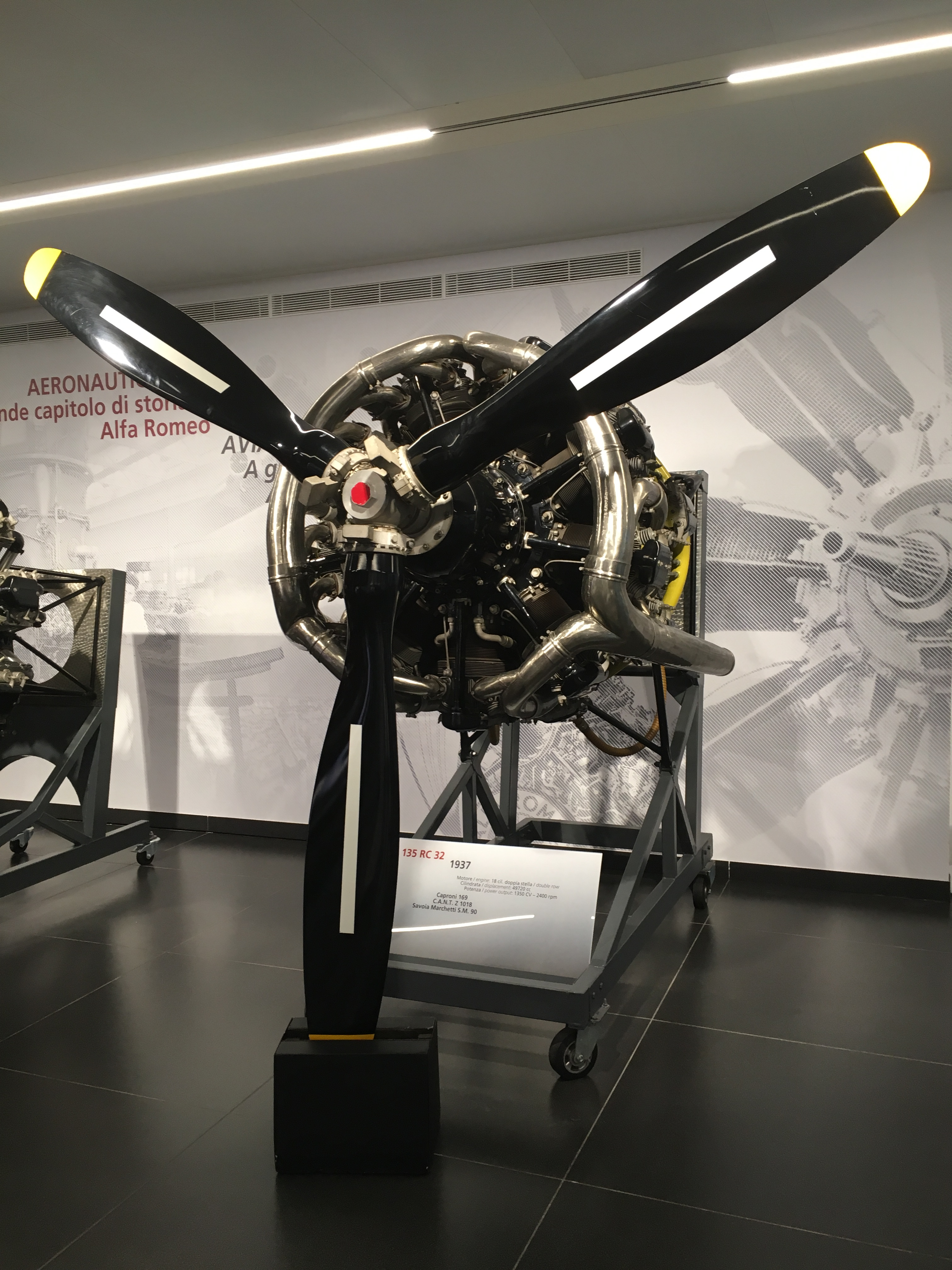
- Alfa Romeo 135 RC32
- Type: 18-cylinder radial engine
- Manufacturer: Alfa Romeo
- First run: 1938
- Number built: ~150

The Alfa Romeo 135 Tornado was an Italian 18-cylinder radial engine designed by Giustino Cattaneo in 1934–1935.

== Design and development ==
The Alfa 135 consists of two nine-cylinder radial rows, back to back, operating a two-throw crankshaft. Cattaneo left Alfa Romeo in 1936, leaving the development of the 135 to eng. Bossi and his staff, but without success. At the time of its first running in 1938 and 1939 it was one of the most powerful radial engines in the world, generating just less than 1,492 kW (2,001 hp) on 100 octane fuel, but the standard fuel available was 87 octane, with which the 135 developed 890–1,190 kW (1,200–1,600 hp).

Despite the obvious potential, this engine was affected by many reliability problems. Although many mechanical defects were addressed during testing, it suffered from overheating and vibrations so seriously that it was rejected from service. Up to 1944 approximately 150 were made, none of which were fitted in operational aircraft.

Further development resulted in the Alfa Romeo 136, but this remained a paper project before the Armistice in September 1943 intervened.

== Applications ==
- Cant Z.1018 "Leone"
- Savoia-Marchetti SM.87 (four planes)
- Savoia-Marchetti SM.82 (central engine)
- Savoia-Marchetti SM.90 (one prototype)
- Cant Z 1014 (five prototypes)
- Focke-Wulf Fw 200 "Condor" (135 R.C.34 engines supplied for testing)
- CRDA CANT Z.1018 "Leone" (136 R.C.25)

== Variants ==
136 R.C.25
Experimental derivative of the 135, probably not built, 1,765 kW (2,367 hp) at sea level, 1,360 kW (1,820 hp) at 2,500 m (8,200 ft)
135 R.C.32
1,208.03 kW (1,620 hp)
135 R.C.34
1,194 kW (1,601 hp)
135 R.C.45
136 R.C.65
Experimental derivative of the 135, probably not built, 1,618 kW (2,170 hp) for Take Off, 1,214 kW (1,628 hp) at 6,500 m (21,300 ft)
136 R.C.100
Rated at 10,000 m (33,000 ft)

== Specifications (135 R.C.32) ==
Data from Aircraft Engines of the World 1945 Archivio Storico Alfa Romeo - Volume II

=== General characteristics ===
- Type: 18-cylinder air-cooled radial engine
- Bore: 146 mm (5.7 in)
- Stroke: 165 mm (6.5 in)
- Displacement: 49.7 L (3,030 cu in)
- Length: 1,788 mm (70.4 in)
- Diameter: 1,315 mm (51.8 in)
- Dry weight: 950 kg (2,090 lb)
- Designer: Cattaneo
- Frontal Area: 1.35 m^{2} (14.5 sq ft)

=== Components ===
- Valvetrain: 2x inlet valves and 2x exhaust valves per cylinder operated by pushrods and rockers
- Supercharger: Gear-driven, 9.26:1 ratio, supercharger
- Fuel system: 1x Zenith-Stromberg NA-Z160RGSL updraught carburettor with automatic mixture and boost control
- Fuel type: 87 octane
- Oil system: 551.6 kPa (80 psi), dry sump.
- Oil grade (viscosity): 20.5 cSt (100 S.U. secs)
  - Oil consumption: 0.009 kg/(kW h) (0.015 lb/(hp h))
- Cooling system: Air-cooled
- Reduction gear: Epicyclic bevel reduction gear, 0.5:1 ratio.
- Starter: Garelli compressed air starter
- Ignition: 2x Marelli MF18 magnetoes, 2x 18 mm (0.71 in) long reach spark plugs per cylinder, fed by a shielded harness.

=== Performance ===
- Power output:
  - Take-off: 1,208 kW (1,620 hp) at 2,400 rpm
  - Military: 1,044 kW (1,400 hp) at 2,400 rpm at 3,200 m (10,500 ft)
  - Cruising: 820 kW (1,100 hp) at 1,900 rpm at 4,000 m (13,000 ft)
- Specific power: 25.03 kW/L (0.55 hp/(cu in))
- Compression ratio: 6.6:1
- Specific fuel consumption: 0.304 kg/(kW h) (0.5 lb/(hp h)) (take-off)
- Oil consumption: 0.009 kg/(kW h) (0.015 lb/(hp h))
- Power-to-weight ratio: 0.727 kW/kg (0.775 hp/lb)

== See also ==
Comparable engines

- Bristol Centaurus
- Fiat A.82
- Nakajima Homare
- Pratt & Whitney R-2800 Double Wasp
- Shvetsov ASh-73

Related lists

- List of aircraft engines
