= Dal Molin =

Dal Molin may refer to:

== People ==
- Giuseppe Dal Molin, Italian curler
- Paolo Dal Molin (b. 1987), Italian athlete
- Tommaso Dal Molin (1902–1930), Italian aviator

== Other ==
- Stadio Tommaso Dal Molin, a stadium in Arzignano, Italy
- Vicenza Airport, officially L'Aeroporto di Vicenza "Tommaso Dal Molin", a former airport in Vicenza, Italy
