= Piaggio P.32 =

Medium bomber

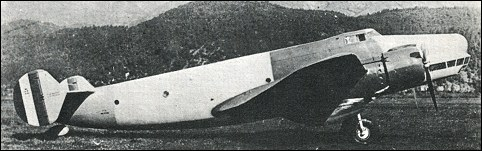

General information
- Type: Medium bomber
- Manufacturer: Piaggio Aero
- Designer: Giovanni Pegna
- Primary user: Regia Aeronautica
- Number built: 28 + 1 prototype

History
- Introduction date: 1938
- First flight: 1936
- Retired: 1939

The Piaggio P.32 was an Italian medium bomber of the late 1930s, produced by Piaggio, and designed by Giovanni Pegna. It was a modern design for its time, but was a failure due to lack of powerplants commensurate with its high wing loading.

== Design ==
The P.32 was a twin-engine monoplane with a crew of five or six. The main structure was of wood, with a glazed nose, low cockpit, twin tailfins, and a distinct 'banana' shape to the fuselage. It was armed with a dorsal turret with two 7.7 mm (0.303 in) machine guns, a ventral turret, a single machine gun in the nose, and it could carry a 1,600 kg (3,527 lb) bomb load.

Utilizing their experience of designing experimental and record-breaking aircraft like the Piaggio P.16, Piaggio P.23M, and Piaggio P.23R, Piaggio designed the P.32 with very small wings for its size. This meant a high wing loading, which required Handley-Page leading edge slats and double trailing-edge flaps to provide enough lift on takeoff and landing.

== Development ==
The development of this aircraft began with the contest announced by the Regia Aeronautica (Italian Air Force) in 1934. The P.32 was one of many contenders, and the most modern.

The prototype first flew in 1936, and was tested at Guidonia, leading to an order for 12 aircraft, followed by a second order for five. These aircraft were fitted with the 615 kW (825 hp) Isotta Fraschini Asso XI.RC inline V-12 engines, and were designated the P.32 I.

In early 1937, the P.32 Is were assigned to XXXVII Gruppo BT, 18 Stormo. The advanced wing design meant that they could be flown only by specially trained crews, but the aircraft was found to be fatally underpowered, with a maximum speed of only 386 km/h (240 mph; 208 kn), and then only with no bombs or defensive weapons carried. They were unable to fly on only one engine, and their handling qualities were inferior to the SM.79 and BR.20.

The P.32 II, fitted with more powerful 750 kW (1,006 hp) Piaggio P.XI R.C.40 radial engines was tested, and 12 were delivered in early 1938. The more powerful engines gave a better rate of climb, but the increased weight meant there was no improvement in maximum speed, while the range dropped from 1,950 to 1,700 km (1,210 to 1,060 mi; 1,050 to 920 nmi) because of higher fuel consumption.

The P.32 Bis was a redesign that brought the empty weight of the aircraft down from 6,355 to 5,700 kg (14,010 to 12,566 lb) by reducing its overall size slightly. This gave it a top speed of 378 km/h (235 mph; 204 kn) and a ceiling of 6,300 m (20,700 ft) with the Isotta Fraschini Asso XI engines, and 420 km/h (261 mph; 227 kn) and a ceiling of 8,000 m (26,000 ft) with the Piaggio P.XI R.C.40 engines. However, the prototype crashed on 25 February 1938, killing the test pilot, leading to the cancellation of further development.

The P.32 Is and IIs were taken out of service in April 1938 and were used as training aircraft. In 1939, a P.32 crashed, killing the entire crew. There is no further information about the fate of the remaining aircraft, and most likely they were scrapped soon afterwards.

== Variants ==
P.32 I
With 615 kW (825 hp) Isotta Fraschini Asso XI R.C. V-12 engines.
P. 32 II
With 750 kW (1,006 hp) Piaggio P.XI R.C.40 radial engines.
Caproni Ca.405 Procellaria
A version built by Caproni, with the wings of the P.32 and a new fuselage, specifically for the Istres-Damascus-Paris Air Race of 1937, but not completed in time. Two built, one with Isotta Fraschini Asso engines and one with Piaggio P.XI.R.C.40 engines.
P.32 Bis
A redesign built by Caproni-Reggiane (as the Ca.400). Tested with both types of engine. One prototype built.

== Operators ==
Kingdom of Italy

- Regia Aeronautica

== Specifications (P.32-I) ==
Data from Italian Civil and Military Aircraft 1930-1945

General characteristics

- Crew: 5 or 6
- Length: 16.3 m (53 ft 6 in)
- Wingspan: 18 m (59 ft 1 in)
- Height: 5.1 m (16 ft 9 in)
- Wing area: 60 m^{2} (650 sq ft)
- Empty weight: 5,738 kg (12,650 lb)
- Gross weight: 7,335 kg (16,170 lb)
- Powerplant: 2 × Isotta Fraschini Asso XI R.C. V-12 liquid-cooled piston engines, 610 kW (820 hp) each
- Propellers: 3-bladed variable-pitch propellers

Performance

- Maximum speed: 400 km/h (250 mph, 220 kn) at 5,000 m (16,000 ft)
- Landing speed: 126 km/h (78 mph; 68 kn)
- Range: 1,950 km (1,210 mi, 1,050 nmi)
- Service ceiling: 7,000 m (23,000 ft)
- Time to altitude: 4,000 m (13,000 ft) in 15 minutes

Armament

- Guns: 5 × 7.7 mm (0.303 in) Breda-SAFAT machine guns
- Bombs: 1,600 kg (3,527 lb) of bombs

== See also ==
Aircraft of comparable role, configuration, and era

- Douglas B-23 Dragon
- Fiat BR.20
- Handley Page Hampden
- Heinkel He 111
- Lioré et Olivier LeO 45
- Mitsubishi Ki-21
- Vickers Wellington

Related lists

- List of Interwar military aircraft
- List of bomber aircraft

== Bibliography ==
- Giraud, Roger (January 1976). "Les Piaggio de Bombardement (2)". Le fanatique de l'Aviation (in French). No. 74. pp. 24–27.
- Longhi, Roberto (n.d.). "Reggiane and I... a Fighter Designer Recalls". Air Enthusiast Quarterly. No. 2. pp. 214–224. ISSN 0143-5450.
