= P16 (disambiguation) =

p16 is a tumor-suppressing protein.

P16 may also refer to:

== Aircraft ==
- Berliner-Joyce P-16, a biplane fighter of the United States Army Air Corps
- FFA P-16, a Swiss prototype jet fighter
- Piaggio P.16, an Italian heavy bomber

== Other uses ==
- AMC Schneider P 16, a French halftrack
- Dongfeng Yufeng P16, a Chinese pickup truck
- Palmyra (Cooper) Airport on Palmyra Atoll
- Papyrus 16, a biblical manuscript
- Pseudomonas sRNA P16
- ThinkPad P16, a Lenovo workstation laptop

== See also ==
- 16P (disambiguation)
