= Piaggio P.2 =

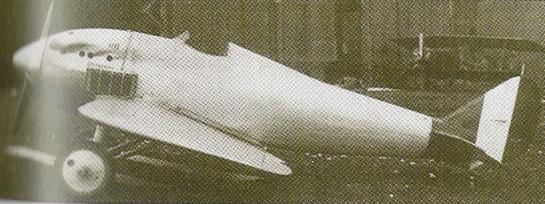

General information
- Type: Fighter
- Manufacturer: Pegna-Bonmartini and Piaggio
- Designer: Ing Giovanni Pegna
- Primary user: Regia Aeronautica
- Number built: 2

History
- Introduction date: 1924
- First flight: 1923

The Piaggio P.2 was an Italian fighter prototype of advanced design built by Piaggio in 1923.

== Design and development ==
In 1923, the Pegna-Bonmartini workshops at Sestri Ponente in Genoa, Italy, were constructing a fighter aircraft prototype designed by Ing Giovanni Pegna around the smallest airframe that could accommodate the 224-kilowatt (300-horsepower) Hispano-Suiza HS 42 eight-cylinder water-cooled engine. After the Piaggio company purchased Pegna-Bonmartini that year, construction of the prototype continued and resulted later in 1923 in the completion of the Piaggio P.2.

The P.2 was an aerodynamically clean, single-seat, low-wing, cantilever monoplane of very advanced design for the time with either a monocoque or semi-monocoque fuselage and fixed landing gear. It was built of wood, with plywood skin and fabric-covered control surfaces, and was armed with two machine guns—sources differ on whether the machine guns were of 7.62-millimeter (0.3-inch) or 12.7-millimeter (0.5-inch) caliber—synchronized to fire through the propeller. It had two radiators, one mounted on each side of the fuselage, forward of the open cockpit.

== Operational history ==
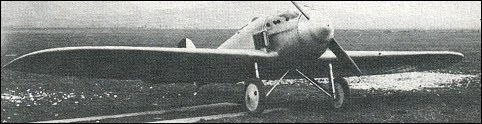

Piaggio built two P.2 prototypes and entered the P.2 in the 1923 Italian official fighter contest. The P.2 was probably ahead of its time, however; the Italian Air Ministry distrusted monoplanes at the time and the P.2's performance did not meet the level that Pegna had predicted, and for these reasons no production order followed. However, the Regia Aeronautica (Italian Royal Air Force) purchased one of the prototypes for evaluation, taking delivery of it on 23 March 1924.

== Operators ==
Kingdom of Italy

- Regia Aeronautica

== Specifications ==
General characteristics

- Crew: one
- Length: 7.00 m (22 ft 11.67 in)
- Wingspan: 10.58 m (34 ft 8.5 in)
- Height: 2.20 m (7 ft 2.67 in)
- Wing area: 20.08 m^{2} (216.15 sq ft)
- Empty weight: 867 kg (1,911 lb)
- Gross weight: 1,182 kg (2,606 lb)
- Powerplant: 1 × Hispano-Suiza HS 42 eight-cylinder water-cooled piston , 224 kW (300 hp)

Performance

- Maximum speed: 233 km/h (145 mph, 126 kn)
- Endurance: 2 hours 36 minutes

Armament

- 2 × machine guns

Notes:

- Time to 1,000 m (3,280 ft): 3 min 18 sec
