= GVV Dal Molin Roma =

Roma

General information
- Type: Amphibian flying boat glider
- National origin: Italy
- Manufacturer: Grupo Volo a Vela Tommaso Dal Molin
- Designer: Angelo Mori
- Status: sole example burnt by the German Army
- Number built: 1

History
- First flight: May 1933

The GVV Dal Molin Roma or Mori Anfibio Roma was a single-seat, amphibious flying boat glider built in Italy in 1933. Only one was constructed.

== Design and development ==
The Roma was designed by Angelo Mori and built by the Grupo Volo a Vela Tommaso Dal Molin (English: Tommaso Dal Molin Gliding Group) in Varese. It was a cantilever high-wing monoplane, its high aspect ratio, single spar wing constructed with a wooden frame and covered in plywood and fabric. It was mounted with some dihedral and in plan was straight tapered with elliptical tips. Ailerons occupied about half the span.

The fuselage of the Roma was flat sided aft of the wing, which sat on top of it. Between the trailing edge and close to the tail it was fabric covered; the rest, like the forward fuselage, was skinned with ply. All the fuselage surfaces were treated with ship's waterproof paint. The cantilever horizontal tail, mounted on the fin just above the fuselage, was slightly straight tapered. The fin was very small, serving only to mount a large, slightly curved, balanced rudder. This extended below the fuselage, moving within an elevator cut-out and partly protected by a ventral fin. The cockpit was immediately ahead of the wing leading edge, with a curved upper fuselage reaching forwards to the nose. Different cockpit enclosures were used, though the order is uncertain. One placed the pilot under a separable, multi framed canopy; with the other the pilot after entry was surrounded by a demountable ply covering which filled the larger aperture, allowing his head to emerge from within an open, circular, collared hole. The interior was lit by glazing in the cover just in front of the seat.

The Roma was an amphibian and had a single step, flying boat style hull with the step under mid-chord. Small stabilizing floats were mounted under the wings at about two-thirds span, each attached by two spanwise parallel pairs of V-struts. Land operation used a standard glider skid, running from just aft of the nose to aft of the trailing edge. A dolly was used for launches.

== Operational history ==
The Roma's first flight was in May 1933, flown by Romeo Sartori from Lake Schiranna near Varese. Plinio Rovesti later flew it from the summit of the Campo dei Fiori di Varese to Lake Maggiore, about 16 km (10 mi) away. On 16 September 1934 the Roma, flown again by Rovesti led eight Anfibio Vareses (another Mori design), bungee launched, from the Campo dei Fiori to alight at Schiranna. Rovesti continued to fly it from Campo dei Fiori and from Mottarone over local lakes. During World War II, the Roma was stored at Vizzola Ticino but was burned by retreating German occupation forces.

== Specifications ==
Data from Pedrielli (2011) p.185

General characteristics

- Capacity: One
- Length: 6.50 m (21 ft 4 in)
- Wingspan: 20 m (65 ft 7 in)
- Wing area: 20 m^{2} (220 sq ft)
- Aspect ratio: 20
- Empty weight: 165 kg (364 lb)
- Gross weight: 255 kg (562 lb)

Performance

- Maximum speed: 140 km/h (87 mph, 76 kn)
- Maximum glide ratio: estimated 26:1
- Wing loading: 12 kg/m^{2} (2.5 lb/sq ft)
