= Piaggio P.149 =

Utility and liaison aircraft

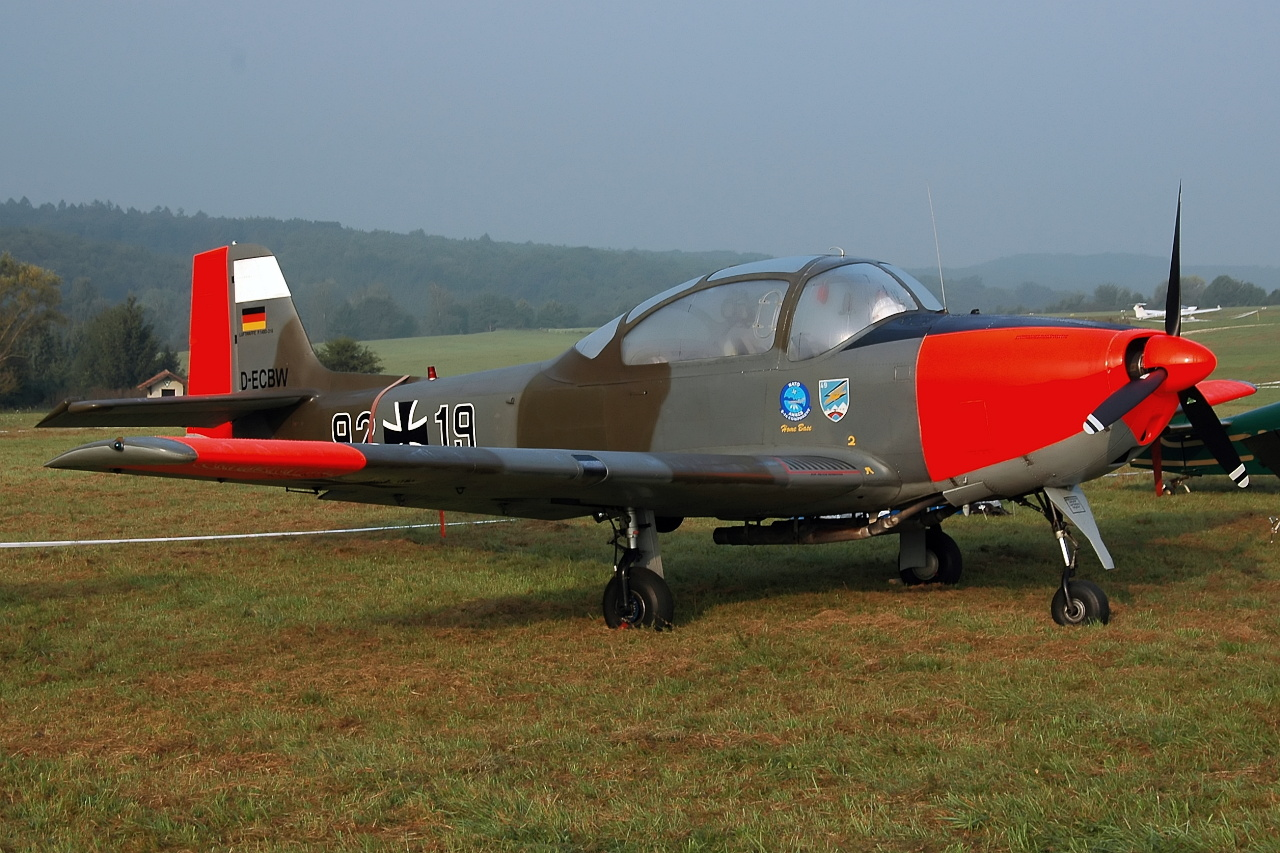

General information
- Type: Utility liaison or training monoplane
- Manufacturer: Piaggio Aero; Focke-Wulf
- Primary users: German Air Force Swissair Flying School
- Number built: 88 (Piaggio); 190 (Focke-Wulf)

History
- First flight: 19 June 1953
- Developed from: Piaggio P.148

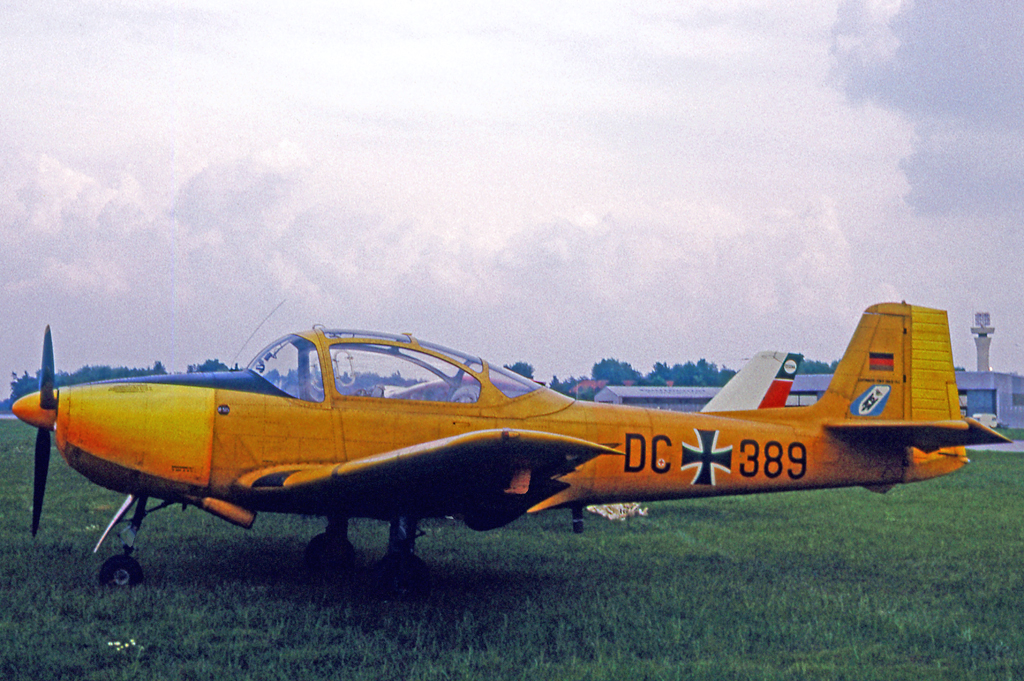
German Air Force Focke-Wulf built FWP.149D at Hanover Airport in 1966

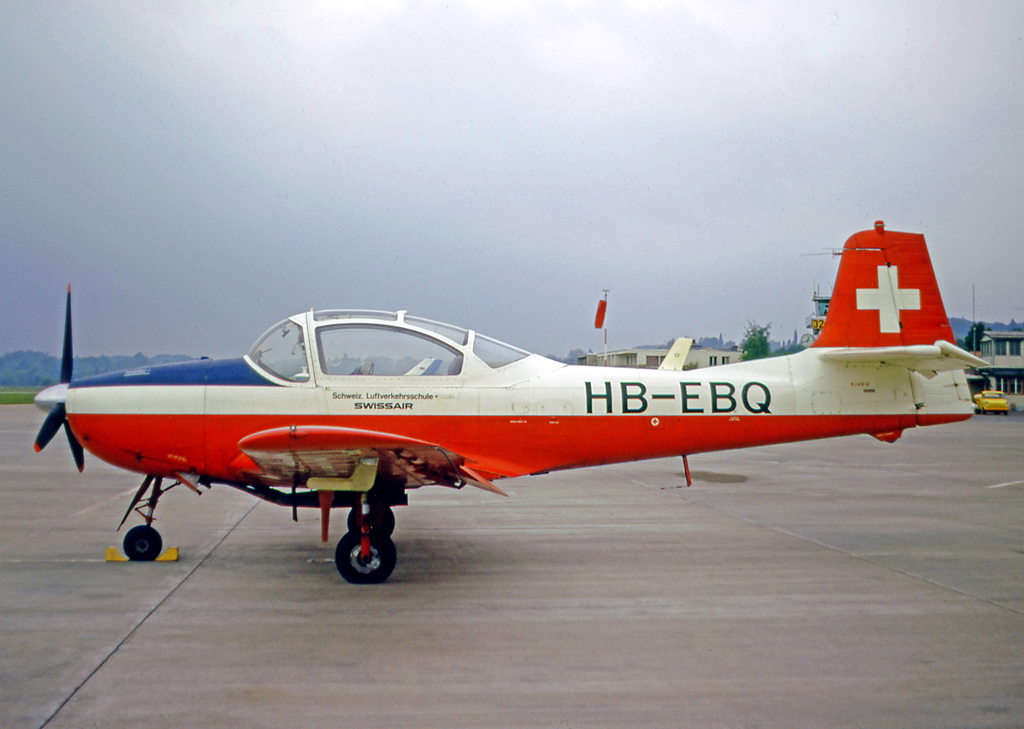
Piaggio P.149E of the Swissair Flying School at Bern (Belp) airfield in 1973

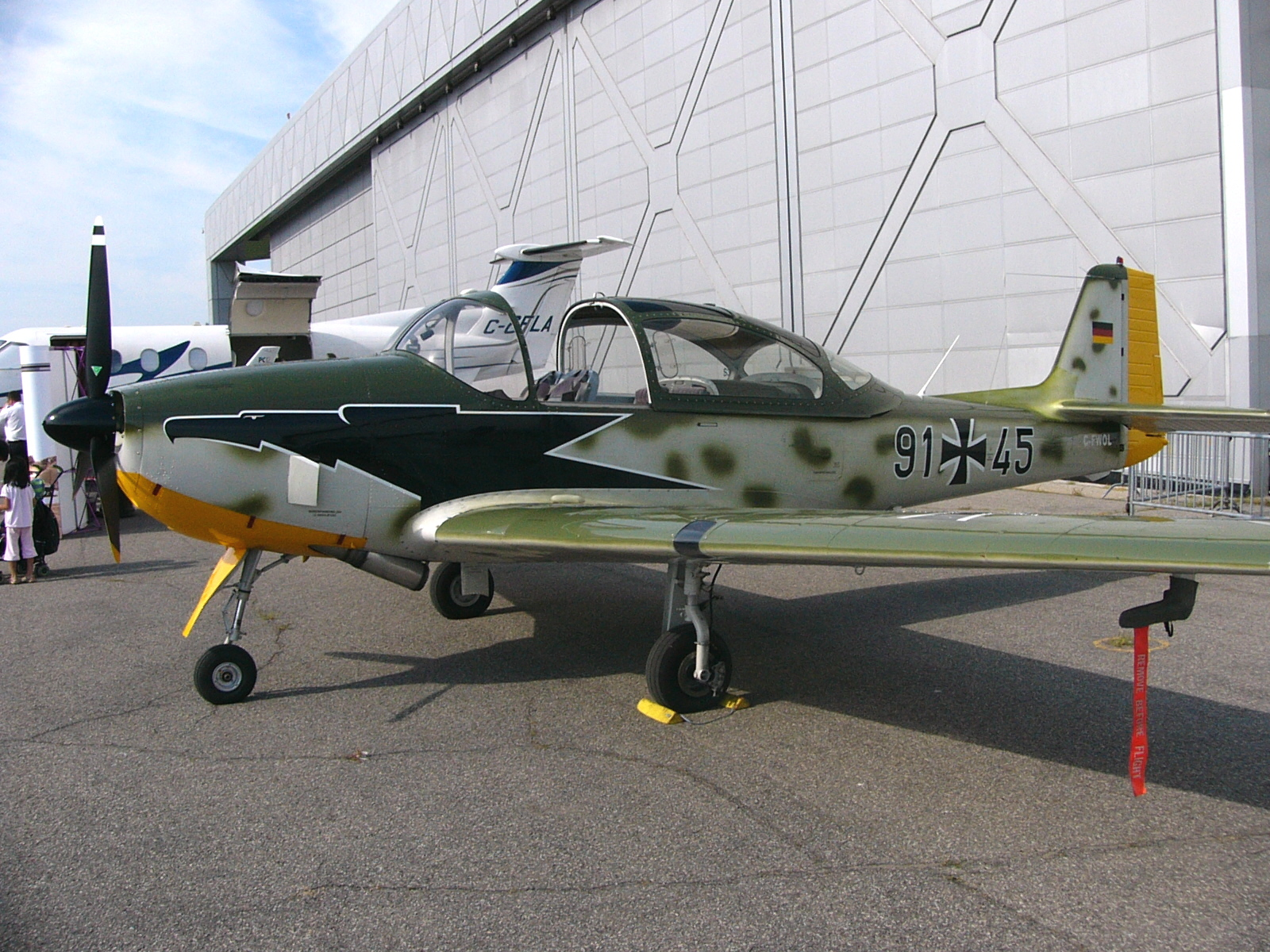
Focke-Wulf FWP. 149D in Canadian civil service

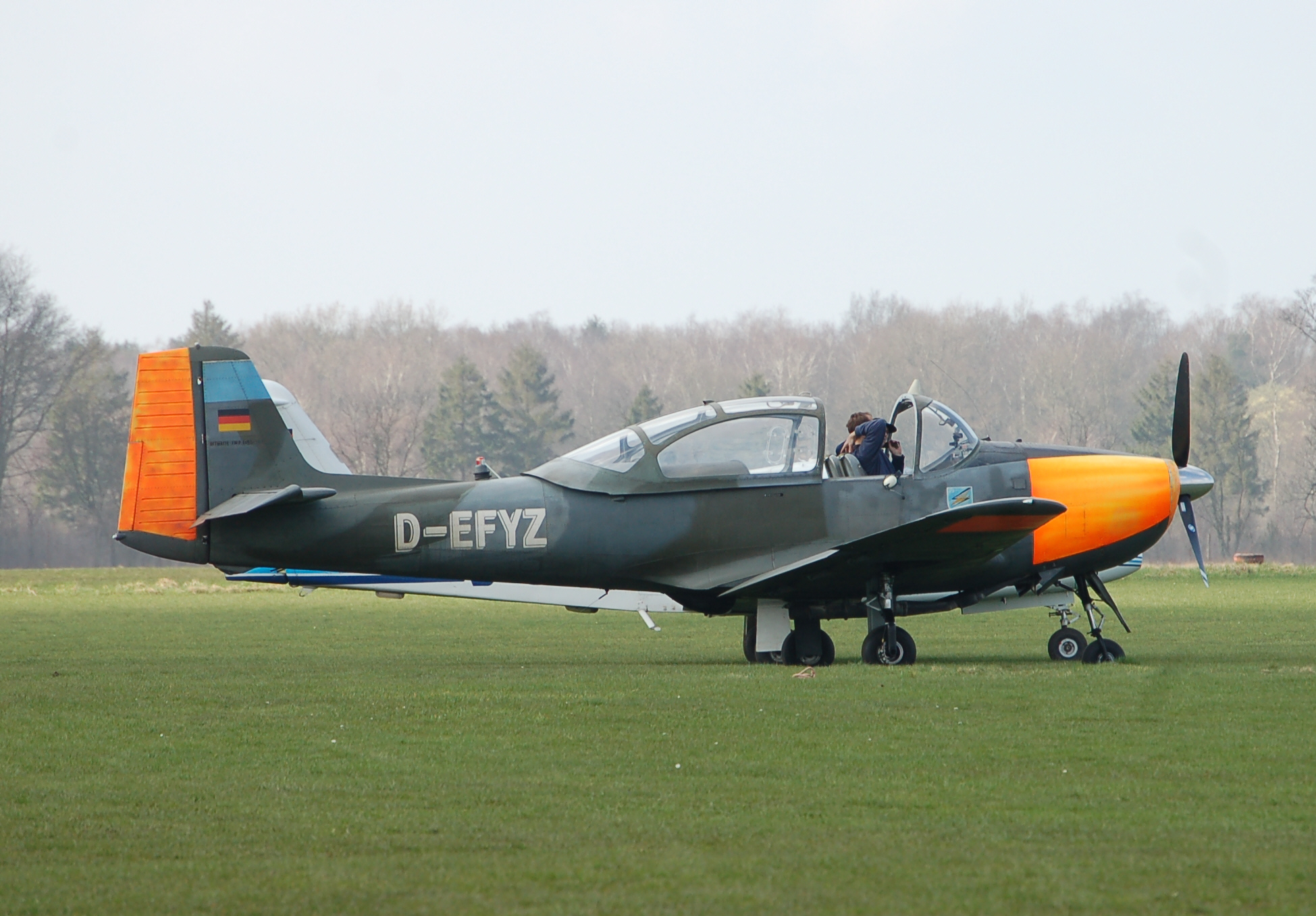
P.149D

The Piaggio P.149 is a 1950s Italian utility and liaison aircraft designed and built by Piaggio. The aircraft was built under licence by Focke-Wulf in West Germany as the FWP.149D.

== Development ==
The P.149 was developed as a four-seat touring variant of the earlier P.148. The P.149 is an all-metal, low-wing cantilever monoplane with a retractable tricycle landing gear with room for four or five occupants. The prototype first flew on 19 June 1953.

Only a few were sold, until the German Air Force selected the aircraft for a training and utility role. Piaggio delivered 76 aircraft out of a total of 88 built in Italy to Germany, while another 190 were built in Germany by Focke-Wulf.

== Operational history ==
The aircraft was operated by the German Air Force between 1957 and 1990.

Swissair's Flying School based at Bern (Belp) airfield used a small fleet of the type to provide primary instruction to trainee pilots.

== Operators ==
Germany

- German Air Force
- Marineflieger

Israel

- Israeli Air Force

Italy

- Italian Air Force operated two Piaggio P.149Ds from 1953 until 1955

Nigeria

- Nigerian Air Force operated 12 Piaggo P.149D in 1967

Switzerland

- Swissair Flying School

Tanzania

- Tanzanian Air Force

Uganda
Ugandan Air Force

== Specifications (P.149D) ==
Data from Jane's All the World's Aircraft 1958-59

General characteristics

- Crew: 2
- Capacity: 2-3
- Length: 8.8 m (28 ft 10 in)
- Wingspan: 11.12 m (36 ft 6 in)
- Height: 2.9 m (9 ft 6 in)
- Wing area: 18.81 m^{2} (202.5 sq ft)
- Aspect ratio: 6.6
- Airfoil: root: NACA 230 series; tip: NACA 4412
- Empty weight: 1,160 kg (2,557 lb)
- Gross weight: 1,680 kg (3,704 lb)
- Powerplant: 1 × Lycoming GO-480 B1A6 , 200 kW (270 hp)

Performance

- Maximum speed: 304 km/h (189 mph, 164 kn) at sea level

285 km/h (177 mph; 154 kn) at 2,000 m (6,600 ft)

- Cruise speed: 266 km/h (165 mph, 144 kn) at 2,300 m (7,500 ft) and 67% METO power
- Stall speed: 92 km/h (57 mph, 50 kn) at sea level with flaps
- Range: 1,090 km (680 mi, 590 nmi) with 30 minutes reserve
- Service ceiling: 6,050 m (19,850 ft)
- Rate of climb: 5 m/s (980 ft/min)
- Wing loading: 89.3 kg/m^{2} (18.3 lb/sq ft)
- Power/mass: 0.120 kW/kg (0.073 hp/lb)
- Take-off distance to 15 m (50 ft): 405 m (1,330 ft) in nil wind
- Landing distance from 15 m (50 ft): 315 m (1,030 ft) in nil wind

== See also ==
Related development

- Piaggio P.148

Aircraft of comparable role, configuration, and era

- IAR 823
- Orličan L-40 Meta Sokol
- Ryan Navion
