= Giovanni Pegna =

- Born: 4 January 1888; Unknown
- Died: 19 May 1961 (aged 73); Milan, Lombardy, Italy
- Occupation: Military Aeronautics Engineer

Giovanni Pegna (4 January 1888 – 19 May 1961) was an important figure in the development of Italian aviation. He was the head of the construction department of Piaggio and later of the Officine Meccaniche Reggiane, a subdivision of Caproni.

== Biography ==
Giovanni Pegna was born on 4 January 1888. In his youth, he becomes attracted by the pioneering aviation activities at the beginning of the 20th century. At age 16, in 1904, he made a series of scale models of propellers and gliders. The following year, in 1905, he enrolled at the Naval Academy in Livorno where, after six years, he graduated in shipbuilding. However, he did not abandon his aeronautical passion, and his thesis was a study on longitudinal stability applied to aircraft.

=== Military career ===
Leaving the academy, Pegna was posted to the Naval Arsenal of La Spezia, where he had the opportunity to experience his first flight as an observer in a two-seat reconnaissance [seaplane]. The experience from the flight provided Pegna with an inspiration to realize the first two of his projects in those early years — two seaplanes, though these remained only at the project design level.

Pegna became in charge of the establishment of the seaplanes department, initially at Pesaro, and then moving to Porto Corsini, Brindisi and Taranto. He realized the possibility of using seaplanes as attack aircraft equipped with a torpedo. Although he conducted some demonstration trials, his idea was not supported by his superiors.

In 1915 Pegna was transferred to Milan, assigned to the supervision of the work by aeronautics companies, which were accelerated into technological design and production due to the outbreak of World War I. Direct contact with aircraft production allowed him to realize three new projects, a seaplane and two four-engine aircraft. The construction of the first prototype was commissioned by Isotta Fraschini, and Pegna continued its development even after the official order was canceled. The military authorities believed that the company's decision had been influenced directly by Pegna, and as a result he was put trial and sentenced to three months of arrest for disobedience.

In 1917 Pegna continued his aeronautics research by designing an aircraft suitable for stratospheric flight, while he was assigned to the Air Force Technical direction. This project, however, was not viewed as being important to military uses, and it was not pursued. At the end of WWI, Pegna left the Italian Navy, taking leave in 1919 with the military rank of major.

=== Civil career ===
In 1922 Count Giovanni Bonmartini convinced Pegna to create the Pegna-Bonmartini manufacturing company. The same year Pegna began drawing a conceptually advanced military aircraft, a fighter of compact proportions.

Projects by Pegna Bommartini
Aircraft	Year	Engines	Note
Helicopter	1923	?	With 4 separate propeller blades moved by gears. Never built.
Leonardo da Vinci	1923	Fiat A.12 bis	Commercial seaplane biplane with 16 engines of transatlantic type, total weight 55 tons and 20 tons payload.
P.B.N.	1922	Hispano-Suiza 300 hp	Four-engine night bomber biplane capable of flying at 8,000 m altitude. Purchased by the Air Force Commissioner, it became the Piaggio P.3 with SPA 6A engines.
P.B.N. High altitude	1922	Hispano-Suiza 300 hp	High-altitude four-engine night bomber biplane capable of flying at 8,000 m altitude with single compressor for all engines. Capable of 240 km/h.
Rondine	1923	A.B.C. 3 1/2 hp	Small ultra-light single-seater touring airplane, successfully tested by Renato Donati, never mass-produced.
Rondone	1923	A.B.C. 3 1/2 hp	Like the Rondine but a two-seater, it became the Piaggio P.1.

In 1923, when the prototype was already in an advanced state of construction, Rinaldo Piaggio, owner of Piaggio Aero Industries, which until then had dealt with nautical decor and railway equipment, decided to further diversify its business by hiring Pegna to develop the aviation industry. In the face of opposition from Bonmartini to leave his partner, Piaggio completely took over the company.

In the following years Pegnae continued to work as a designer. As the technical director for Piaggio, he continued to design various models, mainly seaplanes, including the Piaggio p.6.

In 1936 moved to Reggiane (group Caproni).

Pegna is especially known for his unconventional aircraft designs for the time, such as seaplanes Piaggio P.7 designed in 1928 to compete in the Schneider Trophy, and the flying wing long experienced in "aviation city" of Guidonia (DSSE) throughout the pre-war.
His other interesting projects were the Piaggio P.32 and Caproni-Reggiane Ca.405 C.

== See also ==
- Bastianelli PRB 1
- Alberto Faraboschi
