= Piaggio P.3 =

P.3
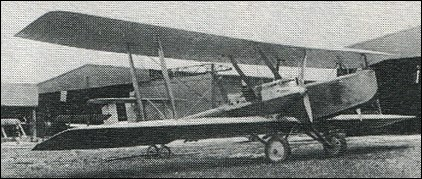

General information
- Type: Night bomber
- Manufacturer: Piaggio
- Designer: Giovanni Pegna
- Primary user: Regia Aeronautica

History
- First flight: 1923

The Piaggio P.3 was an Italian night bomber prototype built by Piaggio in 1923.

== Design and development ==
Designed by Ing Giovanni Pegna, the P.3 was a four-engine, two-bay biplane with wings of unequal span, the lower wing being greater in span than the upper. Its four 149-kilowatt (200-horsepower) S.P.A. 6A engines were mounted in tandem pairs on the lower wing, with each engine driving one of four propellers, two mounted in a tractor and two in a pusher configuration. The P.3's tail was of biplane configuration with three rudders mounted between the two planes. The crew of four consisted of a pilot, co-pilot, nose gunner, and rear gunner; the pilot and co-pilot sat side by side in a cockpit just ahead of the wings, the nose gunner manned a machine gun mounted in a cockpit in front of them, and the rear gunner manned two machine guns, one in an amidships cockpit behind the pilots and another mounted in a ventral tunnel for defense against attacks from below.

The P.3 made its first flight in 1923, and Piaggio later installed two 306-kilowatt (410-horsepower) Fiat A.20V engines on the aircraft. However, the Regia Aeronautica (Italian Royal Air Force) did not place a production order for the P.3.

== Operators ==
Kingdom of Italy

- Regia Aeronautica

== Specifications (S.P.A. 6A engines) ==
General characteristics

- Crew: 4
- Wingspan: 24 m (78 ft 9 in)
- Powerplant: 4 × S.P.A. 6A piston , 149 kW (200 hp) each

Performance

- Maximum speed: 185 km/h (115 mph, 100 kn)

Armament

- 3 × machine guns
