= Piaggio P.10 =

General information
- Type: Reconnaissance biplane floatplane
- National origin: Italy
- Manufacturer: Piaggio

History
- First flight: 1932

The Piaggio P.10 was a 1930s Italian three-seat reconnaissance biplane floatplane produced by Piaggio.

== Design and development ==
The P.10 was a single-bay biplane which was designed to be catapult launched from Italian Navy battleships and cruisers. It had a single main float supplemented by small floats, one on each wingtip. The P.10 was powered by a 440 hp (328 kW) licence-built Bristol Jupiter VI radial engine. The aircraft had three open cockpits, one forward of the wings for the pilot, further aft was a cockpit for a gunner, just in front of the tailplane was the third cockpit for the observer. A landplane variant, the P.10bis, had a fixed landing gear.

== Specifications (P.10) ==
Data from The Illustrated Encyclopedia of Aircraft

General characteristics

- Crew: 3 (pilot, gunner and observer)
- Length: 10.27 m (33 ft 8 in)
- Wingspan: 13.80 m (45 ft 3.25 in)
- Height: 4.27 m (14 ft 0 in)
- Wing area: 46.45 m^{2} (500.0 sq ft)
- Powerplant: 1 × Bristol Jupiter IV radial engine, licence built by Piaggio. , 328 kW (440 hp)

Performance

- Maximum speed: 195 km/h (121 mph, 105 kn)

Armament

- One 7.62mm (0.3in) machine gun, ring mounted on gunners cockpit.

== See also ==
Related lists

- List of Interwar military aircraft
- List of flying boats and floatplanes
