= Savoia-Marchetti S.65 =

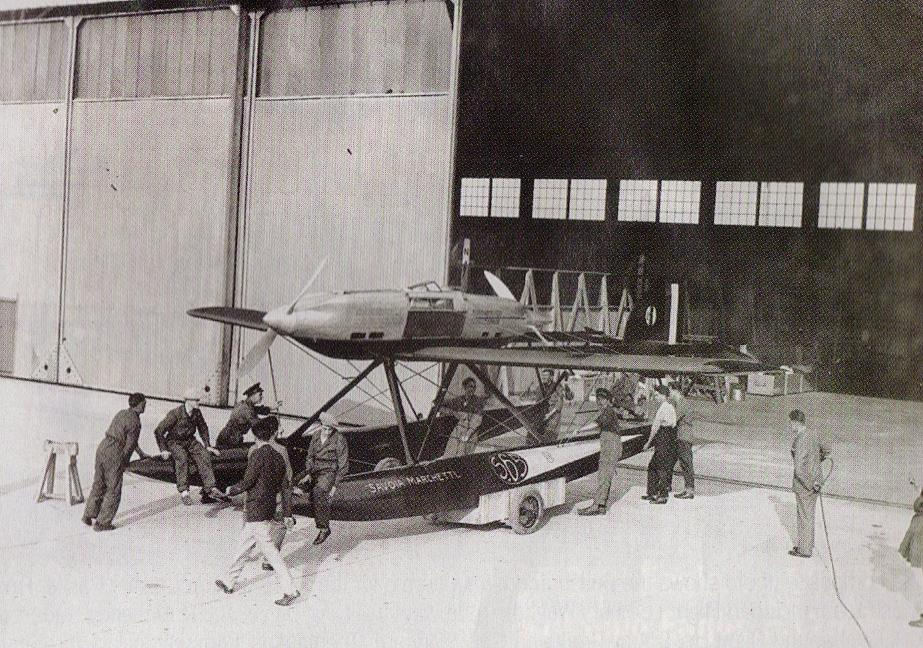

General information
- Type: Racing seaplane
- National origin: Italy
- Manufacturer: Savoia-Marchetti
- Number built: 1

History
- First flight: 1929

The Savoia-Marchetti S.65 was an Italian racing seaplane built for the 1929 Schneider Trophy race.

== Design and development ==
The S.65 was a single-seat twin-engine floatplane of low-wing monoplane configuration with two floats. Its tailplane was supported by two booms and the floats, which extended well toward the rear of the aircraft. Its two 745-kilowatt (1,000-horsepower) Isotta Fraschini engines were mounted in tandem, each driving a two-bladed propeller, one in the nose in a tractor configuration and the other at the rear of the fuselage in a pusher configuration.

== Operational history ==
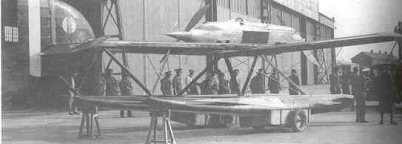

The S.65 was excluded from the 1929 race due to mechanical problems, and Italy was instead represented in the race by one Macchi M.52R and two Macchi M.67 seaplanes.

The first test flight was carried out on 18 January 1930 by Tommaso Dal Molin of the Italian Schneider Trophy racing team. The aircraft accelerated well on the water and, after takeoff, flew for about 300 metres. At an altitude of 25 metres and a speed of approximately 200 km/h, the aircraft suddenly plunged almost vertically into Lake Garda in northern Italy. The test pilot Tommaso Dal Molin was thrown from the aircraft and died instantly.

Although the exact cause of the accident was never determined, it is believed that the two Isotta Fraschini Asso 2-500RI engines were not running in synchronization. This likely caused a forward pitching tendency during acceleration that could no longer be counteracted by the tail. When the tail failed under the excessive load, the S.65 plunged almost vertically into the water. The project was subsequently abandoned, and the second S.65 was placed in the SIAI museum, where it remained until 1939.

== Operators ==
Kingdom of Italy

== Specifications ==
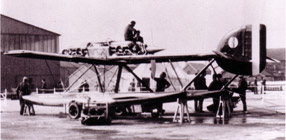

Data from

General characteristics

- Powerplant: 2 × Isotta Fraschini Asso 750 W-18 liquid-cooled piston engines, 750 kW (1,000 hp) each

Performance

- Maximum speed: 640 km/h (400 mph, 350 kn) estimated

== See also ==
- Savoia-Marchetti
- Schneider Trophy

Related lists

- List of seaplanes and flying boats
