= Piaggio P.148 =

1951 Italian trainer aircraft

P.148
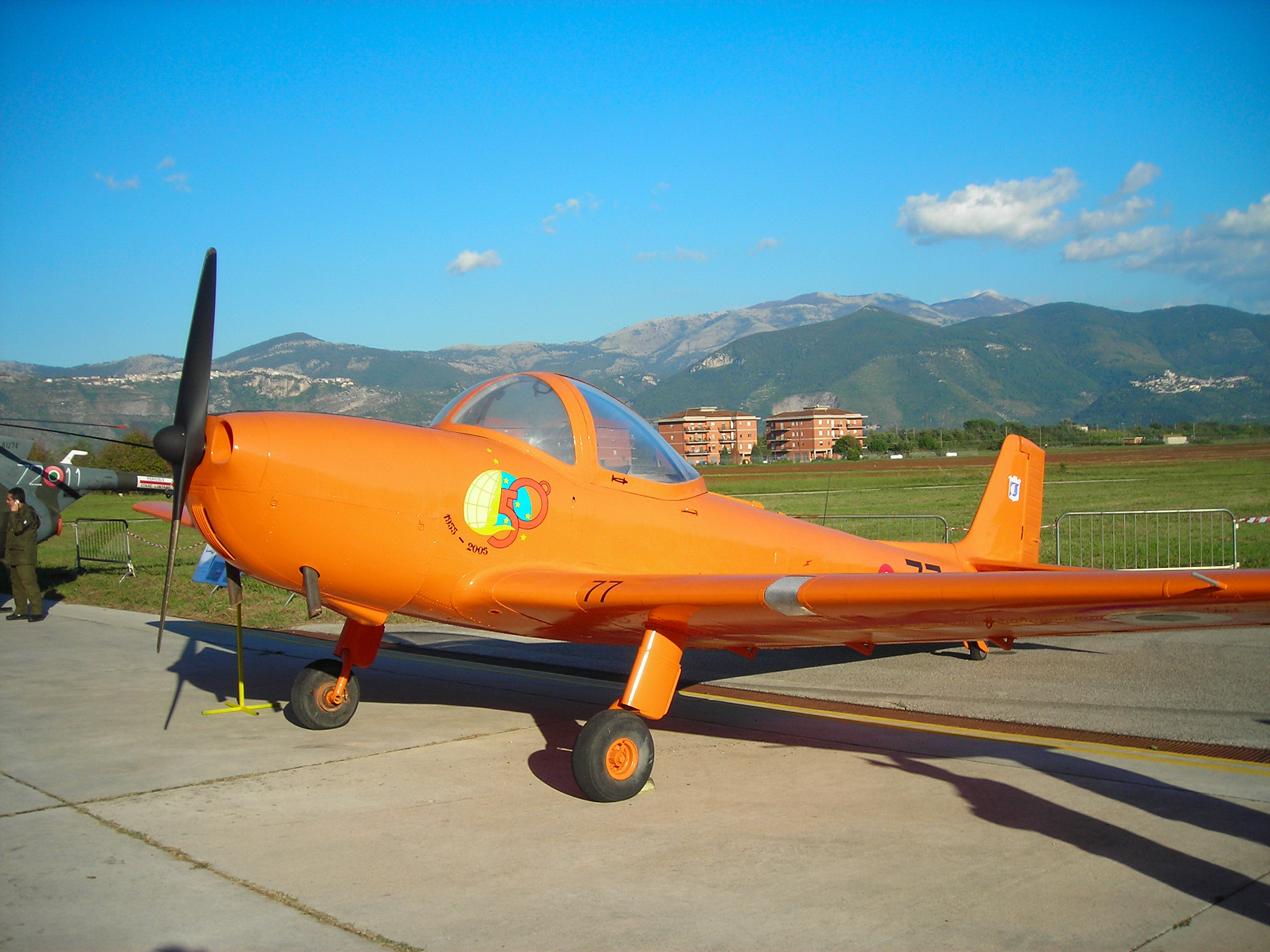

General information
- Type: Two-seat primary/aerobatic trainer
- National origin: Italy
- Manufacturer: Piaggio Aero
- Status: Active
- Primary users: Italian Air Force Somali Air Corps
- Number built: 100+

History
- First flight: February 12, 1951
- Variant: Piaggio P.149

The Piaggio P.148 is a 1950s Italian two-seat primary or aerobatic training monoplane designed and built by Piaggio Aero.

== Design and development ==
The P.148 was an all-metal low-wing cantilever monoplane with fixed tailwheel landing gear. It offered room for two occupants in side-by-side seating as well as an optional third seat. The prototype first flew on the 12 February 1951 and after testing by the Italian Air Force was ordered into production for the air force primary training schools. A four-seat variant was developed as the P.149.

== Operational history ==
Although successfully introduced into the Italian Air Force service, the P.148 was withdrawn from use with the introduction of an all-jet training programme. In 1970, the aircraft was re-introduced into the Italian Air Force Service, when the basic piston-engine aircraft regained a role in the selection of pilots. Some aircraft were sold by the Air Force to the Somali Air Corps as trainers.

== Operators ==
Italy

- Italian Air Force operated 70 aircraft from 1951 until 1979

== Former Operators ==
Somalia

- Somali Air Corps - Retired

== Specifications (P.148) ==
Data from Jane's All the World's Aircraft 1956–57

General characteristics

- Crew: One
- Capacity: Two passengers
- Length: 8.44 m (27 ft 8 in)
- Wingspan: 11.12 m (36 ft 6 in)
- Height: 2.40 m (7 ft 10 in)
- Wing area: 18.81 m^{2} (202.5 sq ft)
- Aspect ratio: 6.6:1
- Empty weight: 876 kg (1,931 lb)
- Gross weight: 1,280 kg (2,822 lb)
- Fuel capacity: 169 L (45 US gal; 37 imp gal)
- Powerplant: 1 × Lycoming O-435-A air-cooled flat-six engine, 140 kW (190 hp)
- Propellers: 2-bladed Piaggio P.1031 metal constant-speed propeller

Performance

- Maximum speed: 234 km/h (145 mph, 126 kn) at sea level
- Cruise speed: 204 km/h (127 mph, 110 kn) at 900 m (3,000 ft)
- Range: 923 km (574 mi, 498 nmi)
- Endurance: 4.5 hr
- Service ceiling: 5,000 m (16,400 ft)
- Time to altitude:
  - 3 min 40 s to 1,000 m (3,300 ft)
  - 26 min 40 s to 4,000 m (13,000 ft)

== See also ==
Related development

- Piaggio P.149
