= Piaggio Aerospace =

Multinational aerospace manufacturing company headquartered in Genoa

Coordinates: 44.0444135°N 8.1276593°E

Baykar Piaggio Aerospace S.p.A.,
- Formerly: Piaggio Aero Industries
- Type: Subsidiary
- Industry: Aerospace
- Founded: 1884; 142 years ago
- Founder: Rinaldo Piaggio
- Headquarters: Genoa, Italy
- Key people: Haluk Bayraktar (Chairman); Selçuk Bayraktar (CTO); Giovanni Tomassini (CEO)
- Products: Aircraft; aero engines
- Parent: Baykar
- Website: www.piaggioaerospace.it

Baykar Piaggio Aerospace S.p.A., formerly known as Piaggio Aero Industries, is a multinational aerospace manufacturing company headquartered in Villanova d'Albenga, Italy. The company designs, develops, manufactures and maintains aircraft, aero-engines, aerospace components and aerostructures. The company is a subsidiary of Turkish defence company Baykar.

Established in 1884 as Rinaldo Piaggio S.p.A., it shares its ancestry with motor vehicle manufacturer Piaggio and is one of the world's oldest aircraft manufacturers, having produced its first aircraft during 1915. The company's facilities were rebuilt following the Second World War and several original designs, including the P.136 seaplane, the P.149 trainer aircraft, and the P.166 utility transport, were released during the first two decades of the postwar era. During the 1960s, Piaggio began manufacturing jet engines as well. During 1966, the business was separated into the aviation-focused Piaggio Aero and the motor scooter manufacturer Vespa.

During the 1980s, Piaggio developed a new generation business aircraft, the P.180 Avanti. During the late 1990s, Piaggio underwent drastic changes following its bankruptcy. The company was negatively impacted by the Great Recession and the downturn in the business aircraft market. During late 2018, the company entered into receivership after having declared itself insolvent. The firm owns a subsidiary in the United States, Piaggio America, located in West Palm Beach, Florida. In 2021, Piaggio America filed for Chapter 11 bankruptcy.

On 27 December 2024, Piaggio Aerospace was acquired by Baykar, a Turkish defense company.

== History ==
=== Under Piaggio ownership and management ===
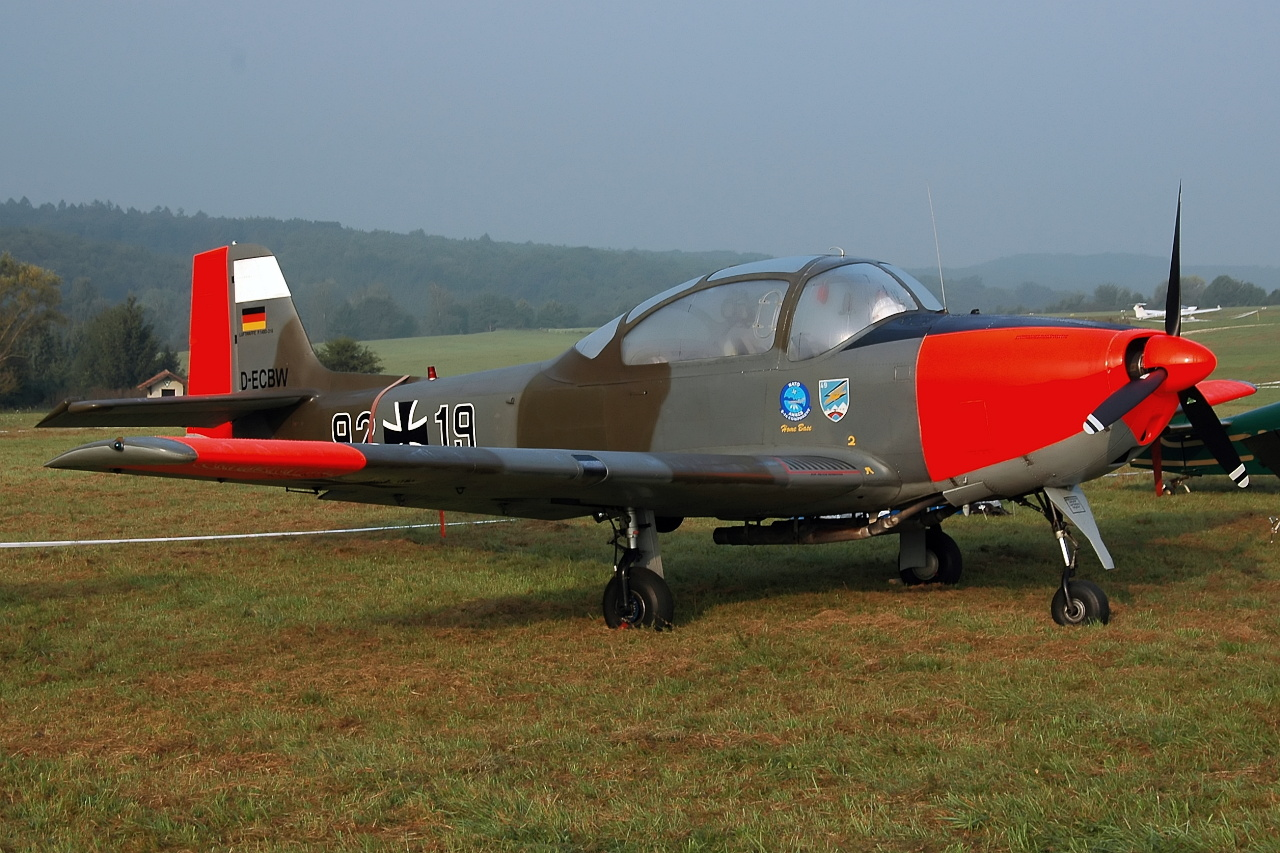
A Piaggio P.149

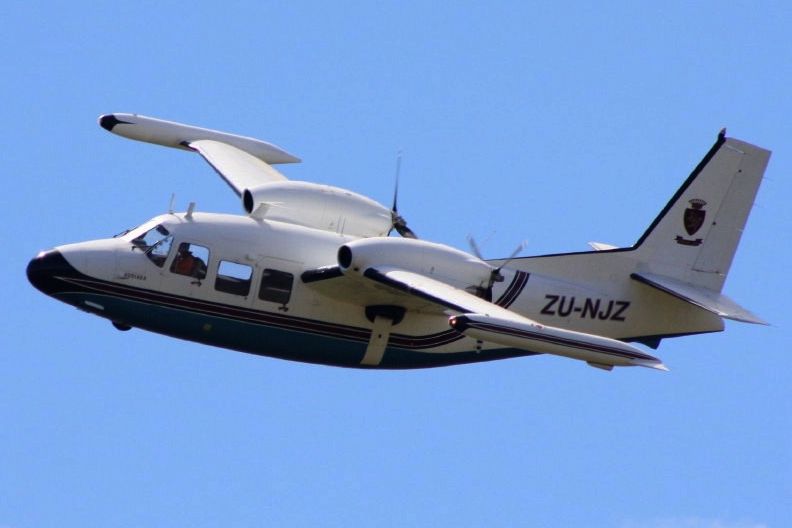
A Piaggio P.166 in flight

The Rinaldo Piaggio S.p.A company was founded in Sestri Ponente, Genoa, Italy in 1884. Originally, the company was involved in the outfitting of ocean liners and the manufacturing of rolling stock for the developing Italian railway infrastructure around the turn of the century. From the financial gains that it had garnered from these industries, Rinaldo Piaggio was able to construct a large factory based in Finale Marina or Finalmarina during 1906. In 1915 the company acquired the Officine Aeronautiche Francesco Oneto and began producing materials for the aeronautical industry.

The 1920s was a particularly turbulent and influential period in the company's history; Piaggio Aero brought on two new aeronautical engineers, Giovanni Pegna and Giuseppe Gabrielli, who both played a major role in developing Piaggio's aeronautical sector. Penga and Gabrielli worked together to create numerous technical solutions to aviation problems; to support their aerodynamic research, in 1928, Piaggio completed a new wind tunnel.

During 1938, Senator Rinaldo Piaggio died at 71 years old, thus ending the Rinaldo Piaggio era. That same year, the firm finished construction of the new Piaggio P.108 heavy bomber, its first four-engined aircraft.

In 1948, Piaggio launched the Piaggio P.136, a twin-engine seaplane that was operated by the Italian Air Force and various other operators, often in liaison/sea transport capacity. The company also benefited from an increased demand for basic aircraft training; during 1953, the German Air Force ordered 265 Piaggio P.149 trainers. By 1957, Piaggio had also developed the Piaggio P.166, a twin-engine light transport aircraft, which was marketed and produced for military customers and civilian personnel worldwide.

=== The joint venture between Piaggio and Douglas Aircraft Company ===
In 1960, Piaggio secured a production license for the Rolls-Royce Viper turbojet engine; shortly thereafter, the firm began manufacturing jet engines. Four years later, it built its first jet-powered aircraft, the Piaggio PD.808 business aircraft.

=== The separation between the aeronautical and motorcycle divisions ===
In the 1960s, both motorcycle and aeronautical production continued until 1964, the year in which the two divisions were officially split into two separate companies: aeronautical production continued with Armando (and later with Rinaldo, the founder's namesake grandson) in the Sestri Ponente plant under the name of Industrie Aeronautiche e Meccaniche Rinaldo Piaggio, while with Enrico Piaggio the Vespa was produced in the Pontedera plant.

Old Piaggio Aero logo

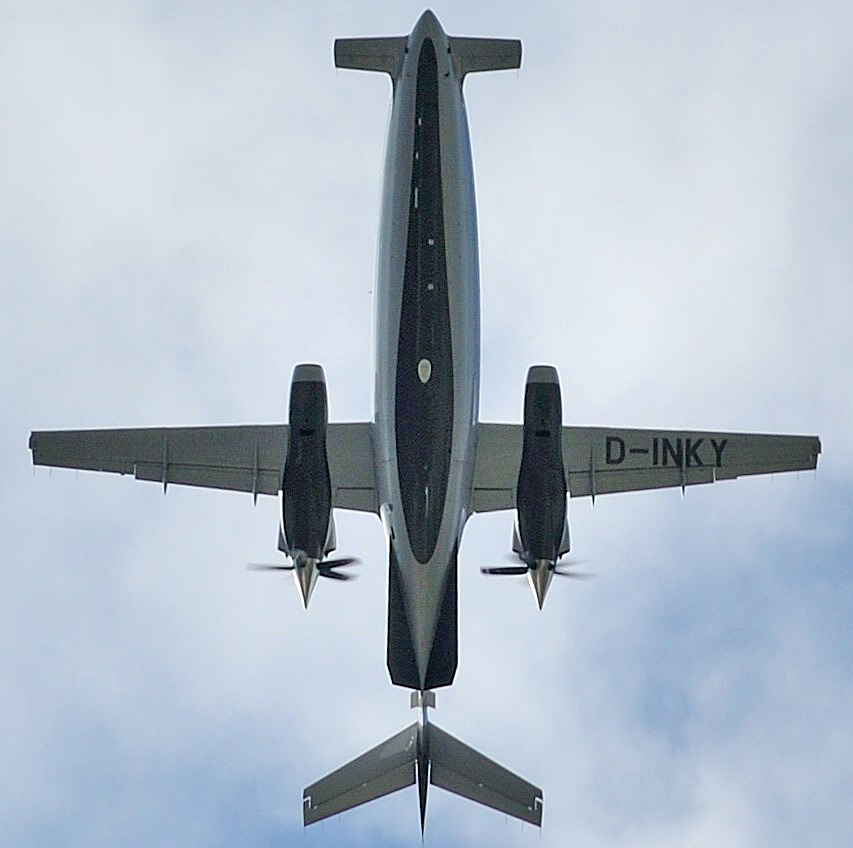
Planform view of the Piaggio P.180 Avanti, highlighting its unusual design

=== The success of the P.180 Avanti ===
During the 1980s, Piaggio developed a new generation business aircraft, the P.180 Avanti; During 1990, the Avanti received type certification from multiple aviation authorities and entered service shortly thereafter. The aircraft was aimed at business and executive clients and its confirmed the fastest turboprops in its category, versatile and exclusive.

=== The crisis and bankruptcy ===
However, in the 90s, the strong competition in the business aircraft market with business jets, led the company into crisis and subsequently into bankruptcy.

=== Under Turkish holding company Tushav control ===
During the late 1990s, Piaggio's ownership went through multiple drastic changes following the firm's bankruptcy. During November 1998, it was announced that Turkish holding company Tushav had taken control of Piaggio; it was rebranded as Piaggio Aero Industries shortly thereafter. In the years that followed, an increasingly large stake in the company was acquired by a group of entrepreneurs headed by the Josè Di Mase and Piero Ferrari. During 2000, Tushav decided to surrender its interest in Piaggio Aero Industries; the entity had once held a controlling 51% stake in the company, but this hold had reduced in favour of new Italian investors buying into Piaggio.

=== Under Ferrari and Di Mase control and management ===
In 2000 the company was under the control and management of Piero Ferrari and Di Mase and recovered from the crisis of the 90s, with the success of the Avanti and the certification of the Avanti II in 2005. With an order of 36 P.180 Avanti II by Avantair, a New Jersey company, worth almost € 200M, the company emerged from the crisis, becoming a leader in the production of executive aircraft.

During 2006, the Abu Dhabian Mubadala Development Company acquired a 35% stake in Piaggio Aero Industries S.p.A.; Mubadala is a wholly owned investment vehicle of the Government of the Emirate of Abu Dhabi, in the United Arab Emirates. Two years later, the Indian multinational conglomerate Tata Group acquired a one-third stake in Piaggio Aero Industries, becoming one of the primary shareholders alongside Piero Ferrari, the Di Mase family and the Mubadala Development Company. As part of the acquisition, Tata gained the right to appoint three of the nine seats on the board, and one of the three seats on the management committee.

Starting in 2006, Piaggio was developing a new twin-engined jet, commonly referred to as the Piaggio P1XX; however, during August 2010, the company announced that it had decided to postpone the production phase. This did not represent an absolute termination; for years following the project being put on hold, Piaggio publicly speculated on the possible launch of the programme. In 2009, Piaggio Aero sponsored the helmets of Scuderia Ferrari, a team that included Formula One drivers Felipe Massa, Giancarlo Fisichella, Kimi Räikkönen, and Luca Badoer. The company was negatively impacted by the Great Recession, the event having caused a downturn in the market for business aircraft; reportedly, deliveries of its P.180 Avanti declined drastically from 30 aircraft during 2008 to only four per year by 2018. Instead of focusing on this declining market, Piaggio decided to orientate itself towards the special missions sector, developing the Piaggio-Selex P.1HH Hammerhead, an unmanned long-endurance intelligence, surveillance and reconnaissance derivative of its P.180 Avanti. The platform was also adapted into a maritime patrol aircraft, as well as for additional special purposes, around this same timeframe. In parallel with these programmes, the company continued to make improvements to the base P.180 Avanti, introducing an extended-range model during 2013. During 2013, Mubadala and Tata injecting an additional €190 million into Piaggio Aero Industries, increasing their combined stakes to 85.5%.

=== Under Mubadala control and management ===
The new Avanti EVO is presented in May 2014. In October 2014, Piaggio Aero changed its name to Piaggio Aerospace. In November 2014, the new Villanova d'Albenga plant was inaugurated in the presence of the Italian Prime Minister, Matteo Renzi, and the Minister of Defense Roberta Pinotti.

During 2015, the Mubadala Development Company acquired 100% of the capital stock, assuming full control of Piaggio, after obtaining the final 1.95% of the stock from Piero Ferrari.

On 3 December 2018, Piaggio Aerospace was admitted into receivership after having declared itself insolvent. The company's restructuring plan had failed less than a year after its owner, Mubadala, had injected €255 million and repurchased its bank debt.

=== Under the control of extraordinary commissioners appointed by the Italian government ===
In December 2018, the company entered the extraordinary receivership proceedings with the appointment of Vincenzo Nicastro as Extraordinary Commissioner. The same applied later to its subsidiary Piaggio Aviation. According to two different decrees of the Italian Ministry of Enterprises and Made in Italy signed on 1 March 2023, the Group is now led by three Extraordinary Commissioners: the aforementioned Vincenzo Nicastro, Davide Rossetti (coordinator) and Carmelo Cosentino (industry and aviation expert).

During February 2020, it was announced that Piaggio Aerospace had been put up for sale.

During the extraordinary management by the commissioners, the company is restructured and in 2022 it closes the 2021 financial year with a turnover of approximately 152 million euros, with an order portfolio of around 500 million euros and new orders for a further approximately 180 million euros.

=== Acquired by Baykar ===
In December 2024, the Turkish Baykar Technologies drone manufacturer took over the ownership of Piaggio Aerospace.

== Operations ==
=== Facilities ===
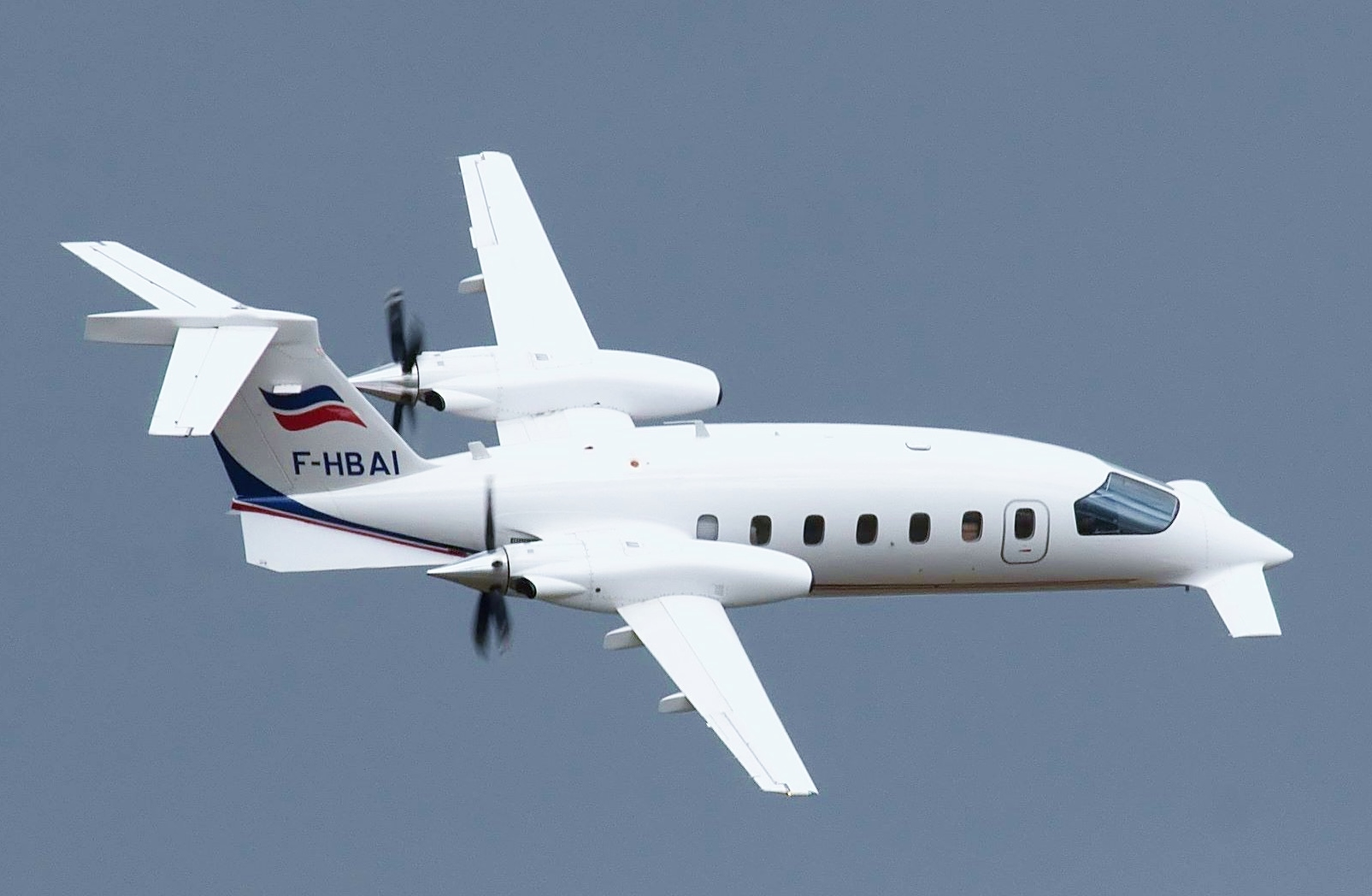
Piaggio P.180 Avanti

Piaggio Aero Industries has production facilities covering 120,000 square meters (1.3 million square feet) in the northwest Italian cities of Sestri Ponente, Genoa and Finale Ligure, as well as a High Technology Center based in Pozzuoli, near Naples. The final aircraft assembly and flight testing of aircraft is located at main facility in Genoa, which includes the corporate headquarters. Also located here is the Company's new JAR 145 certified service center, which offers full service and support to Piaggio P.180 Avanti customers as well as other aircraft. Piaggio Aero also operates two additional service centers, one at Rome's Ciampino Airport and the other at the Pratica di Mare Air Base.

Aircraft and engine component manufacturing operations, general engineering, and engine maintenance and overhaul are all undertaken at Finale Ligure. Operations include a maintenance center and two production areas, one for engines and sheet metal parts, another for major aircraft sub-assemblies and aero structures. The High Technology Center is located in the Campania region of Italy, near Naples, focuses on aero structure design and systems research. It includes the Piaggio High Technology (PHT) division, a corporate research facility which focuses on aeronautical technologies. The PHT division is a joint partnership between Piaggio Aero Industries, the Italian Aerospace Research Centre (CIRA), and other European research centers.

During the 2010s, Piaggio Aero constructed a new modern manufacturing facility in Villanova d'Albenga, about 70 kilometers west of Genoa. Designed around the principles of lean manufacturing technologies, this plant enabled increases in production efficiency via an optimised workflow, as well as production capacity.

=== Aero engines ===
A major portion of Piaggio's work has been in the aero engines sector; the company has claimed to be the only aircraft manufacturer that also builds and maintains aero engines. It has been involved in component manufacture, as well as maintenance, repair and overhaul operations on jet, turboshaft and turboprop engines, from various international major manufacturers, including Rolls-Royce and Honeywell.

== Aircraft models ==
- Piaggio P.1 (single-engine low-wing single-seat monoplane) (1922)
- Piaggio P.2 (single-engine low-wing single-seat monoplane fighter prototype) (1923)
- Piaggio P.3 (four-engine biplane night bomber prototype) (1923)
- Piaggio P.6 (reconnaissance floatplane) (1927)
- Piaggio P.7 (also known as the Piaggio-Pegna P.c.7, high-wing racing monoplane for the 1929 Schneider Trophy seaplane race; unflown) (1929)
- Piaggio P.8 (single-engine parasol wing single-seat reconnaissance floatplane) (1928)
- Piaggio P.9 (single-engine high-wing two-seat monoplane) (1929)
- Piaggio P.10 (single-engine three-seat biplane floatplane) (1931)
- Piaggio P.11 (single-engine single-seat lightweight biplane fighter; licensed copy of the Blackburn Lincock) (1931)
- Piaggio P.12 (twin-engine four-seat touring monoplane; licensed copy of the Blackburn Segrave) (1932)
- Piaggio P.16 (three-engine heavy bomber) (1934)
- Piaggio FN.305A two-seat training variant of the Nardi FN.305 fighter (1935)
- Piaggio P.23M (four-engine commercial transport prototype) (1935)
- Piaggio P.23R (three-engine commercial transport prototype) (1936)
- Piaggio P.32 (twin-engine bomber) (1936)
- Piaggio P.50 (four-engine heavy bomber) (1937)
- Piaggio P.108 (four-engine heavy bomber) (1939)
- Piaggio P.111 (high-altitude research aircraft) (1941)
- Piaggio P.119 (single-engine single-seat fighter) (1942)
- Piaggio P.127C (four-engine commercial transport proposal)
- Piaggio P.136 (amphibian flying boat) (1948)
- Piaggio P.148 (two-seat primary/aerobatic trainer) (1951)
- Piaggio P.149 (four/five-seat utility/liaison or two-seat trainer, also known as Focke-Wulf FWP-149D) (1953)
- Piaggio P.150 (two-seat trainer) (1952)
- Piaggio P.166 (utility light transport) (1957)
- Piaggio PD-808 (twin-jet light utility transport) (1964)
- Piaggio P.180 Avanti: business aircraft (1986)
- Avanti II: business aircraft (2005)
- Avanti EVO: business aircraft (2014)
- Piaggio P.180 Avanti NX: P.180 Avanti NX (2026)

=== Unmanned Aerial Vehicle (UAV) ===
- Baykar Bayraktar Akıncı
- Baykar Bayraktar TB2
- Piaggio P.1HH HammerHead (prototype) (2013)
- Piaggio P.2HH HammerHead (prototype) (2018)

=== Aircraft Engines ===
- Piaggio P.II
- Piaggio P.VI
- Piaggio P.VII
- Piaggio P.VIII
- Piaggio P.IX
- Piaggio P.X
- Piaggio P.XI
- Piaggio P.XII
- Piaggio P.XV
- Piaggio P.XIX
- Piaggio P.XXII
