= Piaggio P.7 =

Piaggio P.7 Piaggio-Pegna P.c.7
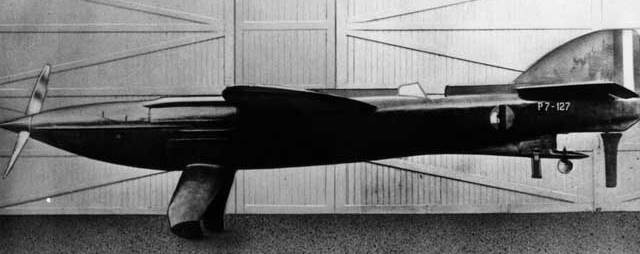

General information
- Type: Racing seaplane
- National origin: Italy
- Manufacturer: Piaggio
- Designer: Ing Giovanni Pegna
- Number built: 1

History
- First flight: None (water trials conducted in 1929)

The Piaggio P.7, also known as the Piaggio-Pegna P.c.7, was an Italian racing seaplane designed and built by Piaggio for the 1929 Schneider Trophy race.

== Design and development ==
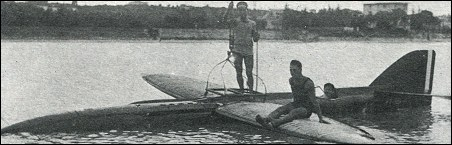
The P.7 afloat. When at rest, the aircraft floated up to its wings on its watertight fuselage with its hydroplanes submerged beneath it and its wings resting on the water.

Seeking to avoid the aerodynamic drag induced by floats in seaplanes of floatplane design, Ing Giovanni Pegna of the Piaggio company designed a very unusual seaplane to represent Italy in the 1929 Schneider Trophy race. A cantilever shoulder-wing monoplane, known both as the Piaggio P.7 and the Piaggio-Pegna P.c.7, his design floated up to its wings on its long, slender, watertight fuselage with the wings resting on the water, and employed twin high-incidence hydrofoils to get itself off the water during takeoff runs.

Sources differ on the P.7's engine; it is described both as an Isotta Fraschini Special V6 rated at 723 kW (983 PS; 970 hp) and as an Isotta Fraschini AS-5 of 745 kW (1,013 PS; 999 hp). The engine was connected both to a two-bladed automatic variable-pitch tractor propeller by a long metal shaft and by another shaft to a smaller marine propeller, similar to those used on motorboats, mounted beneath the aircraft's tail. To take off, the pilot would start the engine with the flight propeller feathered and the normal carburettor air intake closed and use a clutch to engage the tail propeller and get the aircraft moving through the water. The two hydrofoils, mounted beneath the fuselage on struts just forward of the wings similar to the way in which floats were mounted on floatplanes, would cause the P.7 to rise out of the water almost immediately. After the aircraft had risen on its hydrofoils and the flight propeller had cleared the water, the pilot would open the carburettor air intake, again employing the clutch to disengage the marine propeller, and use another clutch to engage the flight propeller, which automatically would switch from feathered to flight pitch. Driven by its flight propeller, the aircraft then would engage in a conventional takeoff, riding on its submerged hydrofoils until it reached takeoff speed.

Without the aerodynamic drag induced by floats or the weight they added to the aircraft, Pegna projected that the P.7 would reach high speeds. Sources differ on the speeds he predicted, claiming both 580 km/h (360 mph) and 700 km/h (434.7 mph).

== Testing ==
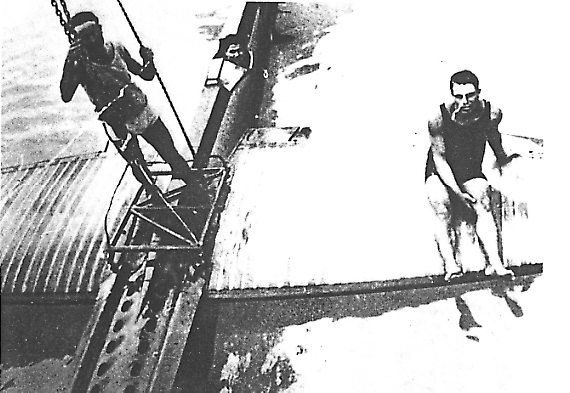
The P.7 as it appeared from above while afloat.

Piaggio manufactured one P.7 and turned it over to the Italian Schneider Trophy racing team. Although some pilots refused to fly the aircraft, the Italian Schneider team's Tommaso Dal Molin conducted some water tests on Lake Garda in northern Italy. The spray the hydroplanes generated made seeing during takeoff difficult, and persistent problems with both clutches ensued. The aircraft never became airborne.

Not ready in time, the P.7 was excluded from the 1929 Schneider Trophy race, in which a Macchi M.52R and two Macchi M.67 seaplanes represented Italy. Piaggio and Pegna abandoned plans to build a second P.7.

== Operators ==
Kingdom of Italy

== Specifications ==

Data from Italian Civil and Military aircraft 1930-1945.

General characteristics

- Crew: one
- Length: 8.86 m (29 ft 0.75 in)
- Wingspan: 6.76 m (22 ft 2 in)
- Height: 2.451 m (8 ft 0.5 in)
- Wing area: 9.83 m^{2} (105.8 sq ft)
- Empty weight: 1,403 kg (3,093 lb)
- Gross weight: 1,682 kg (3,709 lb)
- Powerplant: 1 × Isotta Fraschini V-12 liquid-cooled piston engine, 630 kW (850 hp)
- Sources differ, claiming both that the P.7's engine was an Isotta Fraschini Special V6 rated at 723 kW (970 hp) and an Isotta Fraschini AS-5 rated at 745 kW (999 hp)

Performance

- Maximum speed: 600 km/h (373 mph, 324 kn) Sources differ on the P.7's projected maximum speed, claiming both 580 km/h (360 mph) and 700 km/h (434.7 mph).

== See also ==
Related lists

- List of flying boats and floatplanes
