= Piaggio P1XX =

P1XX

General information
- Type: Executive transport
- Manufacturer: Piaggio Aero
- Status: In development

The Piaggio P1XX is a proposed twin-jet aircraft being developed by Piaggio Aero. Piaggio has assured potential buyers that the design is not merely a "re-engine" of the P180 Avanti. A dedicated team is working on the design. In August 2010, Piaggio announced that the jet would not be formally launched in 2010, due to weak market conditions.

Piaggio has been in negotiations with at least one engine supplier, but none has yet been named.
