= Piaggio P.111 =

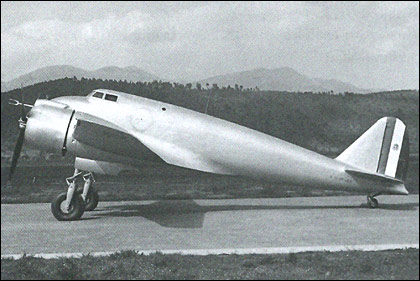

General information
- Type: High-altitude research aircraft
- National origin: Italy
- Manufacturer: Piaggio
- Primary user: Regia Aeronautica (Italian Royal Air Force)
- Number built: 1

History
- Introduction date: 1941
- First flight: 9 April 1941
- Retired: Early 1943

The Piaggio P.111 was an Italian high-altitude research aircraft designed and built by Piaggio for the Regia Aeronautica (Italian Royal Air Force).

== Design and development ==
The genesis of the P.111 was in 1938, when the Regia Aeronautica awarded a contract to Piaggio to construct the prototype of a three-seat, twin-engine, high-speed, high-altitude bomber with a pressurized cabin. Piaggio constructed a new radial engine especially for the P.111, the 745 kW (999 hp) 18-cylinder double-row air-cooled Piaggio P.XII R.C.100/2v, which was fitted with a two-stage supercharger.

While the P.111 prototype was under construction, the Regia Aeronatica decided to use it as a high-altitude research aircraft rather than a bomber prototype.

=== Operational history ===
The P.111 first flew on 9 April 1941. Employed in research related to pressurization of the cabin of the Piaggio P.108 heavy bomber, it made 110 test and research flights before being retired and scrapped early in 1943.

== Operators ==
Kingdom of Italy

- Regia Aeronautica

== Specifications ==
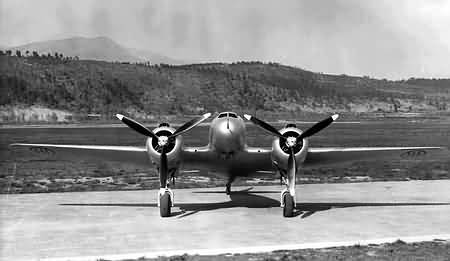
A Piaggio company photograph of the P.111 at Villanova d'Albenga, Savona, Italy, in 1941

Data from Italian Civil & Military Aircraft 1930–1945

General characteristics

- Crew: three
- Length: 12.4 m (40 ft 8.125 in)
- Wingspan: 17.30 m (56 ft 9 in)
- Height: 3.91 m (12 ft 10 in)
- Wing area: 40 m^{2} (430 sq ft)
- Empty weight: 5,239 kg (11,550 lb)
- Gross weight: 7,574 kg (16,698 lb)
- Max takeoff weight: 7,590 kg (16,733 lb)
- Powerplant: 2 × Piaggio P.XII R.C.100/2v 18-cylinder air-cooled radial piston engines, 750 kW (1,000 hp) each

Performance

- Maximum speed: 575 km/h (357 mph, 310 kn) at 10,000 m (33,000 ft)
- Cruise speed: 449 km/h (279 mph, 242 kn)
- Range: 1,659 km (1,031 mi, 896 nmi)
- Service ceiling: 12,000 m (39,400 ft)

== See also ==
Related lists

- List of aircraft of World War II
