= 16P =

16P may refer to:

- 16P/Brooks, a comet
- SpaceShipOne flight 16P, a commercial spaceflight

== See also ==
- P16 (disambiguation)
