= Vicenza Airport =

Vicenza “Tommaso Dal Molin” Airport Aeroporto di Vicenza “Tommaso Dal Molin”
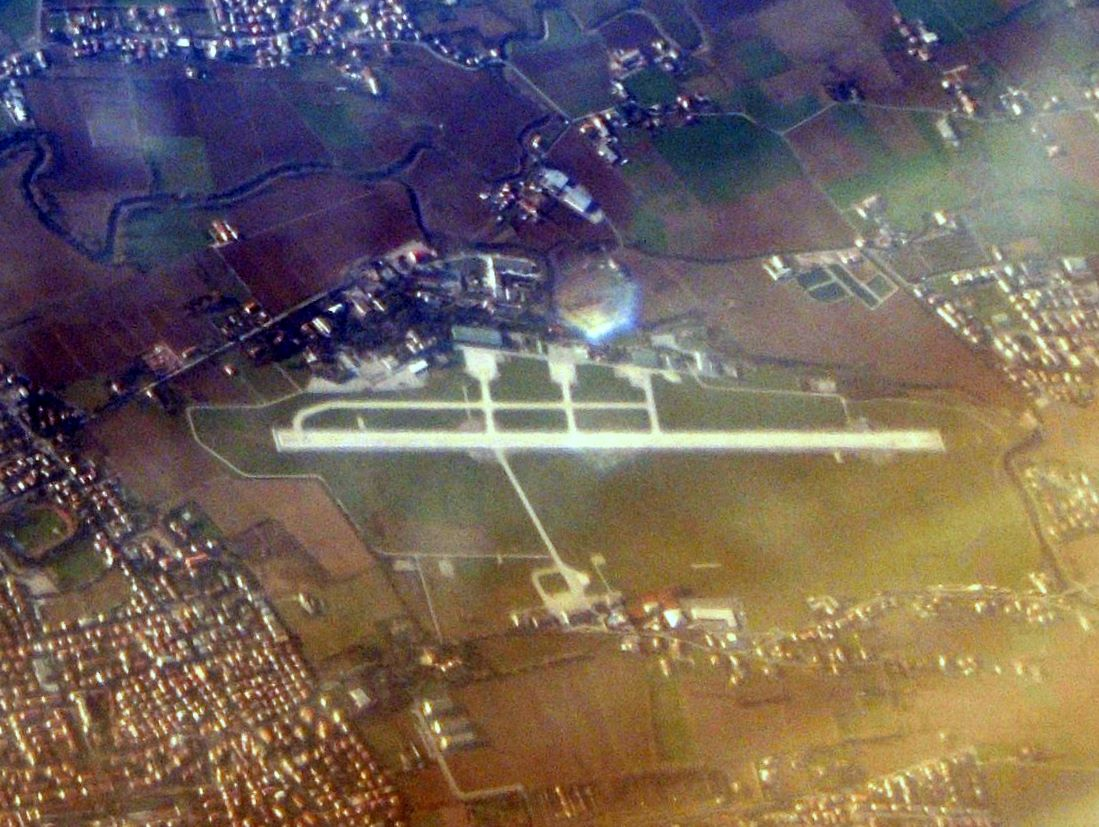
- An aerial view of Vicenza Airport in 2006.
- IATA: VIC; ICAO: LIPT

Summary
- Airport type: Military/Public
- Serves: Vicenza
- Built: 1921
- In use: 1921–2008
- Elevation AMSL: 128 ft / 39 m
- Coordinates: 45°34′24″N 011°31′47″E

Map
- Location of the airport in Italy

Runways
Direction	Length		Surface
Direction	ft	m	Surface
18/36	4,921	1,500	Asphalt
- Sources: World Aero Data

Vicenza Airport, officially Vicenza “Tommaso Dal Molin” Airport (Italian: Aeroporto di Vicenza “Tommaso Dal Molin”; IATA: VIC, ICAO: LIPT), was an airport serving Vicenza, Province of Vicenza, Veneto, Italy. It was one of three airports in the Province of Vicenza, along with Asiago Airport and Thiene Airport. Classified as a city airport because it was only 3 kilometres (1.86 mi) northwest of the city center, it remained in operation from 1921 until 2008, when it was closed to all air traffic for the construction of a base for the United States military, the second such base in the Vicenza area. The runway was demolished in 2009, and as of 2016 a public park is being designed for the former airport grounds. The new U.S. Army Caserma Del Din ("Del Din Barracks") opened on part of the former airport's grounds in 2013.

== History ==
=== Construction ===
Vicenza Airport was constructed in 1921 under the sponsorship of the Province of Vicenza and the comune (municipality) of Vicenza on what had been the city's parade ground during World War I to give the area's newly established aeroclub a place from which to operate. As originally built, the airport had a 500-metre (1,640 ft) grass runway.

=== Military airbase ===
The Regia Aeronautica (Italian Royal Air Force) subsequently acquired the airport for military use and made it the base of the 16th Stormo Bombardamento Terrestre ("Terrestrial Bombardment Wing"). The Regia Aeronautica upgraded the airport by building hangars, a control tower, a headquarters building, and other structures and by extending the runway to 1,000 metres (3,281 ft) in length and paving it with macadam. As the upgrade was completed, a runway night lighting system was installed, making it both the first airport in Italy equipped with runway lighting and the first in Italy capable of carrying out night flights. When the enhancements were finished, the then-Minister of Air Force Italo Balbo officially opened the airbase. The Regia Aeronautica named it for Tommaso Dal Molin, a prominent Regia Aeronautica aerobatic and racing pilot of the 1920s, after he died in a floatplane crash in Lake Garda in January 1930.

=== World War II ===
During World War II, the 15th Stormo ("Wing") was based at Vicenza from 2 March 1941 to the end of August 1942 and the 16th Stormo Bombardamento Terrestre, equipped with the CANT Z.1007 medium bomber, also operated from the base. After Italy surrendered to the Allies on 8 September 1943 and Italy switched to the Allied side, the airbase came under the control of Benito Mussolini′s Italian Social Republic, which continued to fight on the side of the Axis, and a squadron of the Italian 3rd Fighter Group "Francesco Baracca" and a series of German Luftwaffe squadrons were transferred to it. In 1943, the Luftwaffe extended the runway to its final length of 1,500 metres (4,921 ft) and also built an impressive aircraft dispersal area in the surrounding countryside, where planes were hidden and protected from Allied bombing. The dispersal area lay east of the airbase, extended as far as the hamlet of Saviabona, and was made up of dirt tracks. For a short period, the Italian flying ace Adriano Visconti — who flew with the Regia Aeronautica and later with the Italian Social Republic's Aeronautica Nazionale Repubblicana ("National Republican Air Force") — was based at Vicenza.

=== Post-World War II ===
After World War II, plans called for the airbase to become the "Airport of Veneto," accommodating civilian flights alongside military aircraft, but political immobility and the presence of air force personnel slowed down the project, and eventually Verona Villafranca Airport was chosen to serve as Veneto's main airport. In 1947 the airbase suspended its civilian operations after the last Avio Linee Italiane flight to Rome took off. The suspension lasted for 50 years.

During the Cold War, the base served as the headquarters of the Italian Air Force′s Comando Operativo delle Forze Aeree (COFA, in English "Air Force Operational Command"), and the 5th Allied Tactical Air Force (ATAF). During the Yugoslav Wars of the 1990s, the 5th ATAF directed air operations that took place in the conflicts.

In 2004, the 5th ATAF and the COFA moved from Vicenza to Poggio Renatico. This left the airbase housing only the Vicenza Airbase Command, supported by the technical services, logistical, and security services provided by the Vigilanza Militare Aeronautica; the 27th Engineer Field Department; the 10th Helicopter Maintenance Group; and a pair of Eurofighter Typhoons crewed by personnel of the Experimental Flight Department and used to test the Typhoon's capabilities, with an emphasis on its short-takeoff-or-landing (STOL) capabilities.

=== Civilian airport ===
Between the mid-1990s and the 2000s, an attempt was made to relaunch civilian activity from Vicenza with flights to Rome Fiumicino, Munich, Olbia, and Forlì, but the airport's limited operational capabilities, such as a lack of equipment for night flights, hampered the efforts. At the end of 2006, equipment for night flights was installed at the airport and its runway, but regular civilian flights did not resume. As of the beginning of 2007 the airport was open to traffic from 07:00 to 20:00 Central European Time and could be extended beyond those times on request with 24 hours notice. Instrument Flight Rules (IFR) approach equipment, customs, and security procedures were operational whenever the airport was open, including during extensions.

=== The U.S. base ===
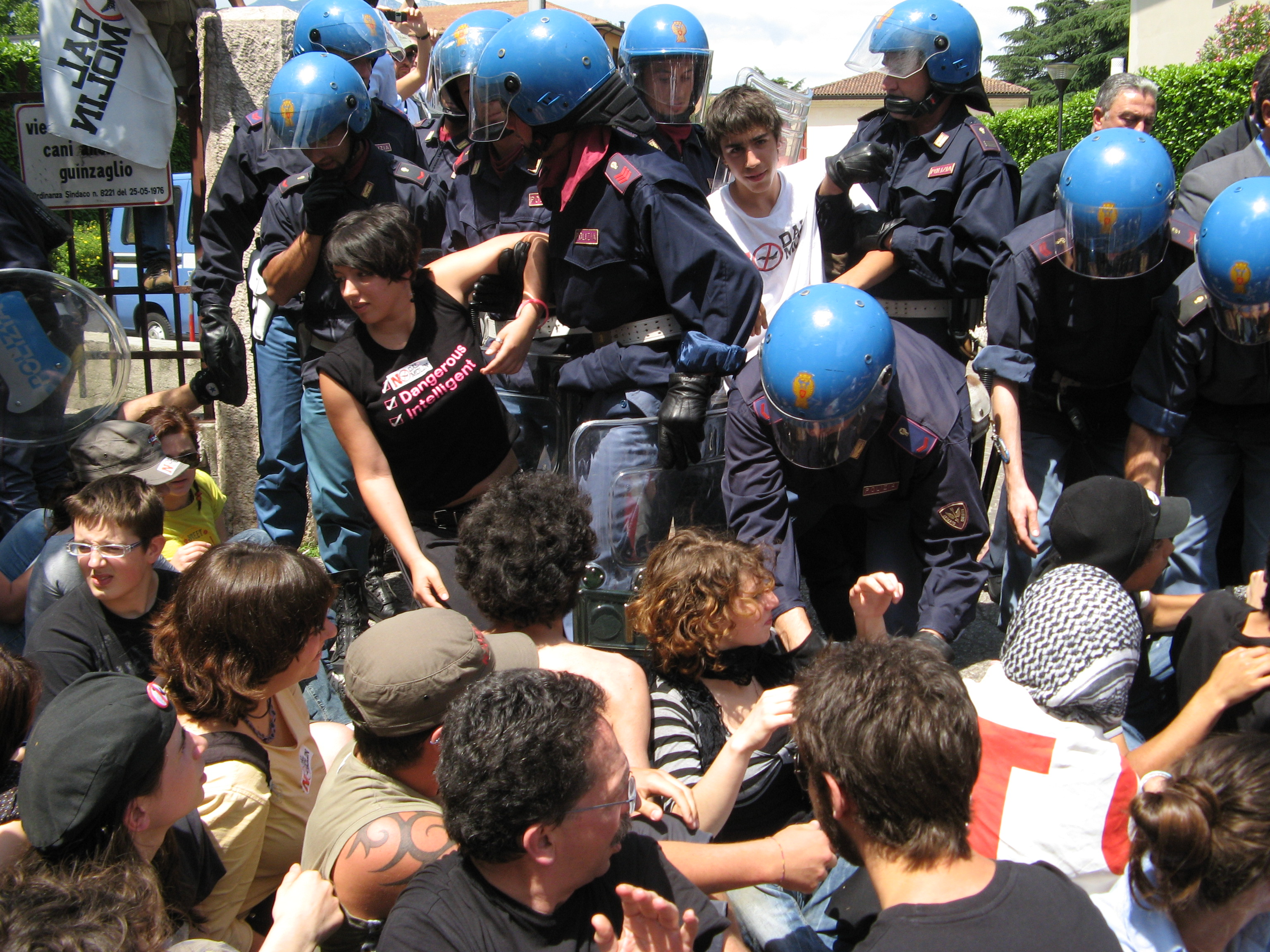
Police moving demonstrators protesting in support of the "No Dal Molin" movement who are blocking the exit of Prime Minister of Italy Romano Prodi's car from the S. Chiara Auditorium in Trento, Italy, during the 2007 Economy Festival.

At the time, a great debate was underway in Vicenza over plans to sell the airport grounds to the United States Army, which planned to reunify its 173rd Airborne Brigade by moving the brigade′s four battalions stationed in Germany to a new base on the airport's property, joining the brigade's other two battalions there. The U.S. Army presented the proposal as an "extension" of the existing Caserma Ederle ("Ederle Barracks"), even though the two sites are 6 kilometres (3.7 mi) apart and on opposite sides of the city. An activist group in Vicenza, "No Dal Molin," organized demonstrations against the proposed base on a national scale in Italy. The municipal and provincial councils supported the sale, however, and on 16 January 2007 the Government of Italy announced its approval of the construction of the new U.S. base at an estimated cost of approximately 325 million euros. On 1 March 2008, the last Italian military personnel — Italian Air Force personnel who managed the control tower — were transferred and the airport became civilian for all purposes. On 10 April 2008, the airport officially was removed from navigation charts and IFR instrument approach procedures were discontinued.

Meanwhile, the new mayor of Vicenza, Achille Variati, and his newly elected municipal administration expressed their opposition to the construction of the U.S. military base. As a result, a notice to airmen (NOTAM) issued on 12 June 2008 officially reopened the airport. For a few months, the BIGA service guaranteed air traffic control operations at the airport from 07:00 to 19:00 Central European Time. On 1 October 2008, however, the airport closed to all air traffic permanently due to the construction of the new American military base on the west side of the airport's grounds. Demolition of the runway began on 3 February 2009 and was completed the same year.

The recently elected mayor, Achille Variati, proposed to the Vicenza city council that new plans be made for the former airport site and promoted the idea of a popular referendum to give the city's voters, some of whom continued to oppose the U.S. base, a voice in the airport property's future. However, the Council of State accepted an appeal by the Presidency of the Council of Ministers and the Ministry of Defense against the Regional Administrative Court of Veneto's order to hold the referendum, declared the approval of the military installation a "political act, as such unquestionable by the administrative judge," and blocked the referendum four days before it was to take place.

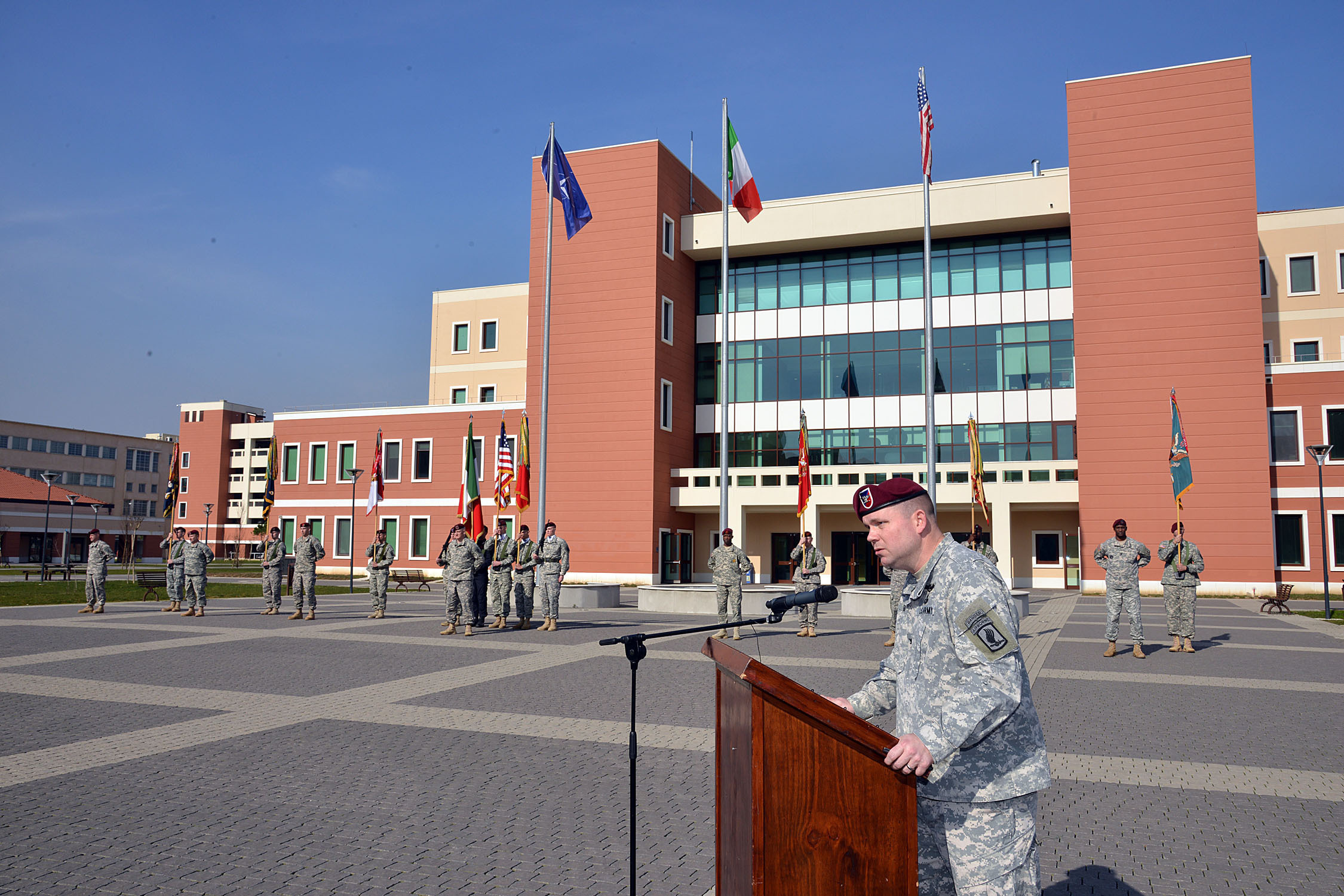
Colonel Michael Foster, commanding officer of the United States Army′s 173rd Airborne Brigade, delivers remarks during a ceremony transferring Caserma Del Din from Italian to U.S. Army control on 25 February 2014.

In November 2009, the Italian Civil Aviation Authority (ENAC) sent a letter to the Aeroporti Vicentini SpA ("Vicenza Airports SpA") company and to the municipality of Vicenza in which it reiterated the historical use of the airport's grounds as an airbase and airport and reported that the Interministerial Committee for Economic Planning had allocated 11.5 million euros for the reconstruction of the airport runway on behalf of ENAC. But in January 2010, liquidation of the company that managed the airport was concluded, and in December 2011 the municipality of Vicenza obtained a concession on the former airport grounds, with the intention to close all aviation-related facilities and build in their place a large public park to be named Parco della Pace ("Peace Park"). As of 2016, construction of the park was in its design phase, and the Ugo Capitanio aeroclub, which had been in operation since 1921, a flight school, the Vicenza aeronautical workshops, and an aviation museum all remained active at the former airport pending its final closure to make room for the new park.

The new U.S. Army base, dubbed Caserma Del Din ("Del Din Barracks"), opened in 2013 and has become the headquarters of the 173rd Airborne Brigade.

== Transportation links ==
=== VoliRegionali S.p.A. ===
VoliRegionali S.p.A. ("Regional Flights" SpA) was an airline based at Vicenza Airport.

After a first short test flight on 23 July 2004 — in which a Fokker 50 operated by Denim Airways (later Denim Air) carrying a group of entrepreneurs and politicians from Vicenza took off from Vicenza Airport, flew over the Venetian Lagoon, and then returned to Vicenza — VoliRegionali was founded in August 2004. The initial corporate base of the new airline consisted of "Regional Founders," who owned 50% of the company, and "Friends of the Airport," who owned the other 50%. Matteo Salin was appointed the airline's first president and Paolo Sommariva was its chief executive officer.

VoliRegionali planned to launch flights connecting Vicenza Airport to many important Italian and European cities, an initiative overseen by a new board of directors, among whom Dr. Manfredo De Paolis, a professional appointed in 2004, was tasked with presenting the industrial plan to relaunch the Vicenza Airport. Plans called for VoliRegionali to provide connections from Vicenza Airport to Rome Ciampino, with daily flights beginning on 1 June 2005; to Olbia, as a summer route to be flown on Saturdays and Sundays; and to Forlì and Munich.

VoliRegionali began service on 30 May 2005 with a demonstration flight to Olbia, Forlì, and Munich, using an ATR 42 chartered from Airlinair. The airline began regular scheduled passenger service on 1 June 2005, using a 30-seat Embraer 120 (registered as F-GFEO) leased from the French Octavia Airlines (which later became O-Air) and painted in Voliregionali's livery. It also operated a Beechcraft 1900D chartered from Octavia Airlines for two days, on 3 and 4 July 2005.

After operating F-GFEO throughout August 2005, VolirRegionali switched from the end of August through 18 September 2005 to another Embraer 120 (registered as F-GTSH), leased from the French Atlas Atlantique Airlines, which later was acquired by O-Air; this aircraft remained in its original livery. From 25 September to December 2005, VoliRegionali operated a Fokker 50 (registered as PH-LMT) leased from Denim Airways; it flew in its original livery at first, but operated in VoliRegionali's livery beginning on 15 October 2005.

VoliRegionali arranged for a free transfer for its passengers from Rome Ciampino Airport to Rome's Roma Termini railway station in collaboration with Terravision.

In October 2005, De Paolis concluded an agreement with Alitalia, but the agreement never went into effect because of the restrictions on Vincenza Airport's operating hours imposed by the Italian Air Force, which already had made what at the time still were secret agreements with the United States Government to sell the airport grounds.

On 23 December 2005, VoliRegionali ceased flight activities. In June 2006, it asked Aeroporti Vicentini SpA for compensation for breach of contract.

=== Surface transportation ===
Vicenza Airport could be reached easily from the center of the municipality of Vicenza by car, by bicycle, and by the No. 9 bus line operated by La Società Vicentina Trasporti (SVT), the public transport company in Vicenza.

== See also ==
- List of airports in Italy
