= GVV Dal Molin MD.1 Anfibio Varese =

MD.1 Anfibio Varese

General information
- Type: Amphibian flying boat glider
- National origin: Italy
- Manufacturer: Grupo Volo a Vela Tommaso Dal Molin
- Designer: Angelo Mori
- Number built: 8

History
- First flight: 1933

The GVV Dal Molin MD.1 Anfibio Varese, (GVV - Grupo Volo a Vela - gliding group), was a single-seat, amphibious flying boat glider built in Italy in 1933. Eight were constructed.

== Development ==
The Anfibio Verese was designed by Angelo Mori and built by the Tommaso Dal Molin Gliding Group in the grounds of a primary school in Varese. It was a high-wing monoplane, its two spar wing supported centrally on a fuselage pedestal and braced on each side with a faired V-strut from the spars near mid-span to the lower fuselage. It was mounted with some dihedral and in plan was rectangular with blunt tips.

The Anfibio Varese had a caulked plywood covered, hexagonal section fuselage with an open cockpit immediately ahead of the wing pedestal. The fuselage tapered slightly rearwards to the tail, where the rectangular tailplane was mounted on top, supported by a single small strut on each side, and carried constant chord elevators. The fin was small but the balanced rudder was tall and somewhat pointed; it extended down to the keel and moved in an elevator cut-out. The fuselage underside was formed into a single step hull, though there was also a standard glider skid, running from just aft of the nose via the step to aft of mid-chord, assisted by a very small tail skid for land operations.

Its first flight was in 1933. On 16 September 1934 eight Anfibio Vareses and one other amphibious glider were bungee-launched from the summit of the Campo dei Fiori di Varese, alighting on Lake Schiranna near Varese.

== Specifications ==
Data from Pedrielli (2011) p.189

General characteristics

- Capacity: One
- Length: 6 m (19 ft 8 in)
- Wingspan: 10.9 m (35 ft 9 in)
- Wing area: 17.4 m^{2} (187 sq ft)
- Aspect ratio: 7
- Empty weight: 120 kg (265 lb)
- Gross weight: 195 kg (430 lb)

Performance

- Maximum glide ratio: estimated 11:1
- Wing loading: 11.20 kg/m^{2} (2.29 lb/sq ft)
