= Blackburn Lincock =

F.2 Lincock
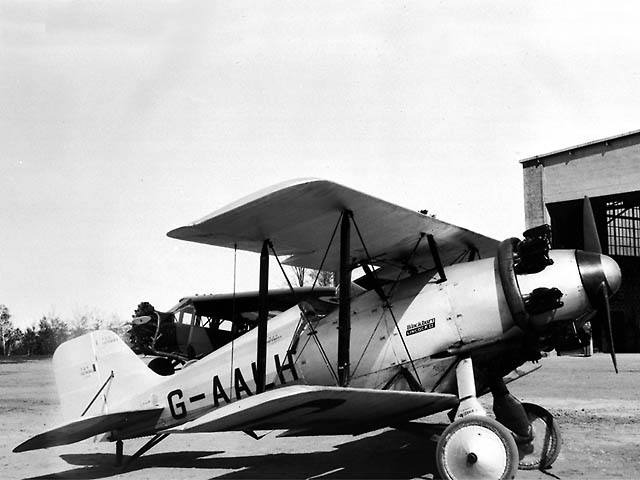
- Blackburn Lincock II

General information
- Type: Single-seat lightweight fighter
- Manufacturer: Blackburn Aircraft Limited
- Number built: 7

History
- First flight: 1928

The Blackburn F.2 Lincock was a British single-seat lightweight fighter produced by Blackburn Aircraft Limited.

== Design and development ==
In 1928 Blackburn designed and built a private venture lightweight biplane fighter powered by an Armstrong Siddeley Lynx IVC engine. The Blackburn F.2 Lincock was of wooden construction and first appeared in May 1928. It performed well in demonstrations but failed to gain any orders. The Canadian government showed an interest in the design, and a metal construction variant (the Lincock II) was built. It was tested in Canada at Camp Borden in 1930 where there was interest in using the Lincock as an advanced trainer, but the type was not ordered. It was later used to perform public aerobatic displays in 1933 and 1934.

The final version was the Lincock III of which five were produced, two were delivered to China, two to Japan and one retained as a demonstrator. Interest from Italy resulted in Piaggio acquiring a licence to produce a two-seat version as an aerobatic trainer, though only one Piaggio P.11 was built.

== Variants ==
Lincock I
Wooden-construction prototype, one built.
Lincock II
Metal-construction prototype, one built.
Lincock III
Production version, five built.
Piaggio P.11
two-seat aerobatic trainer, one built in Italy.

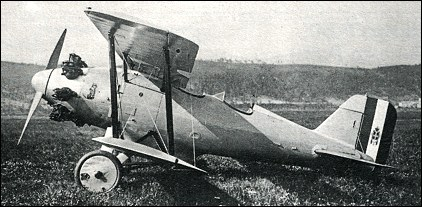
Piaggio P.11

== Operators ==
(Taiwan) Republic of China

- Chinese Nationalist Air Force received two aircraft.

Empire of Japan

- Imperial Japanese Army Air Force received two aircraft.

== Specifications (Lincock III) ==
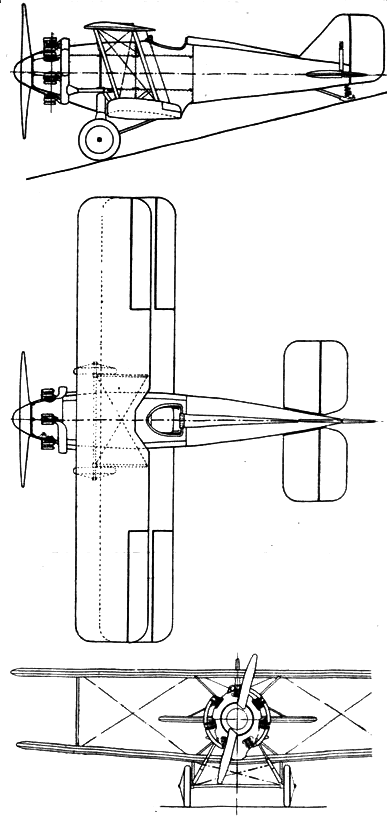
Blackburn Lincock 3-view drawing from l'Aerophile April 1931

Data from Blackburn Aircraft since 1909

General characteristics

- Crew: 1
- Length: 19 ft 6 in (5.94 m)
- Wingspan: 22 ft 6 in (6.86 m)
- Height: 7 ft 4 in (2.24 m)
- Wing area: 170 sq ft (16 m^{2})
- Empty weight: 1,326 lb (601 kg)
- Max takeoff weight: 2,082 lb (944 kg)
- Powerplant: 1 × Armstrong Siddeley Lynx Major 7-cylinder air-cooled radial pistone engine, 270 hp (200 kW)
- Propellers: 2-bladed fixed-pitch propeller

Performance

- Maximum speed: 164 mph (264 km/h, 143 kn) at sea level
- Range: 380 mi (610 km, 330 nmi)
- Service ceiling: 23,000 ft (7,000 m)
- Rate of climb: 1,660 ft/min (8.4 m/s)

Armament

- Guns: 2 × forward-firing .303 in (7.7 mm) Vickers machine guns.
