= Stadio Tommaso Dal Molin =

Stadium in Arzignano, Italy

Coordinates: 45°31′09″N 11°19′27″E

Stadio Dal Molin
- Interactive map of Stadio Dal Molin
- Location: Arzignano, Italy
- Capacity: 2,000
- Surface: Grass

Tenant
- A.S.D. Union ArzignanoChiampo

Tommaso Dal Molin Stadium (Italian: Stadio Tommaso Dal Molin) is a stadium located in Arzignano, Italy.

The stadium is named for Tommaso Dal Molin, a prominent Regia Aeronautica (Italian Royal Air Force) aerobatic and racing pilot of the 1920s who died in a floatplane crash in Lake Garda in January 1930.
