= Piaggio P.23R =

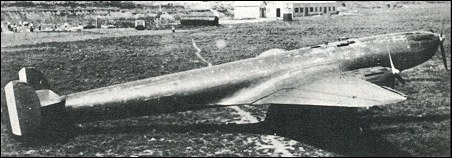

General information
- Type: Commercial transport aircraft prototype
- National origin: Italy
- Manufacturer: Piaggio
- Number built: 1

History
- First flight: 1936

The Piaggio P.23R, also known as the Piaggio P.123 for propaganda purposes, was an Italian commercial transport aircraft prototype designed and built by Piaggio.

== Design and development ==
Piaggio designed the P.23R specifically to break speed records for commercial transport aircraft. It was a three-engine low-wing cantilever monoplane with twin tail fins and rudders. The three 671-kilowatt (900-horsepower) Isotta Fraschini Asso ("Ace") XI R V-12 engines were mounted in aerodynamically clean, sleek cowlings and each drove a three-bladed propeller. The fuselage was pencil-shaped. The crew of two sat side by side in separate open cockpits, each protected by a windscreen.

The P.23R later was re-engined with three 746-kilowatt (1,001-horsepower) Piaggio P.XI RC.40 radial engines and its landing gear was modified. In addition, both cockpits were enclosed with canopies.

== Operational history ==
The P.23R first flew in 1936. On 30 December 1938, it carried a payload of 5000 kilograms (11,023 pounds) at an average speed of 404 kilometers per hour (250.8 miles per hour), setting new world records over both the 1,000-kilometer (621 mi) and 2,000-kilometer (1,243 mi) distances.

The P.23R's development was halted in 1939. During World War II, however, Allied aircraft recognition manuals erroneously identified it as a possible Regia Aeronautica (Italian Royal Air Force) bomber.

== Variants ==
Although confusingly numbered as if it were a variant of the Piaggio P.23 commercial transport prototype of 1935, the P.23R was in fact an entirely new design.

== Operators ==
Kingdom of Italy

== Specifications (P.23R - Piaggio engines) ==
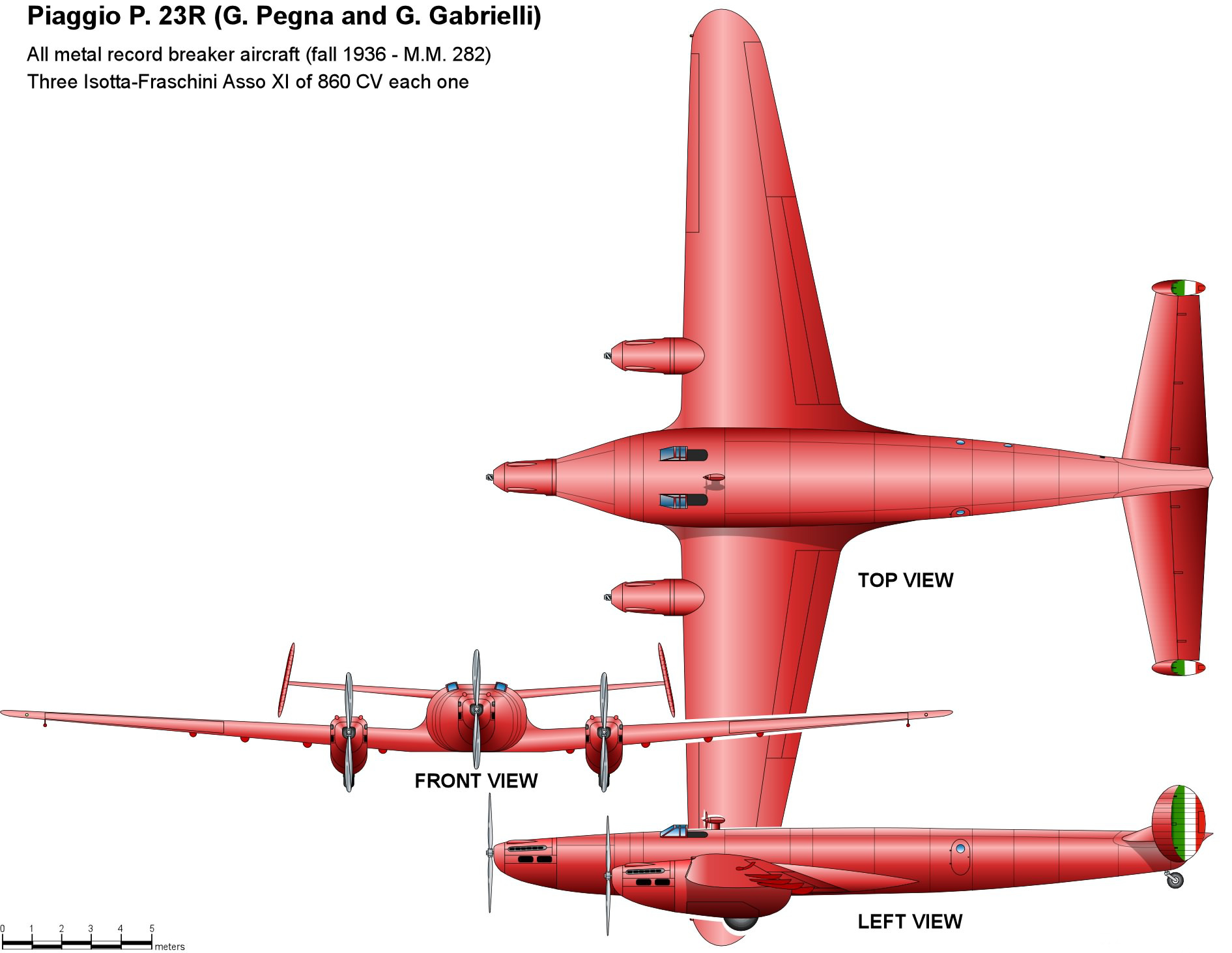
Piaggio P 23R early version

Data from Italian Civil and Military aircraft 1930-1945

General characteristics

- Crew: 4
- Length: 23.74 m (77 ft 10.75 in)
- Wingspan: 29.41 m (96 ft 6 in)
- Height: 4.93 m (16 ft 2 in)
- Wing area: 91.27 m^{2} (982.4 sq ft)
- Empty weight: 11,979 kg (26,410 lb)
- Gross weight: 18,986 kg (41,857 lb)
- Powerplant: 3 × Piaggio P.XI R.C.40 14-cyl two-row air-cooled radial piston engines, 750 kW (1,000 hp) each

Performance

- Maximum speed: 439 km/h (273 mph, 237 kn)
- Cruise speed: 349 km/h (217 mph, 189 kn)
- Stall speed: 150 km/h (93 mph, 81 kn)
- Range: 3,800 km (2,360 mi, 2,050 nmi)
- Service ceiling: 7,276 m (23,871 ft)
