= Piaggio P.16 =

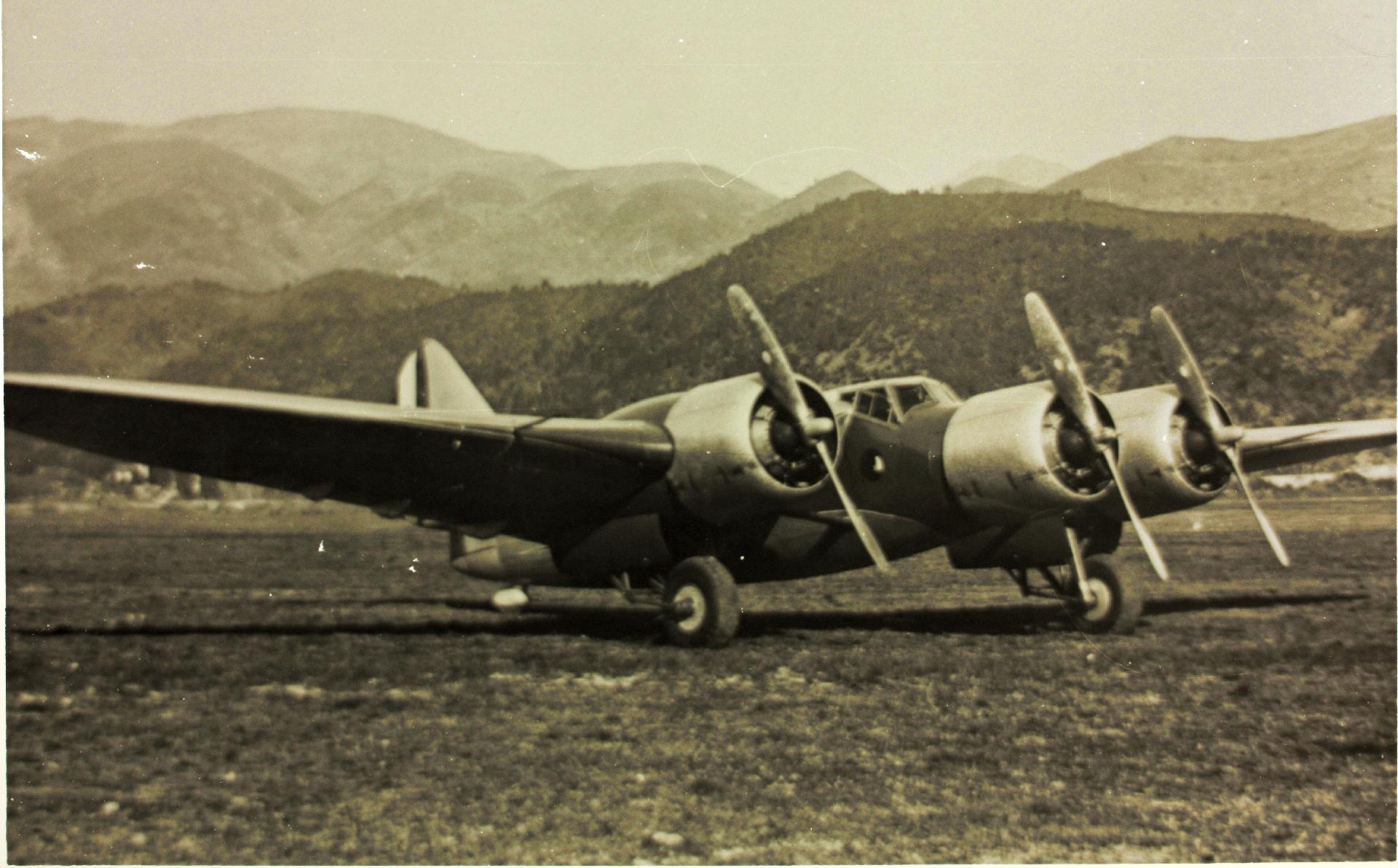

General information
- Type: Heavy bomber
- National origin: Italy
- Manufacturer: Piaggio
- Status: Canceled
- Primary user: Regia Aeronautica
- Number built: 1

History
- First flight: 1934

The Piaggio P.16 was an Italian heavy bomber designed and built by Piaggio for the Regia Aeronautica (Italian Royal Air Force).

== Design and development ==
The P.16 was a three-engine shoulder-wing monoplane of mostly metal construction, with inverted gull wings. Its wing was thick and semi-elliptical, and its tail was mounted high on the fuselage. It had retractable main landing gear and a spatted, non-retractable tailwheel. In addition to bombs, its armament consisted of four 7.62-millimeter (0.3-inch) machine guns, of which two were mounted in the leading edge of the wing, one in a retractable dorsal turret, and one in the rear of the fuselage beneath the tail. The bombardier (bomb-aimer) manned a compartment set behind the nose engine on the underside of the fuselage.

== Operational history ==
The P.16 first flew in November 1934, and an order for 12 aircraft was placed and then cancelled, with preference given to the Piaggio P.32, which was produced from 1936 to 1939.

== Operators ==
Kingdom of Italy

- Regia Aeronautica

== Specifications ==
Data from Italian Civil and Military aircraft 1930–1945

General characteristics

- Crew: 4
- Length: 13.35 m (43 ft 9.5 in)
- Wingspan: 22.00 m (72 ft 2 in)
- Height: 3.5 m (11 ft 5.75 in)
- Wing area: 69.97 m^{2} (753.2 sq ft)
- Gross weight: 8,432 kg (18,590 lb)
- Powerplant: 3 × Piaggio Stella P.IX R.C.40 9-cyl. air-cooled radial piston engine, 520 kW (700 hp) each

Performance

- Maximum speed: 400 km/h (248 mph, 216 kn) at 3,170 m (10,400 ft)
- Stall speed: 105 km/h (65 mph, 56 kn)
- Range: 2,000 km (1,242 mi, 1,079 nmi) with 1,000 kg (2,200 lb) of bombs, or 1,500 km (930 mi) with 500 kg (1,100 lb) of bombs
- Time to altitude: 6,000 m (20,000 ft) in 17 minutes

Armament

- Guns:
- 2 x fixed 7.62 mm (0.300 in) Breda-SAFAT machine guns in wing leading edge
- 1 x flexible7.62 mm (0.300 in) machine gun in dorsal turret
- 1 x flexible 7.62 mm (0.300 in) machine gun in rear underside of fuselage
- Bombs: 1,000 kg (2,205 lb)
