= Piaggio P.23M =

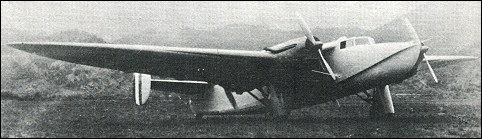

General information
- Type: Commercial transport aircraft prototype
- National origin: Italy
- Manufacturer: Piaggio
- Number built: 1

History
- First flight: 1935

The Piaggio P.23M was an Italian commercial transport aircraft prototype designed and built by Piaggio.

== Design and development ==
Piaggio designed the P.23M specifically for flights across the North Atlantic Ocean, intending it to have potential for development as a commercial transport. It was a four-engine shoulder-wing monoplane with inverted gull wings and twin tail fins and rudders. To allow an easier landing if the aircraft had to ditch at sea, its fuselage was designed like a boat hull, which Piaggio termed an avion marin ("marine aviation") design, although the aircraft was not a flying boat. The main landing gear was retractable. The P.23M's four 671-kilowatt (900 hp) Isotta-Fraschini Asso XI R. V-12 engines were mounted on the wings in two tandem pairs, each engine driving a two-bladed propeller; two of the propellers were mounted in a pusher configuration and the other two in a tractor configuration.

Piaggio claimed a top speed of 400 kilometres per hour (249 mph; 216 kn) for the P.23M and projected its maximum range at a cruising speed of 300 kilometres per hour (186 mph; 162 kn) as 5,100 kilometres (3,169 mi; 2,754 nmi).

== Operational history ==
The P.23 first flew in 1935. No attempt to fly the Atlantic Ocean ever took place, and its predicted maximum range capabilities never were tested. The aircraft soon was disassembled and never flew again.

== Variants ==
No variants of the P.23 were produced. The Piaggio P.23R of 1936, although also a commercial transport prototype and confusingly numbered as if it were a variant of the P.23, was an entirely new design.

== Operators ==
- Kingdom of Italy

== Specifications (P.23M) ==
Data from Italian Civil and Military aircraft 1930-1945

General characteristics

- Crew: 4
- Length: 16.6 m (54 ft 5.375 in)
- Wingspan: 27 m (88 ft 6.75 in)
- Wing area: 97.46 m^{2} (1,049.1 sq ft)
- Empty weight: 7,371 kg (16,251 lb)
- Gross weight: 18,400 kg (40,566 lb)
- Powerplant: 4 × Isotta-Fraschini Asso XI R. V-12 liquid-cooled piston engines, 670 kW (900 hp) each

Performance

- Maximum speed: 400 km/h (248 mph, 216 kn)
- Cruise speed: 300 km/h (186 mph, 162 kn)
- Range: 5,097 km (3,167 mi, 2,752 nmi) at 300 km/h (190 mph)
- Time to altitude: 4,000 m (13,000 ft) in 14 minutes
