= Tommaso Dal Molin =

Italian aviator (1902–1930)

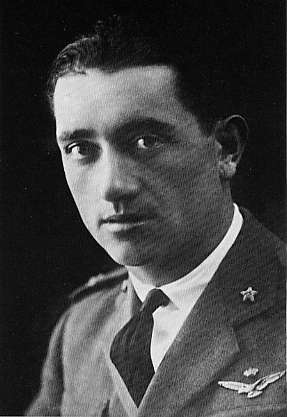
- Born: 3 January 1902; Altissimo, Italy
- Died: 18 January 1930 (aged 28); Lake Garda, Italy
- Occupation(s): Fighter pilot Air racer Aerobatic pilot

Tommaso Dal Molin (3 January 1902 – 18 January 1930) was an Italian fighter pilot and internationally prominent seaplane air racer and aerobatic pilot of the 1920s.

== Biography ==
Dal Molin was born on 3 January 1902, in Molino di Altissimo, a hamlet in the comune of Altissimo, in the Province of Vicenza in Veneto, Italy. A few years later, his family moved to a home on the Via Bonifacio Biolo in Chiampo.

After working at the Pellizzari Works in Arzignano, Dal Molin decided to join the Royal Italian Army′s Corpo Aeronautico Militare ("Military Aviation Corps") in 1922. He obtained a pilot's license on 13 October 1922. In 1923, the Corpo Aeronautico Militare became an independent branch of military service as the Regia Aeronautica (Italian Royal Air Force).

Dal Molin demonstrated superior ability and temperament while serving in various Regia Aeronautica fighter squadrons, both in training and as an aerobatic pilot. As a result, the Regia Aeronautica chose him to represent Italy in international aerobatic competitions, including international competitions at Zürich, Switzerland, where his performances stood out among those of his competitors. In May 1928, Dal Molin transferred to the Regia Aeronautica′s High Speed School at Desenzano del Garda, which was under the command of Lieutenant Colonel Mario Bernasconi, and began training to represent Italy in the Schneider Cup seaplane races. He conducted water tests of the Piaggio P.7 racing seaplane on Lake Garda prior to the 1929 Schneider Cup race, but it never became airborne and was not included in the race.

Dal Molin himself took part in the 1929 Schneider Cup race, held on 6 and 7 September 1929 and hosted by the United Kingdom on the air circuit at Calshot on the Isle of Man. The superiority of the two Supermarine S.6 racers the United Kingdom entered in the race was evident — one of them reached an unofficial single-lap world record speed of 332.49 miles per hour (535.09 km/h) before being disqualified — and Royal Air Force Flying Officer Richard Waghorn, flying an S.6, set an official world speed record of 331.17 miles per hour (532.97 km/h) during one lap of the race and finished far ahead of his competitors, averaging 329 miles per hour (529 km/h) over the course of the seven-lap race. Among Italy's three entrants, the two newest aircraft, both Macchi M.67 racers, failed to finish. Dal Molin, piloting the older Macchi M.52R floatplane, finished far behind Waghorn but nonetheless managed to take second place, and his average speed for the race, 284.20 miles per hour (457.38 km/h), was 2.71 miles per hour (4.36 km/h) higher than that of the winner of the previous Schneider Cup race in 1927. For this feat, Dal Molin was awarded the Silver Medal of Aeronautic Valor.

While conducting flight tests of the Savoia-Marchetti S.65 racing floatplane on 18 January 1930, Dal Molin was killed when the plane crashed in Lake Garda. He held the rank of pilot marshal —a warrant officer rank — at the time of his death.

The poet, playwright, orator, journalist, and soldier Gabriele D'Annunzio attended a memorial service for Dal Molin, whose body subsequently was recovered by a diver. Dal Molin is buried at Chiampo.

== Commemoration ==
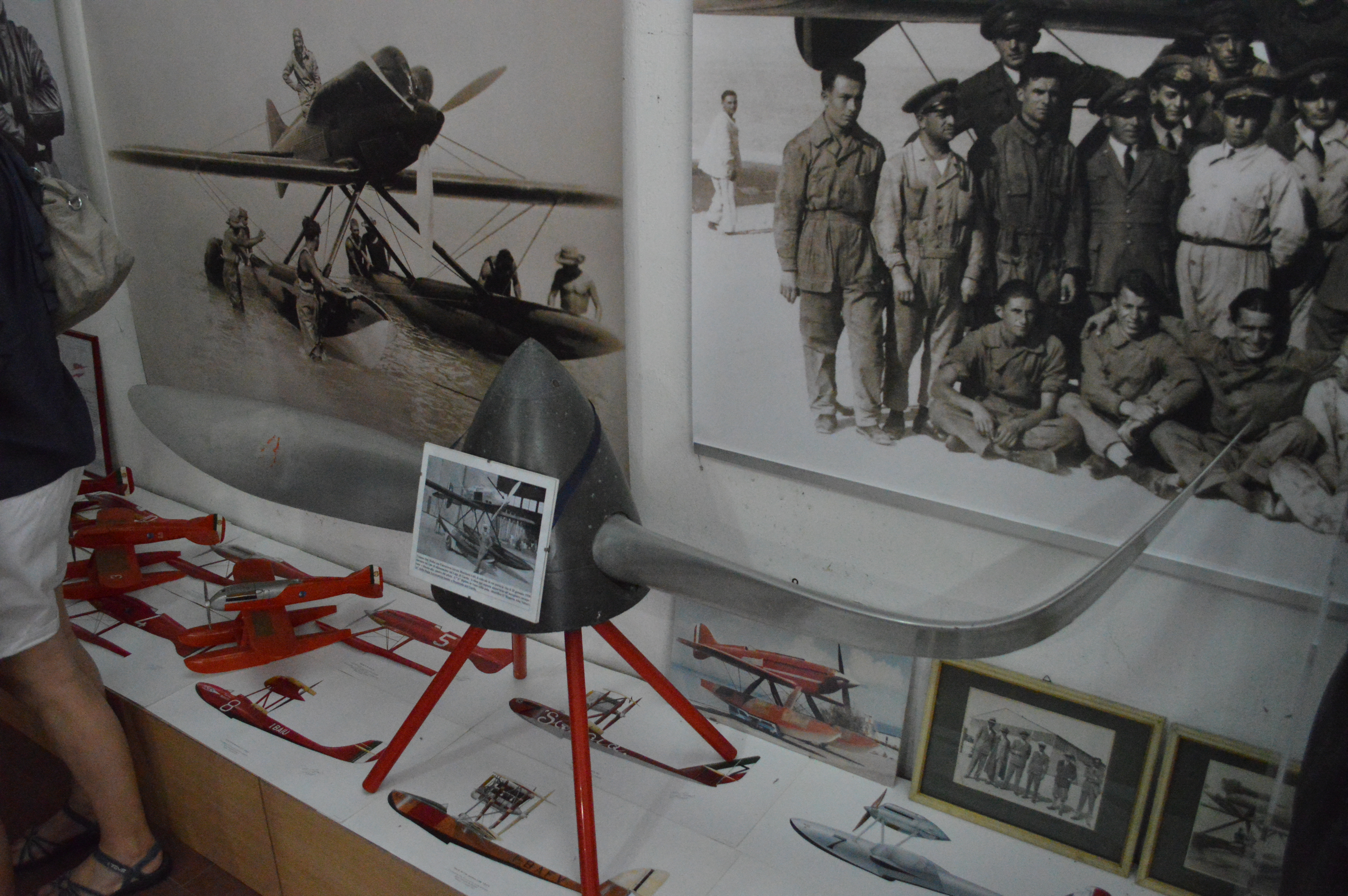
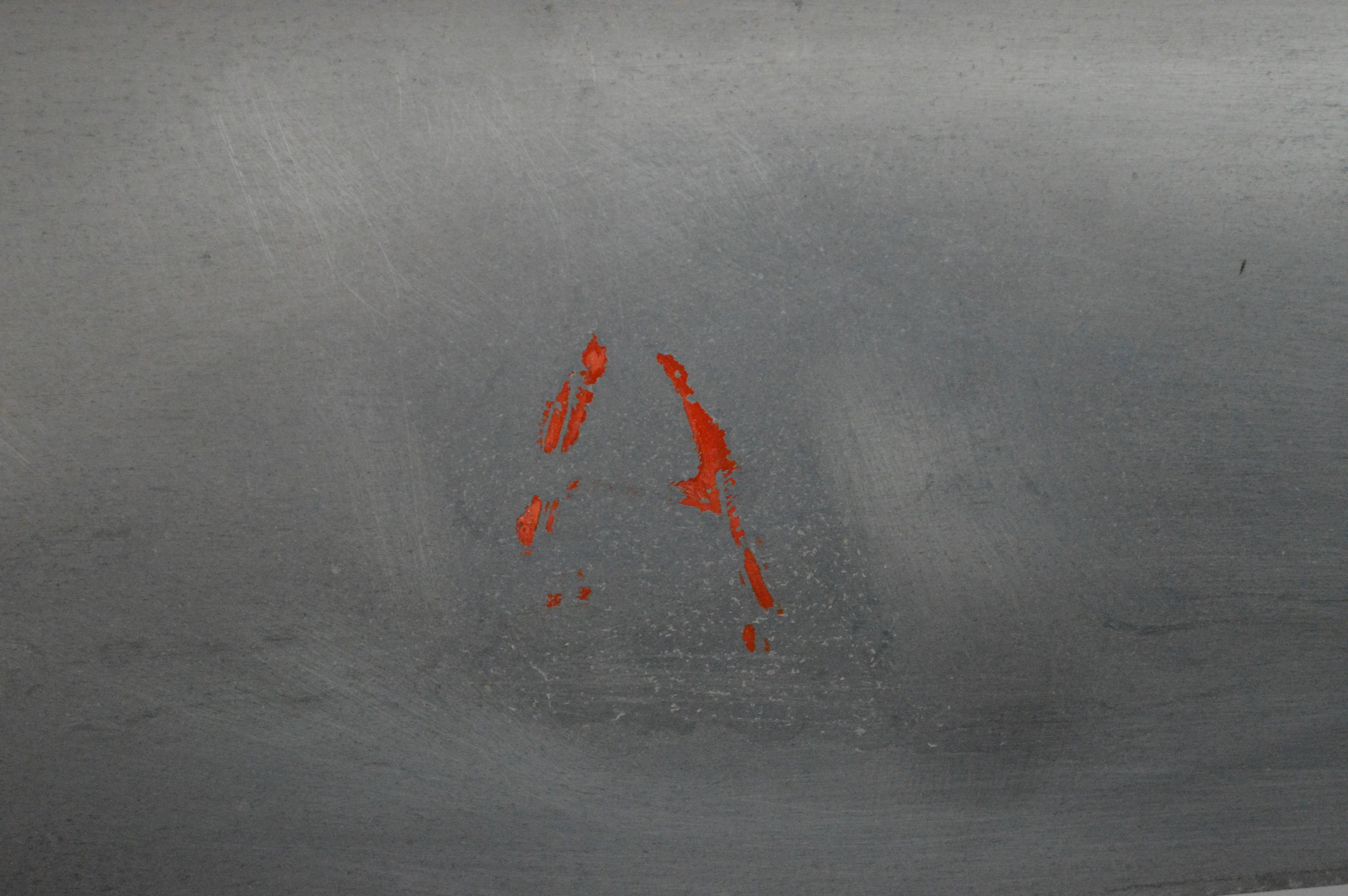
LEFT: The propeller of the Savoia-Marchetti S.65 Dal Molin was piloting at the time of his fatal crash. RIGHT: A red "A" on the S.65′s propeller, indicating that it belonged to the Regia Aeronautica′s High Speed School.

The propeller of the Savoia-Marchetti S.65 Dal Molin was piloting at the time of his fatal crash was recovered and presented to his mother. It now is on public display.

The Gruppo Volo a Vela Tommaso Dal Molin ("Tommaso Dal Molin Gliding Group") in Varese, Italy, was named for Dal Molin. In 1933, it constructed a single-seat flying boat glider known as the GVV Dal Molin Roma.

Vicenza Airport, officially L'Aeroporto di Vicenza "Tommaso Dal Molin", which opened in 1921, was named for Dal Molin after his death. It closed in 2008.

A museum in Vicenza, Italy, located near the former Vicenza Airport, is dedicated to Dal Molin.

A stadium in Arzignano, Stadio Tommaso Dal Molin, is named for Dal Molin.

== Honors and awards ==
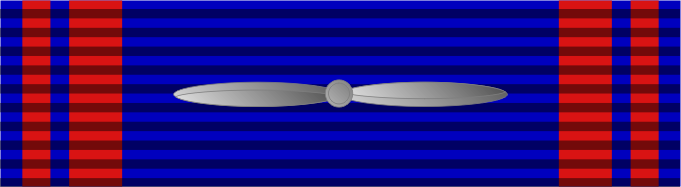

Silver Medal of Aeronautic Valor

The citation for Dal Molin's Silver Medal of Aeronautic Valor reads:

A pilot of exceptional skill and admirable daring, he experimented with difficult high-speed aircraft; in an important world competition he represented the Italian air force with a result equal to the task entrusted to him. - Desenzano del Garda-Calshot, 6/28-1928, 9/7-1929.
