= 290 (disambiguation) =

290 may refer to:

- 290 (year)
- 290 (number)
- UFC 290
- Blériot 290
