= CA 120 =

CA 120 may refer to:

- California State Route 120, a state highway in the US state of California
- Caproni Ca.120, an experimental aircraft
