= CA-124 =

CA-124 may refer to:

- California State Route 124, a highway in the US state of California
- Caproni Ca.124, an experimental aircraft
