= Isotta Fraschini Asso 750 =

Italian W 18 water-cooled aircraft engine of the 1930s

Asso 750
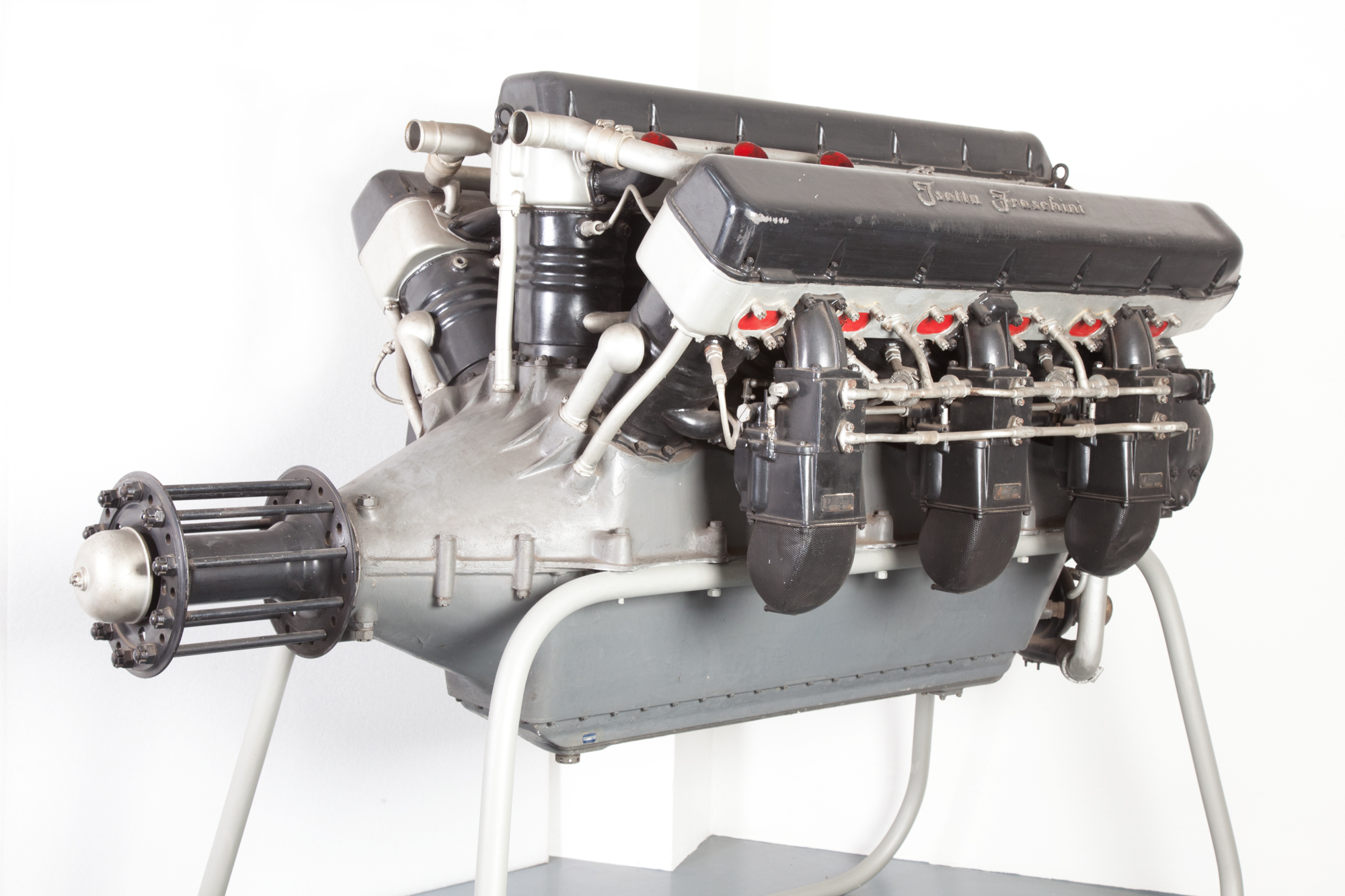
- Preserved Asso 750
- Type: W 18 piston engine
- National origin: Italy
- Manufacturer: Isotta Fraschini
- First run: 1934

The Isotta Fraschini Asso 750 was an Italian W 18 water-cooled aircraft engine of the 1930s. Produced by Isotta Fraschini the engine displaced just under 48 L (2,900 cu in) and produced up to 940 hp (700 kW). Together with the Asso 200 and the Asso 500 the Asso 750 was part of a family of modular engines, that used common and interchangeable components to lower production costs.

== Technical description ==
The W-18 Asso 750 had three six-cylinder in-line banks made of chrome-manganese steel, each joined by a single cast aluminum head for each bank of cylinders.

== Operational history ==
A version with an effective power of 940 hp (700 kW) was optimized for the Savoia-Marchetti S.55X used for the trans-Atlantic flight of Italo Balbo.

== Variants ==
Asso 750
Direct-drive, unsupercharged.
Asso 750 R.
Development with modified crankcase and crankshaft, fitted with a 0.658:1 reduction gear. Maximum power output 940 hp (700 kW).
Asso 750 R.C.
Asso 750 R.C.35
The 750 R. fitted with a supercharger, rated altitude of 3,500 m (11,500 ft).
Asso 750 M
A 57.25 L (3,494 cu in) racing development with 150 mm (5.9 in) bore and 180 mm (7.1 in) stroke, for the Macchi M.67, re-designated Asso 1000 Ri.

== Applications ==
- CANT Z.501 (early versions)
- Caproni Ca.111
- Macchi M.C.77
- Savoia-Marchetti S.55
- Savoia-Marchetti S.62
- Savoia-Marchetti S.78

== Engines on display ==
At the Italian Air Force Museum two Isotta Fraschini Asso 750 are exhibited: A direct-drive Asso 750 and an Asso 750 R.C.35 with reduction gear and supercharger.

== Specifications (Asso 750) ==
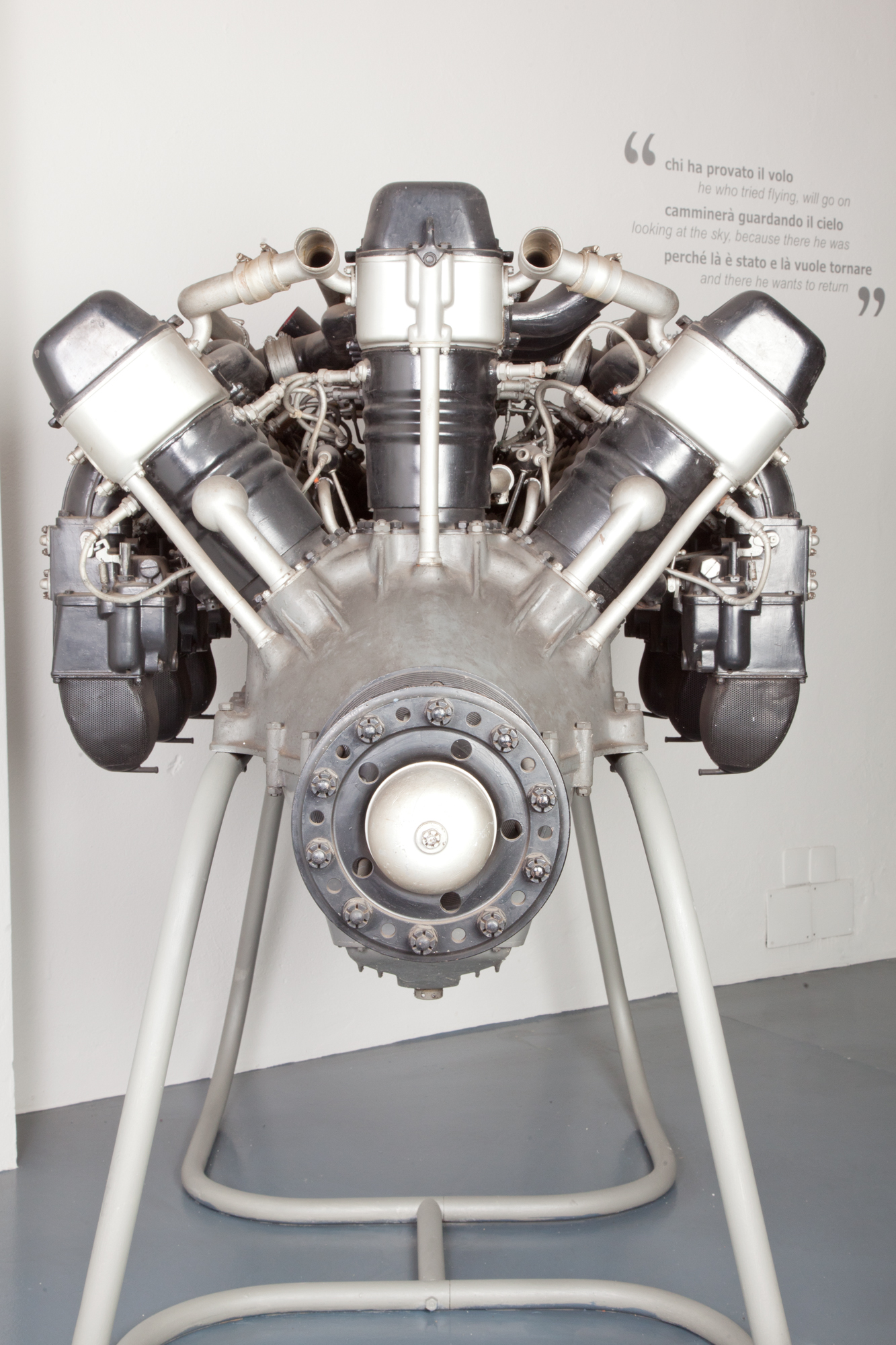
Front view

Data from Il motore Isotta Fraschini Asso 750

=== General characteristics ===
- Type: W-18 liquid/water-cooled
- Bore: 140 mm (5.5 in)
- Stroke: 170 mm (6.7 in)
- Displacement: 47.6 L (2,900 cu in)
- Length: 2,196 mm (86.5 in)
- Width: 1,060 mm (42 in)
- Height: 1,060 mm (42 in)
- Dry weight: 630 kg (1,390 lb)

=== Components ===
- Valvetrain: Overhead valves 2x inlet and 2x exhaust per cylinder
- Supercharger: No supercharger fitted to this variant: supercharger available in other variants - (R.C.35 rated to 3,500 m (11,500 ft)).
- Fuel type: Gasoline 87 Octane
- Oil system: pressure
- Cooling system: Liquid/water
- Reduction gear: Not fitted to this variant: reduction geared variants available (0.658:1 R. and R.C.35).

=== Performance ===
- Power output: Normal 800 hp (600 kW) at 1,700 rpm; Take-off 850 hp (630 kW) at 1,750 rpm; Max 900 hp (670 kW) at 1,900 rpm
- Compression ratio: 5.6:1
- Specific fuel consumption: 0.295 kg/kWh (0.485 lb/(hp⋅h))
- Oil consumption: 0.00114 kg/kWh (0.00187 lb/(hp⋅h))
- Power-to-weight ratio: Normal 0.95 kW/kg (0.58 hp/lb) max 1.129 kW/kg (0.687 hp/lb)

== See also ==
Related lists

- List of aircraft engines
