= CANT Z.508 =

Italian aircraft

General information
- Type: Heavy bomber flying boat
- Manufacturer: Cantieri Aeronautici e Navali Triestini
- Number built: 3

History
- First flight: 1936

The CANT Z.508 was a three-engine Italian flying boat developed from the CANT Z.501 for use as a heavy bomber.

== Design and development ==
Designed as a scaled-up three-engine version of the single-engine Z.501 for use as a heavy bomber. The aircraft was not put into production although the prototype set several world records for its class, including the lifting of a 1,000 kg (2,200 lb) load.

== Specifications (Z.508) ==
Data from The Illustrated Encyclopedia of Aircraft, Italian Civil and Military aircraft 1930–1945

General characteristics

- Length: 21.46 m (70 ft 5 in)
- Wingspan: 30.00 m (98 ft 5 in)
- Height: 5.66 m (18 ft 7 in)
- Powerplant: 3 × Isotta-Fraschini Asso XI R.C.40 V-12 liquid-cooled piston engines, 630 kW (840 hp) each

Performance

- Maximum speed: 315 km/h (196 mph, 170 kn)
- Alighting speed: 121 km/h; 65 kn (75 mph)

== See also ==
Related lists

- List of flying boats and floatplanes
