= Macchi M.C.77 =

1930s Italian flying boat

M.C.77

General information
- Type: Patrol aircraft
- Manufacturer: Macchi
- Designer: Mario Castoldi
- Status: prototype only
- Primary user: Regia Aeronautica
- Number built: 1

History
- First flight: 1935

The Macchi M.C.77 was a reconnaissance bomber flying boat built by Macchi in the thirties and remained at the prototype stage.

== Development and design ==
In 1933 the Ministry of Aeronautics issued a specification for the supply of a new reconnaissance and bombing seaplane to be allocated to the Departments of the Regia Aeronautica with the intent of replacing the Savoia-Marchetti S.78 in service since 1932. The CRDA CANT, aeronautical division of the Cantieri Riuniti of the Adriatic and later also the Aeronautica Macchi participated in the competition announcement.

The Macchi M.C.77 was characterized by the central hull configuration with a single step and side floats, high-cantilever monoplane with cantilever, equipped with a motor in a pushing configuration positioned above the hull on a tubular castle. The structure was of mixed type with metal fuselage having the war load stowed inside on one side and the other.

The project was presented to the Regia Aeronautica in 1934, to build the prototype already started, when the rival CANT Z.501 had already flown. The Air Force Genie, however, deemed the project interesting, but significant delays accumulated so that the prototype was only completed in 1935 and was not yet ready for the acceptance tests that were to take place in Nisida in August 1936. At this point, the Regia Aeronautica chose the Z.501 as the replacement for the S.78.

The Macchi also built a scale model that presented to the public at the 1st Milan International Air Show in October 1935, but not getting feedback in the military aviation market decided to stop its development.

== Specifications ==
Data from Jane's all the World's Aircraft 1938, Guida agli aeroplani d'Italia

General characteristics

- Crew: 4
- Length: 12.625 m (41 ft 5 in)
- Wingspan: 17.78 m (58 ft 4 in)
- Height: 3.945 m (12 ft 11 in)
- Wing area: 50 m^{2} (540 sq ft)
- Empty weight: 3,035 kg (6,691 lb)
- Gross weight: 4,835 kg (10,659 lb)
- Powerplant: 1 × Isotta Fraschini Asso 750 W-18 liquid-cooled piston engine, 560 kW (750 hp)
- Propellers: 3-bladed variable-pitch pusher propeller

Performance

- Maximum speed: 303.5 km/h (188.6 mph, 163.9 kn) at sea level

279 km/h (173 mph; 151 kn) at 1,260 m (4,130 ft)
274 km/h (170 mph; 148 kn) at 2,300 m (7,500 ft)
273 km/h (170 mph; 147 kn) at 3,270 m (10,730 ft)
264 km/h (164 mph; 143 kn) at 4,200 m (13,800 ft)at

- Service ceiling: 5,100 m (16,700 ft)
- Absolute ceiling: 5,500 m (18,000 ft)
- Time to altitude: 1,000 m (3,300 ft) in 3 minutes 26 seconds

2,000 m (6,600 ft) in 7 minutes 50 seconds
3,000 m (9,800 ft) in 14 minutes 3 seconds
4,000 m (13,000 ft) in 22 minutes 46 seconds

Armament

- Guns: 2 × 7.7 mm (0.303 in) Breda-SAFAT machine guns in manually operated nose turret and 2 × 7.7 mm (0.303 in) Breda-SAFAT machine guns in the rear manually operated turret
- Bombs: 600 kg (1,300 lb) of bombs stowed in the wings

== See also ==
Aircraft of comparable role, configuration, and era

- Aichi H9A
- Beriev Be-4
- Dornier Do 18
- Fairchild 91
- Saunders-Roe A.36 Lerwick

Related lists

- List of aircraft of World War II
- List of Interwar military aircraft
- List of Regia Aeronautica aircraft used in World War II
- List of flying boats and floatplanes
