= Romanian Naval Aviation =

- Aviația Navală
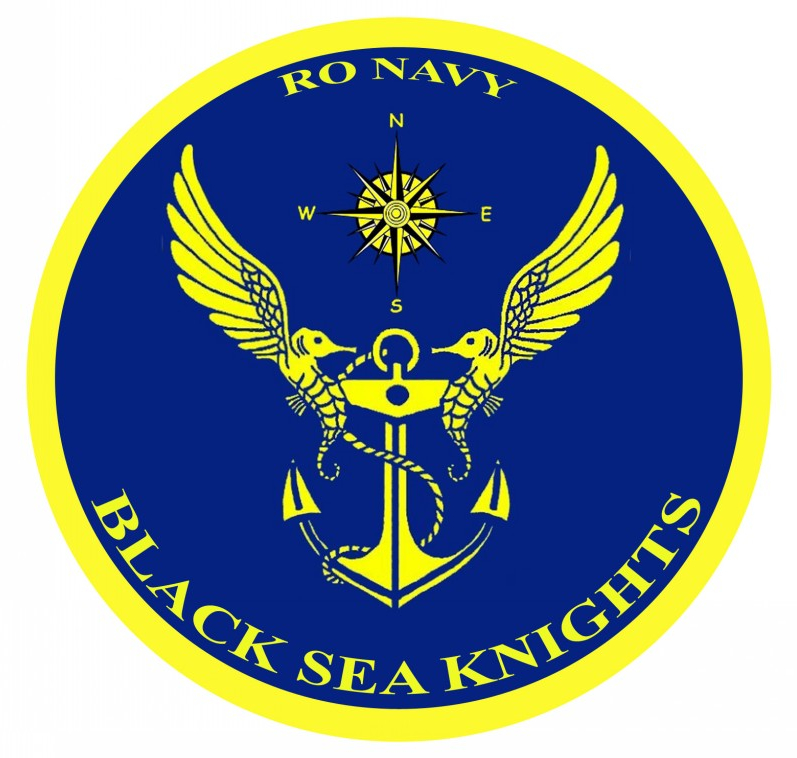
- Badge used by the present day Naval Aviation
- Active: 1920–1960; 2006–Present
- Country: Romania
- Branch: Romanian Naval Forces
- Type: Naval aviation
- Part of: Fleet Command "Viceamiral Vasile Urseanu"
- Engagements: Second World War: Black Sea campaigns

Commanders
- Current commander: Comandor Petre Pavlov

Insignia
- Roundel

The Romanian Naval Aviation is the air arm of the Romanian Navy. It was founded in 1920 as Escadrila de hydroplane (Seaplane Squadron). Currently, the Romanian Naval Aviation consists of Grupul 256 Elicoptere (256th Helicopter Group) equipped with IAR 330 Naval helicopters.

Originally, the Seaplane Squadron operated Hansa-Brandenburg W.29 floatplanes and Hansa-Brandenburg FB flying boats. These were followed by native-built aircraft and imports from Italy (flying boats) and Germany (floatplanes), resulting in a sizable and active force of over 70 watercraft by the time of the Second World War.

== History ==
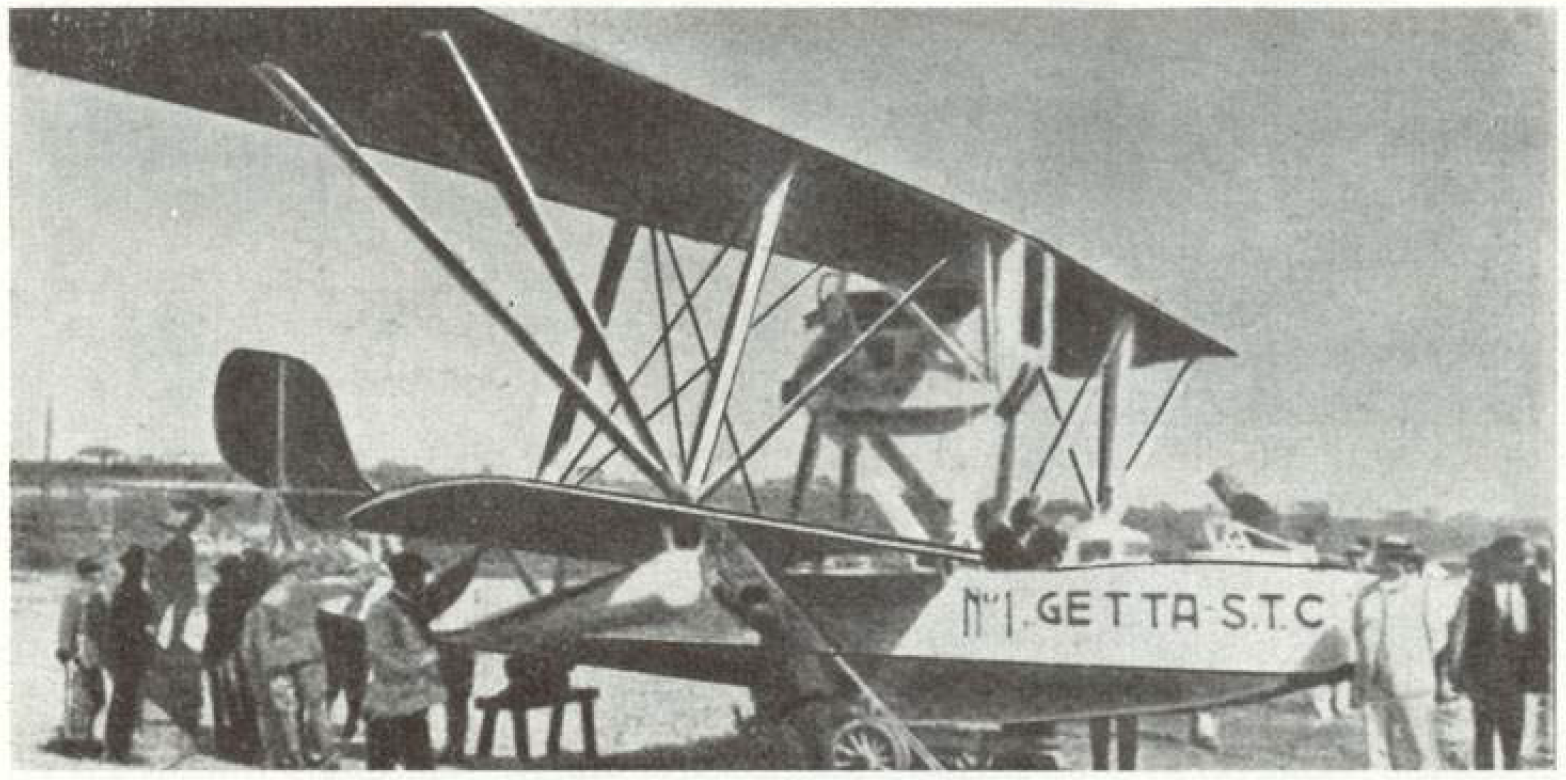
The RAS-1 Getta prototype

The first Romanian seaplane squadron was founded in 1920 by Royal Decree no. 2256 bis, from 15 May 1920, under the command of Captain Constantin Negru. It was named Escadrila de hydroplane and consisted of 12 Hansa-Brandenburg W.29 floatplanes and Hansa-Brandenburg FB flying boats. In 1925 four native-built RAS-1 Getta training flying boats were added. In 1921, the base of the naval aviation was moved to a new base on Lake Siutghiol. By 1928, the Grupul de Hidroaviație (Hydroaviation Group) had 3 squadrons. In 1930, Flotila de Hidroaviație (the Seaplane Flotilla) was established. In the years 1932-1933, at Palazu Mare, a modern seaplane base was built. It was fully equipped with installations and boats for maneuvering seaplanes and for rescuing the crews and seaplanes damaged in case of accident.

The first Romanian-made floatplanes were versions of the SET 7 biplane, a total of eight being were built for the Romanian Naval Aviation.

=== Operational history in World War II ===
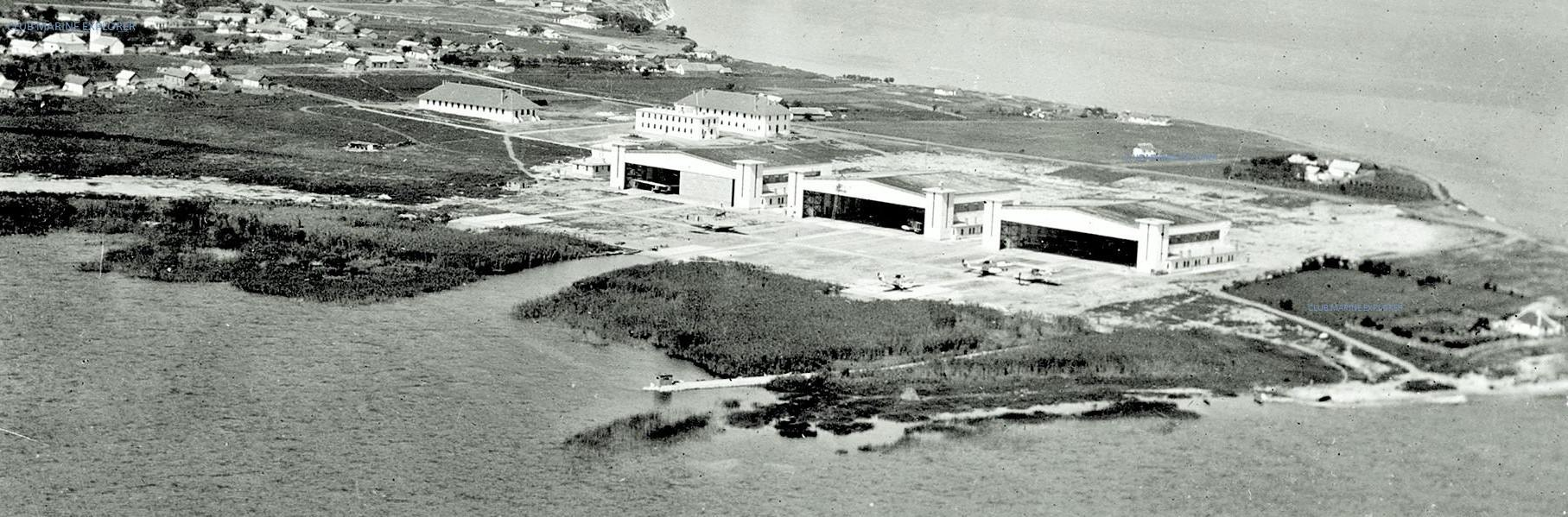
The seaplane base on Lake Siutghiol

In 1941, the Comandamentul Aero Dobrogea (Dobrogea Aero Command) was established, including the Seaplane Flotilla (headquartered at Palazu Mare on Lake Siutghiol) and the 53rd Fighter Squadron (located on the Mamaia airfield). The command was subordinated to the Royal Romanian Navy. On 26 March 1942, its name was changed to Comandamentul Aero Marină (Marine Aero Command). The aircraft and their crews proved their worth in reconnaissance missions along the coast and offshore to the Crimean coast, in the northern Black Sea basin or on the coasts of Asia Minor, as well as in anti-submarine and convoy escort missions.

The most notable achievements of the Romanian Naval Aviation during World War II were the sinking of two Soviet submarines by a single Z.501 in August 1941, followed by the capture of a Soviet armed merchantman by a group of Heinkels in October. Romanian seaplanes monitored Soviet Navy locations and movements for the Luftwaffe bombers, which, with assistance from Escadrila 102, extirpated Soviet submarines from the Black Sea by late-autumn 1941.

A slight defeat came in the autumn of 1943, when a Z.501 was shot down by Soviet ace Grigoriy Rechkalov. Throughout the war, Romania lost 8 seaplanes, of which 7 were due to accidents.

On 8 September 1944, the Seaplane Flotilla headquarters and bases were occupied by Soviet troops. Material goods and the operational archive of the Flotilla were confiscated. After the war, the period of decline continued. As a result of the occupation, the Flotilla headquarters were moved to Lake Snagov where it functioned until 1948, when it was moved back to Palazu Mare.

==== Italian flying boats ====
Before the war, Romania acquired seven Savoia-Marchetti S.55 double-hulled flying boats as well as eleven Savoia-Marchetti SM.62 biplane flying boats. Five of the latter were licence-built locally at the IAR factory in Brașov. In 1941, twelve CANT Z.501 were also purchased. The twelve Z.501s formed Escadrila 101, with more acquired later for Escadrila 102, which also possessed an unspecified number of Savoia-Marchetti S.56. An unspecified amount of Savoia-Marchetti S.59 was also acquired before the war.

==== German floatplanes ====
For training purposes, three Heinkel He 42 were purchased. During the war, 34 Heinkel He 114 were also acquired, followed by an unspecified amount of Arado Ar 196.

== Post-war ==
By 1948, a total of 15 seaplanes remained in the Flotilla, and from 1949 flights resumed from Siutghiol. The Flotilla was disbanded, and in the organization chart of the Air Force Command of 1950 there was only one seaplane squadron left. The squadron was disbanded in 1955, after two airmen fled to Turkey in an He 114 while on a patrol mission. What was left of the flotilla, Patrula 256 Hidroaviație (256th Hydroaviation Patrol), was disbanded on 1 April 1960.

In an article published in Revista Marinei, no. 4-5/April-May 1948, Captain Dan Nicolaescu tried to draw the attention of decision makers to the importance of naval aviation, where he said that: "A navy, no matter how small, cannot do without its aviation, without the sanction of being in a clear state of inferiority to any enemy. Maritime information aviation is an integral part of the navy, an indispensable part, which forms the sailor's eye of which he cannot do without."

In 1978, the 59th Helicopter Squadron, later Helicopter Regiment, was established. It was deployed at Tuzla Airfield and was an aviation unit which, although not subordinate to the command structures of the Navy, it operationally met important criteria defining a maritime aviation structure: it was located in the immediate vicinity of the Black Sea coast and halfway between the main military ports of Constanța and Mangalia, had helicopters equipped with special equipment for flying over the sea and its missions were carried out mainly in cooperation and support of sea and river ship units.

== Modern day ==
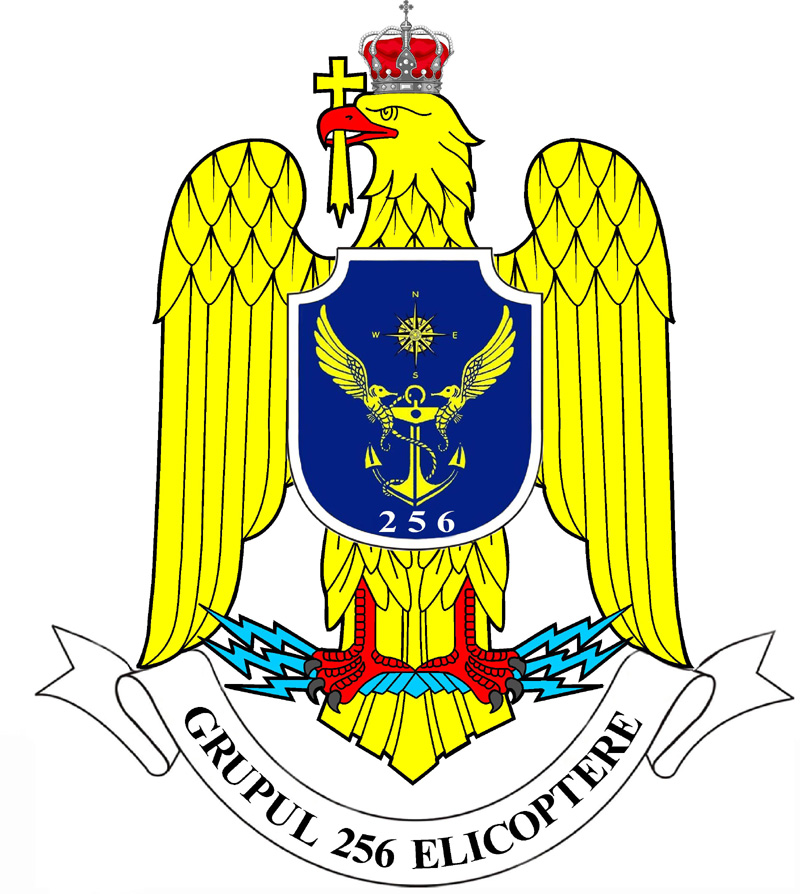
Coat of Arms of the 256th Helicopter Group

An important moment is the entry into the service of the navy of the cruiser Muntenia, the largest military ship ever built in Romania. Desired to be classified as a helicopter carrier, the designers and builders adopted a series of technical solutions to meet this operational requirement. The ship was fitted with an appropriately sized flight deck and hangar, which was scheduled to house an IAR 330L helicopter, however, the installations and equipment necessary for the embarkation and operation of a helicopter on board the ship had not been carried out at a sufficient technical level. The helicopter carrier capability requirements were reported to be met, but no operational helicopter testing was performed on board, and cooperation with aviation specialists was insufficient.

Things changed radically with Romania's accession to the Partnership for Peace and the desire of joining NATO. In this context, the frigate Mărășești (former Muntenia) participated for the first time in a multinational naval exercise led by NATO in the Atlantic Ocean. During the exercise an IAR 316 B helicopter, no. 49, and a detachment belonging to 59th Helicopter Group Tuzla, led by the unit's commander, Paul Constantinescu was embarked on the frigate. The lack of proper helicopter-carrying capabilities and especially the lack of ship stabilization equipment, coupled with adverse weather resulted in only two flights over the Mediterranean and one over the Atlantic. Even in these conditions, this event remains an important milestone in the reaffirmation of naval aviation in Romania.

With the acquisition of the two Type 22 frigates (Regele Ferdinand and Regina Maria), there was a need to purchase helicopters capable of operating on board the frigates. On 1 May 2006, based on the Order no. MS 28 of 20 February 2006 and on Order no. B5/S/966 of 26 April 2006, Grupul 256 Elicoptere (256th Helicopter Group) from Flotila 56 Fregate (56th Frigate Flotilla) operating the IAR 330 Puma Naval was established. Currently, the helicopter group is subordinated to the Fleet Command "Viceamiral Vasile Urseanu" and the helicopters can be based either at the Tuzla Airport or onboard the frigates.

=== Missions ===
The on-board helicopters are currently used for the following missions:

- ASW (Anti-Submarine Warfare) - detection, classification, identification of submarine targets, determination of evolutionary elements and attack of submarines;
- ASuW (Anti-Surface Warfare) - detecting, determining the evolutionary elements of surface targets and classifying them;
- SAR (Search and rescue) - in the lagoon and maritime area;
- Maritime surveillance;
- Logistical support - transport of people, materials, VERTREP, CASEVAC/MEDEVAC;
- Anti-piracy/anti-terrorism operations - insertion / extraction and support of Special Operations Forces.

== List of aircraft ==
=== Flying boats ===
Name	Picture	Origin	Quantity	Note
Hansa-Brandenburg FB		Austria-Hungary	4	First Romanian flying boats. Captured during the war of 1919, used until 1922.
RAS-1 Getta		Romania	4	First Romanian-made flying boats, unarmed In service 1926–1932
Savoia-Marchetti S.55		Italy	7	Double-hulled; In service 1933–1942
Savoia-Marchetti S.56		Italy	6	Biplane, unarmed In service 1932–1943
Savoia-Marchetti S.59		Italy	9	Biplane bomber, one 7.7 mm machine gun In service 1928–1942
Savoia-Marchetti SM.62		Italy; Romania	15	Five licence-built locally; biplane bomber, four 7.7 mm machine guns In service 1932–1945
CANT Z.501		Italy	12	Largest Romanian flying boats; monoplane bomber, two or three 7.7 mm machine guns In service 1940–1945

=== Floatplanes ===
Name	Picture	Origin	Quantity	Note
Hansa-Brandenburg W.29		Austria-Hungary	12	First floatplanes used by Romania. UFAG-made aircraft captured during the war of 1919, used until 1922.
SET 7H		Romania	8	First Romanian-made floatplanes
Heinkel He 42		Germany	3	Used for training In service 1943–1946
Heinkel He 114		Germany	34	Light bomber & reconnaissance In service 1942–1960
Arado Ar 196		Germany	2	Light bomber & reconnaissance, two 7.92 mm machine guns and two 20 mm cannons. Two Ar 196A-3 were used by the Seaplane Flotilla and deployed at Odessa in 1943.

=== Helicopters ===
Name	Picture	Origin	Quantity	Note
IAR 330 Naval		Romania	3	In service
H215M		France; Romania	2	To be delivered

=== Drones ===
Name	Picture	Origin	Quantity	Note
MQ-35A V-BAT		United States	4	In service

== Bibliography ==
- Antoniu, Dan (2014). Illustrated History of Romanian Aeronautics. ISBN 978-973-0-17209-6.
