= Savoia-Marchetti SM.78 =

Italian warplane

SM.78

General information
- Type: Bomber/reconnaissance flying boat
- Manufacturer: Savoia-Marchetti
- Number built: 49

History
- First flight: 1932

The Savoia-Marchetti SM.78 was an Italian bomber/reconnaissance biplane flying boat of the early 1930s.

== Development ==
The SM.78 first flew at the end of 1932, designed for the role of maritime reconnaissance-bomber. It was one of the many flying boats made by SIAI (Savoia-Marchetti), that in 1915 had started building foreign aircraft under licence, followed two years later by the first of its own designs.

The SM.78 was developed from the SM.62bis. The prototype, which carried the serial number MM222, made its first flight late in 1932 and then transferred the next year to Vigna di Valle for evaluation. The SM.78 was the last biplane flying boat, built or used in large numbers by Italy; 49 were completed in all (32 by Piaggio and 17 by SIAI).

=== Technical description ===
The SM.78 was a single-bay biplane. It had a long and slim aft fuselage, with a tall welded steel fin and a wooden horizontal tail mounted centrally. The lower hull had two steps, to aid take-off from the sea.

This aircraft evolved from the SM.62bis, retaining practically the same unmodified wings, tail and fuselage, but with a different model of Handley Page flaps.

The hull/fuselage had poplar frames, and longerons made of ash. The plywood-skinned hull had a double-layered bottom, with an external layer of cedar, while the flanks were made from orthogonally arranged laminates of cedar. The fabric-covered wings had spruce longerons and poplar ribs, utilising the low-weight and high-strength characteristics of these woods, and were painted to render them impermeable to water. Twin stabilising floats were mounted at mid-wing.

While the pilot and co-pilot were seated side-by-side in an enclosed cockpit in the prototype, this was replaced by an open cockpit in the production model. A crew position mounting a 7.7 mm (0.303 in) Lewis Gun was situated in the nose, which also contained two cameras. This position was manned by the co-pilot when necessary, the aircraft having a three-man crew. A second, enclosed turret was fitted in the dorsal position, also armed with a 7.7 mm (.303 in) Lewis gun, manned by the gunner/radio operator, who was also provided with an R.A.350 transmitter and an A.R.4 receiver. The aircraft was not fitted with an intercom, but the two pilots could communicate with the nose position using a "pneumatic message" system in which messages were passed through a tube. The forward machine gun had 564 rounds of ammunition in 12 magazines, while the aft machine gun had 470 in 10 magazines. Bombs were carried in a bomb bay within the lower wing, near to the fuselage. The weapon-load was 700 kg (1,540 lb) maximum. Typical combinations were: 2 × 250 kg (550 lb) and 2 × 100 kg (220 lb) bombs, 6 × 100 kg (220 lb) bombs, 4 × 70 kg (150 lb) depth charges, or 6 × 12 kg (26 lb) training bombs. Smoke generators could also be mounted on the inner hardpoints. A "Jozza" bombsight was located on the right in the cockpit, behind a glazed window.

The aircraft was powered by a single Isotta Fraschini Asso 750 W18 engine, generating 671 kW (900 hp) at takeoff, arranged in a steel structure mounted between the two wings, driving a four-bladed propeller with variable pitch that could be set before takeoff. This, and the much refined hull of this aircraft bestowed a good performance for the time. A CO_{2} fire extinguisher was mounted by the engine. A total of 2,200 L (580 US gal) of fuel could be carried in six unarmoured duralumin fuselage tanks, two aft, two central and two forward.

== Operational history ==
The SM.78 was built between 1932 and 1935, with only 16 by SIAI and 32 from Piaggio. It equipped the 141° Squadriglia, based at La Spezia, the 144° based at Livorno, the 182° at Nisida and the 189° at Syracuse. It continued to serve until 1938, being replaced by the CANT Z.501, a monoplane design with superior performance. Some aircraft remained in service during the early phase of World War II, performing in an air-sea-rescue capacity. Spain, which already operated SM.62s, tried unsuccessfully to acquire a licence to build the SM.78, leaving Italy as the only operator.

== Operators ==
Kingdom of Italy

- Regia Aeronautica

== Specifications (SM.78) ==
Data from Italian Civil and Military Aircraft 1930–1945

General characteristics

- Crew: 3
- Length: 12.26 m (40 ft 3 in)
- Wingspan: 16.66 m (54 ft 8 in)
- Height: 4.34 m (14 ft 3 in)
- Wing area: 65.76 m^{2} (707.8 sq ft)
- Empty weight: 2,944 kg (6,490 lb)
- Gross weight: 5,039 kg (11,110 lb)
- Powerplant: 1 × Isotta Fraschini Asso 750 R.C.35 W-18 liquid-cooled piston engine, 712 kW (955 hp)
- Propellers: 3-bladed constant-speed propellers

Performance

- Maximum speed: 245 km/h (152 mph, 132 kn)
- Cruise speed: 220 km/h (140 mph, 120 kn)
- Range: 2,400 km (1,500 mi, 1,300 nmi)
- Endurance: 11.5 hours
- Service ceiling: 4,000 m (13,000 ft)
- Time to altitude:

- 1,000 m (3,300 ft) in 5 min 37s
- 2,000 m (6,600 ft) in 14 min 30 s
- 3,000 m (9,800 ft) in 29 min 43 s
- 3,800 m (12,500 ft) in 53 min 40 s

Armament

- Guns: 4 × 7.7 mm (.303 in) machine guns
- Bombs: 6 × 100 kg bomb load

== See also ==
Related development

- Savoia-Marchetti S.59
- Savoia-Marchetti SM.62

Related lists

- List of Interwar military aircraft
- List of flying boats and floatplanes
