= Filippo Zappata =

Italian engineer and aircraft designer

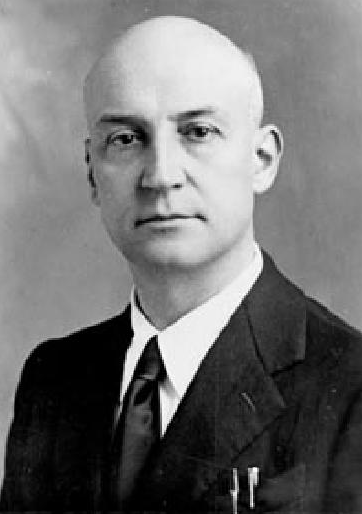
- Filippo Zappata in the 1930s
- Born: 6 July 1894; Ancona, Kingdom of Italy
- Died: 30 August 1994 (aged 100); Gallarate, Italy
- Burial place: Cimitero di Tavernelle
- Education: Regia Scuola Superiore Navale di Genova
- Occupations: Aeronautical engineer, aircraft designer
- Known for: development of the CANT Z.1007 for Fascist Italy
- Awards: Legion of Honour (1932); Gold Medal of Aeronautic Valor (1991)
- Military career
- Allegiance: Kingdom of Italy
- Branch: Bersaglieri
- Service years: 1915–1918
- Rank: Capitano
- Scientific career
- Fields: Aerodynamics
- Workplaces: Officine Aeronautiche Gabardini; Blériot Aéronautique; Cantieri Riuniti dell'Adriatico; Società Italiana Ernesto Breda; Agusta

Filippo Zappata (6 July 1894 – 30 August 1994) was an Italian engineer and aircraft designer. He worked for Officine Aeronautiche Gabardini, Cantieri Riuniti dell'Adriatico (CANT), Blériot, Breda, and Agusta. Zappata was the designer of many record-breaking seaplanes.

== Early life ==
Filippo Zappata was born in Ancona in 1894. Wishing to become a naval engineer, he began studies at the Regia Scuola d'Ingegneria Navale di Genova (Royal School of Naval Engineering of Genoa). At the outbreak of World War I, he volunteered for military service as a lieutenant in the Bersaglieri, the elite Italian infantry corps. He was badly wounded in action in December 1916. Once recovered, in 1918, he was assigned to military-technical services. In 1921 he graduated in mechanical engineering from the Regia Scuola d'Ingegneria Navale di Genova. He first worked for the Officine Aeronautiche Gabardini where he soon became deputy technical director and contributed significantly to the design of the single-seat biplane fighter Gabardini G.9. He then moved to Cantieri Riuniti dell'Adriatico, CANT, in Monfalcone, organising the technical offices. Subsequently designed for the Airline Aero Espresso the Titano, a giant seaplane of 12 tons. His reputation spread internationally and in 1928 he was invited to work at the French firm Blériot. After a few years with this firm Zappata designed and brought to fulfilment several aircraft, among which were:

- 1931: single-engined BZ.110 Joseph le Brix that won a world record.
- 1932: four-engined Santos Dumont BZ-5190 Atlantic civil postal seaplane.
- 1932: single-engined BZ.290, amphibian.

Zappata became known for the quality of his designs, that combined aerodynamic research with a sense of aesthetics and elegance. «The most aerodynamic airplane - he claimed - is also the most beautiful».

== Career ==
In 1933 Marshal Italo Balbo, Minister of the Italian Air Force, contacted Blériot to ask if Dr. Filippo Zappata could be released from the French contract so that he could work in Italy again. Blériot agreed, with the understanding that Zappata acted as a consultant for the final work on the postal seaplane Santos Dumont. This aircraft was a complete success beating world distance records and Zappata was awarded the Légion d'Honneur by the French Government. He was now back at CANT in Monfalcone and developed such a large number of highly successful projects that the firm expanded in a few years from 340 workers to 5,500 workers.

=== Seaplanes ===
At CANT, Zappata designed a series of successful multi-engined seaplanes such as the CANT Z.501 Gabbiano flying boat and the CANT Z.506 Airone floatplane. Zappata's predilection for all-wooden airframes was strongly in evidence in both Gabbiano and Airone. Despite this, both planes were robust and stood up well to harsh conditions. In association with test pilot Mario Stoppani, chief pilot for CANT, Zappata's designs set 41 world aeronautical records. CANT Z.506 still holds the distance record for a seaplane in a closed circuit.

=== Medium bombers ===
In the mid-1930s Zappata designed a series of medium bombers, including the three-engined CANT Z.1007 and twin-engined CANT Z.1011. Along with the Savoia-Marchetti SM.79, the CANT Z.1007 formed the backbone of the Regia Aeronautica's wartime medium bomber force. Production began in 1939 and by June 1940, 87 units were combat-ready in the Z-1007 and Z-1007bis versions outfitting the 16th and 47th bomber wings. Its worst drawback was the scarcity of its defensive armament, but in all other respects, it proved to be an excellent bomber, operating in the Mediterranean (as a torpedo bomber as well), in North Africa and, briefly, in Russia. The last design by Filippo Zappata before he left CANT for Breda was the Z.1018 Leone twin-engined medium bomber, considered the best bomber built in Italy during World War II.

=== Breda ===
Around 1939 Zappata became disillusioned with CANT. At the beginning of 1942, the Società Italiana Ernesto Breda, idle after the failure of its Ba.88, offered him the post of chief aeronautical engineer. Aware of the importance of this firm, Zappata accepted. At Breda, Zappata proposed several variants of the CANT Z.1018 Leone:

- BZ.301 (Breda-Zappata, mod.301), high altitude bomber;
- BZ.302, high altitude fighter;
- BZ.303, night fighter, torpedo bomber multirole;
- BZ.304, anti-tank (perhaps with a 37 mm gun).

The Italian Air Ministry authorized only the BZ.301 and 303, called Leone II and Leone III. The signing of the Armistice of Cassibile in September 1943, the subsequent occupation of the Italian peninsula by the Wehrmacht, and the almost total destruction of the Breda aircraft factory on 30 April 1944 by U.S. bombers, ensured that none of the new projects launched by Zappata during the latter stages of World War II were realized. The sole prototype of BZ.303 under construction in 1943 was destroyed by the Germans soon after the armistice.

== Career after the War ==
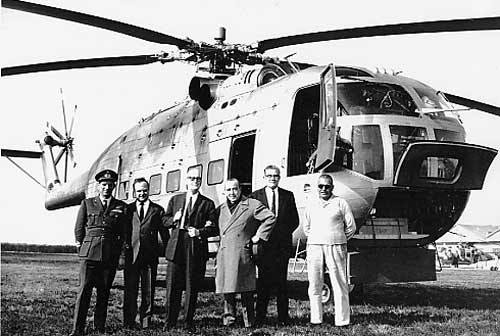
A.101 helicopter in 1964. Third from right is Count Domenico Agusta and fourth is Filippo Zappata

In 1942, still during wartime, Zappata designed a large four-engined airliner, the Breda-Zappata BZ.308. On 8 September 1943 only the prototype fuselage of the BZ.308 was built. In the period 1944-45, the work was blocked by the Germans. After the war, the Allied Control Commission halted the work, which was not resumed until January 1947. The first flight was on 27 August 1948, piloted by Mario Stoppani. Although flight testing went well and despite orders from India, Argentina and Persia, the project was abandoned due to pressure from the Allies for Italy to refrain from competing in civilian aircraft manufacture. Breda subsequently stopped producing aircraft entirely.

Zappata's four-engined airliner was Italy's largest plane at the time. It weighed from 46 to 52 tons and could cruise, fully loaded, for 10 to 12 hours. It carried a crew of 7 in addition to 48 passengers on long flights and 80 passengers on short hauls. It had a wing span of 138 feet, was 121 feet long, and had a maximum speed of 367 miles an hour and a cruising speed of 292 miles. Breda sold the prototype of the BZ.308 to the Italian Air Force in August 1951.

Zappata left the Società Italiana Ernesto Breda in 1951. The following year he accepted to become the chief aeronautical engineer of the Italian helicopter manufacturer Agusta. He designed the Agusta AZ.8L, a small, four-engined short-range airliner tested on 9 June 1958, and contributed significantly to the design of the large transport helicopter A.101. These transport aircraft were very advanced for their time, but could not be put into production because of the lack of ancillary equipment. A consultant for a few years, Zappata retired in 1973. He was awarded the Gold Medal of Aeronautic Valor in 1991. Filippo Zappata died at Gallarate in 1994 at the age of 100.

== Sources ==
- Jona, Alberto (1974). "Adventures and ventures in the Italian aircraft industry". The Aeronautical Journal. 78 (758–759): 65–79. doi:10.1017/S0001924000036484. S2CID 117680974.
- Evangelisti, Giorgio (1986). "Filippo Zappata: profilo di un progettista". Rivista aeronautica. 62 (4): 100–107.
- Evangelisti, Giorgio; Zappata, Giuseppe (1996). Le navi aeree di Filippo Zappata. Florence: Editoriale Olimpia. ISBN 978-8825316032.
- Franks, Norman; Guest, Russell; Alegi, Gregory. Above the War Fronts: The British Two-seater Bomber Pilot and Observer Aces, the British Two-seater Fighter Observer Aces, and the Belgian, Italian, Austro-Hungarian and Russian Fighter Aces, 1914–1918: Volume 4 of Fighting Airmen of WWI Series: Volume 4 of Air Aces of WWI. Grub Street, 1997. ISBN 1-898697-56-6, ISBN 978-1-898697-56-5.
