= CANT Z.1011 =

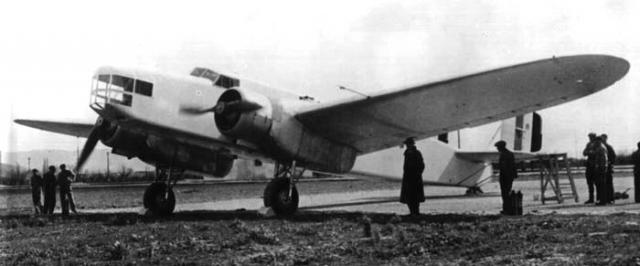

General information
- Type: Heavy bomber
- National origin: Italy
- Manufacturer: CANT (Cantiere Riuniti dell'Adriatico)
- Designer: Filippo Zappata
- Number built: 6

History
- First flight: 2 March 1936

The twin-engined CANT Z.1011 was one of two bombers of about the same size and powered by the same engines, designed by Filippo Zappata in the mid-1930s. The other was the three-engined CANT Z.1007, which in the end was the type preferred by the Regia Aeronautica.

== Design and development ==
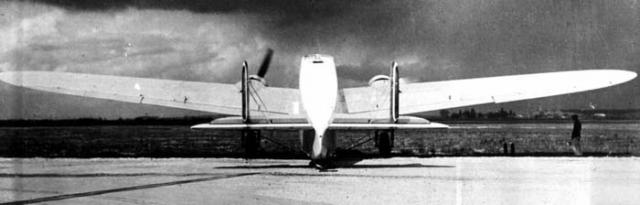
Rear view

The CANT Z.1011 was a low wing cantilever monoplane with a wooden structure. The wings had three wooden spars, spruce and plywood ribs and plywood covering. The whole trailing edge was occupied by ailerons and inboard flaps. The fuselage was flat sided with plywood covering. The tailplane, placed on top of the fuselage, was braced to it with pairs of parallel struts and carried twin fins and rudders. The fins were braced to the tailplane by further pairs of struts on their inner sides. The fixed tail surfaces were again plywood covered but the control surfaces were covered in fabric. The engines were conventionally wing mounted and the main legs and wheels of the tailwheel undercarriage retracted rearwards into cowling extensions behind them. Mainwheels were fitted with brakes.

The enclosed pilots' compartment was over the leading edge of the wing, with a bomb-aimer's position in the nose. There were dorsal and ventral gunner's positions respectively over and aft of the wing, each equipped with twin machine guns.

The Z.1011 made its first flight on 2 March 1936 powered by 710 kW (950 hp) Gnome-Rhône Mistral Major RC radial engines, but these were soon replaced with 610 kW (820 hp) V-12 Isotta-Fraschini Asso XI.RCs. Five Z.1011 prototypes were built before the Regia Aeronautica chose to order the three-engined Z.1007. After that decision the Z.1011 was used as a transport.

== Operators ==
Kingdom of Italy

- Regia Aeronautica

== Specifications ==
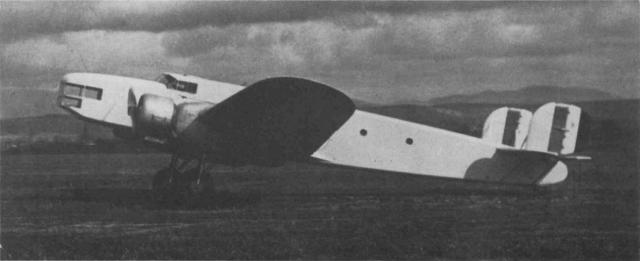
Side view

Data from Jane's All the World's Aircraft 1938

General characteristics

- Crew: 4
- Length: 17 m (55 ft 9 in)
- Wingspan: 25 m (82 ft 0 in)
- Wing area: 78 m^{2} (840 sq ft)
- Empty weight: 5,700 kg (12,566 lb)
- Powerplant: 2 × Isotta Fraschini Asso XI.RC 60° V-12, water-cooled supercharged piston, 610 kW (820 hp) each at 4,500 m (14,760 ft)
- Propellers: 2-bladed variable pitch

Performance

- Maximum speed: 370 km/h (230 mph, 200 kn) at 4,500 m (14,760 ft)
- Range: 2,000 km (1,200 mi, 1,100 nmi)
- Service ceiling: 8,000 m (26,000 ft)
- Time to altitude: 15.2 min to 4,000 m (13,120 ft)
