= Breda-Zappata BZ.308 =

Italian four-engined long range airliner, 1948

B.Z.308
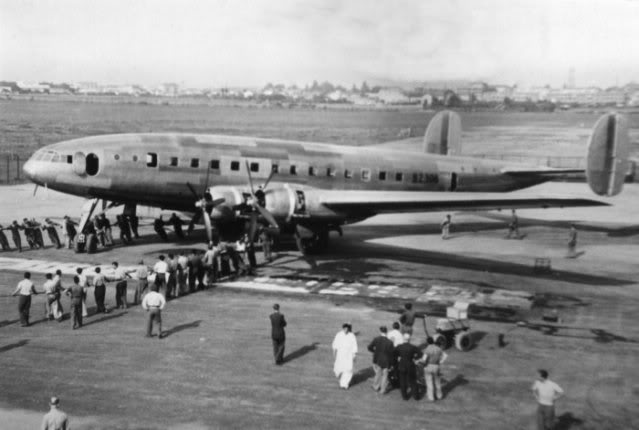

General information
- Type: Four-engined airliner
- Manufacturer: Breda
- Designer: Filippo Zappata
- Primary user: Italian Air Force
- Number built: 1

History
- Introduction date: 1949
- First flight: 27 August 1948

The Breda-Zappata B.Z.308 was an Italian four-engined airliner produced by Breda.

== Design and development ==
it was conceived by the engineer Filippo Zappata in 1942, still in time war, with all the problems connected to the priorities of the moment, so much so that the September 8, 1943 only the fuselage of the prototype was built. In the period 1944-45 the work was blocked first by the Germans and, at the end of the conflict, by the Allies, whose Allied Armistice Commission prohibited the continuation of any aeronautical project until the beginning of 1946.Vincenzo Melecca

The B.Z.308 was a four-engined civil transport developed in the late 1940s for operation over both European and transatlantic routes. A large low-wing monoplane of all-metal construction, it was powered by four Bristol Centaurus radial engines driving five-bladed propellers. It had a large tailplane with endplate fins and rudders, and had retractable landing gear. The fuselage, oval in cross-section, accommodated a flight crew of five and 55 passengers in two cabins; a high-density model was planned with seats for 80.

In early 1946 the work resumed, also slowed down by British resistance to delivering the needed engines, so the aircraft was completed in June 1946 and the first flight took place on August 27, 1948. V.Meleca

Construction began during 1946, under aircraft designer Filippo Zappata at Breda's Sesto San Giovanni works. The Allied Commission halted the work, which was not resumed until January 1947. Further delays in the delivery of Bristol Centaurus engines delayed the first flight, which was on 27 August 1948, piloted by Mario Stoppani. Although flight testing went well, the project was abandoned as a result of financial problems, and anticipated competition from American airliners in the postwar market. Breda subsequently stopped producing aircraft entirely.

== Operational history ==
The prototype B.Z.308 was acquired by the Italian Air Force in 1949 as a transport aircraft (MM61802). Despite orders in 1950 from India, Argentina and Persia, only the prototype was built, allegedly also due to pressure from the allies for Italy to refrain from competing in civilian aircraft manufacture after the war.

On 27 August 1948 the B.Z.308 made its maiden flight in front of civil and military authorities, politicians and the Italian President. The prototype, which passed to the Italian Air Force in 1950, was used to fly between Rome and Mogadishu until 21 February 1954, when it was damaged beyond repair by a collision with a cement truck, and was abandoned in a field in Somalia before being broken up.

It was also the first Italian transatlantic aircraft, and the first aircraft to fly into the new Malpensa airport in 1948.

== Variants ==
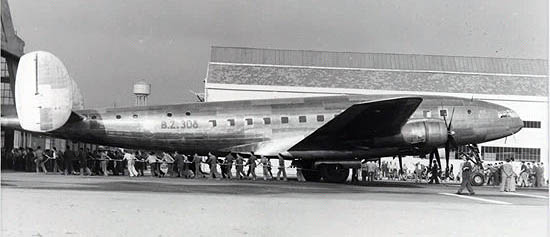
The Breda-Zappata B.Z.308

B.Z.308
The base variant of the aircraft; a single prototype was constructed.

B.Z.308bis
A pressurized variant of the BZ.308; this design never left the drawing board due to its complexity and Breda's financial difficulties.

B.Z.408
A proposed floatplane variant of the BZ.308. Unlike most heavy seaplanes of the time, the BZ.408 did not have a seaplane hull, but rather a conventional fuselage with two underwing floats. Filippo Zappata already had experience with such aircraft designs from his work on the CANT Z.511. This earlier project had considerable influence on the BZ.408 design.

== Operators ==
Italy

- Italian Air Force

== Specifications (B.Z.308) ==
Data from Jane's All The World's Aircraft 1951–52

General characteristics

- Crew: five (two pilots, flight engineer, navigator and radio operator)
- Capacity: 54 passengers
- Length: 33.52 m (110 ft 0 in)
- Wingspan: 42.1 m (138 ft 1 in)
- Height: 7.15 m (23 ft 5 in)
- Wing area: 208 m^{2} (2,240 sq ft)
- Aspect ratio: 8.55:1
- Empty weight: 27,500 kg (60,627 lb)
- Max takeoff weight: 46,500 kg (102,515 lb)
- Fuel capacity: 18,000 L (4,800 US gal; 4,000 imp gal)
- Powerplant: 4 × Bristol Centaurus 568 18-cylinder air-cooled radial engines, 1,900 kW (2,500 hp) each

Performance

- Maximum speed: 573 km/h (356 mph, 309 kn)
- Cruise speed: 441 km/h (274 mph, 238 kn) at 4,300 m (14,100 ft)
- Stall speed: 135 km/h (84 mph, 73 kn)
- Range: 7,700 km (4,800 mi, 4,200 nmi)
- Service ceiling: 8,000 m (26,000 ft)

== Appearances in media ==
The aircraft is briefly featured in the 1953 film Roman Holiday which was Audrey Hepburn's Hollywood debut.

== See also ==
- Filippo Zappata

== Sources ==
- Bridgman, Leonard (1951). Jane's All The World's Aircraft 1951–52. London: Sampson Low, Marston & Company, Ltd.
- The Illustrated Encyclopedia of Aircraft (Part Work 1982–1985). Orbis Publishing.
