= RAS-1 Getta =

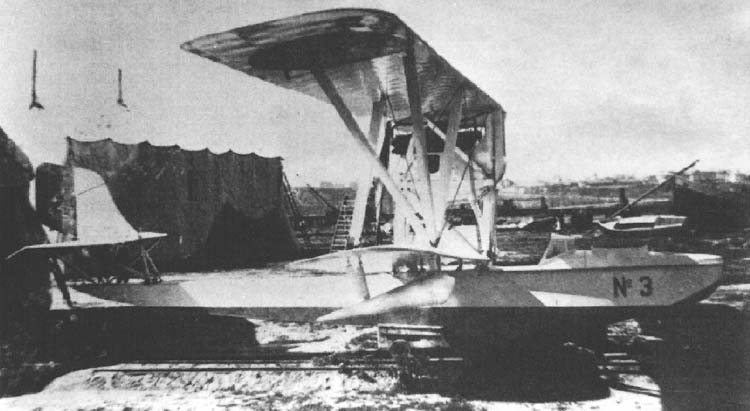
- The third flying boat after completion

General information
- Type: Training flying boat
- Manufacturer: STC
- Designer: Radu Stoika
- Primary user: Romanian Naval Aviation
- Number built: 4

History
- First flight: 17 August 1925

The RAS-1 Getta was a flying boat produced in Romania during the 1920s. Following the Getta's successful maiden flight on 17 August 1925, the Romanian government ordered three more machines.

== Design and development ==
The RAS-1 was conceived in 1923 and designed by the young Romanian engineer Radu A. Stoika (age 23 at the time) for the Societatea de Transport Comercial (S.T.C.). The design was a three-seat sesquiplane featuring a central hull, specifically adapted for the wave characteristics of the Black Sea, described as having short, concave waves.

To simplify the aircraft's construction and minimize its weight, Stoika's design omitted traditional landing gear, making it exclusively water-operational. The fundamental design adhered to basic principles of a floating body integrated with wings and a propulsion system intended to meet rudimentary flight requirements.

The seaplane was constructed in sub-assemblies at the S.T.C. workshops located on Str. Grivița no. 44 in Constanța. This workshop was described as a modest facility, more akin to a carpentry workshop than a modern aircraft factory. The construction and assembly process were largely manual ("manufactured"), lacking the infrastructure for serial production, such as dedicated halls, machinery, and a specialized workforce. The sub-assembled components were then transported to a makeshift assembly area in the port of Constanța, specifically dock 35 in the "Titan" basin. This assembly site featured a wooden scaffolding, a launch ramp, and a short section of Decauville rails (24 meters), all established through S.T.C.'s efforts. The final assembly in the port was characterized by basic conditions, resembling a small, ad-hoc construction site.

The prototype of the "Getta" was powered by a reconditioned 200 HP Hiero 6 engine, which was salvaged from World War I war trophies. The subsequent three aircraft utilized Austro-Daimler engines producing 220 HP, also sourced from captured Hansa-Brandenburg W.12 seaplanes. The selection and availability of these repurposed engines were noted as limitations from a performance and logistical standpoint.

The design, while innovative for its time and context, faced inherent limitations. The lack of robust manufacturing facilities, reliance on repurposed and underpowered engines, and the absence of landing gear restricted its operational capabilities and scalability for military applications. The construction quality was also described as rudimentary, utilizing materials like plywood, canvas, and structural elements of questionable durability. Furthermore, the design lacked features crucial for effective military use, such as advanced flight instruments for open sea operations and efficient communication systems.

== Operators ==
Romania

- Royal Romanian Naval Aviation

== Specifications ==
RAS-1 Getta, 3-side view

Data from Romanian Aeronautical Constructions 1905-1974; Airwar.ru

General characteristics

- Crew: 3
- Length: 10.5 m (34 ft 5 in)
- Wingspan: 16 m (52 ft 6 in)
- Height: 3.5 m (11 ft 6 in)
- Wing area: 50 m^{2} (540 sq ft)
- Empty weight: 1,260 kg (2,778 lb)
- Max takeoff weight: 2,045 kg (4,508 lb)
- Powerplant: 1 × Hiero 6 6-cyl water-cooled engine, 160 kW (220 hp) mounted in tandem

Performance

- Maximum speed: 160 km/h (99 mph, 86 kn)
- Cruise speed: 140 km/h (87 mph, 76 kn)
- Endurance: 8 hours
- Service ceiling: 4,000 m (13,000 ft)

== See also ==
Aircraft of comparable role, configuration, and era

- Savoia-Marchetti S.59

== Bibliography ==
- Craciunoiu, Cristian (March 2001). "L'hydravion RAS Getta, un éphémère projet roumain..." [The RAS Getta Seaplane, An Ephemeral Romanian Project]. Avions: Toute l'Aéronautique et son histoire (in French) (96): 31–35. ISSN 1243-8650.
- Crăciunoiu, Cristian; Iliescu, Liviu (1993). Înmormântarea unui proiect românesc: GETTA [Burial of a romanian project: GETTA] (in Romanian). Bucharest: Editura Modelism. ISBN 973-810-1069.
