= Caproni Ca.120 =

1930s Italian aircraft

- Caproni Ca. 120

General information
- Type: Bomber
- National origin: Italy
- Manufacturer: Società Italiana Caproni
- Number built: 1

History
- First flight: 1933

The Caproni Ca.120 was a three-engine monoplane bomber built by Caproni in the 1930s.

== Design ==
The Ca.120 was a trimotor monoplane with a cantilevered high-wing configuration made of wood with two side members, equipped with compensated flaps and ailerons. The fuel tanks were placed between the two wing members. The wing lining was in plywood on the leading edge and in canvas for the remaining part. The fuselage, on the other hand, was made of welded steel tubes and presented the seat of the two pilots side by side on the leading edge of the wings. In addition, the wide fuselage behind the cockpit allowed a wide stowage of materials. The pointer was placed in front of a large glazed window under the seats of the two pilots. The central engine was placed at the front of the fuselage, which ended with adjustable tail empennage. The two wheels equipped with brakes were placed on amortized carriages placed under the side engines that were fixed to the wings at the front. The carriages were single axle with elastic strut and bracing on the main nodes of the fuselage. The rear wheel was amortized and adjustable.

== Specifications ==
Data from , Aeroplani Caproni dal 1908 al 1935

General characteristics

- Crew: Two
- Length: 16.85 m (55 ft 3 in)
- Wingspan: 27.80 m (91 ft 2 in)
- Height: 4.75 m (15 ft 7 in)
- Wing area: 92.36 m^{2} (994.2 sq ft)
- Empty weight: 6,000 kg (13,228 lb)
- Gross weight: 9,500 kg (20,944 lb)
- Powerplant: 3 × Isotta Fraschini Asso XI R.C. V-12 water-cooled piston engine, 560 kW (750 hp) each
- Propellers: 3-bladed variable-pitch metal propellers

Performance

- Maximum speed: 360 km/h (220 mph, 190 kn) at sea level
- Cruise speed: 320 km/h (200 mph, 170 kn)
- Stall speed: 100 km/h (62 mph, 54 kn)
- Range: 1,000 km (620 mi, 540 nmi)
- Service ceiling: 7,000 m (23,000 ft)
- Time to altitude: 6,000 m (20,000 ft) in 30 minutes

Armament

- Guns: 3 × 7.7 mm (0.303 in) machine guns
- Bombs: 1,000 kg (2,200 lb) of bombs
