= Savoia-Marchetti SM.62 =

Italian single-engine maritime patrol flying boat

SM.62
- SM.62 bis

General information
- Type: Reconnaissance flying boat
- Manufacturer: Savoia-Marchetti

History
- First flight: 1926

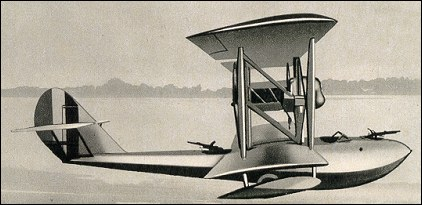

The Savoia-Marchetti SM.62 was an Italian single-engine maritime patrol flying boat produced from 1926. It served with the Regia Aeronautica and with a number of foreign users, and was produced in Spain and the Soviet Union. Some of the Spanish aircraft were still in service during the Spanish Civil War.

== Design and development ==
The SM.62 flying boat was one of the main successes of Savoia-Marchetti, evolved from the SM.59 which first flew in 1925.

The single-engine, single-spar wing, wooden biplane aircraft was powered by a single Isotta Fraschini Asso 500 R.I., 373 kW (500 hp) engine mounted between the upper and the lower wings, and drove a pusher propeller. It had a wingspan of 15.5 m (51 ft), a maximum takeoff weight of 3,000 kg (6,600 lb) including fuel, bombs and four crew, and entered production in 1926.

Apart from the two machine guns in the aft and forward fuselage, both mounted in uncovered positions, the possibility of fitting an Oerlikon 20 mm cannon was explored, but never put into service.

The progress of the project was almost continuous, and the following year saw the SM.62bis development that had a more powerful engine. This aircraft, with a 16 m (52 ft) wingspan, formed the basis of the future SM.78. The new 559 kW (750 hp) Isotta Fraschini Asso 750 engine produced 50% more power, which allowed a maximum take-off weight of 4,000 kg (8,800 lb) with a maximum speed of 220 km/h (140 mph; 120 kn), while the range was 1,200 km (750 mi; 650 nmi). For those times, these were respectable performance figures for a single-engine aircraft.

The SM.62 was one of the first Italian racing- and world-record attempting aircraft, competing in the 1926 New-York to Buenos Aires air race and the 10,000 km (6,200 mi; 5,400 nmi) air race in northern Europe, in addition to setting the speed records of 190.537 km/h (118.394 mph; 102.882 kn) averaged over 500 km (310 mi; 270 nmi) in 1926 – later augmented to 194.237 km/h (120.693 mph; 104.880 kn) – and the world records flying 500 km (310 mi; 270 nmi) while carrying 500 kg (1,100 lb), and finally 100 km (60 mi) and 500 km (310 mi; 270 nmi) with 1,000 kg (2,200 lb).

This was the most successful Italian flying boat outside Italy, with at least one being acquired by Japan for its naval aviation service, several by Romania, and 40 by Spain, some of which were license-built. The USSR acquired the license to construct the SM.62bis in Taganrog plants as the MBR-4, with many examples built.

Romania also acquired the license to construct the SM.62bis, at the IAR factory in Brașov. Five such flying boats were produced in 1936.

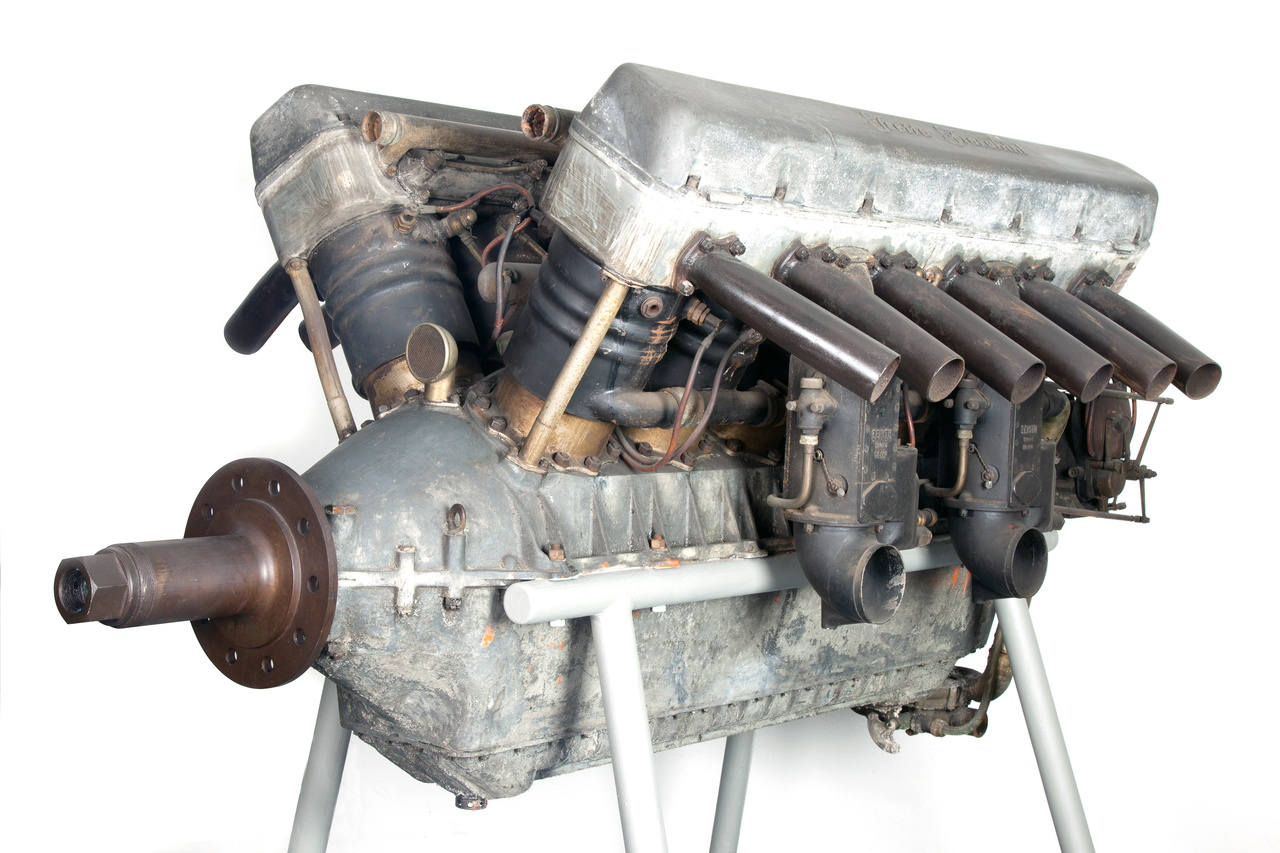
An Isotta Fraschini Asso 500 engine

Despite their obsolescence, several Spanish examples fought in the Spanish Civil War. Since the aircraft of those times were not capable of great speeds, several were used at the Desenzano "high-speed flying school" in Italy, as well as continued to serve as reconnaissance bombers. The next derivative, the SM.78, with over a ton more weight and 20% more power; could carry a greater fuel load, effectively doubling the range; and was slightly faster than the SM.62bis.

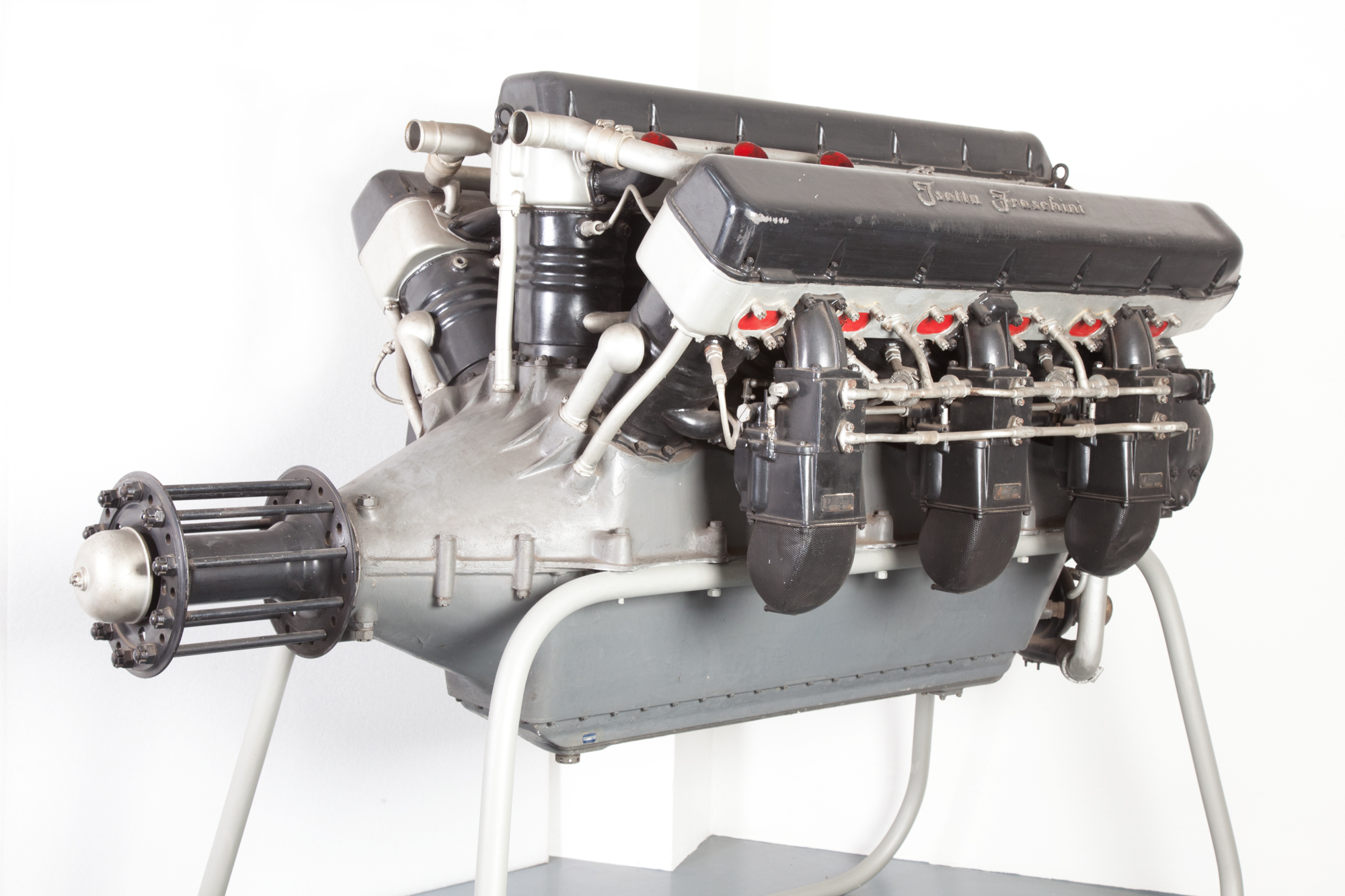
An Isotta Fraschini Asso 750 W-18 engine, as fitted to the SM.62bis

== Variants ==
SM.62
1926
SM.62P
Civil version.
SM.62bis
1927, powered by a 559 kW (750 hp) Isotta Fraschini Asso 750 W-18 engine.
SM.62ter
MBR-4
Soviet production of the SM.62bis at Taganrog

== Operators ==
Kingdom of Italy

- Regia Aeronautica
- Società Aerea Mediterranea

Japan

- Imperial Japanese Navy Air Service

Romania

- Royal Romanian Naval Aviation (11 units)

Spain

- Spanish Republican Air Force

Spain

- Spanish Air Force – Post civil war.

Soviet Union

- Aeroflot
- Soviet Naval Aviation

== Specifications (SM.62) ==
Data from Jane's all the World's Aircraft 1928, The Encyclopedia of World Aircraft

General characteristics

- Crew: 3
- Length: 11 m (36 ft 1 in)
- Wingspan: 15.5 m (50 ft 10 in)
- Height: 4.19 m (13 ft 9 in)
- Wing area: 65 m^{2} (700 sq ft)
- Empty weight: 1,900 kg (4,189 lb)
- Gross weight: 3,000 kg (6,614 lb)
- Disposable load: 1,500 kg (3,300 lb)
- Powerplant: 1 × Isotta Fraschini Asso 500 V-12 water-cooled piston engine, 370 kW (500 hp)
- Propellers: 4-bladed fixed-pitch pusher propeller

Performance

- Maximum speed: 200 km/h (120 mph, 110 kn)
- Stall speed: 85 km/h (53 mph, 46 kn)
- Service ceiling: 4,200 m (13,800 ft)
- Time to altitude: 3,000 m (9,800 ft) in 24 minutes
- Wing loading: 46.15 kg/m^{2} (9.45 lb/sq ft)
- Power/mass: 0.125 kW/kg (0.076 hp/lb)

Armament

- Guns: 4 × 7.7 mm (0.30 in) calibre machine guns, two each in the nose and midships gunners cockpits
- Bombs: 600 kg (1,300 lb) of bombs.

== See also ==
Related development

- Savoia-Marchetti S.59

Related lists

- List of aircraft of the Spanish Republican Air Force
- List of Interwar military aircraft
- List of flying boats and floatplanes

== Bibliography ==
- Axworthy, Mark (September–October 1999). "Flank Guard: Romania's Advance on Stalingrad, Part Two". Air Enthusiast. No. 65. pp. 72–75. ISSN 0143-5450.
- "Ptali Jste Se". Letectví + Kosmonautika (in Czech). No. 20. 1995. p. 1635. ISSN 0024-1156.
- Stroud, John (1966). European Transport Aircraft since 1910. London: Putnam.
