= Heinkel He 42 =

Type of aircraft

He 42
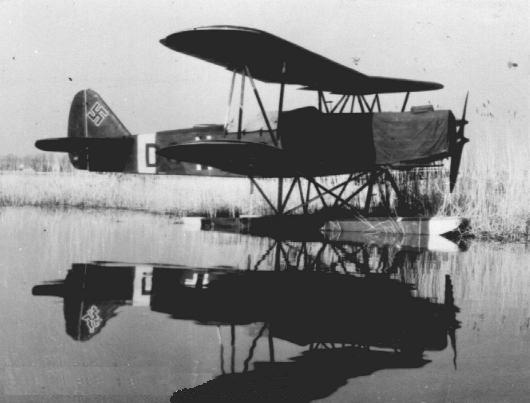
- A He 42 seaplane, used for training on the Black Sea, in 1942

General information
- Type: Maritime trainer
- Manufacturer: Heinkel
- Primary user: Luftwaffe

History
- First flight: 1929

The Heinkel HD 42 50, later designated the Heinkel He 42 was a German two-seat biplane seaplane originally designed for the Deutsche Verkehrsfliegerschule, and later built for the German Luftwaffe. The aircraft was used until the end of World War II as a trainer for maritime pilots.

== Design and development ==
In 1929, Heinkel developed a biplane, the HD 42, for use with the covert military-training organization Deutsche Verkehrsfliegerschule (DVS). Its fuselage was constructed out of a welded steel tube truss and had a rectangular cross-section with a rounded top. The engine covers were made out of light-weight metal, while the rest of the fuselage was covered in fabric. The aircraft was equipped with floats.

The HD 42 model received good feedback from the Swedish Navy, who had purchased the aircraft, as well as from the famous pilot Gunther Plüschow (who was the first airman to fly over the Patagonian mountains of Chile and Argentina at Tierra del Fuego). The prototype was equipped with a BMW Va engine, but the later versions came with a Junkers L5G engine.

Ten aircraft had been manufactured by 1932, when a new version, the He 42C was rolled out. Series production began with the He 42D model (14 manufactured) which were intended for the German Air Force, which at the time was illegal. A further 189 He 42Es were built in 1934 and these aircraft were used by various flying schools until the end of World War II

== Variants ==
HD 42
Prototype aircraft
He 42C
He 42D
First series produced model, 14 built
He 42E
Second series produced model, 189 built

== Operators ==
Bulgaria

- Bulgarian Air Force

Germany

- Luftwaffe

Sweden

- Swedish Air Force

Romania

- Royal Romanian Naval Aviation

== Specifications (He 42C-2) ==
Data from Die Deutsche Luftrüstung 1933–1945 Vol.2 – Flugzeugtypen Erla-Heinkel

General characteristics

- Crew: 2
- Length: 10.6 m (34 ft 9 in)
- Wingspan: 14 m (45 ft 11 in)
- Height: 4.3 m (14 ft 1 in)
- Wing area: 56.03 m^{2} (603.1 sq ft)
- Empty weight: 1,710 kg (3,770 lb)
- Gross weight: 2,420 kg (5,335 lb)
- Fuel capacity: 425 L (112 US gal; 93 imp gal)
- Powerplant: 1 × Junkers L5Ga 6-cylinder liquid-cooled in-line piston engine 380 PS (370 hp; 280 kW)
- Propellers: 2-bladed fixed-pitch wooden propeller, 3 m (9 ft 10 in) diameter

Performance

- Maximum speed: 192 km/h (119 mph, 104 kn) at 1,000 m (3,300 ft)
- Cruise speed: 185 km/h (115 mph, 100 kn) *Alighting speed: 80 km/h (50 mph; 43 kn)
- Range: 800 km (500 mi, 430 nmi)
- Service ceiling: 4,200 m (13,800 ft)
- Time to altitude: 1,000 m (3,300 ft) in 5 minutes 36 seconds

== See also ==
Related lists

- List of aircraft of World War II
- List of military aircraft of Germany
