= Agusta AZ.8L =

1958 Italian airliner prototype with 4 piston engines

AZ-8L
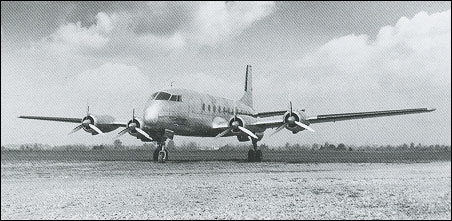
- The sole prototype of the AZ-8L

General information
- Type: Airliner
- Manufacturer: Agusta
- Designer: Filippo Zappata
- Number built: 1

History
- First flight: 9 June 1958
- Retired: 1963

The Agusta AZ.8L, or Agusta-Zappata AZ.8L, was an Italian airliner prototype first flown on 9 June 1958. It was of conventional low-wing monoplane configuration with tricycle undercarriage and all-metal construction. Filippo Zappata's design grew out of a twin-engined transport designated AZ.1 that was never built.

When the AZ.8L failed to attract customers, Agusta abandoned the project to focus on its helicopter manufacturing operations, in particular a new Zappata design, the A.101.

== Operators ==
Italy

- Italian Air Force

== Specifications ==
Data from Jane's All the World's Aircraft 1958-59.

General characteristics

- Crew: 2
- Capacity: 22 first-class or 26 economy-class passengers / 2,835 kg (6,250 lb) payload
- Length: 19.44 m (63 ft 9 in)
- Wingspan: 25.5 m (83 ft 8 in)
- Height: 6.66 m (21 ft 10 in)
- Wing area: 66.8 m^{2} (719 sq ft)
- Empty weight: 7,620 kg (16,799 lb) equipped
- Maximum zero-fuel weight: 10,300 kg (22,708 lb)
- Maximum landing weight: 10,800 kg (23,810 lb)
- Max takeoff weight: 11,300 kg (24,912 lb)
- Fuel capacity: 3,200 L (845 US gal; 704 imp gal) with 4x 45 L (12 US gal; 10 imp gal) engine oil tanks
- Powerplant: 4 × Alvis Leonides 503/2 9 cyl. air-cooled radial piston engines, 400 kW (540 hp) each for take-off

350.5 kW (470 hp) maximum continuous power

- Propellers: 3-bladed de Havilland, 2.74 m (9 ft 0 in) diameter constant-speed fully-feathering propellers

Performance

- Maximum speed: 427 km/h (265 mph, 231 kn)
- Cruise speed: 405 km/h (252 mph, 219 kn) max. continuous power at 3,000 m (9,800 ft)

370 km/h (230 mph; 200 kn) recommended power at 3,000 m (9,800 ft)

- Range: 2,500 km (1,600 mi, 1,300 nmi) with 1,470 kg (3,241 lb) payload plus reserve fuel

650 km (404 mi) with max payload and no reserve fuel

- Service ceiling: 7,500 m (24,600 ft)
- Rate of climb: 5 m/s (980 ft/min) at sea level with flaps up
- Take-off distance to 15 m (50 ft): 590 m (1,940 ft)
- Landing distance from 15 m (50 ft): 840 m (2,760 ft)

== See also ==
Aircraft of comparable role, configuration, and era

- Handley Page Herald
