= Piaggio P.50 =

Type of aircraft

P.50
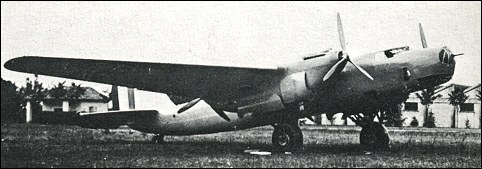
- One of the two P.50-I prototypes

General information
- Type: Heavy bomber
- National origin: Italy
- Manufacturer: Piaggio
- Designer: Giovanni Casiraghi
- Number built: P.50-I: 2 P.50-II: 1

History
- First flight: P.50-I: 1937; P-50-II: 1938

The Piaggio P.50 was an Italian prototype heavy bomber designed and built by Piaggio for the Regia Aeronautica (Italian Royal Air Force).

== Design and development ==
The P.50 was the first design by Giovanni Casiraghi—following an outline for the project laid out by Piaggio designer Ing Giovanni Pegna—for the Piaggio company.

=== P.50-I ===
The first model, the P.50-I, was a four-engine shoulder-wing monoplane with a single large tailfin and rudder. It was powered by four 544-kilowatt (730-horsepower) Isotta-Fraschini Asso XI.RC V12 engines mounted in tandem pairs on the wings, with each engine driving one three-bladed propeller; two of the propellers were mounted in a pusher and two in a tractor configuration. For defense, the P.50-I had three machine gun positions, including a nose turret

Piaggio built two P.50-I prototypes, the first of which—MM369—flew in 1937. The second—MM370—was damaged in an accident while landing at Malpensa airfield in 1938.

No production order for the P.50-I materialized.

=== P.50-II ===
A new model of the P.50, the P.50-II, appeared in 1938. It was re-engined with four 746-kilowatt (1,001-horsepower) Piaggio P.XI RC.40 radial engines, each driving a three-bladed propeller, dispensing with the tandem-engine, pusher-puller configuration of the P.50-I, instead mounting the engines separately with all four propellers as tractors. Its defensive armament was upgraded to five 12.7-millimeter (0.5-inch) machine guns.

Piaggio produced a single P.50-II prototype designated MM371. No production ordered resulted for the P.50-II, but Piaggio later applied the experience it gained from the design and construction of the three P.50 prototypes to the development of the Piaggio P.108 heavy bomber of World War II.

== Variants ==
P-50-I
Four-engines in tandem push-pull nacelles - two built.
P-50-II
A single more powerful P.50 with four engines in separate tractor nacelles

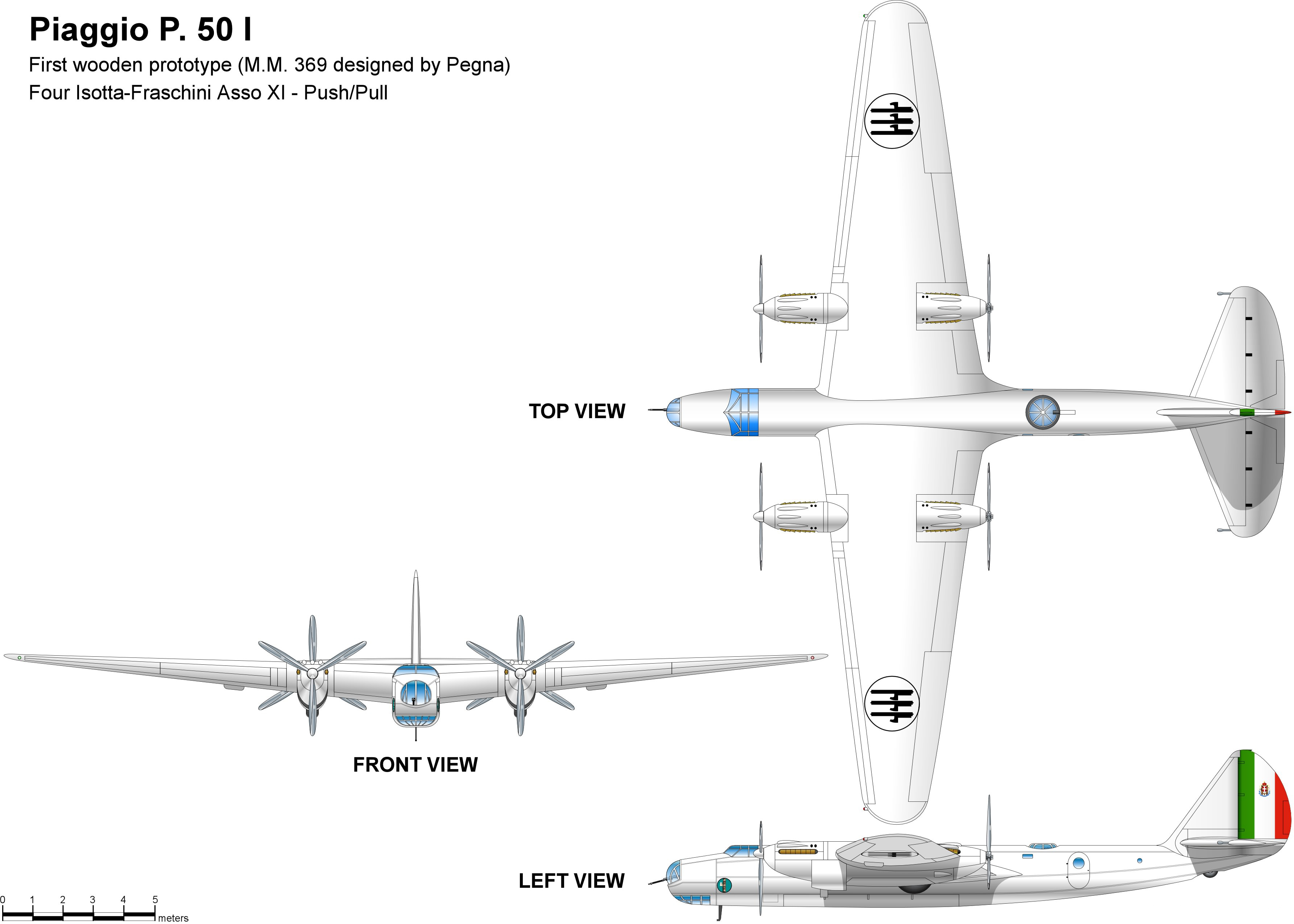
P 50 first version, four liquid-cooled engines in two nacelles

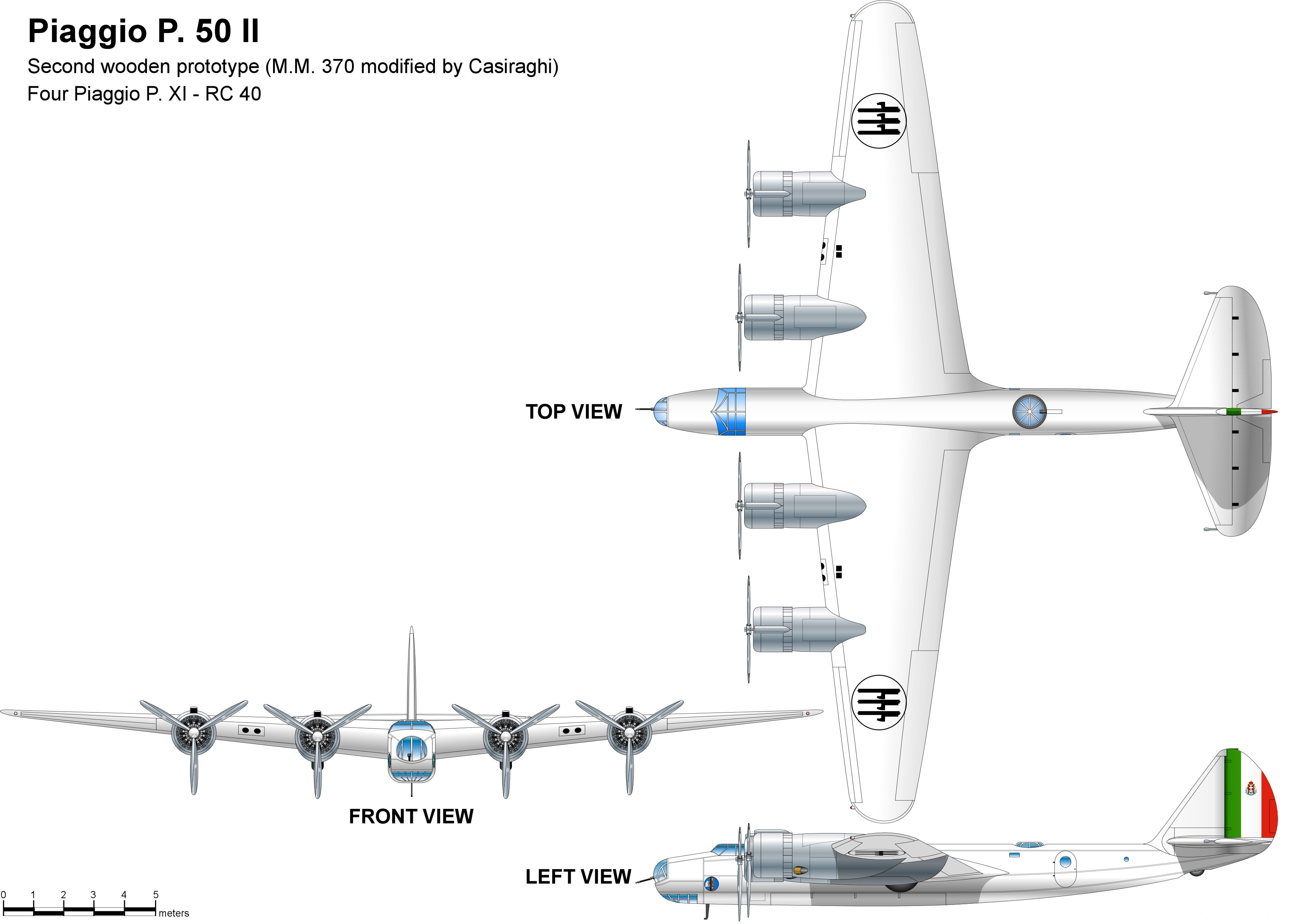
P 50 second version, four air-cooled engines in four nacelles

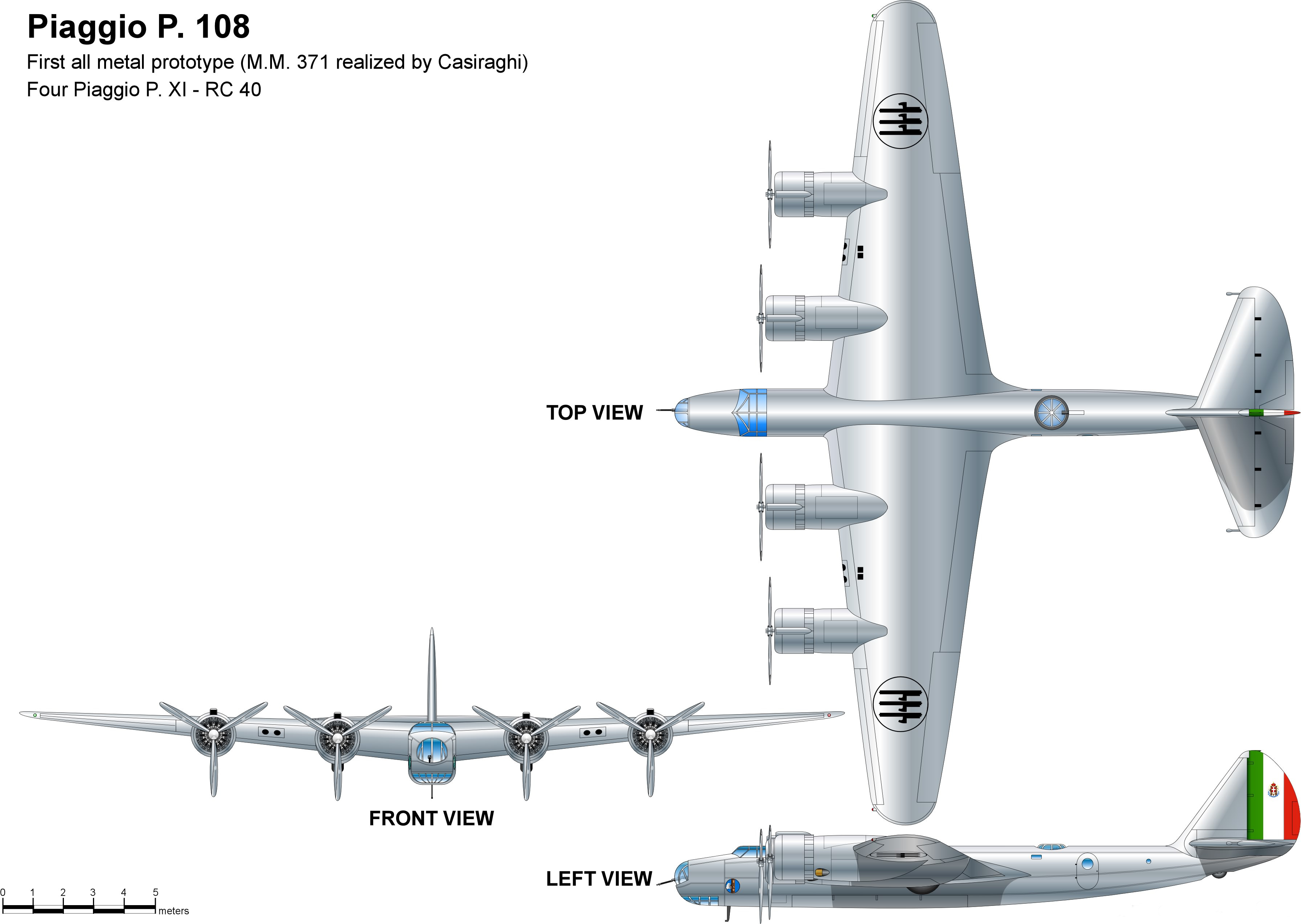
P 50 metallic version, Casiraghi designed it like a P 108B forerunner

== Operators ==
Kingdom of Italy

- Regia Aeronautica

== Specifications (P.50-I) ==
Data from Italian Civil and Military Aircraft 1930–1945

General characteristics

- Length: 19.81 m (65 ft 0 in)
- Wingspan: 25.794 m (84 ft 7 1/2 in)
- Height: 4.75 m (15 ft 7 in)
- Wing area: 100.00 m^{2} (1,076.4 sq ft)
- Empty weight: 12,973 kg (28,600 lb)
- Gross weight: 19,958 kg (44,000 lb)
- Powerplant: 4 × Isotta-Fraschini Asso XI.RC liquid-cooled V12 engine, 540 kW (730 hp) each

Performance

- Maximum speed: 430 km/h (270 mph, 230 kn)
- Range: 2,998 km (1,863 mi, 1,619 nmi)
- Time to altitude: 22 min to 13,120 ft (4,000 m)

Armament

- Guns: 3× 12.7 mm machine guns
- Bombs: 2,500 kg (5,500 lb) bombs
