= Isotta Fraschini Asso XI =

Family of water-cooled, supercharged V12 piston aeroengines

Asso XI
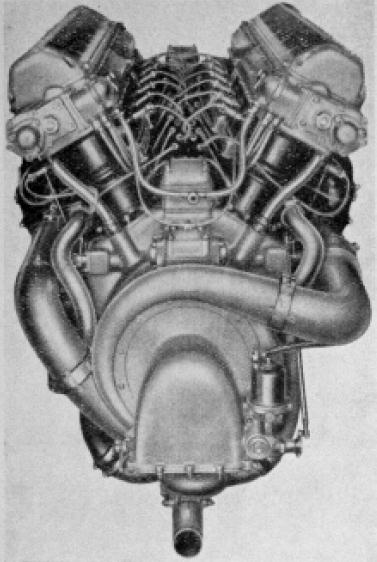
- Type: V-12 water-cooled piston aircraft engine
- National origin: Italy
- Manufacturer: Isotta Fraschini, Milan
- First run: early 1930s
- Major applications: CANT Z.501, CANT Z.1007

The Asso XI was a family of water-cooled, supercharged V12 piston aeroengines produced in the 1930s by Italian manufacturer Isotta Fraschini, and fitted to a number of aircraft types built by CANT, Caproni and others.

== Design and development ==
Isotta Fraschini produced a long series of engines with the name Asso (Ace in English). The Asso XI R.C. was a liquid-cooled V-12 engine with maximum power output in the range 670–725 kW (898–972 hp) depending on the degree of supercharging. There were two variants, differing only in their supercharger speed: the R.C.40 ran at a little over 10 times the crankshaft speed and enabled the engine to maintain a rated power of 623 kW (835 hp) to an altitude of 4,000 m (13,000 ft) whereas the R.2C.15 held 655 kW (878 hp) to 1,500 m (4,900 ft) with a supercharger gearing of 7.

All variants of the R.C.40 had much in common with construction of the earlier Asso 750 R.C., though they had two, rather than three, banks of 6 cylinders and 4 rather than 2 valves per cylinder. The cylinder barrels were machined from carbon steel with flat-topped heads and valve seats. Each barrel had a separate sheet steel water jacket. Cast aluminium head blocks were bolted to each of the two banks of cylinders, providing valve ports, guides, coolant passages and camshaft supports. The pistons were also aluminium castings. The crankshaft was a 6-throw design with 8 plain bearings and a double row ball thrust bearing between the front two. The connecting rods had bronze bush little ends and white metal big ends. The crankcase was cast in two parts, the upper one with the housings for the crankshaft bearings.

== Variants ==
Asso XI R
(R - Riduttore - reduction gear)
Asso XI R.C.
(C - Compressore - supercharged)
Asso XI R.C.15
Supercharger speed 75/7 times crankshaft; rated power at 1,500 m (4,900 ft).
Asso XI R.2C.15
(2C - second supercharger gearing) Supercharger speed 7 times crankshaft; rated power at 1,500 m (4,900 ft).
Asso XI R.2C.16
(2C - second supercharger gearing) Supercharger speed 7 times crankshaft; rated power at 1,600 m (5,200 ft).
Asso XI R.C.40
Supercharger speed 75/7 times crankshaft; rated power at 4,000 m (13,000 ft).
L.121 R.C.40
A version of the Asso XI, 671 kW (900 hp)
A.120 R.C.40
Inverted version of the L.121

== Applications ==
- CANT Z.501
- CANT Z.505
- CANT Z.508
- CANT Z.1007
- CANT Z.1011
- Caproni Ca.124 idro
- Caproni Ca.134
- Caproni Ca.135
- Caproni Ca.405
- Caproni Campini N.1
- IMAM Ro.45
- Piaggio P.32
- Piaggio P.50
- SAI Ambrosini S.S.4
- Savoia-Marchetti SM.79 (originally)

== Specifications (R.C.40) ==
Data from Jane's All the World's Aircraft 1938

=== General characteristics ===
- Type: 12-cylinder supercharged water-cooled 60° V-12 piston aircraft engine
- Bore: 146 mm (5.75 in)
- Stroke: 160 mm (6.30 in)
- Displacement: 32.65 L (1,992 cu in) (Note: Calculating from the bore and stroke given in the engine specifications results in a displacement different to that provided by the referenced source, that is: Displacement: 32.14 L (1,961 cu in))
- Length: 2,128 mm (83.78 in)
- Width: 834 mm (32.83 in)
- Height: 1,106 mm (43.54 in)
- Dry weight: 594 kg (1,310 lb)

=== Components ===
- Valvetrain: two intake and two exhaust valves per cylinder, driven via cams and T-shaped tappets from inlet and exhaust pairs of overhead camshafts geared together, one for each bank of six cylinders, each pair driven by its own shaft connected indirectly to the crankshaft bevel gear.
- Supercharger: single speed, single stage centrifugal, running at 10.714 times crankshaft speed.
- Fuel system: four Isotta Fraschini L.70C updraft carburreters, two for each bank of six cylinders.
- Oil system: dry sump with single pressure and scavenge pump shaft driven off crankshaft bevel gear.
- Cooling system: water-cooled, pump shaft driven off crankshaft bevel gear.
- Reduction gear: 0.743 or 0.512
- compressed air starter

=== Performance ===
- Power output: rated power 623 kW (835 hp) at 2,250 rpm at 4,000 m (13,000 ft); take off power 596 kW (799 hp) at 2,250 rpm
- Specific power: 19.1 kW/L (0.42 hp/cu in) (at rated power)
- Compression ratio: 6.4:1
- Fuel consumption: 194 kg/h (430 lb/h) (at rated power)
- Specific fuel consumption: 0.312 kg/kWh (0.513 lb/(hp⋅h))
- Oil consumption: 0.08 kg/kWh (0.13 lb/(hp⋅h)) (cruise)
- Power-to-weight ratio: 1.05 kW/kg (0.64 hp/lb)

== See also ==
Related lists

- List of aircraft engines
