= Blériot 290 =

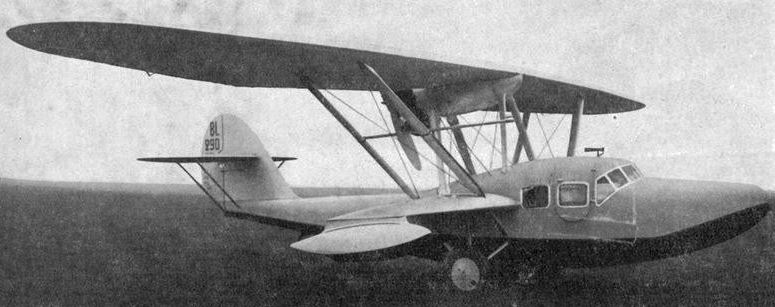

General information
- Type: light amphibian flying-boat
- National origin: France
- Manufacturer: Blériot
- Designer: Filippo Zappata
- Number built: 1

History
- First flight: 1931

The Blériot 290 was a 1930s French sesquiplane flying boat designed by Filippo Zappata. One prototype was built, but it was not ordered or produced.

== Design and development ==
The 290 was designed by Zappata as a three-seat touring amphibian flying boat. It had a streamlined single-step hull and an enclosed cabin, and was powered by a Salmson 9Ab radial piston engine with a two-bladed pusher propeller. It first flew in October 1931, and as a result of tests was re-designed with a second step in the hull. The 290 was underpowered and over-priced and did not enter production. The prototype was scrapped in April 1937.

== Specifications ==
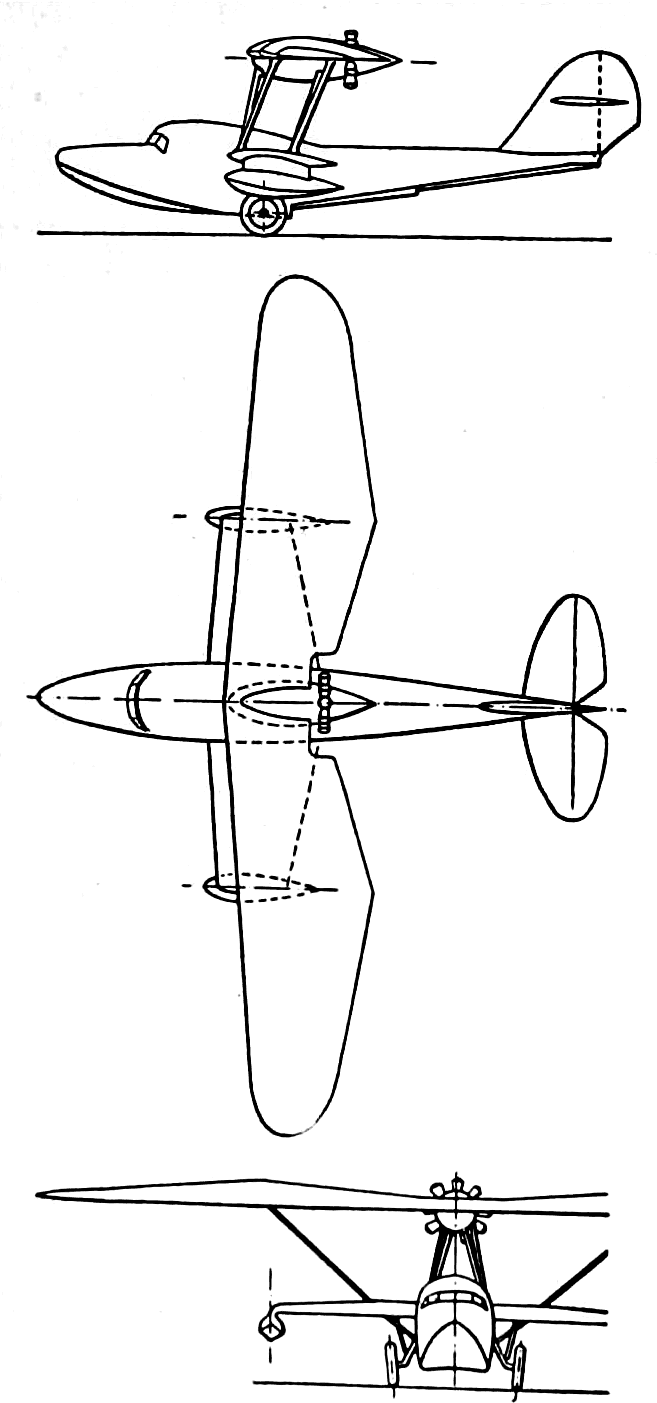
Blériot 290 3-view drawing from L'Aerophile May 1932

Data from The Illustrated Encyclopedia of Aircraft

General characteristics

- Crew: 1
- Capacity: 2 passengers
- Length: 9.98 m (32 ft 9 in)
- Wingspan: 14.60 m (47 ft 10.75 in)
- Wing area: 32.00 m^{2} (344.46 sq ft)
- Empty weight: 1,205 kg (2,656 lb)
- Gross weight: 1,698 kg (3,743 lb)
- Powerplant: 1 × Salmson 9Ab radial piston engine , 172 kW (230 hp)

Performance

- Maximum speed: 205 km/h (127 mph, 110 kn)
- Range: 650 km (404 mi, 351 nmi)
- Service ceiling: 3,700 m (12,140 ft)

== See also ==
Related lists

- List of flying boats and floatplanes
