= Caproni Ca.124 =

CA.124
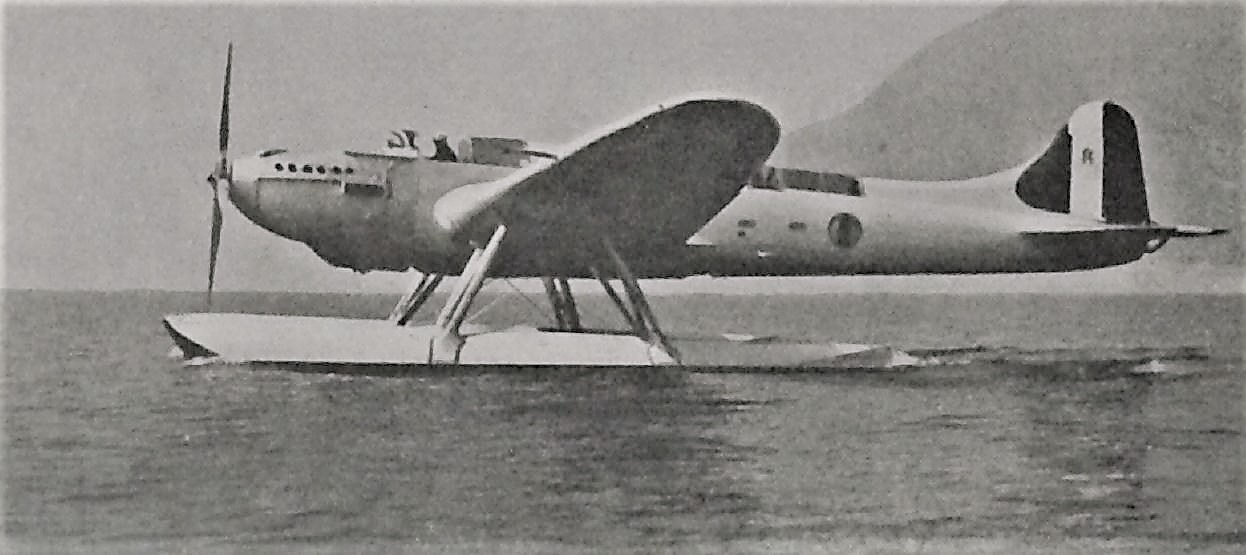

General information
- Type: Reconnaissance and bomber seaplane
- National origin: Italy
- Manufacturer: Societa Italiana Caproni
- Number built: 1?

History
- First flight: c.1937

The Caproni Ca.124 was a 1930s single-engine Italian reconnaissance and bomber seaplane.

== Design ==
The Caproni Ca.124 was a cantilever mid-wing monoplane of mixed construction. The fuselage was corrugated-skinned and the empennage cantilever and conventional, with the tailplane set at mid-fuselage. The pilot's cockpit was forward of the leading edge. It was a floatplane, mounted on metal floats each attached to the wings by pairs of N-form laterally orientated struts.

The Ca.124 was powered by a 900 hp (670 kW) Isotta Fraschini Asso XI.RC15, a water-cooled upright V-12 engine, supercharged to maintain power to 1,500 m (4,920 ft). Bombs were contained within the fuselage, below the wing.

== Specifications ==
Data from Jane's All the World's Aircraft 1938

General characteristics

- Length: 13.8 m (45 ft 3 in)
- Wingspan: 18.9 m (62 ft 0 in)
- Height: 4.6 m (15 ft 1 in)
- Powerplant: 1 × Isotta Fraschini Asso XI.RC15 V-12 upright water-cooled piston engine, supercharged
- Propellers: 3-bladed

Performance

- Maximum speed: 325 km/h (202 mph, 175 kn)
- Stall speed: 110 km/h (68 mph, 59 kn)
