= CANT Z.501 Gabbiano =

1934 maritime patrol flying boat

Z.501 Gabbiano
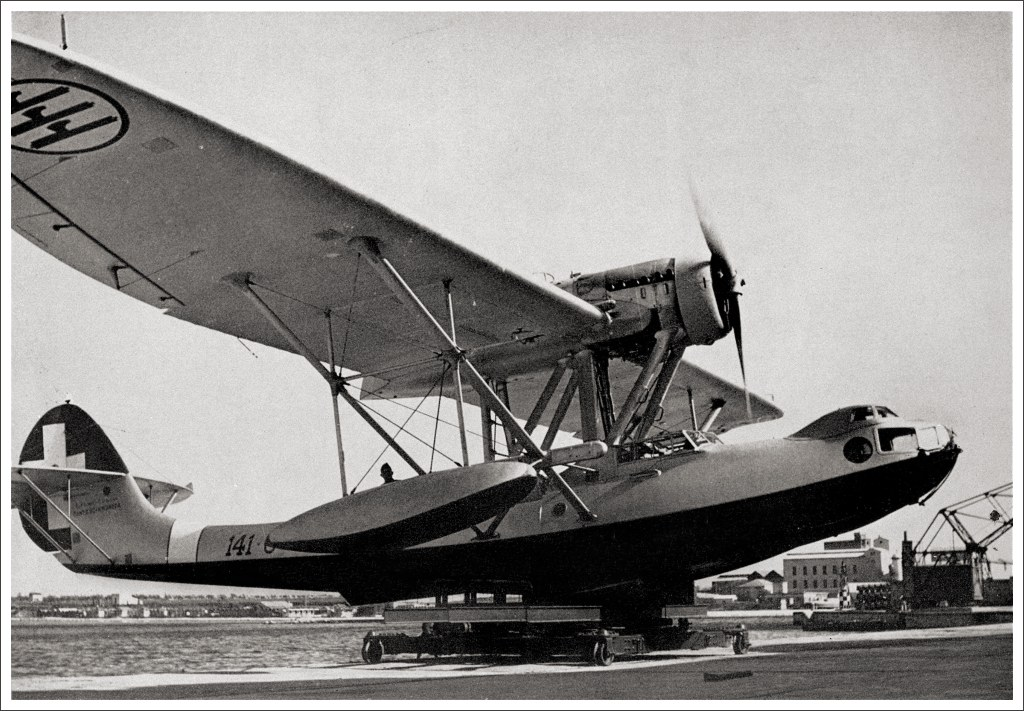
- CANT Z.501 with beaching gear. The position in the nose is closed and the pilot's cockpit is just under the propeller. The engine nacelle was also used as a machine gun position.

General information
- Type: Patrol aircraft
- Manufacturer: CANT
- Designer: Filippo Zappata
- Primary users: Regia Aeronautica Aeronautica Nazionale Repubblicana; Italian Co-Belligerent Air Force; Aeronautica Militare Italiana
- Number built: 454

History
- Manufactured: -1943
- First flight: 7 February 1934
- Retired: 1950

The CANT Z.501 Gabbiano (Italian: Gull) was a parasol wing flying boat with two outboard stabilising floats. The engine was contained in a nacelle mounted in the middle of the wing. It had a crew of 4–5 men and served with the Italian Regia Aeronautica during the Second World War as a reconnaissance aeroplane. During its debut in 1934, it set a world distance record. It was obsolete by 1940, but was still used throughout the Second World War, suffering many losses. A few remained in service until 1949.

== Development ==
Filippo Zappata was one of the foremost Italian aircraft designers. He worked for Cantieri Aeronautici e Navali Triestini (CANT) for some years, but went to France in 1927 to work for Blériot. He returned to Italy at the prompting of Italo Balbo and resumed work at CANT on a series of new aircraft. The first of these was the Z.501, designed to replace the Savoia-Marchetti S.78. The prototype Z.501 was first flown in 1934 by test pilot Mario Stoppani.

=== Design ===
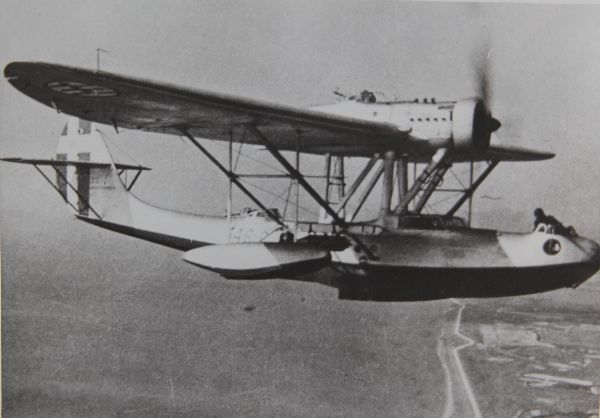
Z.501 in flight

The aircraft had a parasol wing and a wing-mounted engine nacelle. In the prototype a 560 kW (750 hp) inline Isotta Fraschini Asso-750.RC engine was fitted, with an annular (ring shaped) radiator which made the installation resemble that of a radial engine. The engine nacelle was extended aft to contain a rear-facing machine gun; other gun positions were mounted in the centre fuselage and nose. All were 7.7 mm (0.30 in) Breda-SAFAT machine guns. Bombs up to 640 kg (1,410 lb) [4 × 160 kg (350 lb)] were carried under the wings. The aerodynamic low-drag design was typical of Zappata-designed aircraft, as was the wooden construction. Production of the Z.501 began in 1935 with 24 aircraft ordered from CANT and thirty from Aeronautica Sicula, a company in Palermo. Registration numbers started with MM.35168.

== Operational history ==
=== Record flights ===
The production aircraft had an endurance of 12 hours; the record-breaking version greatly exceeded this. The USA had established a new endurance record of 3,860 km (2,400 mi); a Z.501 with the civilian registration I-AGIL was used to re-take the record in accordance with dictator Benito Mussolini's wishes. It was manned by Stoppani and two others, fitted with a special metal three-blade propeller and other modifications.

On 19–20 May 1934, the modified Z.501 established a new seaplane distance record of 4,130 km (2,570 mi) by flying from Monfalcone to Massawa in Eritrea in 26 hours and 35 minutes. This record was lost to a French aircraft which flew 4,335 km (2,694 mi) on 23 June the same year, so another record attempt was made on 16 July. The plan was to fly to Djibouti, a distance of 4,700 km (2,900 mi) but instead the aircraft flew 4,930 km (3,060 mi) to Berbera in Somaliland in 25 hours.

=== Military service ===
Z.501s were used for search-and-rescue missions and anti-submarine patrols. The Z.501 was put into service with some modifications, including; turrets for the machine guns, and some reinforcement of the airframe that increased the weight by 500 kg (1,100 lb). The more powerful 656 kW (880 hp) Isotta Fraschini Asso XI.RC engine was fitted, but even with an additional 97 kW (130 hp), the maximum speed dropped to 245 km/h (152 mph), cruise speed to 200 km/h (120 mph) and range to 2,400 km (1,500 mi).

The first units equipped were No.141 Sqn., Eritrea, No.83 Group, Augusta, No.85, Elmas, and No.62, Spain (for operations). By the time Italy entered the Second World War on 10 June 1940, 202 aircraft were in service in 15 squadrons. They were used by 20 Sqn. and patrolled the Mediterranean, as well as performing air-sea rescue operations. During the short campaign against France, seven Z.501s were destroyed by a French attack on their base in Sardinia. Another crashed the next day. In July, encounters with fighters of the Royal Navy Fleet Air Arm and accidents claimed many Z.501s, with 11 destroyed in action, while the number that were operational dropped to 77. The Z.501 operated in all theatres and 62 aircraft were lost in 1940, leaving 126, of which only 87 were operational. New orders were placed with the manufacturer Aeronautica Sicula.

At the end of 1941, there were Z.501s in 15 of the 27 squadrons dedicated to naval reconnaissance. During the year the number of operational aircraft increased to an average of 100, rising six months later to 108 in eleven squadrons.They were responsible, in collaboration with Italian ships, for the destruction of HMS Union and damaged three other submarines. They were able to carry up to four bombs; either 50 kg (110 lb) or 160 kg (350 lb) with a maximum payload of 640 kg (1,410 lb).

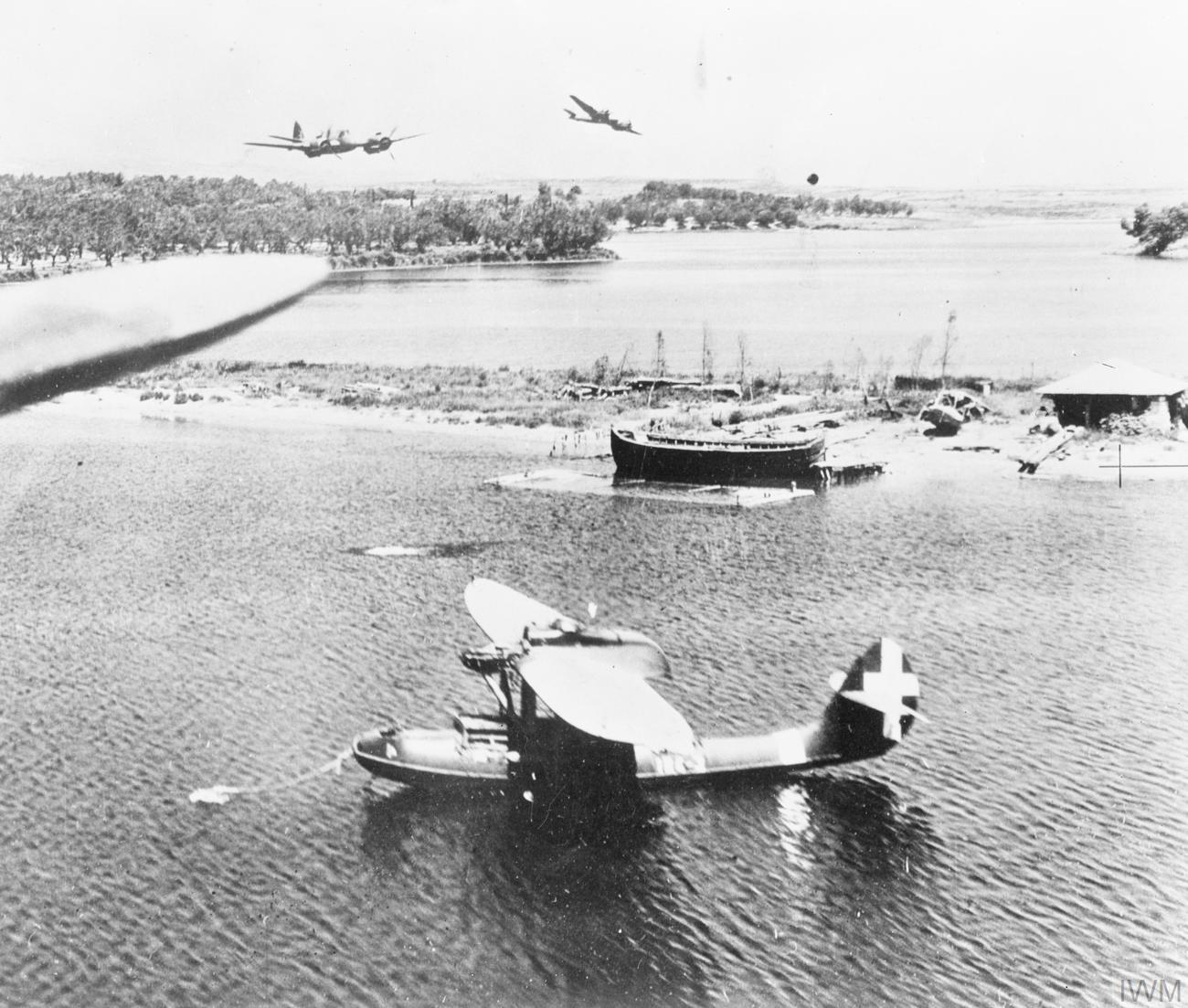
RAF Bristol Beaufighters sweep in at low level to attack the Italian seaplane base at Preveza, Greece. In the foreground is a CANT Z.501.

By the end of 1942, there were 199 aircraft in service, 88 of which were operational. Maritime reconnaissance had at that time 290 aircraft. By September 1943, there were still 240 aircraft assigned to maritime reconnaissance: only 84 were Z.501s, in three squadrons, and another 11 (mixed), out of twenty. Only around forty aircraft were operational. Total production, 218 by CANT and 236 by Aeronautica Sicula, but 12 incomplete aircraft were captured after the Operation Husky the invasion of Sicily. Later, Aeronautica Sicula repaired many of the Italian Co-Belligerent Air Force (ICAF) aircraft. Some modifications were adopted during production, such as the removal of the nose machine gun and replacing it with an enclosed fairing.

Some Z.501s were supplied to Romania and to the Nationalists during the Spanish Civil War. Following Italy's surrender in 1943, a few of these continued to be operated by both the Axis Aeronautica Nazionale Repubblicana and the Allied Italian Co-Belligerent Air Force. After the armistice, several were flown to southern Italy, including the nine aircraft of 149 Sqn with eighty persons aboard. In October, there were sixteen aircraft operational in southern Italy; this number had dropped to 10 by May 1945. The squadrons involved were Nos 141, 147, and 183. After the war 183 Sqn. was based at Elmas with four Z.501s. These were scrapped in 1950.

==== Romanian service ====
During 1941, twelve Z.501s were exported to Romania. One of these was lost during the war, shot down in the autumn of 1943 by Soviet ace Grigoriy Rechkalov. They performed well in the Black Sea, one unit managing to sink two Soviet submarines in August 1941.

== Combat performance ==
Generally, the Z.501 had a mixed reputation. It was pleasant to fly, having low wing loading and good performance (when it was first introduced). It was quite reliable despite having only one liquid-cooled engine. There were problems with the durability of the wooden fuselage, particularly the aircraft built during the war. Its seafaring qualities were poor and the aircraft was susceptible to bad weather. The fuselage would often break up in rough seas. Another problem was the engine nacelle: if the aircraft landed heavily the propeller could crash down into the cockpit.

The aircraft was used for reconnaissance thanks to its long endurance but it was vulnerable to enemy fighters or even bombers. Perhaps its only air victory was in the Aegean, when a fighter stalled while chasing a Z.501. The aircraft was more often relegated to second-line duties. Sometimes, with well-trained crews, it was able to attack submarines, damaging several of them (perhaps six in total) and contributing to the destruction of two others. The aircraft had no advanced detection systems, only depth charges.

Generally the aircraft's main task was search and rescue and perhaps because of this it was called Mammaiuto ("Mamma help me!"). Another theory is that it earned the nickname because it was helpless against enemy aircraft. Even its sea capabilities were poor, and often the Z.501 needed to be helped by ships. As for its flying qualities, it was too slow, lacked manoeuvrability, and under-armed to put up a defence against enemy fighters. As a result, many were shot down.

== Military operators ==
Kingdom of Italy

- Regia Aeronautica
- Aviazione Legionaria operated 9 aircraft
- Italian Co-Belligerent Air Force
- Aeronautica Nazionale Repubblicana

Italy

- Italian Air Force operated few aircraft until 1948

Spain

- Spanish Air Force

Romania

- Royal Romanian Naval Aviation (12 purchased in 1941)

== Specifications (Z.501) ==
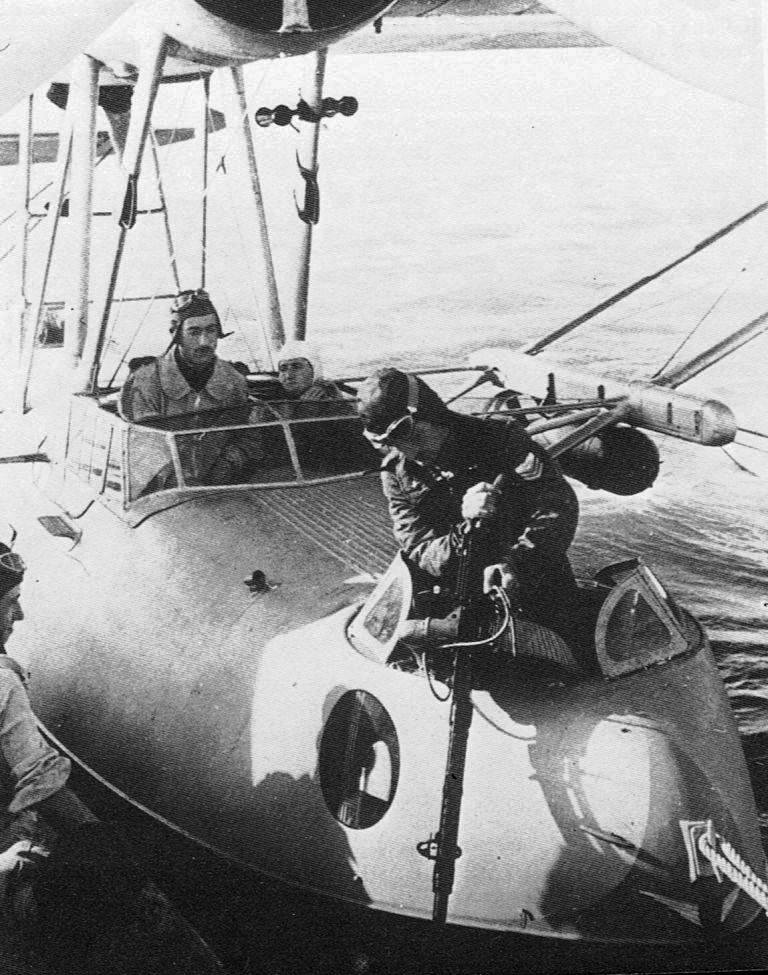
Close view of nose showing gunner and cockpit positions

Data from The Encyclopedia of Weapons of World War II Italian Civil and Military Aircraft 1930–1945

General characteristics

- Crew: 4-5
- Length: 14.3 m (46 ft 11 in)
- Wingspan: 22.5 m (73 ft 10 in)
- Height: 4.4 m (14 ft 5 in)
- Wing area: 62.00 m^{2} (667.4 sq ft)
- Empty weight: 3,850 kg (8,488 lb)
- Max takeoff weight: 7,050 kg (15,543 lb)
- Powerplant: 1 × Isotta Fraschini Asso XI R.2C.15 , 656 kW (880 hp)
- Propellers: 3-bladed metal propeller

Performance

- Maximum speed: 275 km/h (171 mph, 148 kn) at 2,499 m (8,200 ft)
- Cruise speed: 240 km/h (150 mph, 130 kn) at 1,999 m (6,560 ft)
- Range: 999 km (621 mi, 539 nmi)
- Ferry range: 2,398 km (1,490 mi, 1,295 nmi)

Armament

- Guns: 3 × 7.7 mm (0.303 in) Breda-SAFAT machine guns (initially Vickers), but many had only two when the nose position was removed
- Bombs: 640 kg (1,400 lb) carried externally

== See also ==
Aircraft of comparable role, configuration, and era

- Aichi H9A
- Beriev Be-4
- Dornier Do 18
- Fairchild 91
- Saunders-Roe A.36 Lerwick

Related lists

- List of aircraft of World War II
- List of interwar military aircraft
- List of Regia Aeronautica aircraft used in World War II
- List of flying boats and floatplanes
