= Propulsion systems of the Savoia-Marchetti SM.81 =

Savoia-Marchetti SM.81
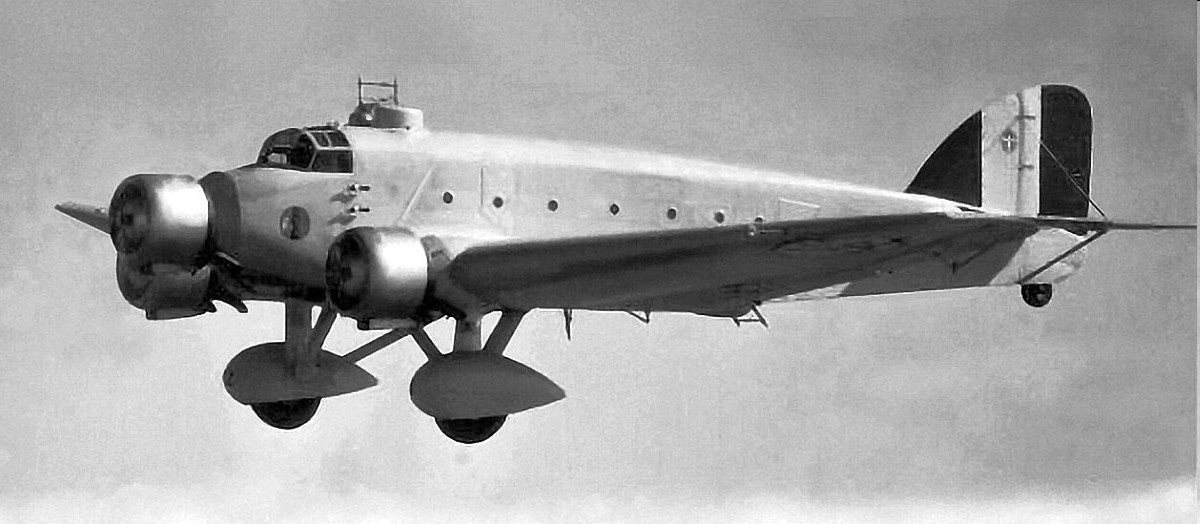
- Savoia Marchetti SM.81 in action (escorted by Fiat CR.32 fighters)

General information
- Type: Bomber and transport aircraft
- Manufacturer: Savoia-Marchetti
- Primary users: Regia Aeronautica Spanish Air Force; Aeronautica Militare
- Number built: 534

History
- Introduction date: 1935
- First flight: 1934
- Retired: 1950
- Developed from: Savoia-Marchetti S.73

The Savoia-Marchetti SM.81 was an Italian three-engine aircraft. Unlike its contemporary, the Savoia-Marchetti SM.79, it was fitted with a wide range of engines from its introduction.

== Engines ==
Standardizing engines used in individual theatres of operation was necessary. Aircraft based in Italy and Spain had Alfa 125/126 engines, those based in Libya had GR 14K's and Eastern Africa based aircraft were powered by Piaggio engines. In addition, a single prototype twin-engined aircraft (designated S.M.81B) was flown using Isotta Fraschini engines

=== Alfa Romeo 125 RC35 ===
432 kW (579 hp)−507 kW (−680 hp)
Total power: 1,298-1,521 kW (1,740-2,040 hp)

=== Gnome-Rhône 14Kc ===
485 kW (650 hp)−746 kW (−1,000 hp)
Total power: 1,455-2,237 kW (1,950-3,000 hp)

=== Piaggio P.X. RC15 ===
501 kW (672 hp)−522 kW (−700 hp)
Total power: 1,499-1,567 kW (2,010-2,100 hp)

=== Alfa Romeo 126 RC34 ===
582 kW (780 hp)−671 kW (−900 hp)
Total power: 1,746-2,014 kW (2,340-2,700 hp)

=== Piaggio P.IX RC40 ===
507 kW (680 hp)
Total power: 1,522 kW (2,041 hp)

=== Isotta Fraschini Asso IX RC ===
626 kW
Total power: 1,252 kW

== Airscrews ==
Three-bladed metal propellers were used with duralumin blades and steel hubs. They had a diameter of 3.4–3.5 m (11–11 ft).

== Fuel Tanks ==
The fuel tanks, as was standard for Italian multi-engined aircraft, were metal self-sealing fuel tanks using materials developed by SEMAPE, the specialized manufacturer. Eight tanks were fitted, with six in the centre wing (4 × 150 L/40 US gallon and 2 × 1,140 L/301 US gal tanks) and two 370 L (100 US gal) tanks (or 780 L/210 US gal with Gnome-Rhône 14K engines) in the outer wings. This gave an overall fuel capacity of 3,620 or 4,400 L (960 or 1,160 US gal).

== Performance ==
With a total of 1,305-1,752 kW (1,750-2,350 hp) the SM.81 was well served, even if individually the engines were underpowered. The maximum speed with the AR.125 engine was 340 km/h (210 mph), with others it was from 320–347 km/h (199–216 mph). Cruise speed at its best was 260 km/h (160 mph), but there were reported values of up to 330 km/h (210 mph). The extra power of many engine-sets was valuable in high and hot conditions, but their larger diameter was sometimes enough to reduce maximum speed by adding more drag. Even so, the aircraft was faster than the Junkers Ju 52, its most direct equivalent.

Even with the same or even greater fuel load than the SM.79, the SM.81 had a shorter range. It had a maximum 2,000 km (1,200 mi) endurance in normal conditions. The ferry range to Spain in 1936 was an example of the relatively short range of the aircraft, perhaps caused (as was the low speed) by drag.

Given the 3,799 kg (8,375 lb) useful load, with the maximum 2,400 kg (5,300 lb) of fuel on board, the bomb load was reduced to 1,000 kg (2,200 lb), with a range of around 600–700 km (370–430 mi), depending on the type of engines. With a full (2,000 kg; 4,400 lb) bomb load, its ferry range was only 460 km (290 mi), while its combat range was 640 km (400 mi).
