= CA-131 =

CA-131 may refer to:

- Caproni Ca.131, an experimental aircraft
- California State Route 131, a road in the US state of California
