= CA-132 =

CA-132 may refer to:

- California State Route 132, a highway in the US state of California
- Caproni Ca.132, an experimental aircraft
