= Piaggio Stella P.IX =

Italian nine-cylinder radial aircraft engine

Piaggio P.IX
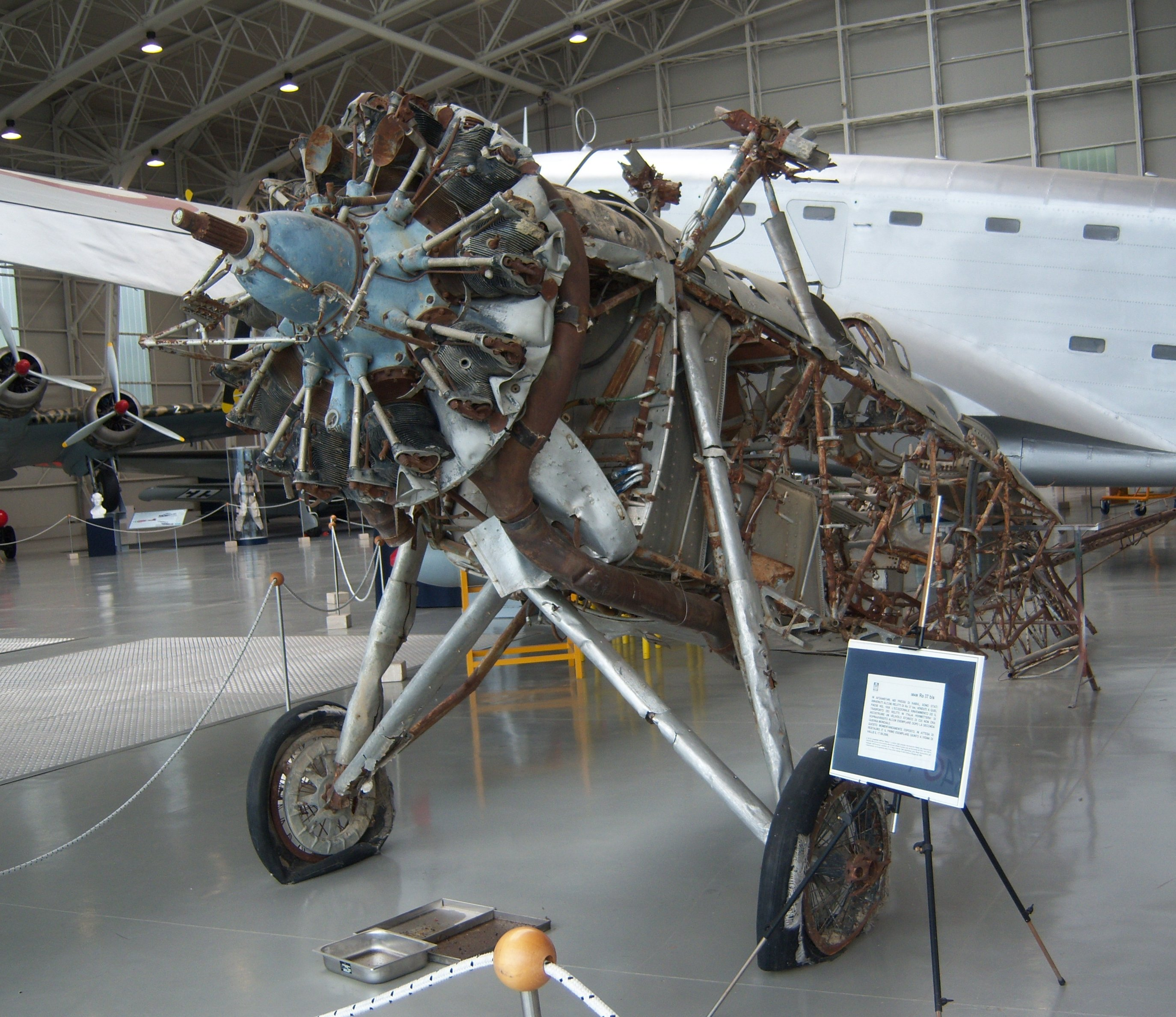
- P.IX mounted on the IMAM Ro.37 at the Italian Air Force Museum, Vigna di Valle
- Type: Air cooled radial
- National origin: Italy
- Manufacturer: Piaggio
- Designer: Renzo Spolti
- First run: 1933
- Major applications: IMAM Ro.37bis; Savoia-Marchetti SM.81
- Developed from: Gnome-Rhône 9K
- Developed into: Piaggio P.X

The Piaggio P.IX, or Piaggio Stella P.IX, was an Italian nine-cylinder radial aircraft engine produced by Rinaldo Piaggio S.p.A. Based on the Gnome-Rhône 9K, the engine was rated at 600 hp (447 kW). Production was used to power a number of other aircraft developed in Italy. The main users were the Savoia-Marchetti SM.81 transport and the IMAM Ro.37bis, the main reconnaissance aircraft in the Regia Aeronautica during the Second Italo-Ethiopian War, Spanish Civil War and Second World War, but the engine was also used by other designs, including the prototype Savoia-Marchetti SM.79.

== Design and development ==
Piaggio acquired a license from Gnome et Rhône in 1925 for their engines derived from the Bristol Jupiter and, in 1933, brought out a developed version, created under the direction of engineer Renzo Spolti. The engine had nine cylinders and was therefore named P.IX. It was one of a range of Piaggio radial engines named Stella, or Star, all based on the same radial design.

The engine had cylinders that had steel barrels and aluminium heads. Aluminium alloy pistons were connected to a split crankshaft via articulated connecting rods. The valves were enclosed. Each cylinder retained the same bore and stroke as the Gnome-Rhône 9K, 146 millimetres (5.7 in) and 165 mm (6.5 in) respectively. However, it was more powerful and was rated at 600 horsepower (447 kW) when fitted with a supercharger.

The engine was used to power aircraft that served during the Second Italo-Ethiopian War, Spanish Civil War and Second World War, including one hundred and forty Savoia-Marchetti SM.81s, a Regia Aeronautica transport, and the majority of the production of the IMAM Ro.37bis reconnaissance aircraft. Most had retired by 1943.

== Variants ==
P.IX R.
Normally aspirated and geared.
P.IX R.C.
Supercharged and geared.
P.IX R.C.10
Supercharged and geared, rated at 1,000 m (3,300 ft).
P.IX R.C.40
Supercharged and geared, rated at 4,000 m (13,000 ft).

== Applications ==
- CANT Z.504
- CANT Z.506 prototype
- Caproni Ca.131
- Caproni Ca.132
- Caproni Ca.301
- Caproni Ca.305
- Caproni CH.1
- IMAM Ro.37bis
- IMAM Ro.43 prototype
- Piaggio P.10bis
- Piaggio P.16
- Savoia-Marchetti S.73
- Savoia-Marchetti SM.79 prototype
- Savoia-Marchetti SM.81

== Specifications (R.C.40) ==
Data from Piaggio, 1939

=== General characteristics ===
- Type: 9-cylinder, single row, air cooled radial engine
- Bore: 146 mm (5.7 in)
- Stroke: 165 mm (6.5 in)
- Displacement: 24.9 L (1,519 in^{3})
- Length: 1,050 mm (41 in)
- Diameter: 1,408 mm (55.4 in)
- Dry weight: 430 kg (950 lb)

=== Components ===
- Valvetrain: 2 x overhead valves per cylinder operated by rockers and pushrods
- Supercharger: Centrifugal compressor
- Fuel type: 87 Octane petrol
- Cooling system: Air-cooled

=== Performance ===
- Power output:
  - Take-off: 610 hp (455 kW) at 2,100 rpm
  - Cruise: 600 hp (450 kW) at 2,100 rpm at 4,000 m (13,000 ft)
- Compression ratio: 6.0:1

== See also ==
Related development

- Gnome-Rhône 9K

Comparable engines

- Alfa Romeo 125
- Nakajima Kotobuki
- Pratt & Whitney R-1340 Wasp

Related lists

- List of aircraft engines
