= Morane-Saulnier M.S.225 =

French fighter aircraft of the 1930s

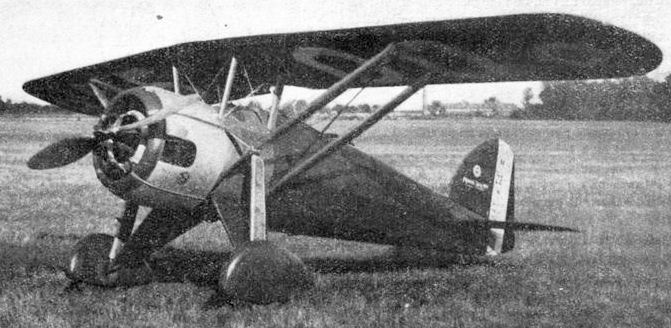

General information
- Type: Fighter
- Manufacturer: Morane-Saulnier
- Number built: 75

History
- First flight: 1932

The Morane-Saulnier M.S.225 was a French fighter aircraft of the 1930s. It was produced in limited quantities to be used as a transitional aircraft between the last of the biplanes and the first monoplane fighters.

== Design and development ==
The M.S.225 was a parasol monoplane, with a wide fixed landing gear, and powered by a Gnome-Rhône 9Krsd radial engine. Having a circular fuselage the M.S.225 was much more robust than its immediate predecessor, the M.S.224.

Created as a stop-gap before the introduction of more advanced aircraft still under development, the Morane-Saulnier M.S.225 was first shown in the form of a model at the Paris Air Show of 1932. After successful flight tests of the prototype, series production started at once.

Classified in the category C.1 (single-seat fighter), 75 aircraft were produced. A total of 53 aircraft were delivered to the Air Force in November 1933. The Aéronavale received the first of the 16 aircraft it had ordered in February 1934. Three were also sold to China.

== Operational history ==
The M.S.225s of the Armée de l'Air served in the 7e Escadre de Chasse (7th Fighter Wing) at Dijon, and in two escadrilles of the 42e Escadre (42nd Wing), based at Rheims. They were withdrawn from front-line service between 1936 and 1937. The aircraft also flew with the Aéronavale l'Escadrille 3C1, established in Marignane, this formation later transferring to the Air Force at the beginning of 1936, where it became Le Groupe de Chasse II/8.

The Air Force Aerobatic Squadron based at Étampes used five modified M.S.225s, with a larger vertical stabilizer, while the last unit of the Air Force to operate this aircraft was the flying school based at Salon-de-Provence.

At the outbreak of World War II, only 20 M.S.225s were still in flying condition, the majority of them being scrapped in mid-1940.

== Variants ==
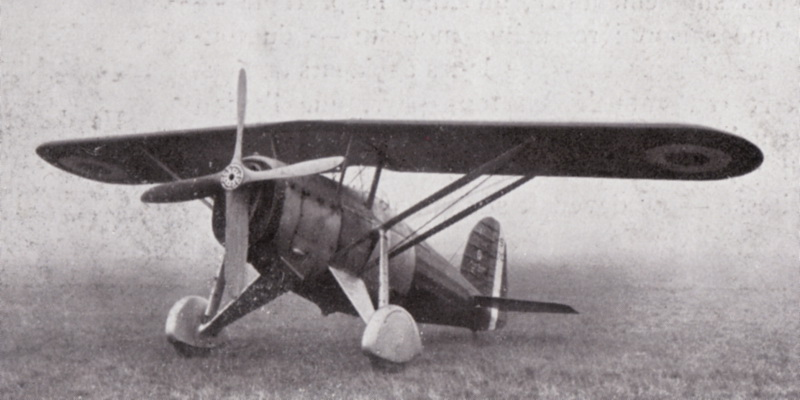
Morane-Saulnier MS.227 with Hispano-Suiza engine

M.S.225
Production variant with a Gnome-Rhone 9Krs engine, 75 built.
M.S.226
Variant fitted with an arrestor hook in 1933 for aircraft carrier operations, powered by a Gnome & Rhône 9Kdr.
M.S.226bis
Variant of the 226 with folding wings first flown in 1934.
M.S.227
Variant used as test bench for the 515 kW (690 hp) Hispano-Suiza 12Xcrs engine, with a four-bladed propeller.
M.S.275
First flying in 1934, this version had a modified aerofoil and empennage, and was powered by a 515 kW (690 hp) Gnome-Rhône 9Krse; did not enter production.
M.S.278
Conversion of the M.S.225 equipped with a 388 kW (520 hp) Clerget 14Fcs diesel engine.

== Operators ==
France

- Armee de l'Air
- Aeronavale

China

- Three aircraft only.

== Specifications (M.S.225) ==
Data from The Complete Book of Fighters

General characteristics

- Crew: 1
- Length: 7.25 m (23 ft 9 in)
- Wingspan: 10.56 m (34 ft 8 in)
- Height: 3.26 m (10 ft 8 in)
- Wing area: 17.2 m^{2} (185 sq ft)
- Empty weight: 1,154 kg (2,544 lb)
- Gross weight: 1,590 kg (3,505 lb)
- Powerplant: 1 × Gnome-Rhône 9Kdrs 9-cylinder, air-cooled, geared and supercharged, radial piston engine, 373 kW (500 hp)
- Propellers: 2-bladed fixed-pitch wooden propeller

Performance

- Maximum speed: 334 km/h (208 mph, 180 kn) at 3,850 m (12,631 ft)
- Range: 700 km (430 mi, 380 nmi)
- Service ceiling: 10,000 m (33,000 ft)
- Rate of climb: 6.12 m/s (1,205 ft/min)
- Time to altitude: 3,000 m (9,800 ft) in 5 minutes 42 seconds

Armament

- Guns: 2 × 7.7 mm (.303 in) Vickers machine guns mounted on the fuselage

== See also ==
Aircraft of comparable role, configuration, and era

- Nakajima Type 91
- Nakajima A1N
- Curtiss F11C

Related lists

- List of Interwar military aircraft
- List of aircraft of the French Air Force during World War II
- List of military aircraft of France
- List of fighter aircraft

== Bibliography ==
- Bruner, Georges (1977). "Fighters a la Francaise, Part One". Air Enthusiast (3): 85–95. ISSN 0143-5450.
- Cortet, Pierre (June 1999). "Issu, à l'origine, d'un régime "Jockey": Le Morane-Saulnier MS 225 C1" [Originally from a "Jockey" Diet: The Morane-Saulnier MS 225 C1]. Avions: Toute l'Aéronautique et son histoire (in French) (75): 28–35. ISSN 1243-8650.
- Cortet, Pierre (July 1999). "Issu, à l'origine, d'un régime "Jockey": Le Morane-Saulnier MS 225 C1". Avions: Toute l'Aéronautique et son histoire (in French) (76): 32–38. ISSN 1243-8650.
- Cortet, Pierre (September 1999). "Issu, à l'origine, d'un régime "Jockey": Le Morane-Saulnier MS 225 C1". Avions: Toute l'Aéronautique et son histoire (in French) (78): 36–47. ISSN 1243-8650.
- Lecarme, Jacques (January 1970). "J'ai piloté les Morane "Jockey"..." [I Flew the Morane "Jockey"]. Le Album de Fanatique de l'Aviation (in French) (7): 22–23. ISSN 0757-4169.
- Leyvastre, Pierre (August–September 1969). "La chasse avait besoin de suralimentation lorsque naquit, le M.S.-225" [The Fighter That Needed Supercharging at Birth: the M.S.-225]. Le Album de Fanatique de l'Aviation (in French) (3): 14–19. ISSN 0757-4169.
- Leyvastre, Pierre (October 1969). "Par navalisation du MS-225 on obtint en 1934, le Morane Saulnier MS 226" [By Navalizing the MS-225, We Obtained the Morane Saulnier 226 in 1934]. Le Album de Fanatique de l'Aviation (in French) (4): 18–19. ISSN 0757-4169.
- Leyvastre, Pierre (January 1970). "M.S.-227, avion-canon; le banc d'essais d'une arme qui fit carrière" [M.S.-227 Cannon Aircraft: Career Weapons Bench-tester]. Le Album de Fanatique de l'Aviation (in French) (7): 20–22. ISSN 0757-4169.
- Morareau, Lucien (December 1999). "Les Morane-Saulnier MS 225 & 226 de la Marine" [The Naval Morane-Saulnier MS 225 & 226s]. Avions: Toute l'Aéronautique et son histoire (in French) (80): 18–27. ISSN 1243-8650.
- Soulard, Stéphane (November 1999). "Courrier des Lecteurs" [Readers' Letters]. Avions: Toute l'Aéronautique et son histoire (in French) (80): 2–3. ISSN 1243-8650.
