= Caproni CH.1 =

Italian biplane fighter prototype

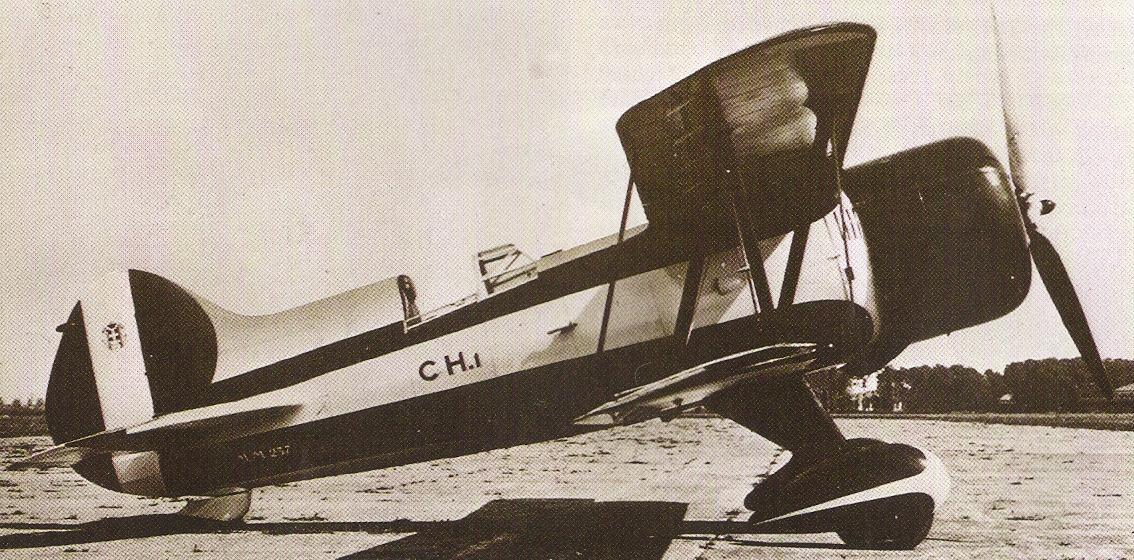

General information
- Type: Fighter
- National origin: Italy
- Manufacturer: Caproni
- Designer: Antonio Chiodi
- Number built: 1

History
- First flight: May 1935
- Retired: August 1935

The Caproni CH.1 was a single-seat biplane fighter, a single example of which was produced as a prototype in Italy in 1935.

== Design ==
Antonio Chiodi began design work on a new single-seat fighter in 1934 as a private venture of the Caproni company. He designed the Caproni CH.1—"CH" standing for "Chiodi"—as an aerodynamically clean single-bay biplane of all-metal construction, with fabric skin and wings of equal span. The aircraft had spatted landing gear. The cockpit was enclosed, with a canopy that opened by sliding to the rear.

Chiodi intended the CH.1 to be powered by a Gnome-Rhône 14Kfs Mistral Major 14-cylinder radial engine, rated at 581 kW (779 hp) at 4,750 meters (15,584 feet), but instead the aircraft was constructed with a Piaggio Stella P.IX R.C.40 nine-cylinder radial rated at 417 kW (559 hp) at 4,000 meters (13,123 feet) driving a three-bladed, variable-pitch propeller.

The CH.1's proposed armament was two fixed forward-firing 7.7-millimeter (0.303-inch) Breda-SAFAT machine guns synchronized to fire through the propeller.

== Operational history ==
Chiodi himself piloted the CH.1 on its first flight, which took place in May 1935. After the Caproni company finished its tests, the Regia Aeronautica (Italian Royal Air Force), tested the CH.1 at Guidonia Montecelio in July and August 1935. Although powered by an engine of lower power than its designer intended, the CH.1 had an exceptional rate of climb.

Tests ended when the CH.1 flipped over onto its back during a landing and was damaged in August 1935. The Regia Aeronautica did not place a production order, and no further examples were built.

== Specifications (CH.1) ==
Data from p. 108.

General characteristics

- Crew: one
- Length: 7.19 m (23 ft 7 in)
- Wingspan: 8.60 m (28 ft 3 in)
- Height: 2.90 m (9 ft 6 in)
- Wing area: 19.00 m^{2} (204.5 sq ft)
- Empty weight: 1,400 kg (3,086 lb)
- Gross weight: 2,000 kg (4,409 lb)
- Powerplant: 1 × Piaggio Stella P.IX R.C.40 9-cylinder radial, 417 kW (559 hp) at 4,000 m (13,000 ft)
- Propellers: 3-bladed variable-pitch

Performance

- Maximum speed: 327 km/h (203 mph, 177 kn) at sea level

377 km/h (234 mph; 204 kn) at 5,000 m (16,000 ft)

- Cruise speed: 380 km/h (236 mph, 205 kn)
- Range: 1,000 km (620 mi, 540 nmi)
- Rate of climb: 5.51 m/s (1,085 ft/min)
- Time to altitude: 7.26 minutes to 4,000 m (13,000 ft)Xs

Armament

- Guns: 2 × fixed, forward-firing 7.70 mm (0.303 in) Breda-SAFAT machine guns
