= Savoia-Marchetti S.73 =

Italian airliner

S.73
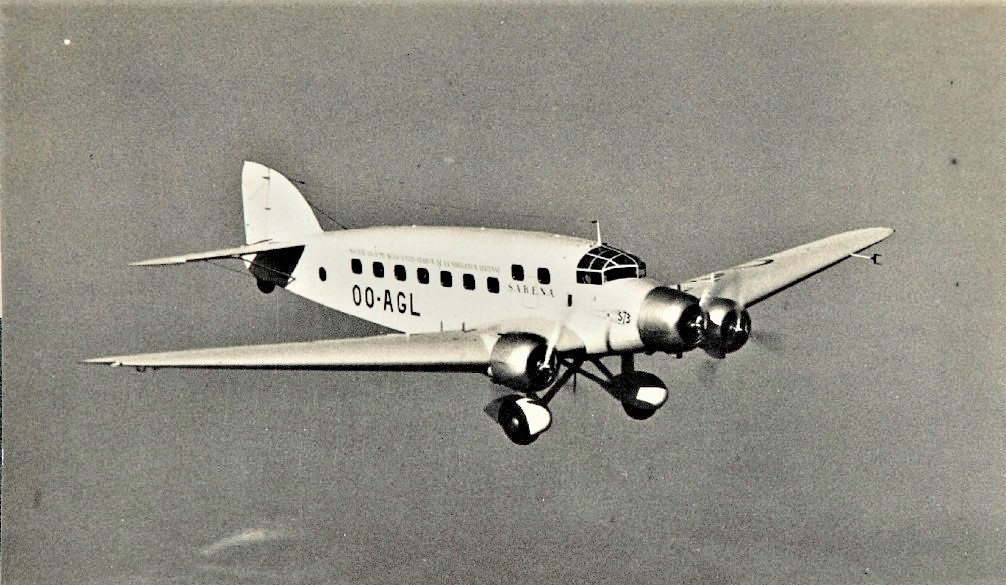
- SABENA's Savoia-Marchetti S.73

General information
- Type: Airliner
- Manufacturer: Savoia-Marchetti
- Primary users: Ala Littoria Regia Aeronautica
- Number built: 55

History
- First flight: 4 June 1934
- Variant: Savoia-Marchetti SM.81

The Savoia-Marchetti S.73 was an Italian three-engine airliner that flew in the 1930s and early 1940s. The aircraft entered service in March 1935 with a production run of 48 aircraft. Four were exported to Belgium for SABENA, while seven others were produced by SABCA. The main customer was the Italian airline Ala Littoria.

== Design and development ==
The aircraft was developed in only four months, thanks to the use of the S.55 wing, combined with a much more conventional fuselage. Developed in parallel with a bomber version (the SM.81 Pipistrello) the prototype S.73 first flew on 4 June 1934 from Cameri, with Adriano Bacula as test pilot.

The prototype had a four-blade wooden propeller on the central engine, and two-blade wooden propellers on each wing engine. Later all aircraft were fitted with three-blade metal propellers.

The S.73 was a mixed-construction (a skeleton of steel covered by wood and fabric for the fuselage, wood for the three-spar wing) monoplane with a braced tailplane and fixed undercarriage. There were two generators, one in each side of the fuselage; the batteries were 24 V and were rated at 90 A.

The pilot and co-pilot were seated side-by-side in an enclosed cockpit, with a compartment for a radio operator and a mechanic. A passenger compartment could house 18 passengers in two rows.

It had eight metallic fuel tanks, all in the wings, with a total capacity of 3,950 L (1,040 US gal; 870 imp gal). The prototype had French Gnome-Rhône 9Kfr Mistral engines, but further aircraft had 522 kW (700 hp) Piaggio Stella P.X, 574 kW (770 hp) Wright R-1820, 544 kW (730 hp) Walter Pegasus III MR2V, Alfa Romeo 125 or Alfa Romeo 126, driving ground adjustable, three-bladed, aluminium-steel propellers.

It could be used from small airports, had reliable handling and was not too costly. With the 574 kW (770 hp)Wright R-1820 engine the S.73 had cruise/max speeds of 270 / 340 km/h (150 / 180 kn; 170 / 210 mph), 1,000 km (620 mi) range, and 6,300 m (20,700 ft) ceiling. With the 544 kW (730 hp) AR.126 the S.73 had a maximum speed of 345 km/h (186 kn; 214 mph), 1,000 km (620 mi) range, and 7,000 m (23,000 ft) ceiling. The SABCA license-produced aircraft had 671 kW (900 hp) Gnome-Rhône 14K Mistral Major engines for a total of 2,013 kW (2,699 hp), comparable to the last models of S.79s or the CANT Z.1018.

The S.73 had an unremarkable flight test programme with few modifications recommended by the Regia Aeronautica. It was easy to fly, rugged, and easy to operate on the ground, including the ability to fly from short airfields in treacherous terrain, in spite of being under-powered and the lack of leading edge slats. Its mixed construction and fixed landing gear were its main shortcomings, when contemporary aircraft in the US and Germany were of all-metal construction with retractable undercarriages. Some of these had better performance, but the S.73 remained competitive for some years.

== Operational history ==
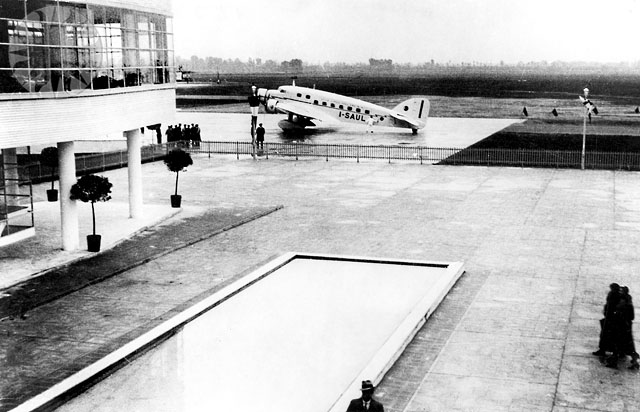
S.73 at Milan Linate airport

The first operator of the S.73 was the Belgian airline SABENA, which purchased five Gnome-Rhône 9Kfr Mistral Major-powered S.73s from Savoia-Marchetti in 1935, introducing them on European routes in the summer of 1935. Two of these aircraft were lost in accidents in 1935. Seven more S.73s, powered by Gnome-Rhône 14K Mistral Major engines, were built for SABENA under license by SABCA in 1936–1937, which allowed the S.73 to replace the Fokker F.VII on the service from Belgium to the Congo. This service took four days (with no overnight flying) with a flight time of 44 hours.

The second operator of the S.73 was the Italian airline Ala Littoria, which received at least 21 examples, powered by a variety of engines, including the Piaggio Stella X, the Wright R-1820 and the Alfa Romeo 126 RC.10. They were used on services within Europe and to Italy's African empire. In December 1935, an S.73 was used for a journey from Italy to Asmara, delivering over 200,000 letters, with 6,600 km (4,100 mi) traveled in four days, followed by the return trip to Rome on 6 January 1936. A commercial line was established covering a 6,100 km (3,790 mi) journey. Other users included Avio Linee Italiane (powered by Alfa Romeo 126) and Československé Státní Aerolinie (powered by Walter Pegasus).

At the outbreak of World War II the S.73 was already obsolete, but some of the aircraft were pressed into service with the Regia Aeronautica for operations in Abyssinia and Spain.

Nine S.73s were present in Eastern Africa and used as military transports. Owing to the poor military situation, with British Commonwealth forces on the brink of capturing Addis Ababa, the Duke of Aosta, the Viceroy of Italian East Africa, ordered the remaining three S.73s to be evacuated. After several days of preparation, they took off from Addis Ababa on 3 April 1941 with 36 men on board, planning to fly to Kufra in Libya, 2,500 km (1,600 mi) away, requiring additional fuel tanks in the fuselage. All three aircraft force-landed in the desert, but refuelled at Jeddah, before resuming their journey.

After several days of difficulties, including sand storms that clogged up the air filters, they took off again. Initially, it was planned to make another landing in Beirut but in the meantime Erwin Rommel had conquered Benghazi, so this was the final destination of the three aircraft. Two aircraft, after 10 hours of flying and the men inside almost killed by fumes of the fuel auxiliary tanks, landed at Benghazi, after 4,500 km (2,800 mi) and over a month of travel.

Seven Belgian S.73s were flown to the United Kingdom in May 1940 and were pressed into service by the Royal Air Force, and, operated by the SABENA flight crews, were used to fly ammunition to the British Expeditionary Force in Northern France. After two were destroyed by the Luftwaffe at Merville on 23 May, SABENA ordered its surviving aircraft, including the five S.73s, to move to France in preparation for transfer to the Belgian Congo. After the surrender of Belgium on 28 May the SABENA fleet was placed at the disposal of the French government and used to ferry pilots between the French mainland and French North Africa. Following France's surrender on 22 June 1940, the SABENA fleet, including the S.73s, was seized by Italy and operated by the Regia Aeronautica. The S.73s still in Italy were used to equip 605 and 606 Squadriglie. Four S.73s survived until the 1943 armistice, three being used by the Allies and one by the pro-Axis government; all had been taken out of service by the end of the war.

== Accidents and incidents ==
7 November 1935
S.73P OO-AGM of SABENA was damaged beyond repair whilst taxiing at London-Croydon Airport.

10 December 1935

S.73 OO-AGN of SABENA crashed at Tatsfield, Surrey, United Kingdom with the loss of all eleven on board.

26 January 1937
S.73P OO-AGR of SABENA crashed on approach to Oran Es Sénia Airport (ORN/DAOO), Algeria, with the loss of all 12 occupants (8 passengers and 4 crew).

2 August 1937
S.73 I-SUSA of Ala Littoria crashed on approach to Wadi Halfa Airport (WHF/HSSW), Sudan, with the loss of all 9 occupants (6 passengers and 3 crew).

30 April 1938
S.73 I-MEDA of Ala Littoria crashed on a flight from Tirana to Rome. The aircraft struck the mountains near Maranola and all nineteen occupants were killed (14 passengers and 5 crew).

13 August 1938
S.73 OK-BAG of ČSA (Československé státní aerolinie) crashed on approach to Strasbourg with the loss of all 17 on board (13 passengers and 4 crew).

10 October 1938
S.73P OO-AGT of SABENA broke-up in flight over Soest, Germany whilst en route to Berlin. All twenty on board were killed (16 passengers and 4 crew).

17 October 1939
S.73 I-IESI? of Ala Littoria crashed en route to Melilla Airport (MLN/GEML) with the loss of 15 of the 17 persons on board (10 passengers and 5 crew).

16 March 1940
S.73 I-SUTO of Avio Linee Italiane (ALI) crashed on Stromboli in bad weather killing all 14 aboard (9 passengers and 5 crew).

14 May 1940
S.73P OO-AGP of Sabena was destroyed on the ground at Brussels-Haren Airport to prevent capture by invading German forces.

23 May 1940
S.73P OO-AGS of Sabena was shot down by German ground fire near Arques, whilst being operated on behalf of No.271 Squadron RAF, with the loss of one crew member.

23 May 1940
S.73P OO-AGZ of Sabena was destroyed on the ground at Merville whilst being transferred to No.24 Squadron RAF.

== Operators ==
=== Civil operators ===
Belgium

- SABENA

Czechoslovakia

- ČSA

Kingdom of Italy

- Ala Littoria
- Avio Linee Italiane

=== Military operators ===
Belgium

- Belgian Air Force

Kingdom of Italy

- Regia Aeronautica
- Italian Co-Belligerent Air Force

United Kingdom

- Royal Air Force
  - No. 24 Squadron RAF
  - No. 117 Squadron RAF

== Specifications (S.73) ==
Data from Italian Civil and Military aircraft 1930–1945

General characteristics

- Crew: 4
- Capacity: 18 passengers + 362.9 kg (800 lb) of baggage
- Length: 17.44 m (57 ft 2 3/4 in)
- Wingspan: 23.99 m (78 ft 8 2/3 in)
- Height: 4.60 m (15 ft 1 in)
- Wing area: 92.97 m^{2} (1,000.7 sq ft)
- Empty weight: 5,788 kg (12,760 lb)
- Gross weight: 9,280 kg (20,460 lb)
- Fuel capacity: 3,950 L (1,040 US gal; 870 imp gal)
- Powerplant: 3 × Piaggio Stella P.IX R.C. 9-cyl air-cooled radial piston engines, 520 kW (700 hp) each
  - (prototype fitted with 3 x 447.42 kW (600 hp) Gnome-Rhone 9Kfs radial engines)
- Propellers: 3-bladed metal variable pitch

Performance

- Maximum speed: 330 km/h (205 mph, 178 kn)
  - At 4,000 m (13,123 ft).
  - On two engines, maximum speed was 270 km/h (168 mph)
- Cruise speed: 280 km/h (174 mph, 151 kn)
- Stall speed: 90 km/h (56 mph, 49 kn)
- Range: 1,600 km (994 mi, 864 nmi)
- Service ceiling: 7,398 m (24,272 ft) On two engines 4,399 m (14,432 ft)
- Rate of climb: 3.333 m/s (656.1 ft/min)
- Time to altitude:
  - 2,000 m (6,562 ft) in 10 minutes
  - 4,000 m (13,123 ft) in 20 minutes
  - 6,000 m (19,685 ft) in 33 minutes

== See also ==
Related development

- Savoia-Marchetti SM.81 Pipistrello

Aircraft of comparable role, configuration, and era

- Junkers Ju 52

Related lists

- List of aircraft of World War II
