= Piaggio P.X =

1930s Italian aircraft piston engine

Stella P.X
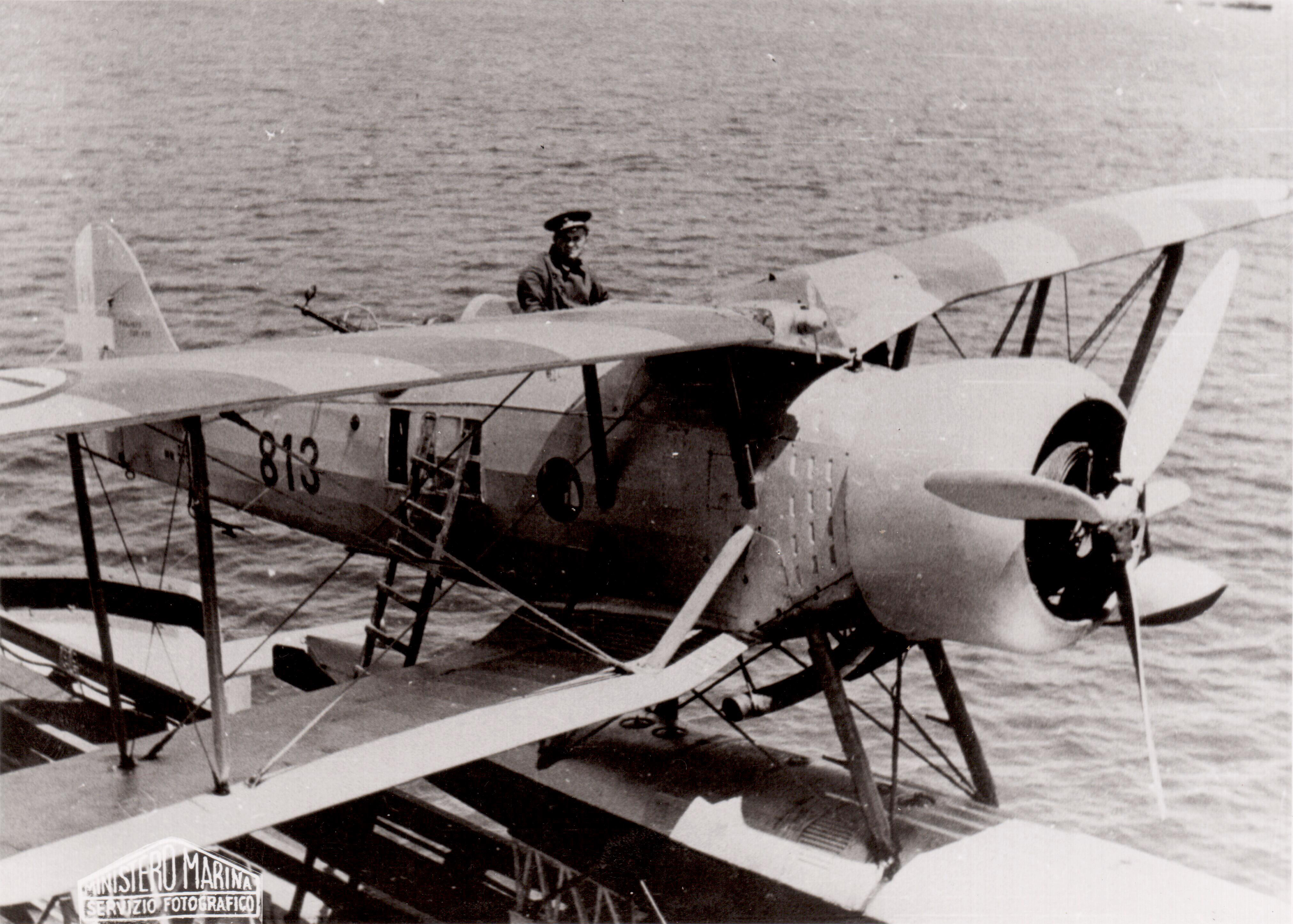
- A close-cowled P.X fitted to an IMAM Ro.43 in 1940
- Type: Air cooled radial
- National origin: Italy
- Manufacturer: Piaggio
- Designer: Renzo Spolti
- Major applications: IMAM Ro.43
- Developed from: Piaggio Stella P.IX

The Piaggio P.X, or Piaggio Stella P.X, was an Italian nine-cylinder radial aircraft engine produced by Rinaldo Piaggio S.p.A. Based on experience license-producing Gnome et Rhône designs, the engine was used to power a number of aircraft during World War II, including the IMAM Ro.37bis and IMAM Ro.43, used extensively by the Regia Aeronautica and Regia Marina respectively.

== Design and development ==
Piaggio acquired a license from Gnome et Rhône in 1925 for their engines derived from the Bristol Jupiter. The designs proved successful and, using this experience, the company designed a range of related radial engines named "Stella", meaning star. The design was led by the engineer Renzo Spolti. The engines were initially known by their number of cylinders, so the first nine-cylinder model in the range was the P.IX of 1933. However, a progressive number in Roman numerals was used as the design progressed, so the P.IX was followed by the P.X.

The Stella P.X was a nine-cylinder version of the P.VII. It retained the same bore and stroke as the original Gnome-Rhône designs, 146 mm (5.7 in) and 165 mm (6.5 in) respectively, but was substantially more powerful than the comparable 9K. The engine had a two-piece aluminium-alloy crankcase, steel barrels for the cylinders, and aluminium-alloy heads. A Piaggio T2-80 updraught carburettor was fitted. The basic version, the R., had reduction gear, while the R.C. was also equipped with a compressor.

The engine powered the Italian aircraft that served during World War II. The IMAM Ro.43 was particularly noteworthy for its performance in the Battles of Cape Spartivento and Cape Matapan.

== Variants ==
P.X R.
Normally aspirated and geared.
P.X R.C.15
Supercharged and geared, rated at 1,500 m (4,900 ft).
P.X R.C.35
Supercharged and geared, rated at 3,500 m (11,500 ft).

== Applications ==
- IMAM Ro.37bis
- IMAM Ro.43
- IMAM Ro.44
- Savoia-Marchetti S.73
- Savoia-Marchetti S.74
- Savoia-Marchetti SM.81

== Specifications (R.C.35) ==
Data from Wilkinson, 1945

=== General characteristics ===
- Type: 9-cylinder, single row, air cooled radial engine
- Bore: 146 mm (5.7 in)
- Stroke: 165 mm (6.5 in)
- Displacement: 24.9 L (1,519 in^{3})
- Length: 1,408 mm (55.4 in)
- Diameter: 1,280 mm (50 in)
- Dry weight: 430 kg (950 lb)

=== Components ===
- Valvetrain: 2 x overhead valves per cylinder operated by rockers and pushrods
- Supercharger: Centrifugal compressor
- Fuel type: 87 Octane petrol
- Cooling system: Air-cooled

=== Performance ===
- Power output:
  - Take-off: 640 hp (477 kW) at 2,250 rpm
  - Cruise: 450 hp (336 kW) at 1,800 rpm at 3,500 m (11,500 ft)
- Compression ratio: 6.0:1
- Specific fuel consumption: 300 g/kWh (0.48 lb/(hp·h))
- Oil consumption: 8 g/kWh (0.018 lb/(hp·h))

== See also ==
Related development

- Piaggio Stella P.IX

Comparable engines

- Gnome-Rhône 9K
- Nakajima Kotobuki
- Pratt & Whitney R-1340 Wasp

Related lists

- List of aircraft engines
