= CANT Z.504 =

1930s proposed Italian flying boat

Z.504

General information
- Type: Patrol aircraft
- Manufacturer: CANT
- Designer: Filippo Zappata
- Status: prototype only
- Primary user: Regia Aeronautica
- Number built: 1

History
- First flight: 1 September 1934

The CANT Z.504 was a prototype reconnaissance biplane flying boat made by CANT in the 1930s.

== Development ==
Since the 1920s the Regia Aeronautica evaluated the opportunity to equip some of its units with support aircraft. To overcome the difficulties of use in the presence of heavy seas, launch structures were installed, real and proper, on which was appropriately fixed the aircraft that was brought at a speed sufficient to allow take-off.

After using various seaplanes designed for civil use such as Macchi M.18, or more specific Piaggio P.6 and CANT 25, in 1933 the Ministry of Aeronautics on behalf of the Regia Marina, issued a specification for the supply of a new two-seater aircraft to be used in the roles of reconnaissance and hunting, and able to replace the previous designs and characterized mainly from a single-engine configuration. The performances required by the specifications concerned the maximum speed at low altitude, set at at least 240 km/h (150 mph; 130 kn), the stall speed, equal to 95 km/h (59 mph; 51 kn), a rise time that at full load allowed the achievement of a quota equal to 5,000 m (16,000 ft) in 26 minutes, an autonomy at cruising speed of 6 hours 30 minutes and a range of action of 600 km (370 mi).

The Z.504 flew on 1 September 1934, but lost out to the IMAM Ro.43 for the production contract. The Z.504 was later owned by the brothers Callisto and Alberto Cosulich, where it was presumably used as a training aircraft.

== Design ==
The Z.504 was designed by Filippo Zappata, the successor to Raffaele Conflenti, chief designer at CANT. The aircraft was characterized by a biplane veiling, the only model of Zappata to use it, and by a central hull configuration with an aerodynamically well-groomed profile.

== Specifications ==
Data from Mucamonfalcone: CANT-Z. 504 Idrovolante imbarcato da ricognizione, Airwar: CANT Z.504

General characteristics

- Crew: 2
- Length: 9.81 m (32 ft 2 in)
- Wingspan: 12 m (39 ft 4 in)
- Empty weight: 1,547 kg (3,411 lb)
- Powerplant: 1 × Piaggio Stella P.IX R.C.40 9-cylinder air-cooled radial piston engine, 450 kW (610 hp)
- Propellers: 2-bladed fixed-pitch propeller

Performance

- Maximum speed: 300 km/h (190 mph, 160 kn)
- Cruise speed: 245 km/h (152 mph, 132 kn)
- Endurance: 6 hours 30 minutes

Armament

- Guns: 1 or 2 × 7.7 mm (0.303 in) machine guns

== See also ==
Aircraft of comparable role, configuration, and era

- Aichi H9A
- Beriev Be-4
- Dornier Do 18
- Fairchild 91
- Saunders-Roe A.36 Lerwick

Related lists

- List of aircraft of World War II
- List of Interwar military aircraft
- List of Regia Aeronautica aircraft used in World War II
- List of flying boats and floatplanes
