= Morane-Saulnier MS.224 =

1930s French prototype fighter aircraft

Morane-Saulnier M.S.224
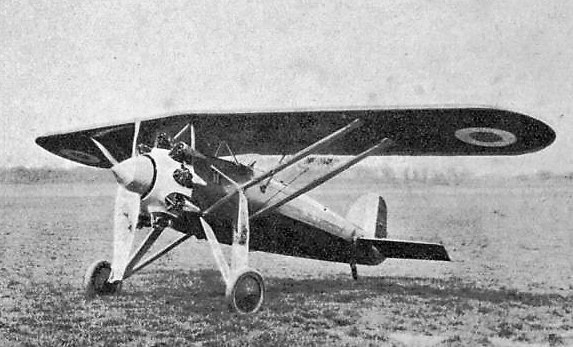

General information
- Type: Fighter
- Manufacturer: Morane-Saulnier
- Number built: 1

History
- First flight: July 1931
- Variant: Morane-Saulnier M.S.225

The Morane-Saulnier MS.224 was a prototype fighter plane built by Morane-Saulnier in the early 1930s.

== Design ==
The MS.224 was a high-wing monoplane based on the Morane-Saulnier MS.223, being made from wood and metal. It differed from the MS.223 in having a larger wing and Gnome-Rhône 9Asb engine. The MS.224 flew in 1931 and showed an improvement in top speed over that of the MS.223 despite an increase in weight. Although the MS.224 wasn't ordered into production, it paved way for the development of the Morane-Saulnier M.S.225.

== Specifications (MS.224) ==
Data from

General characteristics

- Crew: 1
- Length: 7.18 m (23 ft 7 in)
- Wingspan: 10.42 m (34 ft 2 in)
- Height: 3.02 m (9 ft 11 in)
- Wing area: 17 m^{2} (180 sq ft)
- Empty weight: 1,060 kg (2,337 lb)
- Gross weight: 1,458 kg (3,214 lb)
- Powerplant: 1 × Gnome-Rhône 9Asb 9-cylinder air-cooled radial piston engine, 360 kW (480 hp)

Performance

- Maximum speed: 303 km/h (188 mph, 164 kn) at 2,000 m (6,600 ft)
- Service ceiling: 9,400 m (30,800 ft)
- Rate of climb: 6.12 m/s (1,205 ft/min)
- Time to altitude: 4,000 m (13,000 ft) in 6 minutes 26 seconds

Armament

- Guns: 2 × 7.7 mm (0.303 in) Vickers machine guns mounted on the fuselage
