= Caproni Ca.132 =

Ca.132
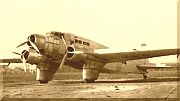

General information
- Type: Bomber/airliner
- Manufacturer: Caproni
- Status: Prototype only

History
- First flight: 1934

The Caproni Ca.132 was a prototype for a large aircraft built in Italy in 1934, intended for use as either a bomber or airliner. It was a conventional low-wing cantilever monoplane, powered by a radial engine on each wing and in the nose. The main undercarriage was housed within large streamlined spats. Configured as an airliner, it would have seated 20 passengers.

== Operators ==
Kingdom of Italy

- Regia Aeronautica for evaluation only.

== Specifications (as bomber) ==
General characteristics

- Crew: four
- Length: 18.60 m (61 ft 0 in)
- Wingspan: 26.69 m (87 ft 7 in)
- Height: 4.15 m (13 ft 7 in)
- Wing area: 100.9 m^{2} (1,086 sq ft)
- Empty weight: 7,000 kg (15,430 lb)
- Gross weight: 10,700 kg (23,590 lb)
- Powerplant: 3 × Piaggio Stella P.IX , 418 kW (560 hp) each

Performance

- Maximum speed: 314 km/h (196 mph, 170 kn)
- Service ceiling: 6,300 m (20,664 ft)

Armament

- 4 × 7.7 mm (.303 in) Breda-SAFAT machine guns
- 900 kg (1,980 lb) of bombs
