= Gnome-Rhône 9K =

1920s French piston aircraft engine

9K
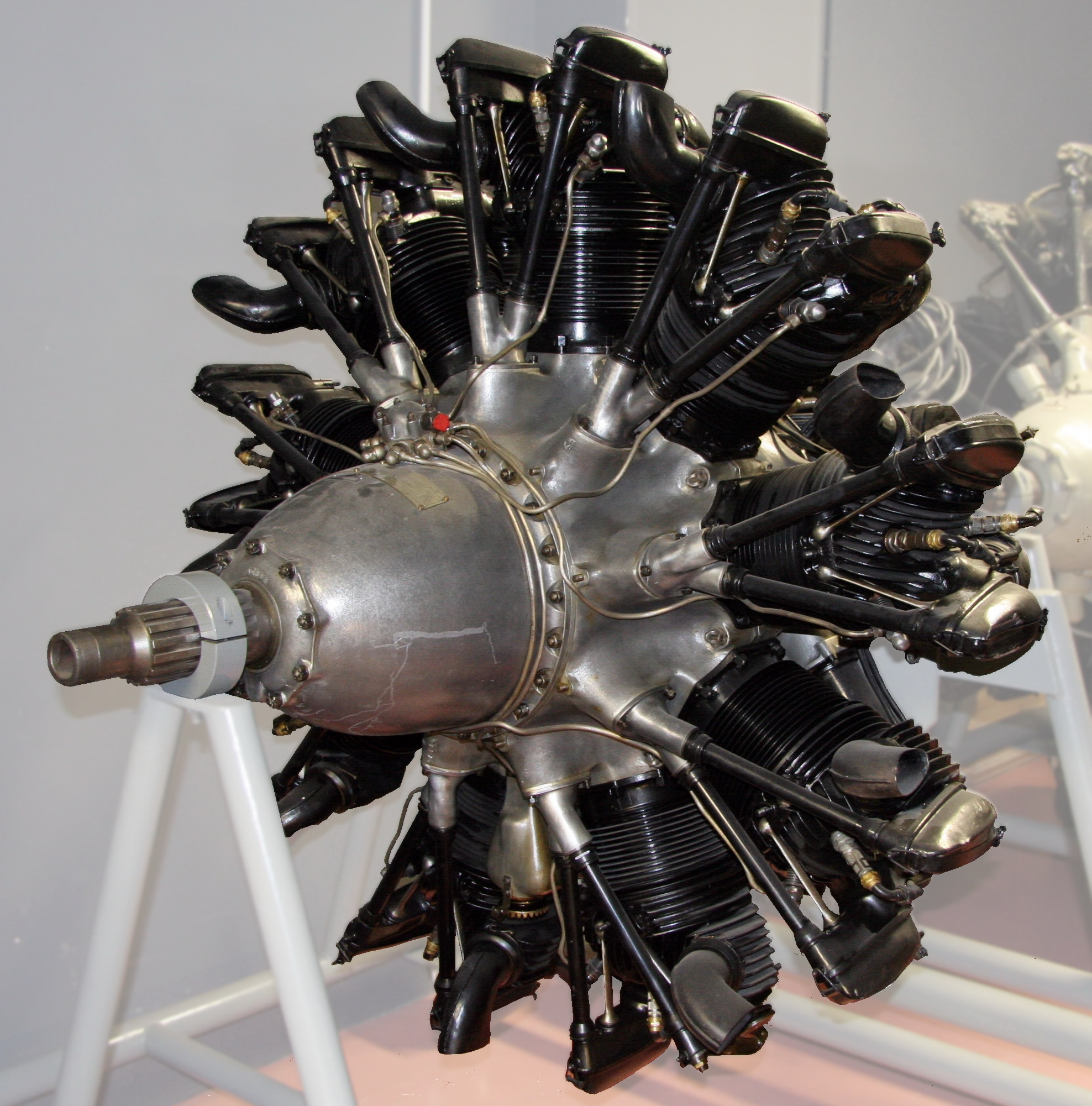
- Type: Radial engine
- Manufacturer: Gnome et Rhône
- Developed into: Piaggio Stella P.IX

The Gnome-Rhône 9K Mistral was a nine-cylinder 550 hp (405 kW) to 700 hp air-cooled radial engine, that started life as an enlarged Gnome-Rhône 7K with two extra cylinders.

== Design and development ==
The Gnome-Rhône 7K itself was an enlarged version of the Gnome-Rhône 5K which was derived from a licensed version of the Bristol Titan. A redesign of the cylinders is indicated by the K suffix. The 9K was followed by the larger and more powerful 14-cylinder twin row Gnome-Rhône 14K.

The 9K was license produced by Hungarian company Weiss Manfréd Repülogép- és Motorgyár Rt. (WM Rt, the aircraft engine factory of Manfred Weiss). The 9K was also produced in the Soviet Union as the M-75 at GAZ-29 in Zaporozhye. Only small numbers were built and it was dropped in favor of the M-25, a version of the Wright Cyclone and the M-85, a version of the Gnome-Rhône 14K Mistral Major.

== Variants ==
9K
9Kbr
9Kdr
9Kdrs
9Kers
9Kfr

I.A.R. 9KIc40
Licence production in Romania by Industria Aeronautică Română (IAR).

== Applications ==
- Breguet Calcutta
- IAR-15
- Loire 70
- Morane-Saulnier M.S.225
- SNCAC NC.510
- Wibault 313
- Wibault 365

== Specifications (9Kd) ==
Data from

=== General characteristics ===
- Type: Nine-cylinder air-cooled radial engine.
- Bore: 146 mm (5.75 in)
- Stroke: 165 mm (6.50 in)
- Displacement: 24.9 L (1,520 cu in)
- Length: Kdr 0.5 reduction gear - 1,295 mm (50.98 in)
  Kdr 0.666· reduction gear - 1,297 mm (51.06 in)
  Kdrs 0.5 reduction gear - 1,323 mm (52.09 in)
  Kdrs 0.666· reduction gear - 1,325 mm (52.17 in)
- Diameter: 1,299 mm (51.14 in)
- Dry weight: Kdr 0.5 reduction gear - 355 kg (783 lb)
  Kdr 0.666· reduction gear - 360 kg (790 lb)
  Kdrs 0.5 reduction gear - 369 kg (814 lb)
  Kdrs 0.666· reduction gear - 374 kg (825 lb)

=== Components ===
- Valvetrain: Two valves per cylinder, pushrod operated
- Supercharger: Kdrsd - single stage centrifugal blower
- Fuel system: Carburetor
- Fuel type: Gasoline
- Cooling system: Air-cooled
- Reduction gear: Direct drive, 0.5:1 or 0.666·:1

=== Performance ===
- Power output: Kdr - 370 kW (500 hp) at sea level
  Kdrs - 370 kW (500 hp) at 1,500 m (4,900 ft)
  Kdrs - 340 kW (450 hp) at 4,000 m (13,000 ft)
- Compression ratio: 5.5:1

== See also ==
Related development

- Piaggio Stella P.IX
- Tumansky M-90

Comparable engines

- BMW 132
- Bramo 323
- Bristol Mercury
- Piaggio P.X
- Pratt & Whitney R-1340 Wasp

Related lists

- List of aircraft engines
