= Caproni Ca.131 =

1930s Italian prototype aircraft

Ca.131

General information
- Type: Multirole transport
- Manufacturer: Caproni
- Status: Prototype only

History
- First flight: 1934

The Caproni Ca.131 was a prototype for a large aircraft built in Italy in 1934, intended for use as either a bomber or airliner. It was a conventional low-wing cantilever monoplane, powered by a radial engine on each wing and in the nose. The main undercarriage was housed within large streamlined spats. Configured as an airliner, it would have seated 17 passengers.

== Operators ==
Kingdom of Italy

- Regia Aeronautica for evaluation only.

== Specifications ==
Data from Aeroplani Caproni, Airwar:Caproni Ca 131

General characteristics

- Crew: 2
- Capacity: 17 pax
- Length: 16.5 m (54 ft 2 in)
- Wingspan: 27.9 m (91 ft 6 in)
- Height: 3.9 m (12 ft 10 in)
- Wing area: 94.62 m^{2} (1,018.5 sq ft)
- Empty weight: 5,000 kg (11,023 lb)
- Gross weight: 8,500 kg (18,739 lb)
- Powerplant: 2 × Alfa Romeo Jupiter IV 9-cylinder air-cooled radial piston engines, 310 kW (420 hp) each
- Powerplant: 1 × Piaggio Stella P.IX 9-cylinder air-cooled radial piston engine, 380 kW (510 hp)
- Propellers: 2-bladed metal propellers

Performance

- Maximum speed: 240 km/h (150 mph, 130 kn)
- Cruise speed: 195 km/h (121 mph, 105 kn)
- Endurance: 3 hours
- Service ceiling: 4,500 m (14,800 ft)
