= Savoia-Marchetti SM.81 Pipistrello =

1934 Italian bomber-transport aircraft

SM.81
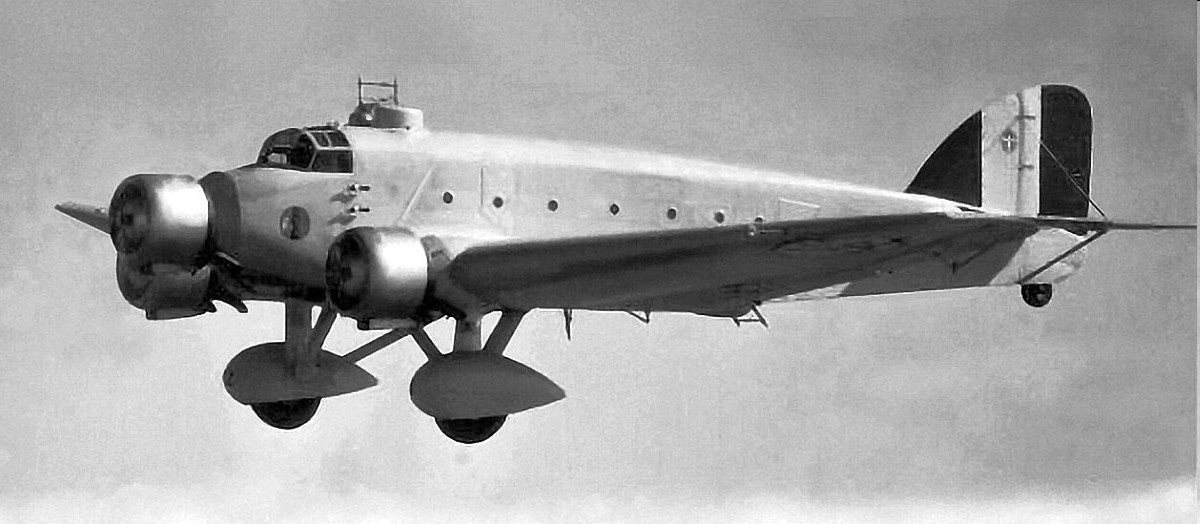
- Savoia Marchetti SM.81 of the Regia Aeronautica during flight

General information
- Type: Bomber and transport aircraft
- National origin: Italy
- Manufacturer: Savoia-Marchetti
- Primary users: Regia Aeronautica Spanish Air Force; Aeronautica Militare
- Number built: 535

History
- Introduction date: 1935
- First flight: 8 February 1934
- Retired: 1950
- Developed from: Savoia-Marchetti S.73

The Savoia-Marchetti SM.81 Pipistrello (Italian: bat) was the first three-engine bomber–transport aircraft serving in the Italian Regia Aeronautica. When it appeared in 1935, it was fast, well armed and had a long range. It proved effective during the Second Italo-Abyssinian War and the Spanish Civil War. Despite being too slow to remain competitive as a bomber in the later years of World War II, it was one of the most flexible, reliable and important aircraft of the Regia Aeronautica from 1935 to 1944, and was adapted to second-line duties in a wide range of tasks.

== Design and development ==
The SM.81 was a militarised version of Savoia-Marchetti's earlier SM.73 airliner, having cantilever wings, three engines, and a fixed undercarriage. The origins of this version were in pursuit of the interests of Italo Balbo, a brilliant exponent of the Fascist regime (but nevertheless "exiled" in Libya by Mussolini), who required a fast and efficient aircraft that was capable of serving the vast Italian colonies in Africa.

The SM.81 had wings that were roughly similar to those of the double-fuselage S.55, and identical to those of the S.73, but had a much simpler fuselage. Around six months after the SM.73s first appearance, the SM.81 prototype (MM.20099) first flew from Vergiate, near Varese, on 8 February 1934, controlled by test pilot Adriano Bacula. The first serie, ordered in 1935, was for 100 aircraft and was quickly put into production as a result of the international crisis and the embargo caused by the war in Ethiopia. The first examples were sent to 7 Wing at Campo della Promessa airbase near Lonate Pozzolo.

Although it was quickly superseded as a front-line bomber, the SM.81 continued to serve as a transport by virtue of its wide fuselage, which allowed it to accommodate a wide range of loads. Apart from its speed, it was generally superior to the SM.79 Sparviero as a multirole aircraft.

=== Overall characteristics ===
The SM.81 was a robust, three-engine monoplane, with a fixed tailwheel undercarriage, with the main wheels enclosed by large spats to reduce drag, and it had a crew of six. The aircraft was of mixed construction: the fuselage had a framework of steel tubes with a metallic-covered aft portion, while the rest was wood- and fabric-covered. It had a relatively large fuselage, an unnecessary characteristic for a bomber, which determined its future as a transport aircraft. Since the engines were quite small, the fuselage did not blend well with the nose engine, even less so than the SM.79. Many windows were present to provide the fuselage interior with daylight, giving the impression that it was a passenger aircraft.

The all-wooden wings had three spars to provide the necessary support, whereas the semi-elliptical tail surfaces were fabric-covered metal. The pilot and co-pilot were seated side-by-side in an enclosed cockpit, with separate cabins for the flight engineer and the radio-operator/gunner behind the cockpit. The bomb bay was behind the cockpit, together with a passage which linked the mid and aft fuselage, where there were three further defensive positions.

The bombardier's position was located just below the cockpit, in a semi-retractable gondola, and differed from that of the SM.79, being both larger and in a location which was more favourable for communicating with the crew, and provided excellent visibility thanks to the glazed panel. Both this position and the cockpit had escape hatches, but for normal entry and exit there was a door in the left, mid-fuselage, and one in the aft fuselage. Equipment included an RA 350I radio-transmitter, AR5 radio-receiver, and a P63N radiocompass (not always fitted), while other systems comprised an electrical generator, fire extinguishing system, and an OMI 30 camera (in the gunner's nacelle).

The aircraft, having a large wing and robust undercarriage, was reliable and pleasant to fly, and could operate from all types of terrain. It was surprisingly fast for its time and, given the power of its engines, especially compared to the similar Junkers Ju 52. It was better armed than the SM.79, but the increased drag combined with the same engine power reduced the maximum speed and cruise speeds as well as the range. No armour was fitted, except for the self-sealing fuel tanks.

=== Armament ===
The SM.81 was equipped with six machine guns, providing a heavy defensive armament for a 1935 aircraft. Two powered retractable turrets, one dorsal (just behind the pilots' seats) and one ventral-aft, were each fitted with 7.7 mm (0.303 in) Breda-SAFAT machine guns, while single 7.7 mm (.303 in) Lewis Guns were mounted to fire through lateral hatches. The turrets were rotated by a "Riva-Calzoni" hydraulic system, while the guns' elevation was manual, and manual backup mechanisms were provided for both the retracting and rotating systems. Once retracted, only the upper part of the turret was visible, with the gun barrels positioned vertically, one aft of the other to reduce drag, giving the impression that the aircraft had additional antennas. Given the SM.81's cruise speed of around 270 km/h (170 mph) and the presence of a massive fixed undercarriage, the aerodynamic gain was relatively small.

The ventral turret was operated in a different fashion than those fitted to other aircraft, where the gunner occupied the ball- or dustbin-shaped structure; instead, due to lack of space, the gunner crouched in the fuselage with his head down inside the turret. This proved not to be very effective, as were most ventral turrets, and they were not fitted to further Savoias, although Piaggio fitted a dustbin-style turret accommodating the gunner to their P.108.

Both flanks were covered by one single and one twin gun installation. Initially six 7.7 mm (.303 in) Vickers machine guns were fitted, but these were later replaced by reliable, if not very fast-firing, models made by Breda, together with 500 rounds per gun.

The SM.81's bomb bay was divided into two parts with a passage linking the aft and mid fuselage between them and could accommodate a wide range of ordnance up to a total of 2,000 kg (4,410 lb) over short ranges, with individual bombs of up to 500 kg (1,100 lb), arranged either horizontally or vertically:

- 4 × 500 kg (1,100 lb) (stored horizontally)
- 4 × 250 kg (550 lb) (ditto)
- 16 × 100 kg (220 lb) (stored vertically, as all the smaller ones), true weight around 130 kg (287 lb)
- 28 × 50 kg (110 lb) (true weight, around 70 kg/150 lb)
- 56 × 31 kg (68 lb), 24 kg (53 lb), 20 kg (40 lb), or 15 kg (33 lb)
- 1,008 × 2 kg (4 lb) (true weight, around 1,700 kg/3,750 lb)
- Incendiary bombs

The bomb-release mechanism was located on the right side of the bombardier's position.

The SM.81's defensive armament was better than its successor, the SM.79, and even than that of the SM.84, although of smaller calibre, but still insufficient when faced with modern enemy fighter opposition. It was also capable of carrying a greater bombload than the SM.79, due to its wide fuselage.

=== Propulsion ===
The SM.81 had a three-engine configuration, but unlike the Sparviero, was fitted with a wide range of engines throughout its production:

- Alfa Romeo 125 RC.35, 432–507 kW (580–680 hp). 192 built.
- Gnome-Rhône 14K, 485–746 kW (650–1,000 hp).96 built.
- Piaggio P.X R.C.15, 501–522 kW (670–700 hp) – 48 built.
- Piaggio P.IX R.C.40, 507 kW (680 hp) – 140 built.
- Alfa Romeo 126 RC.34, 582–671 kW (780–900 hp), also fitted to early versions of the SM.79. 58 built.

In addition, one aircraft, the SM.81B, was built in a twin-engined configuration, powered by two 627 kW (840 hp) Isotta-Fraschini Asso XI inline engines and a streamlined, glazed nose. It had inferior performance to the three-engined versions and was not taken further.

== Fuel ==
The fuel tanks, as was standard for Italian multi-engined aircraft, were metal self-sealing fuel tanks using materials developed by SEMAPE, the specialized manufacturer. Eight tanks were fitted, with six in the centre wing (4 × 150 L/40 US gallon and 2 × 1,140 L/301 US gal tanks) and two 370 L (100 US gal) tanks (or 780 L/210 US gal with Gnome-Rhône 14K engines) in the outer wings. This gave an overall fuel capacity of 3,620 or 4,400 L (960 or 1,160 US gal).

== Operational history ==
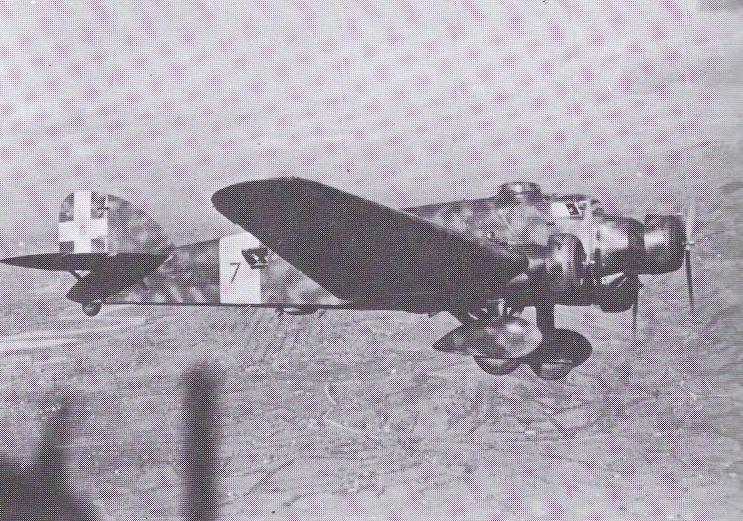
Savoia-Marchetti S.M. 81

The SM.81 first saw combat during the Second Italo-Abyssinian War, where it showed itself to be versatile serving as a bomber, transport and reconnaissance aircraft. SM.81s also fought in the Spanish Civil War with the Aviazione Legionaria and were among the first aircraft sent by the fascist powers to airlift aid to Francisco Franco.

Despite their obsolescence, by 1940, when Italy became involved in World War II, around 300 (290–304 depending on source) SM.81s were in service with the Regia Aeronautica. The first Italian aircraft to enter action in East Africa were a pair of SM.81s. On 11 June 1940, one of them attacked Port Sudan and the other flew a reconnaissance flight over the Red Sea. That same night, three SM.81s took off to bomb Aden, but one turned back, and one of the other two hit a hill near Massawa while trying to land. A further flight was concurrently deployed against Anglo-Rhodesian defensive positions in British Somaliland immediately before the decisive Battle of Tug Argan, presaging a limited role as a tactical bomber.

Its low speed and vulnerability to fighter aircraft meant that during daytime the SM.81 was restricted to second line duties, finding use as a transport. At night it was an effective bomber, particularly in the North African theatre. Anti-ship actions were also carried out, but without significant success.

Most SM.81s were withdrawn by the time of the Italian armistice of 1943, though some remained in service with both the Italian Social Republic and the Italian Co-Belligerent Air Force.

Several examples survived the war and went on to serve with the Aeronautica Militare Italiana, but by 1950 these had all been retired.

SM.81s serving in Ethiopia had markings applied to distinguish them in SAR missions. The normal camouflage pattern was yellow, green and brown. The all-over dark olive green scheme was introduced later, when the aircraft were used only in transport missions.

== Variants ==
SM.81
Three-engine bomber, transport aircraft, 535 built.
SM.81B
Experimental twin-engine prototype, one built.

== Operators ==
Republic of China

- Chinese Nationalist Air Force. Six SM.81Bs were ordered in November 1936, to be built at the Sino-Italian National Aircraft Works (SINAW) at Nanchang, with an additional example purchased direct to Italy. This arrived disassembled at Hong Kong in October 1937, but could not be delivered to China because its packing cases were too large for rail travel. Two of the Nanchang-built aircraft were delivered to the Air Force, with a further example completed but destroyed when the factory was bombed in December 1937. All were lost in training accidents in February 1938 at Yichang.

Kingdom of Italy

- Regia Aeronautica
- Aviazione Legionaria 64 aircraft
- Italian Co-Belligerent Air Force

Italian Social Republic

- Aeronautica Nazionale Repubblicana

Italy

- Aeronautica Militare Italiana operated this type postwar.

Spanish State

- Spanish Air Force

Yugoslavia

- Yugoslav Air Force, a few S.81 were serving in Yugoslav Air Force (1930s-1945), they are also displayed in museum of Aeronautics in Belgrade

== Specifications (SM.81b with Alfa Romeo 125 R.C.35 engines) ==
Data from

General characteristics

- Crew: 6
- Length: 18.3 m (60 ft 0 in)
- Wingspan: 24 m (78 ft 9 in)
- Height: 4.3 m (14 ft 1 in)
- Wing area: 92.2 m^{2} (992 sq ft)
- Empty weight: 6,800 kg (14,991 lb)
- Gross weight: 9,300 kg (20,503 lb)
- Max takeoff weight: 10,505 kg (23,160 lb)
- Powerplant: 3 × Alfa Romeo 125 R.C.35 9-cylinder air-cooled radial piston engine, 485 kW (650 hp) each
- Alternative engines:- Piaggio P.X R.C.15, Alfa Romeo 126 R.C.34 or Gnome-Rhône 14K
- Propellers: 3-bladed propellers

Performance

- Maximum speed: 340 km/h (210 mph, 180 kn) at 4,000 m (13,000 ft)
- Cruise speed: 260 km/h (160 mph, 140 kn)
- Minimum speed: 110 km/h (68 mph; 59 kn)
- Range: 1,500 km (930 mi, 810 nmi)
- Combat range: 430 km (270 mi, 230 nmi) with 2,000 kg (4,409 lb) bomb load
- Ferry range: 2,000 km (1,200 mi, 1,100 nmi)
- Service ceiling: 7,000 m (23,000 ft)
- Time to altitude:

- 1,000 m (3,300 ft) in 4 min 15 s
- 3,000 m (9,800 ft) in 11 min 48 s
- 5,000 m (16,000 ft) in 20 min 36 s

- Wing loading: 101 kg/m^{2} (21 lb/sq ft)

Armament

- Guns: 6 × 7.7 mm (.303 in) Breda-SAFAT machine guns
- Bombs: Up to 2,000 kg (4,409 lb) of bombs

== See also ==
Related development

- SM.79 Sparviero

Aircraft of comparable role, configuration, and era

- Junkers Ju 52
- Bristol Bombay

Related lists

- List of interwar military aircraft
- List of aircraft of World War II
- List of Regia Aeronautica aircraft used in World War II

== Bibliography ==
- Andersson, Lennart (2008). A History of Chinese Aviation: Encyclopedia of Aircraft and Aviation in China until 1949. Taipei, Republic of China: AHS of ROC. ISBN 978-957-28533-3-7.
- Angelucci, Enzo and Paolo Matricardi. World Aircraft: World War II, Volume I (Sampson Low Guides). Maidenhead, UK: Sampson Low, 1978. ISBN 0-562-00096-8.
- Apostolo, Giorgio. The Savoia Marchetti S.M.81 (Aircraft in Profile number 146). Leatherhead, Surrey, UK: Profile Publications Ltd.,1967.
- Lembo, Daniele, SIAI 81 Pipistrello, Aerei nella Storia, n.33.
- Passingham, Malcolm. "Savoia-Marchetti SM81". Aircraft Illustrated, May 1977, Vol 10 No 5. pp. 182–187.
- Mondey, David. The Hamlyn Concise Guide to Axis Aircraft of World War II. Chancellor Press, 2002.
- Playfair, Major-General I. S. O.; et al. (1954). Butler, J. R. M. (ed.). The Mediterranean and Middle East: The Early Successes Against Italy (to May 1941). History of the Second World War, United Kingdom Military Series. Vol. I. London: HMSO. OCLC 494123451.
- Sutherland, Jon & Diane Canwell: Air War East Africa 1940–41 The RAF versus the Italian Air Force. Barnsley (South Yorkshire) Pen and Sword Aviation, 2009. ISBN 978-1-84415-816-4.
