= IMAM Ro.43 =

1934 Italian reconnaissance aircraft

Ro.43
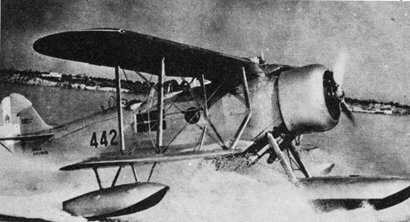
- Ro.43 seaplane

General information
- Type: Reconnaissance
- Manufacturer: IMAM
- Primary user: Regia Marina
- Number built: 193

History
- Introduction date: 1935
- First flight: 19 November 1934

The IMAM Ro.43 was an Italian reconnaissance single-float seaplane, serving in the Regia Marina between 1935 and 1943.

== Design and development ==
The Ro.43 was designed to meet a 1933 requirement by the Regia Marina (the Italian navy) for a catapult-launched reconnaissance aircraft to equip the Maritime Reconnaissance Squadrons operating from its ships. The specification called for a speed of 240 km/h (150 mph), with a range of 600 km (370 mi) or an endurance of 5.5 hours. Other contenders were the Piaggio P.18 and P.20, CMASA MF.10, CANT Z.504 and Macchi C.76.

Derived from the Ro.37 Lince reconnaissance aircraft, by the same designer, the Ro.43 first flew in 1934. The plane was built of steel tubes and wood covered by soft alloy and fabric. It was a two-seat biplane with folding gull upper and inverse gull lower wings, lightly armed and capable of around 300 km/h (190 mph) and over 1,000 km (620 mi) range. This performance more than met the requirements of the specification, and so it was declared the winner. Despite this, the Ro.43 had serious problems. Its lightweight structure meant that it was too delicate for buoyancy at sea and it had poor sea-handling qualities. These problems meant that when it was launched it was quite normal not to recover it at sea, forcing the aircraft to return to land before alighting.

== Operational history ==
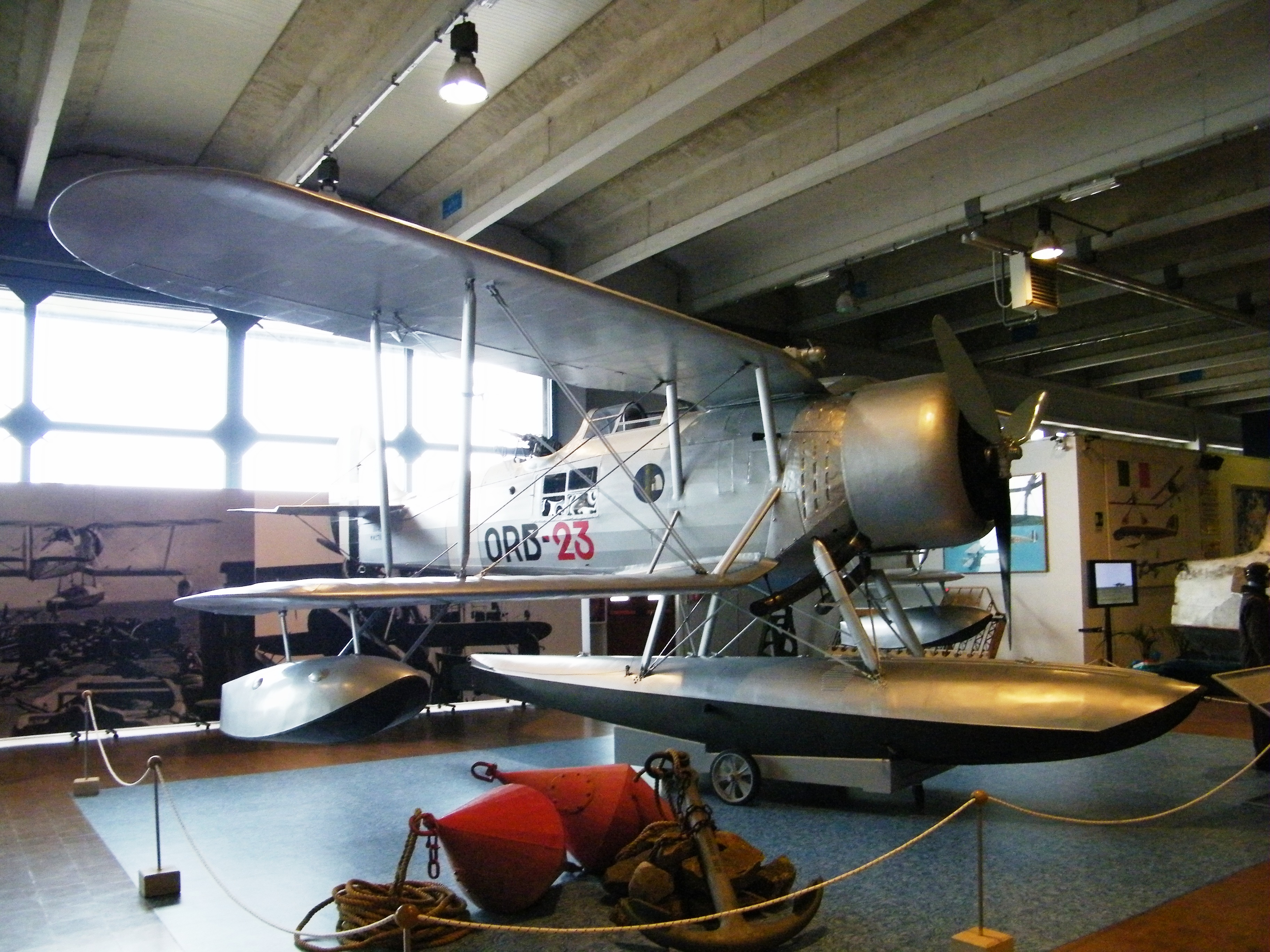
Ro.43 preserved in the Italian Air Force Museum

The aircraft's good endurance meant that seaplanes could still be useful in the constrained Mediterranean. Six Ro.43 launched from light cruisers played a role in spotting the British fleet during the battle of Calabria, in the opening months of the war. One of them, departing from the cruiser Eugenio di Savoia, kept visual contact with the battleship HMS Warspite during the exchange of fire between the British capital ship and the Italian battleship Giulio Cesare before being chased off by a Sea Gladiator from the carrier HMS Eagle.

Near the end of 1940, a lone Ro.43 launched by the heavy cruiser Bolzano was the first to spot the British fleet at the beginning of the battle of Cape Spartivento, at 9:45 while the seaplane of Gorizia located the British convoy at 11:45. British Skuas from the carrier HMS Ark Royal claimed to have shot down one seaplane after a fruitless bombing on the Italian fleet, purportedly an Ro.43 from the battleship Vittorio Veneto. The performance of the Ro.43s in this battle was eulogised by Comando Supremo (Italian supreme command). Another Ro.43 launched by Vittorio Veneto pinpointed the British cruiser squadron at 6:35 during the engagement near Gavdos island, the prelude of the Battle of Cape Matapan, on 28 March 1941.

A cruiser-borne Ro.43 signalled the presence of the British convoy by dropping flares during the Second Battle of Sirte, while another seaplane from the battleship Littorio directed the fire of the Italian fleet onto the British squadron before disengaging at 17:24.

The Ro.43s continued to take part in shipborne operations as late as June 1942, during the Italian cruiser attack on the Operation Harpoon convoy. One of the Italian seaplanes was shot down by a Beaufighter from Malta.

One hundred and five aircraft were in service at the start of World War II, more than enough to equip the major surface units of the Italian Navy, but soon a better aircraft was requested, possibly a navalised fighter. This resulted in a small series being built of a naval version of the Reggiane Re.2000 that could be catapulted but was not fitted with floats so had to either return to a land base or ditch, in a similar fashion to the Hurricanes operated by British CAM ships. The best feature were the folding wings, but even so the maximum carried on board was usually two. This, together with the modest possibilities of recovery and the lack of experience with naval aviation (even though the Italian Navy possessed a seaplane carrier, the Giuseppe Miraglia) limited the use of the aircraft in combat. Approximately 200–240 were produced until 1941, with 48 still in service in 1943. In the late 1940s the Spanish Air Force operated five Ro.43s out of Mallorca. The aircraft had been interned in Spanish territory during the recent war.

== Operators ==
Kingdom of Italy

- Regia Marina
- Regia Aeronautica

Spanish State

- Spanish Air Force

== Specifications (Ro.43) ==
Data from The encyclopaedia of military aircraft, Italian Civil and Military Aircraft 1930–1945

General characteristics

- Crew: 2
- Length: 9.71 m (31 ft 10 in)
- Wingspan: 11.57 m (38 ft 0 in)
- Height: 3.51 m (11 ft 6 in)
- Wing area: 33.36 m^{2} (359.1 sq ft)
- Empty weight: 1,776 kg (3,916 lb)
- Gross weight: 2,400 kg (5,291 lb)
- Powerplant: 1 × Piaggio P.X R. 9-cylinder air-cooled radial piston engine, 522 kW (700 hp)
- Propellers: 3-bladed variable-pitch propeller

Performance

- Maximum speed: 300 km/h (190 mph, 160 kn) at 2,500 m (8,202 ft)
- Cruise speed: 250 km/h (160 mph, 130 kn) * Alighting speed: 103 km/h (64 mph; 56 kn)
- Range: 800–1,500 km (500–930 mi, 430–810 nmi)
- Endurance: 4 hours 30 minutes to 8 hours 30 minutes
- Service ceiling: 6,600 m (21,700 ft)
- Time to altitude: 2,000 m (6,560 ft) in 4 minutes 45 seconds

4,000 m (13,120 ft) in 11 minutes
5,000 m (16,400 ft) in 15 minutes 50 seconds

Armament

- Guns: 2 × 7.7 mm machine guns

== See also ==
Related lists

- List of Interwar military aircraft
- List of aircraft of World War II
